= Pieces of a Dream (Anastacia album) =

Greatest hits album by Anastacia
- Released: November 7, 2005
- Recorded: 1999–2005
- Length: 74:42
- Label: Epic
- Producer: Dallas Austin; Glen Ballard; Jay Baumgardner; Louis Biancaniello; billymann; Claudio Guidetti; David Hodges; Richie Jones; Ben Moody; Eros Ramazzotti; The Shadowmen; John Shanks; Ric Wake; Sam Watters

Anastacia chronology
Anastacia (2004)	Pieces of a Dream (2005)	Heavy Rotation (2008)

Alternative cover
- 2008 reissue cover

Singles from Pieces of a Dream
- 1. "Everything Burns" Released: July 4, 2005; 2. "Pieces of a Dream" Released: November 11, 2005; 3. "I Belong to You (Il Ritmo della Passione)" Released: January 16, 2006

Professional ratings
Review scores
Source	Rating
AllMusic	3.5/5 stars
The Encyclopedia of Popular Music	4/5 stars
MTV Asia	6/10
Rolling Stone	4/5 stars
Yahoo! Music	6/10 stars

Pieces of a Dream is a greatest hits album by American singer Anastacia. It was released on November 7, 2005, by Epic Records. The album includes singles from her first three studio albums, Not That Kind (2000), Freak of Nature (2001), and Anastacia (2004), as well as four new songs (two duets and two solo songs) and a megamix of her greatest hits. Only two of Anastacia's singles—"Boom", the official 2002 FIFA World Cup anthem, and "Love Is a Crime", from the soundtrack to the 2002 film Chicago—were omitted from the album, but are included as remixes on the special edition of the album.

In April 2007, Pieces of a Dream re-entered the UK Albums Chart at number 74. The album was reissued on October 17, 2008, containing the same track listing and new artwork.

== Track listing ==
No.	Title	Writer(s)	Producer(s)	Length
1.	"I'm Outta Love"	Anastacia; Sam Watters; Louis Biancaniello	Biancaniello; Watters	4:02
2.	"Not That Kind"	Anastacia; Will Wheaton; Marvin Young	Ric Wake	3:20
3.	"Cowboys & Kisses"	Anastacia; JIVE; Charlie Pennachio	Wake; The Shadowmen	4:32
4.	"Made for Lovin' You"	Anastacia; Watters; Biancaniello	Biancaniello; Watters	3:35
5.	"Paid My Dues"	Greg Lawson; Damon Sharpe; LaMenga Kafi; Anastacia	Wake; Richie Jones^{[a]}	3:21
6.	"One Day in Your Life"	Anastacia; Watters; Biancaniello	Wake; Biancaniello; Watters; Jones^{[a]}	3:28
7.	"Why'd You Lie to Me"	Anastacia; Sharpe; Lawson; Trey Parker; Damon Butler; Canela Cox	Wake; Jones^{[a]}	3:43
8.	"You'll Never Be Alone"	Anastacia; Watters; Biancaniello	Wake; Watters; Biancaniello; Jones^{[a]}	4:38
9.	"Left Outside Alone"	Anastacia; Glen Ballard; Dallas Austin	Austin; Ballard	4:17
10.	"Sick and Tired"	Anastacia; Austin; Ballard	Ballard; Austin	3:30
11.	"Welcome to My Truth"	Anastacia; Kara DioGuardi; John Shanks	Shanks	4:03
12.	"Heavy on My Heart"	Anastacia; Billy Mann	Ballard; Mann	4:27
13.	"Everything Burns" (Ben Moody featuring Anastacia)	Moody	Moody; Jay Baumgardner	3:43
14.	"I Belong to You (Il Ritmo della Passione)" (with Eros Ramazzotti)	Ramazzotti; Kaballà; Anastacia; DioGuardi; Claudio Guidetti	Ramazzotti; Guidetti	4:28
15.	"Pieces of a Dream"	Anastacia; Ballard; David Hodges	Hodges; Ballard	4:03
16.	"In Your Eyes"	Anastacia; Ballard	Ballard	4:09
17.	"Club Megamix"		Rod Layman	11:48
Total length:				74:42

Limited edition bonus disc
No.	Title	Writer(s)	Length
1.	"I'm Outta Love" (Hex Hector Radio Edit)	Anastacia; Watters; Biancaniello	4:00
2.	"Left Outside Alone" (M*A*S*H Radio Mix)	Anastacia; Austin; Ballard	3:57
3.	"Paid My Dues" (The S-Man's Darkstar Mix)	Lawson; Sharpe; Kafi; Anastacia	5:17
4.	"Sick and Tired" (Jason Nevins Funkrock Remix Edit)	Anastacia; Austin; Ballard	3:24
5.	"Why'd You Lie to Me" (Nu Soul DnB Mix)	Anastacia; Sharpe; Lawson; Parker; Butler; Cox	6:38
6.	"Love Is a Crime" (Thunderpuss Club Mix Edit)	Lawson; Denise Rich; Sharpe; Wake	7:46
7.	"Not That Kind" (Kerri Chandler Mix - Radio Edit)	Anastacia; Wheato; Young	3:45
8.	"One Day in Your Life" (Hex Hector/Mac Quayle Club Mix Edit)	Anastacia; Watters; Biancaniello	8:26
9.	"Left Outside Alone" (Jason Nevins Global Club Edit)	Anastacia; Austin; Ballard	3:44
10.	"Not That Kind" (Ric Wake Club Final Mix Edit)	Anastacia; Wheato; Young	7:05
11.	"Love Is a Crime" (Cotto's Doin' The Crime Mix Edit)	Lawson; Rich; Sharpe; Wake	6:33
12.	"Boom" (Thunderpuss Tribe-A-Pella Mix)	Anastacia; Ballard	6:49
13.	"One Day in Your Life" (Almighty Mix Edit)	Anastacia; Watters; Biancaniello	6:07
14.	"Sick and Tired" (Jason Nevins Electrochill Remix Edit)	Anastacia; Austin; Ballard	3:25
Total length:			76:56

Notes

- ^{^a} signifies an additional producer

== Charts ==
=== Weekly charts ===
Chart (2005–2007)	Peak position
Australian Albums (ARIA)	23
Austrian Albums (Ö3 Austria)	4
Belgian Albums (Ultratop Flanders)	8
Belgian Albums (Ultratop Wallonia)	12
Czech Albums (ČNS IFPI)	22
Danish Albums (Hitlisten)	13
Dutch Albums (Album Top 100)	10
European Albums (Billboard)	6
Finnish Albums (Suomen virallinen lista)	17
French Compilation Albums (SNEP)	2
German Albums (Offizielle Top 100)	7
Greek Albums (IFPI)	5
Hungarian Albums (MAHASZ)	21
Irish Albums (IRMA)	11
Italian Albums (FIMI)	3
New Zealand Albums (RMNZ)	26
Norwegian Albums (VG-lista)	11
Portuguese Albums (AFP)	9
Scottish Albums (OCC)	7
Spanish Albums (Promusicae)	9
Swedish Albums (Sverigetopplistan)	23
Swiss Albums (Schweizer Hitparade)	3
UK Albums (OCC)	6

=== Year-end charts ===
Chart (2005)	Position
Austrian Albums (Ö3 Austria)	71
Belgian Albums (Ultratop Flanders)	73
Dutch Albums (Album Top 100)	66
Swiss Albums (Schweizer Hitparade)	62
UK Albums (OCC)	59

Chart (2006)	Position
Austrian Albums (Ö3 Austria)	43
Dutch Albums (Album Top 100)	87
European Albums (Billboard)	52
German Albums (Offizielle Top 100)	68
Greek Foreign Albums (IFPI)	33
Swiss Albums (Schweizer Hitparade)	44

== Certifications ==
Region	Certification	Certified units/sales
Australia (ARIA)	Gold	35,000^{^}
Austria (IFPI Austria)	Platinum	30,000^{*}
Belgium (BRMA)	Gold	25,000^{*}
Denmark (IFPI Danmark)	Gold	20,000^{^}
Finland (Musiikkituottajat)	Gold	15,000
Germany (BVMI)	Platinum	200,000^{‡}
Greece (IFPI Greece)	Gold	10,000^{^}
Ireland (IRMA)	Platinum	15,000^{^}
Italy (FIMI)	3× Platinum	250,000
Netherlands (NVPI)	Gold	40,000^{^}
New Zealand (RMNZ)	Gold	7,500^{^}
Portugal (AFP)	Gold	10,000^{^}
Russia (NFPF)	Platinum	20,000^{*}
Spain (Promusicae)	Gold	40,000^{^}
Switzerland (IFPI Switzerland)	Platinum	40,000^{^}
United Kingdom (BPI)	Platinum	300,000^{^}
^{*} Sales figures based on certification alone.^{^} Shipments figures based on certification alone.^{‡} Sales+streaming figures based on certification alone.
