= List of awards and nominations received by Anastacia =

Anastacia awards and nominations
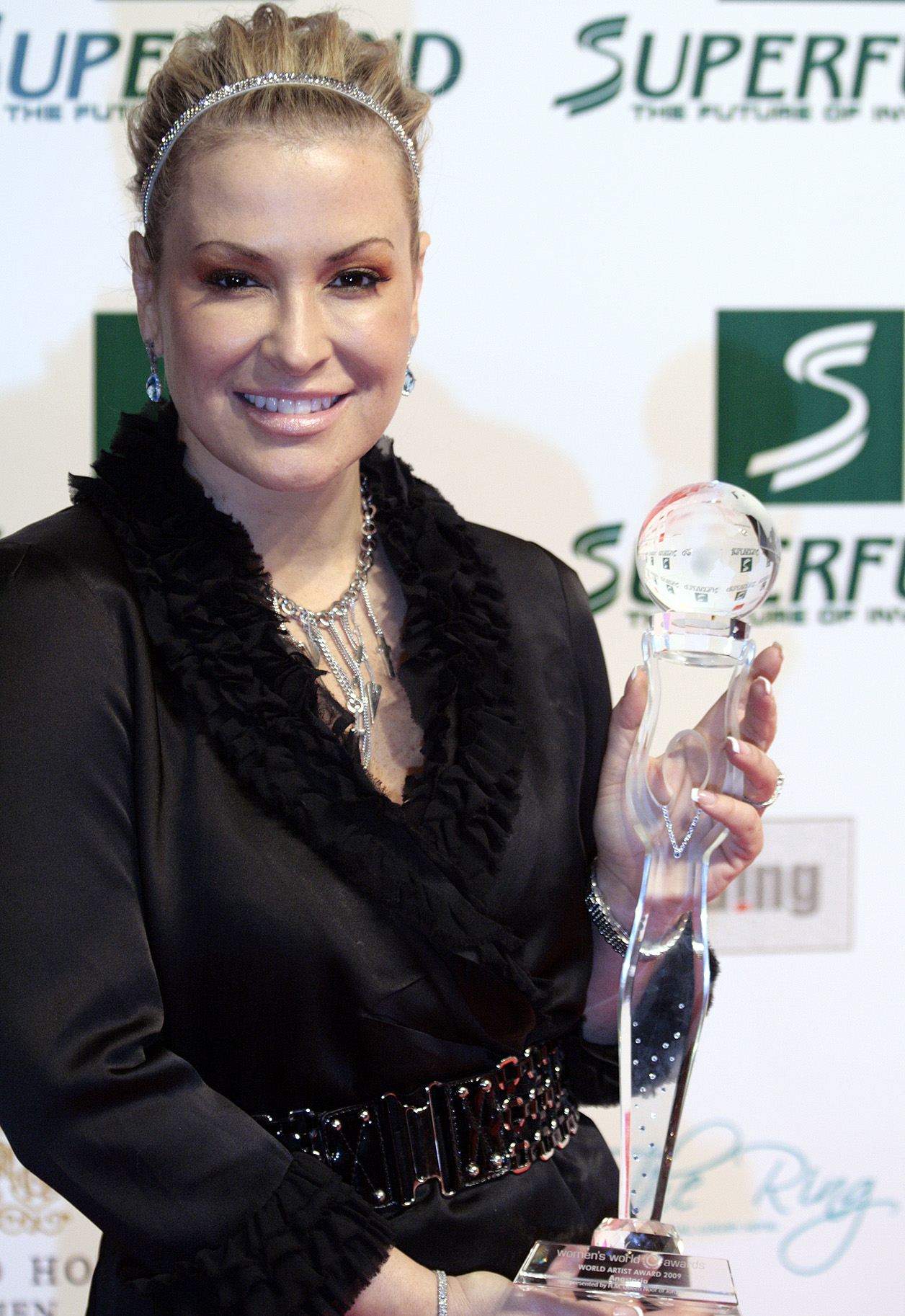
- Anastacia at the Women's World Award 2009
Awards and nominations
Award	Wins	Nominations
Bambi - Deutschlands Wichtigster Medienpreis	1	1
The Brit Awards	0	3
Echo Deutscher Musikpreis	3	4
Edison Music Awards	2	2
Goldene Europa Awards	1	3
Goldene Kamera Awards	1	1
MTV Europe Music Awards	1	6
NRJ Music Awards	2	2
NRJ Radio Awards	0	3
Rockbjörnen	2	2
Swedish Hit Music Awards	1	3
TMF Awards	6	6
VIVA Comet Musikpreis	1	2
Women's World Award	1	1
World Music Awards	3	3

Totals (Note: Certain award groups do not simply award one winner. They acknowledge several different recipients, have runners-up, and have third place. Since this is a specific recognition and is different from losing an award, runner-up mentions are considered wins in this award tally. For simplification and to avoid errors, each award in this list has been presumed to have had a prior nomination.)
- Wins: 42
- Nominations: 57

This is a comprehensive list of awards and nominations received by Anastacia, an American pop singer. She has been active since 1990. She first gained prominence on BET's Comic View, singing Get Here in 1992 age 24. She has won 74% of her nominations. Besides World Music Awards, Anastacia only got nominations for European ceremonies.

Award	Year	Nominee(s)	Category	Result	Ref.
Amadeus Austrian Music Awards	2001	Herself	Best International Artist	Won	
Bambi Awards	2002	Herself	Best International Newcomer	Won	
Brit Awards	2002	Herself	International Breakthrough Act	Nominated	
Brit Awards	2002	Herself	International Female Solo Artist	Nominated	
Brit Awards	2005	Herself	International Female Solo Artist	Nominated	
Danish Music Awards	2001	Herself	Best International Newcomer	Won	
Diva Entertainment Awards	2005	Anastacia	Most Successful Music-CD	Won	
ECHO Awards	2001	Herself	Best International Newcomer	Won	
ECHO Awards	2001	Herself	Best International Female	Nominated	
ECHO Awards	2003	Herself	Best International Female	Nominated	
ECHO Awards	2005	Herself	Best International Female	Won	
Edison Music Awards	2001	Herself	Best International Newcomer	Won	
Edison Music Awards	2002	Herself	Best International Female	Won	
GQ Men of the Year Awards	2013	Herself	Humanitarian Award	Won	
Goldene Europa Awards	2000	Herself	Artist of the Year	Nominated	
Goldene Europa Awards	2000	Herself	Best Newcomer	Won	
Goldene Europa Awards	2002	Herself	Best International Pop Artist	Won	
Hungarian Music Awards	2009	Heavy Rotation	Dance-Pop Album of the Year	Nominated	
Italian Music Awards	2000	Herself	Best International Female Artist	Won	
Italian Music Awards	2001	Herself	Best International Female Artist	Won	
M6 Awards	2000	Herself	International Breakthrough of the Year	Won	
MTV Europe Music Awards	2000	Herself	Best New Act	Nominated	
MTV Europe Music Awards	2001	Herself	Best Pop	Won	
MTV Europe Music Awards	2002	Herself	Best Pop	Nominated	
MTV Europe Music Awards	2004	Herself	Best Pop	Nominated	
MTV Europe Music Awards	2004	Herself	Best Female	Nominated	
MTV Europe Music Awards	2004	"Left Outside Alone"	Best Song	Nominated	
MTV Russia Music Awards	2004	Herself	Best International Act	Nominated	
Maxim Magazine Awards	2004	Herself	Woman of the Year	Won	
Marie Claire	2005	Herself	Woman of the Year	Won	
Muz-TV Music Awards	2011	"Safety" (with Dima Bilan)	Best Duo	Nominated	
NRJ Music Awards	2001	Herself	International Breakthrough of the Year	Won	
NRJ Music Awards	2001	"I'm Outta Love"	International Song of the Year	Won	
NRJ Radio Awards	2005	Herself	Best International Female	Won	
NRJ Radio Awards	2005	Herself	Best International Pop	Won	
NRJ Radio Awards	2005	"Left Outside Alone"	Best International Song	Won	
Noordzee FM Awards	2004	Herself	Best International Female Artist	Won	
Nordic Music Awards	2004	Herself	Best International Female Artist	Won	
Radio Regenbogen Award	2014	Herself	Humanitarian Award	Won	
Rockbjörnen	2005	Herself	Best International Artist	Won	
Rockbjörnen	2005	Anastacia	Best International Album	Won	
SWR3 New Pop Festival	2017	Herself	Pioneer of Pop	Won	
Swedish Hit Music Awards	2002	Herself	Most Played Foreign Artist	Won	
Swedish Hit Music Awards	2002	Herself	Artist of the Year	Nominated	
Swedish Hit Music Awards	2002	"Paid My Dues"	Song of the Year	Nominated	
TMF Awards	2001	Herself	Most Promising Act	Won	
TMF Awards	2001	"I'm Outta Love"	Best Single	Won	
TMF Awards	2002	Herself	Best International Female	Won	
TMF Awards	2004	Herself	Best International Female	Won	
TMF Awards	2004	Herself	Best International Pop	Won	
TMF Awards	2005	Herself	Best International Female	Won	
The Children for Peace	2015	Herself	Humanitarian Award	Won	
The Global Gift Gala	2016	Herself	Humanitarian Award	Won	
VIVA Comet Awards	2002	Herself	Best International Act	Won	
VIVA Comet Awards	2004	Herself	Best International Act	Nominated	
World Music Awards	2000	Herself	World's Best Selling International Artist	Nominated	
World Music Awards	2001	Herself	World's Best Selling New Female Pop Artist	Won	
Women's World Award	2009	Herself	World Artist Award	Won	
Žebřík Music Awards	2000	Herself	Best International Surprise	Nominated	
Žebřík Music Awards	2000	Herself	Best International Female	Nominated	
Žebřík Music Awards	2004	Herself	Best International Female	Won	
Žebřík Music Awards	2004	Herself	Best International Personality	Nominated	
Žebřík Music Awards	2004	Anastacia	Best International Album	Nominated	
Žebřík Music Awards	2005	Anastacia	Best International Album	Nominated	
Žebřík Music Awards	2005	"Left Outside Alone"	Best International Song	Nominated	
Žebřík Music Awards	2005	"Left Outside Alone"	Best International Video	Nominated	
Žebřík Music Awards	2005	Herself	Best International Female	Won	
Žebřík Music Awards	2005	Herself	Best International Surprise	Nominated	
Žebřík Music Awards	2005	Herself	Best International Personality	Nominated	
Žebřík Music Awards	2006	Herself	Best International Female	Nominated	
