= Memories of a Beautiful Disaster =

Studio album by James Durbin
- Released: November 21, 2011
- Recorded: 2011
- Genre: Rock
- Label: Wind-up Records
- Producer: Howard Benson

James Durbin chronology
Memories of a Beautiful Disaster (2011)	Celebrate (2014)

Singles from Memories of a Beautiful Disaster
- 1. "Stand Up" Released: September 22, 2011; 2. "Love Me Bad" Released: October 19, 2011

Memories of a Beautiful Disaster is the debut studio album of American rock musician James Durbin, released on November 21, 2011 through Wind-up Records.

== Recording ==
The name of the album was announced in late September 2011 by Durbin via a Twitter post, and the cover was revealed on October 7. The album was released on November 21, 2011 on Wind-up Records. Howard Benson was the producer.

Guitarist Mick Mars is a guest on one song from the album. Other musicians involved with the album include songwriter Marti Frederiksen, Swedish band Hardcore Superstar and Sixx:A.M. members James Michael, and DJ Ashba.

== Singles ==
Two singles were initially released from the album. "Love Me Bad" was leaked online on October 19, 2011, but was officially released on Ryan Seacrest's radio show on November 2. The second single, "Stand Up", was originally written for Official Gameday Music of the NFL Vol. 1 and was released to rock radio stations.

== Track listing ==
The track listing for the album was revealed on October 19, 2011.

No.	Title	Writer(s)	Length
1.	"Higher Than Heaven"	James Durbin; James Michael; Marti Frederiksen	2:56
2.	"All I Want"	Jasen Rauch; Zach Webb	3:19
3.	"Love in Ruins"	Anna Waronker; Charlotte Caffey; Steven McDonald	4:01
4.	"Right Behind You"	Durbin	3:37
5.	"Love Me Bad"	Frederiksen; Mark Holman	3:26
6.	"Deeper"	Aidean Abounasseri; Grady Benson; Joe Gunther	3:51
7.	"May"	Doug Brown	5:02
8.	"Screaming"	Durbin; David Cook; Bobby Alt; Gregg Wattenberg; Ryan Star	3:25
9.	"Outcast" (featuring Mick Mars)	Durbin; Mars; Magnus Andreasson; Martin Sandvik	3:37
10.	"Everything Burns"	Ben Moody	3:38
11.	"Stand Up"	Cliff Newton; Paul Trust	3:00
12.	"Liberate" (Bonus Track For iTunes & Japan)	Blair Daly; Derek Fuhrmann	2:45
13.	"Back For More" (Bonus Track For iTunes & Japan)	Peter Stengaard	4:33
14.	"Crawling Home" (Bonus Track For Japan)	Durbin; DJ Ashba	4:27

== Reception ==
Professional ratings
Review scores
Source	Rating
Allmusic	3/5 stars

Allmusic gave Memories of a Beautiful Disaster a rating of three out of five stars, and said that while the album was "much more pop than rock," in contrast to Durbin's American Idol performances, it "does deliver the vocal goods here on material that should appeal to his AmIdol fan base."

== Chart performance ==
The album debuted on the Billboard 200 chart at number 36 with first-week sales of 28,000. The album has sold 123,000 copies in the US as of January 2017.

=== Weekly charts ===
Chart (2011)	Peak position
US Billboard 200	36
US Top Rock Albums (Billboard)	8

=== Year-end charts ===
Chart (2012)	Position
US Top Rock Albums (Billboard)	69
