= Sugar Money =

Sugar Money may refer to:

- Sugar Money (band), a band by Bo Bice, American Idol runner-up
- Sugar Money (novel), a 2017 novel by Jane Harris
