= Sugar Money (band) =

SugarMoney is a band by Bo Bice, the runner up on the fourth season of American Idol. Members include: John "Coop" Cooper on bass, Shane Sexton on drums, Kris Bell on guitar, Heath Clark on guitar and Thomas Lee on keyboards.

Bo, John and Shane played together for several years prior to Bo auditioning for American Idol and were in several bands together before settling into SugarMoney (including Purge and Blue Suede Nickel). Their CD, Recipe for Flavor, was recorded in 2000.

In April 2005, Kris relocated to Nashville and met Shane and John while auditioning for a country cover band. The chemistry was instant and within a couple of weeks, Kris met Bo and was asked to join the band. In the words of John Cooper, "One word will sum this up......destiny." Kris first appeared with the band in October 2005 at BayFest in Mobile, Alabama.

Thomas Lee's connection to the band began when Kris joined. Both were natives of the San Diego music scene and that summer, Thomas also relocated to Nashville and joined SugarMoney. Thomas first appeared on stage with SugarMoney at BayFest (Mobile, AL), shortly after joining the band.

Over the next few months, the band continued to play live shows (including a benefit for victims of Hurricane Katrina and an appearance at Cleveland's House of Blues) and TV gigs promoting Bo's debut CD, The Real Thing, including LIVE! With Regis and Kelly and Jimmy Kimmel Live!.

In early 2006, Heath Clark was one of eight guitarists to audition for the band and several members have said the connection was instant, he was meant to be a part of SugarMoney. Heath first appeared with the band in March 2006 during their second performance on LIVE! With Regis and Kelly, just days after joining the band.

SugarMoney appears on three tracks on The Real Thing Dual Disc version: Cinnamon & Novocaine, Sinner In A Sin, Whiskey, Women & Time.

== Band members ==
- John "Coop" Cooper - bass, backing vocals
- Shane Sexton - drums
- Kris Bell - guitar, backing vocals
- Thomas Lee - keyboards, guitar, backing vocals
- Heath Clark - guitar, backing vocals
