= The Halo Method =

American rock band

- Origin: Hollywood, California, United States
- Years active: 2012–present
- Members: Ben Moody; Miles McPherson; Lukas Rossi; Josh Newell
- Past members: Dave Buckner

The Halo Method is an American rock band formed in 2012 in Hollywood, California. It consists of guitarist Ben Moody, drummer Miles McPherson, vocalist Lukas Rossi, and bassist Josh Newell (ex-In This Moment).

Their debut four-track Reset EP was released on May 28, 2013, through ESP Guitars' website.

The band's debut LP remained unreleased until January 12, 2025, when Rossi released the full album on his YouTube channel.

== History ==
Longtime friends Moody and Buckner found themselves together at Ben Moodyʼs Hollywood home/studio in Summer 2012. Moody states, "We didnʼt set out to do anything serious. We were really just going to get together and play some covers for fun, but it was evident very quick that there was something special going on. After a few songs, it was obvious that we had something different than weʼve ever done before.”

On September 19, 2012, the first interview with the band was published on Revolver Magazine website. The page also featured the band's debut song, "Beauty Is The Beast".

On November 27 through December 1, 2012, the band debuted live on ShipRocked 2012 alongside such bands as Godsmack, Korn, Five Finger Death Punch, P.O.D., Sevendust, Filter, 10 Years, Fuel, Pop Evil, In This Moment and others. Newell joined the band as bassist before the show and it became permanent.

On May 28, 2013, The Halo Method released their debut EP Reset which features four songs: "Toxic", "Beauty Is The Beast", "Porcelain" and "Crutch". It was made available for free download on ESP Guitars website.

On June 3, 2013, Revolver Magazine website released the band's first video for "Toxic".

On January 10, 2014, Dave Buckner stepped down from his position as drummer of the band citing location and logistics as his reasons for doing so. Miles McPherson (member of Look What I Did) was recruited to take his place.

== Members ==
- Lukas Rossi – vocals (2012–present)
- Ben Moody – guitars (2012–present)
- Josh Newell – bass (2012–present)
- Miles McPherson – drums (2014–present)

== Former members ==
- Dave Buckner – drums (2012–2014)
