= Calma apparente =

Calma apparente/Calma aparente

Studio album by Eros Ramazzotti
- Released: 28 October 2005
- Recorded: 2004–2005
- Genre: Pop rock, soft rock, Latin
- Length: 54:50
- Label: Sony BMG Norte

Eros Ramazzotti chronology
9 (2003)	Calma apparente/Calma aparente (2005)	e² (2007)

Singles from Calma apparente
- 1. "La nostra vita" Released: 16 September 2005; 2. "I Belong to You (Il ritmo della passione)" Released: 9 December 2005; 3. "Bambino nel tempo" Released: 12 May 2006; 4. "Sta passando novembre" Released: 6 October 2006

Calma apparente ("Apparently Calm" or "Assumedly Calm", in English), also known by its Spanish name Calma aparente, is a 2005 studio album by Italian singer-songwriter Eros Ramazzotti. The album was preceded by the single "La nostra vita", released on 16 September 2005 and sold 43,000 copies in Italy.

== Track listing ==
=== Calma apparente ===
No.	Title	Writer(s)	Length
1.	"La nostra vita"	Claudio Guidetti, Eros Ramazzotti	4:37
2.	"L'equilibrista"	Kaballà, Ramazzotti, Guidetti	3:53
3.	"Bambino nel tempo"	Kaballà, Ramazzotti, Guidetti	4:41
4.	"Tu sei"	Kaballà, Ramazzotti, Guidetti	4:00
5.	"Solarità"	Ramazzotti, Guidetti, Adelio Cogliati	3:54
6.	"Sta passando novembre"	Maurizio Fabrizio, Guidetti, Ramazzotti, Cogliati	4:11
7.	"Una nuova età"	Ramazzotti, Guidetti, Cogliati	3:48
8.	"Nomadi d'amore"	Ramazzotti, Guidetti, Cogliati	4:01
9.	"Non è amore"	Ramazzotti, Guidetti, Kaballà	4:01
10.	"L'ultimo metrò"	Ramazzotti, Guidetti, Kaballà	4:32
11.	"I Belong to You (Il ritmo della passione)" (duet with Anastacia)	Anastacia, Kara DioGuardi, Giuseppe Rinaldi, Ramazzotti	4:26
12.	"Beata solitudine"	Ramazzotti, Guidetti, Cogliati	4:08
13.	"Calma apparente"	Ramazzotti, Guidetti, Kaballà	4:37

Tour Edition videos
No.	Title	Writer(s)	Length
14.	"L'ombra del gigante" (Live)	Lorenzo Cherubini, Cogliati, Guidetti, Ramazzotti	6:15
15.	"Medley: Terra promessa, Una storia importante, Adesso tu" (Live)	Ramazzotti, Brioschi, Alberto Salerno / Ramazzotti, Piero Cassano, Cogliati / Ramazzotti, Cassano, Cogliati	7:25

=== Calma aparente ===
No.	Title	Writer(s)	Length
1.	"Nuestra vida"	Guidetti, Ramazzotti, Ortíz	4:37
2.	"El equilibrista"	Kaballà, Ramazzotti, Guidetti, Ortíz	3:53
3.	"Como un niño"	Kaballà, Ramazzotti, Guidetti, Ortíz	4:41
4.	"Tú eres"	Kaballà, Ramazzotti, Guidetti, Ortíz	4:00
5.	"Solaridad"	Ramazzotti, Guidetti, Cogliati, Ortíz	3:54
6.	"Está pasando noviembre"	Fabrizio, Guidetti, Ramazzotti, Cogliati, Ortíz	4:11
7.	"Una nueva edad"	Ramazzotti, Guidetti, Cogliati, Ortíz	3:48
8.	"Nomadas de amor"	Ramazzotti, Guidetti, Cogliati, Ortíz	4:01
9.	"No es amor"	Ramazzotti, Guidetti, Kaballà, Ortíz	4:01
10.	"El último metro"	Ramazzotti, Guidetti, Kaballà, Ortíz	4:32
11.	"I Belong to You (El Ritmo de la Pasión)" (duet with Anastacia)	Anastacia, DioGuardi, Ramazzotti, Rinaldi	4:26
12.	"Vivo sin ti"	Ramazzotti, Guidetti, Cogliati, Ortíz	4:08
13.	"Calma aparente"	Ramazzotti, Guidetti, Kaballà, Ortíz	4:37

== Charts ==
=== Weekly charts ===
Chart (2005)	Peak position
Austrian Albums (Ö3 Austria)	2
Belgian Albums (Ultratop Flanders)	12
Belgian Albums (Ultratop Wallonia)	3
Danish Albums (Hitlisten)	12
Dutch Albums (Album Top 100)	4
European Albums Chart	4
Finnish Albums (Suomen virallinen lista)	15
French Albums (SNEP)	5
German Albums (Offizielle Top 100)	4
Greek Albums (IFPI)	1
Hungarian Albums (MAHASZ)	5
Italian Albums (FIMI)	1
Polish Albums (ZPAV)	45
Portuguese Albums (AFP)	22
Spanish Albums (PROMUSICAE)	4
Swedish Albums (Sverigetopplistan)	20
Swiss Albums (Schweizer Hitparade)	1

=== Year-end charts ===
Chart (2005)	Position
Austrian Albums (Ö3 Austria)	55
Belgian Albums (Ultratop Wallonia)	26
Dutch Albums (Album Top 100)	49
French Albums (SNEP)	94
Swiss Albums (Schweizer Hitparade)	7

Chart (2006)	Position
Austrian Albums (Ö3 Austria)	19
Belgian Albums (Ultratop Flanders)	92
Belgian Albums (Ultratop Wallonia)	67
Dutch Albums (Album Top 100)	76
German Albums (Offizielle Top 100)	30
Swiss Albums (Schweizer Hitparade)	11

== Certifications ==
Region	Certification	Certified units/sales
Austria (IFPI Austria)	Platinum	30,000^{*}
Belgium (BRMA)	Gold	25,000^{*}
France (SNEP)	Gold	100,000^{*}
Germany (BVMI)	Platinum	200,000^{^}
Greece (IFPI Greece)	Gold	10,000^{^}
Hungary (MAHASZ)	Gold	5,000^{^}
Italy (FIMI)	3× Diamond	1,200,000^{*}
Netherlands (NVPI)	Gold	40,000^{^}
Spain (PROMUSICAE)	Gold	50,000^{^}
Switzerland (IFPI Switzerland)	2× Platinum	80,000^{^}
Summaries
Europe (IFPI)	Platinum	1,500,000
^{*} Sales figures based on certification alone.^{^} Shipments figures based on certification alone.
