= I Belong to You (Il Ritmo della Passione) =

2006 single by Eros Ramazzotti and Anastacia

Single by Eros Ramazzotti and Anastacia

from the album Calma apparente and Pieces of a Dream
- Released: 20 January 2006
- Recorded: Medastudios (Milan, Italy)
- Length: 4:27 (Italian and Spanish version)
- Label: Epic; Daylight; Ariola; Radiorama; Sony BMG
- Songwriters: Eros Ramazzotti; Kaballà; Anastacia; Kara DioGuardi; Claudio Guidetti
- Producers: Eros Ramazzotti; Claudio Guidetti

Eros Ramazzotti singles chronology
"La nostra vita" (2006)	"I Belong to You (Il Ritmo della Passione)" (2006)	"Bambino nel tempo" (2006)

Anastacia singles chronology
"Pieces of a Dream" (2005)	"I Belong to You (Il Ritmo della Passione)" (2006)	"I Can Feel You" (2008)

Music video
- "I Belong to You (Il Ritmo della Passione)" on YouTube

"I Belong to You (Il Ritmo della Passione)" (English: "I Belong to You (The Rhythm of Passion)") is a duet by Italian singer Eros Ramazzotti and American singer Anastacia, released as the second single from Ramazzotti's eleventh studio album, Calma apparente (2005), and the third from Anastacia's first greatest hits album, Pieces of a Dream (2005). It was met with commercial success in mainland Europe, particularly Germany, peaking at number one and becoming the ninth-biggest-selling song of 2006. It also topped the singles charts in Italy and Switzerland and peaked within the top five in several other countries.

The song is a ballad in which Anastacia sings in English and Ramazzotti in Italian or Spanish. As Ramazzotti records his songs in both Italian and Spanish, there are two versions of this song as well: the original one with Italian lyrics and the other with Spanish lyrics, entitled "I Belong to You (El ritmo de la pasión)", which is available on the Spanish versions of both Ramazzotti's and Anastacia's albums.

== Critical reception ==
While reviewing Anastacia's Pieces of a Dream compilation, Lisa Haines of BBC Music referred to the song as "a gorgeous duet with Eros Ramazzotti which reveals a silkier side to the hard edge normally so distinctive in her voice, and ends with the kind of lung excess that would put Celine Dion to shame."

== Music video ==
The music video was directed by Don Allan and was filmed in Rome, Italy, on 21–22 November 2005. In the video, Ramazzotti and Anastacia play a romantic couple.

== Track listings ==
European CD single

1. "I Belong to You (Il Ritmo della Passione)"
2. "I Belong to You (El Ritmo de la Pasión)"

European maxi-CD single

1. "I Belong to You (Il Ritmo della Passione)"
2. "I Belong to You (El Ritmo de la Pasión)"
3. "I Belong to You (Il Ritmo della Passione)" (video)
4. "I Belong to You (El Ritmo de la Pasión)" (video)

== Charts ==
=== Weekly charts ===
Chart (2006)	Peak position
Austria (Ö3 Austria Top 40)	2
Belgium (Ultratop 50 Flanders)	2
Belgium (Ultratop 50 Wallonia)	5
CIS Airplay (TopHit)	132
Europe (Eurochart Hot 100)	3
Germany (GfK)	1
Hungary (Rádiós Top 40)	1
Hungary (Single Top 40)	5
Italy (FIMI)	1
Netherlands (Dutch Top 40)	7
Netherlands (Single Top 100)	6
Switzerland (Schweizer Hitparade)	1

Chart (2008)	Peak position
Portugal Digital Song Sales (Billboard)	5

=== Year-end charts ===
Chart (2006)	Rank
Austria (Ö3 Austria Top 40)	6
Belgium (Ultratop 50 Flanders)	9
Belgium (Ultratop 50 Wallonia)	16
Europe (Eurochart Hot 100)	17
Germany (Media Control GfK)	9
Hungary (Rádiós Top 40)	39
Netherlands (Dutch Top 40)	27
Netherlands (Single Top 100)	26
Switzerland (Schweizer Hitparade)	5

== Certifications ==
Region	Certification	Certified units/sales
Austria (IFPI Austria)	Gold	15,000^{*}
Belgium (BRMA)	Gold	25,000^{*}
Germany (BVMI)	Gold	150,000^{^}
Italy (FIMI) sales since 2009	Gold	50,000^{‡}
Switzerland (IFPI Switzerland)	Gold	15,000^{^}
^{*} Sales figures based on certification alone.^{^} Shipments figures based on certification alone.^{‡} Sales+streaming figures based on certification alone.

== Release history ==
Region	Date	Format(s)	Label(s)	Ref.
Europe	20 January 2006	CD	Epic; Daylight; Ariola; Radiorama; Sony BMG	
Europe	27 January 2006	Maxi-CD	Epic; Daylight; Ariola; Radiorama; Sony BMG	
