= Pieces of a Dream (Anastacia song) =

2005 single by Anastacia

Single by Anastacia

from the album Pieces of a Dream
- B-side: "Club Megamix"
- Released: November 11, 2005
- Recorded: 2005
- Studio: Ocean Way (Los Angeles)
- Length: 4:03
- Label: Epic; Daylight
- Songwriter(s): Anastacia; Glen Ballard; David Hodges
- Producer(s): David Hodges; Glen Ballard

Anastacia singles chronology
"Everything Burns" (2005)	"Pieces of a Dream" (2005)	"I Belong to You (Il Ritmo della Passione)" (2006)

Audio
- "Pieces of a Dream" on YouTube

"Pieces of a Dream" is a song by American singer Anastacia from her first greatest hits album, Pieces of a Dream (2005). Written by Anastacia, Glen Ballard, and David Hodges, the track was produced by the latter two and details a number of difficult issues Anastacia experienced while touring in 2005 such as the breakdown of her relationship and the death of her estranged father. The single was released as the album's lead single in Europe on November 11, 2005, and in the United Kingdom 10 days later. The single reached the 10 ten in Italy and the Netherlands and the top 20 in Germany and Switzerland. It also peaked at number one in Spain three years after its original release.

== Critical reception ==
AllMusic editor Sharon Mawer said that this song is "more midtempo but it suffers from a lack of a discernible melody."

== Music video ==
The music video for "Pieces of a Dream" was directed by David Lippman and Charles Mehling, and was filmed in Los Angeles, California, between September 17–18, 2005. Shot entirely in black-and-white, the video is mostly set in dark woods, and has no coherent storyline, featuring a series of mysterious images—perhaps to literally interpret the song's title.

The video depicts Anastacia's descent into madness, and the hallucinations she has, such as a frozen rose and images of herself burning. It is later revealed that Anastacia is being held in a padded cell, and that the video is actually a part of her dream.

== Track listing ==
UK and European CD single

1. "Pieces of a Dream"
2. "Club Megamix"

== Credits and personnel ==
Credits are lifted from the UK CD single liner notes.

Studio

- Recorded at Ocean Way Studios (Los Angeles)

Personnel

- Anastacia – writing, executive production
- Glen Ballard – writing, production
- David Hodges – writing, piano, keyboards, production
- Joel Shearer – guitars
- Sean Hurley – bass
- Mark Colbert – drums
- Bill Malena – recording
- Scott Campbell – additional recording
- Tom Lord-Alge – mixing
- Jeff Burns – assistant engineering

== Charts ==
=== Weekly charts ===
Chart (2005)	Peak position
Austria (Ö3 Austria Top 40)	29
Belgium (Ultratip Bubbling Under Flanders)	1
Belgium (Ultratip Bubbling Under Wallonia)	4
CIS Airplay (TopHit)	133
European Hot 100 Singles (Billboard)	30
Germany (GfK)	20
Greece (IFPI)	13
Ireland (IRMA)	26
Italy (FIMI)	3
Netherlands (Dutch Top 40)	8
Netherlands (Single Top 100)	38
Scotland (OCC)	27
Switzerland (Schweizer Hitparade)	18
UK Singles (OCC)	48

Chart (2008)	Peak position
Spain (PROMUSICAE)	1

=== Year-end charts ===
Chart (2005)	Position
Netherlands (Dutch Top 40)	68

== Release history ==
Region	Date	Format(s)	Label(s)	Ref.
Europe	November 11, 2005	CD	Epic; Daylight	
United Kingdom	November 21, 2005	CD	Epic; Daylight	
