= See the Light (Bo Bice album) =

Studio album by Bo Bice
- Released: October 23, 2007
- Recorded: 2007
- Studios: Wrucke's House Studio (Nashville, Tennessee)
- Genres: Rock; southern rock; country rock
- Length: 42:00
- Label: Sugarmoney/StratArt
- Producers: Bo Bice; Frank Liddell; Mike Wrucke

Bo Bice chronology
The Real Thing (2005)	See the Light (2007)	3 (2010)

Professional ratings
Review scores
Source	Rating
Allmusic	3/5 stars
Entertainment Weekly	C
Los Angeles Times	3/4 stars

See the Light is the second album by American singer Bo Bice, released on October 23, 2007, by Sugarmoney/StratArt.

== Background ==
Bice's debut album, The Real Thing, was with RCA. After parting ways with RCA, according to BoBice.com, he signed with the indie label $ugarmoney/StratArt, a partnership between Bo and the label of Strategic Artist Management, his management company. The album was released as a Wal-Mart exclusive.

Bice stated about the sound of "See the Light" that:

On the next album I’d like to go more rootsy, more country, more southern rock Bo.

"It's a star-studded cast, and I'm the only one on there who's not famous," the ever-humble Bice joked. "I picked and co-wrote the songs that if I was a guy who would be spending my hard-earned money buying an album I would want to hear." That means original back-to-basics Southern rock and country-tinged singer/songwriter tunes co-written with A.J. Croce (son of 1970s singer Jim Croce) and Chris Tompkins (Carrie Underwood's "Before He Cheats").

Bice also stated that he wrote thirty-one songs for the album and narrowed it down between ten and twelve songs. The songs featured session performances by classic and southern rock luminaries keyboardist Chuck Leavell, The Black Crowes’s drummer Steve Gorman, and guitarist Waddy Wachtel (who has worked with just about everyone, including The Rolling Stones, Bryan Ferry, Stevie Nicks and Bob Seger).

== Track listing ==
All songs written by Bo Bice, except where noted.

No.	Title	Writer(s)	Length
1.	"Witness"		3:41
2.	"Take the Country Outta Me"		3:21
3.	"I'm Gone"	Bice; Chris Tompkins	4:30
4.	"Only Words"	Bice, Dan Hardin	4:06
5.	"Got Money"		3:56
6.	"See the Light"	Bice; Thomas Lee	4:19
7.	"Sinner in a Sin"		4:41
8.	"This Train"	Bice; Lee	4:12
9.	"Ain't Gonna Die"	Bice, Gary Nichols	3:07
10.	"Whiskey, Women & Time"		6:06

== Personnel ==
Performance credits

- Bo Bice – vocals, guitars, 12 string guitar, dobro, mandolin, harmonica, backing vocals (2, 3, 5, 10)
- Thomas Lee – keyboards, guitars
- Phillip Shouse – guitars, backing vocals (1)
- Dan Dugmore – lap steel guitar, mandolin
- Glenn Worf – bass
- Steve Gorman – drums
- Miles McPherson – percussion
- Ike Bartley – saxophone
- Patrick Mitchell – backing vocals (1, 3, 7, 8)
- Raquel Wynn – backing vocals (1, 3, 4, 7)
- Carol Chase – backing vocals (3, 8)
- Vicki Hampton – backing vocals (6)
- Shandra Penix – backing vocals (6)

Production and Technical credits

- Bo Bice – producer
- Frank Liddell – producer
- Mike Wrucke – producer, engineer, mixing
- John Beard – engineer
- Eric Tonkin – assistant engineer
- Louie Teran – mastering at Marcussen Mastering (Hollywood, California)
- Jason Harler – art direction
- David McClister – photography
- Nicole Schneider – styling
- Ramie Roth – grooming
- Strategic Artist Management – management
- Mary Ann McCready – business management
- Julie Boos – business management
- Joey Lee – agency

== Chart performance ==
See the Light's chart performance reached a number of 150 in the US. As of October 14, 2008 it had sold 61,000+ copies.

== Release history ==
List of release dates, showing region, label, format and edition(s)
Region	Date	Format(s)	Label	Edition(s)
Australia	October 23, 2007	CD, digital download	Sugarmoney/Strat	Standard
Canada	October 23, 2007	CD, digital download	Sugarmoney/Strat	Standard
Germany	October 23, 2007	CD, digital download	Sugarmoney/Strat	Standard
United Kingdom	October 23, 2007	CD, digital download	Sugarmoney/Strat	Standard
United States	October 23, 2007	CD, digital download	Sugarmoney/Strat	Standard
