= Celebrate (James Durbin album) =

Studio album by James Durbin
- Released: April 8, 2014
- Recorded: 2013–14
- Genre: Pop rock
- Length: 39:28 (Standard); 46:25 (Deluxe)
- Label: Wind-Up
- Producer: Mark Droescher, Scott "The Ninja" Stevens

James Durbin chronology
Memories of a Beautiful Disaster (2011)	Celebrate (2014)	Riot on Sunset (2016)

Singles from Celebrate
- 1. "Parachute" Released: November 22, 2013

Celebrate is the second album from American singer James Durbin. The album was released on April 8, 2014. The first single from the album, "Parachute", was released on November 22, 2013.

== Critical reception ==
Glenn Gamboa of Newsday gave the album a B grade, saying "James Durbin made a name on American Idol as a hard rocker with a big voice, but on his sophomore album [...] he tries out all sorts of musical styles. His current single, "Parachute," is a straight-up pop-rock winner, following in the footsteps of Daughtry, as he sings the catchy hook "Jump! Jump! Jump! Without my parachute" to approximate falling in love. The ballad "Issues" could have come from the latest One Direction album, a more metallic-tinged "Story of My Life." That doesn't mean Durbin has given up rocking out, though, as the rumbling "Louder Than a Loaded Gun" shows."

== Track listing ==
Standard edition
No.	Title	Length
1.	"Children Under the Sun"	3:57
2.	"Parachute"	3:25
3.	"You Can't Believe"	3:39
4.	"Issues"	4:01
5.	"Fool For You"	3:26
6.	"Louder Than a Loaded Gun"	3:41
7.	"Live Right Now"	3:24
8.	"You're Not Alone"	3:53
9.	"Forget It"	3:21
10.	"Celebrate"	3:40
11.	"Real Love"	3:01
Total length:		39:28

Deluxe edition
No.	Title	Length
12.	"Get Over Yourself"	3:18
13.	"My Only Regret"	3:39
Total length:		46:25

== Chart performance ==
The album debuted on the Billboard 200 at No. 83. It also debuted in three other Billboard charts: No. 14 on Top Rock Albums, No. 21 on Top Internet Albums, and No. 78 on Top Current Albums. It sold 4,000 copies in its debut week.

Chart	Peak position
US Billboard 200	83
US Top Rock Albums (Billboard)	14
