= Ben Moody =

American guitarist (born 1981)

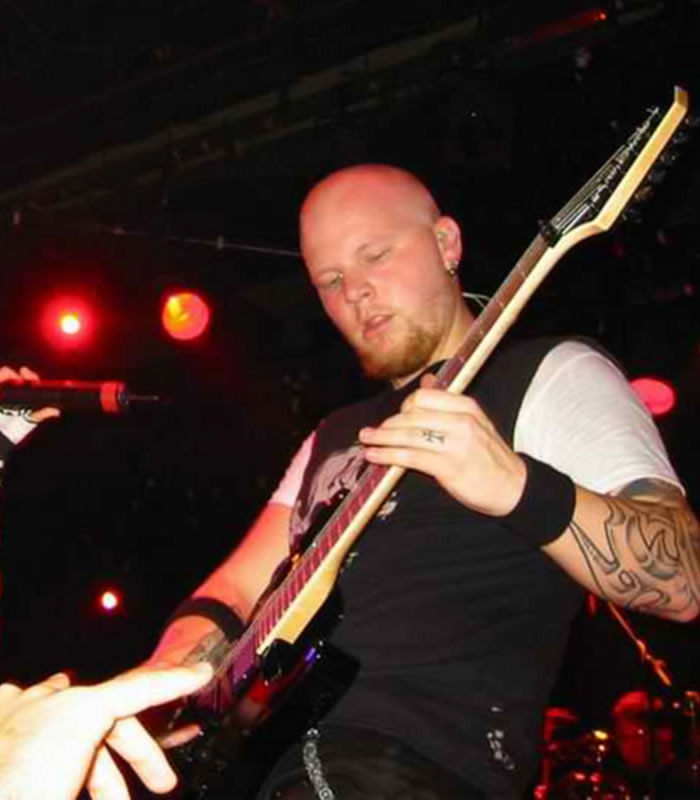
- Moody performing in 2003

Background information
- Born: January 22, 1981 (age 45); Little Rock, Arkansas, U.S.
- Genres: Nu metal; hard rock
- Occupations: Guitarist; songwriter; record producer
- Instrument: Guitar
- Years active: 1994–present
- Labels: FNR; Wind-up; Universal Motown Republic
- Member of: The Halo Method
- Formerly of: Evanescence; We Are the Fallen
- Website: www.benmoody.com

Benjamin Moody (born January 22, 1981) is an American guitarist, songwriter and record producer. He co-founded rock band Evanescence, which he departed in 2003 after the release of their debut album Fallen (2003). After leaving Evanescence, Moody co-wrote and co-produced songs for Kelly Clarkson, Avril Lavigne, Anastacia, Lindsay Lohan, Bo Bice, Daughtry, and Celine Dion.

== Early life ==
Moody was born on January 22, 1981 in Little Rock, Arkansas. He described his youth in Little Rock as being lax, stating that "everybody has their fun. In Little Rock, I'm an infamous thief - it was all there was to do." He began playing drums, but switched to guitar after experiencing carpal tunnel issues. He did not take guitar lessons, and took influence from 1980s artists like Metallica, Ozzy Osbourne and Mötley Crüe. Commenting on his favorite era of music, Moody said: "Honestly, I think I was born about 10 years too late. I listen to The Final Countdown by Europe once a week just for the hell of it". He called Metallica guitarist Kirk Hammett his "hero" and the reason he played guitar.

== Career ==
=== Evanescence ===
In 1994, Moody met Amy Lee in Little Rock, Arkansas while at a youth camp. The two became musical collaborators and co-founded Evanescence. They soon began playing music at local shops. Within a few years, the duo began selling EPs at local shows, culminating in their signing to Wind-up Records in 2001 and the release of their debut studio album, Fallen, in 2003. Moody abruptly left Evanescence on October 22, 2003 during their European tour, citing creative differences. On that day, while the band was in Stockolm before heading to a scheduled show in Berlin, he informed management in the U.S. that he was leaving. Lee was informed by the manager, who asked her to beg him to stay, which she declined, stating "that's exactly what he wants me to do". In Lee's termination letter to the manager, she stated that Moody was physically and verbally abusive to her.

In 2006, Moody signed with Evanescence's former management Rider Management, which sued him in 2013 for $500,000 in unpaid commissions.

In August 2010, Moody released a statement on his history with Lee and Evanescence, where he said that he was a different person at the time, his friendship with Lee had deteriorated, and they had conflicting opinions, personalities, and desires with the band. Moody apologized to Lee for comments he made to her in anger. He said he realized the band would end if he stayed and believes he made the right choice. He added, "Evanescence has progressed a great distance from the original sound, and made it clear that they intended to expand much further. Amy is very artistic and never has had a problem thinking outside of the box and defying expectations."

=== Solo projects ===
Beginning in 2004, Moody began collaborating with several artists, co-writing the track "Nobody's Home" for Avril Lavigne's second album, Under My Skin, and co-writing the track "The End Has Come" with Jason C. Miller and Jason "Gong" Jones for The Punisher soundtrack. He then wrote with David Hodges, Kelly Clarkson, and others for Clarkson's second album, Breakaway, working on the songs "Because of You" and "Addicted".

In early 2005, Moody played lead guitar for the song "Forever in Our Hearts", the 'song for tsunami relief' made exclusively for iTunes. He collaborated with singer Anastacia on the song "Everything Burns", which is featured on her album Pieces of a Dream and the Fantastic Four soundtrack. Moody then assisted Lindsay Lohan on her album A Little More Personal (Raw) and worked with Bo Bice on the song "My World" (a cover from SR-71) for his debut album The Real Thing. Moody's debut solo album, You Can't Regret What You Don't Remember, was scheduled to be released in late 2005, and would feature bassist Marty O'Brien on bass, drummer Lance Garvin, guitarist Michael "Fish" Herring, and co-vocals from Jason Miller.

In April 2006, Moody began working on the debut album of singer-songwriter Hana Pestle, co-producing and co-writing with Michael "Fish" Herring, as well as performing on the album. He later produced the Godhead album The Shadow Line with Julian Beeston, and played a clown in their music video for the song "Push". He collaborated with Hodges again on American Idol Chris Daughtry's debut album, Daughtry (2006), for the song "What About Now".

In 2007, Moody worked with Celine Dion on her album Taking Chances. It was reported that his solo album was still in the works.

In December 2008, he released the Mutiny Bootleg E.P. and announced that his solo album would be released on March 3, 2009. This release would be delayed, however, as was hinted at in February 2009, when Moody's official website displayed the release as "available 2009" instead of the March 3 release date. On June 9, 2009, Moody's debut solo album, entitled All for This, was released digitally via Amazon.com, iTunes, and Amie Street through Moody's label, FNR Records. His second album, You Can't Regret What You Don't Remember, was released on November 11, 2011.

=== Other bands ===
In June 2009, it was announced that Moody had formed the rock band called We Are the Fallen, recruiting American Idol 7 finalist Carly Smithson as the lead singer, and his friends former Evanescence drummer Rocky Gray, guitarist John LeCompt, and Marty O'Brien on bass. We Are the Fallen made their first public appearance together for a press conference at SIR Studios in Los Angeles, CA, on June 22, 2009. Their debut album, Tear the World Down was released in May 2010. The band toured for most of the year in support of the album, and filmed their first live DVD, Cirque Des Damnés, at the Avalon Theatre. The DVD was scheduled for release in late 2011.

In 2012, Moody teamed up with former Papa Roach drummer Dave Buckner, and former Rock Star Supernova frontman Lukas Rossi, to form a new band called The Halo Method. Before their debut show on the Shiprocked cruise in November 2012, former In This Moment bassist and studio engineer Josh Newell became their bassist.

=== Acting roles ===
Moody started a television and film production company, Makeshift Films. He made a cameo as a zombie in the 2004 horror film Resident Evil: Apocalypse. He also appeared in the 2007 release of the low-budget film Dead and Gone.

== Personal life ==
Moody identified as Christian and promoted his religious beliefs in interviews in the early 2000s. In 2005, he was diagnosed with bipolar disorder. He struggled with substance use during his time in Evanescence, and entered rehab after leaving the band.

Moody dated singer Hana Pestle.

== Discography ==
=== Evanescence ===
- Fallen (2003)

=== Solo ===
- "Everything Burns" (2005) - Single/Music video
- Mutiny Bootleg E.P. (2008)
- All for This (2009)
- You Can't Regret What You Don't Remember (2011)

=== We Are the Fallen ===
- Tear the World Down (2010)

=== Other appearances ===
Year	Artist	Song	Release and/or explanation	Notes
2004	Avril Lavigne	"Nobody's Home"	Under My Skin	Writing credits
2004	Ben Moody feat. Jason Miller and Jason "Gong" Jones	"The End Has Come"	The Punisher: The Album	Main performer; writing credits
2004	Kelly Clarkson (with Ben Moody, David Hodges, Marty O'Brien, and Mark Colbert)	"Because of You"	Breakaway	Writing credits, producer, and guitar
2004	Kelly Clarkson (with Ben Moody, David Hodges, Marty O'Brien, and Mark Colbert)	"Addicted"	Breakaway	Writing credits, producer, and guitar
2005	Ben Moody	"Forever in Our Hearts"	Song for tsunami relief made exclusively for iTunes	Lead guitar
2005	Ben Moody feat. Anastacia	"Everything Burns"	Fantastic 4: The Album; Pieces of a Dream	Main performer; writing credits and producer
2005	Lindsay Lohan	"Fastlane"	A Little More Personal (Raw)	Arranger, programming, producer
2005	Lindsay Lohan	"Edge of Seventeen"	A Little More Personal (Raw)	Programming and producer
2005	Bo Bice	"My World"	The Real Thing	Producer
2006	Godhead	"Push" feat. Jeffree Starr and Ben Moody	The Shadow Line	Producer
2007	Daughtry	"What About Now"	Daughtry	Writing credits
2007	Celine Dion	"Alone"	Taking Chances	Producer
2007	Celine Dion	"This Time"	Taking Chances	Writing credits and producer
2007	Celine Dion	"The Reason I Go On"	Taking Chances	Producer
2009	Daughtry	"Open Up Your Eyes"	Leave This Town	Writing credits
2009	Halestorm	"Innocence"	Halestorm	Writing credits
2010	Flyleaf	"Arise" (Ben Moody Mix)	Remember to Live	Remixer
