= Everything Burns =

2005 single by Ben Moody

Single by Ben Moody featuring Anastacia

from the album Fantastic 4: The Album
- Released: June 20, 2005
- Length: 3:41
- Label: Wind-up
- Songwriter: Ben Moody
- Producers: Ben Moody; Jay Baumgardner

Anastacia singles chronology
"Heavy on My Heart" (2005)	"Everything Burns" (2005)	"Pieces of a Dream" (2005)

"Everything Burns" is a song by American guitarist Ben Moody and American singer Anastacia for the soundtrack to the film Fantastic Four (2005) based on the Marvel comics of the same name. Released on June 20, 2005, "Everything Burns" became a top-10 hit in five European countries, including Italy, where it peaked at number two. The song's music video, directed by Antti Jokinen, was shot on April 30 and May 1, 2005, at the Culver Studios in Los Angeles.

The song was originally recorded with Canadian singer Avril Lavigne. Moody recorded a version with Hana Pestle for his 2008 EP, Mutiny Bootleg E.P.. American Idol finalist James Durbin covered the song for his 2011 debut album Memories of a Beautiful Disaster. Moody re-recorded the song in his solo album You Can't Regret What You Don't Remember, retitled "Everything Burns (In Memoriam)".

== Track listings ==
- European CD single
1. "Everything Burns" (album version) – 3:43
2. "Everything Burns" (instrumental) – 3:43
3. "Everything Burns" (video)
- European CD maxi single
1. "Everything Burns" (album version) – 3:43
2. "Everything Burns" (instrumental) – 3:43
3. "Everything Burns" (video mix) – 3:44
4. "Everything Burns" (video)

== Charts ==
=== Weekly charts ===
Chart (2005)	Peak position
Australia (ARIA)	33
Austria (Ö3 Austria Top 40)	6
Belgium (Ultratop 50 Flanders)	41
Belgium (Ultratip Bubbling Under Wallonia)	7
CIS Airplay (TopHit)	22
Denmark (Tracklisten)	11
Germany (GfK)	11
Greece (IFPI)	6
Hungary (Rádiós Top 40)	28
Italy (FIMI)	2
Netherlands (Dutch Top 40)	7
Netherlands (Single Top 100)	14
New Zealand (Recorded Music NZ)	24
Russia Airplay (TopHit)	17
Scotland Singles (Official Charts)	76
Switzerland (Schweizer Hitparade)	3
Ukraine (TopHit)	140
UK Singles (Official Charts)	95

=== Year-end charts ===
Chart (2005)	Position
Austria (Ö3 Austria Top 40)	44
CIS Airplay (TopHit)	70
Germany (Media Control GfK)	69
Italy (FIMI)	16
Russia Airplay (TopHit)	63
Switzerland (Schweizer Hitparade)	20

Chart (2006)	Position
CIS Airplay (TopHit)	191
Russia Airplay (TopHit)	182

== Sales ==
Region	Certification	Certified units/sales
Italy	—	19,000

== Release history ==
Region	Date	Format(s)	Label(s)	Ref.
United States	June 20, 2005	Contemporary hit radio	Wind-up	
Australia	August 8, 2005	CD	Wind-up	
