= Welcome to My Truth =

2004 single by Anastacia

Single by Anastacia

from the album Anastacia
- B-side: "The Saddest Part"
- Released: November 8, 2004
- Studio: Henson (Hollywood, California)
- Length: 4:03
- Label: Epic; Daylight
- Songwriters: Anastacia; Kara DioGuardi; John Shanks
- Producer: John Shanks

Anastacia singles chronology
"Sick and Tired" (2004)	"Welcome to My Truth" (2004)	"Heavy on My Heart" (2005)

Music video
- "Welcome to My Truth" on YouTube

"Welcome to My Truth" is a song by American recording artist Anastacia from her self-titled third album. Written by Anastacia, Kara DioGuardi, and John Shanks and released as the album's third single in Europe on November 8, 2004, the song chronicles Anastacia's strained relationship with her father, who left her at a young age, along with the singer's battle with breast cancer. While "Welcome to My Truth" charted within the top 20 in the Czech Republic, Denmark, Italy, the Netherlands, and Spain.

== Critical reception ==
Andy Gill of The Independent wrote that this song is connected to Anastacia's battle with cancer :"It's more likely to be the trigger behind the anthemic positivism of 'Welcome to My Truth.'"

== Music video ==
Directed by Diane Martel, the video was filmed in the Napa County, California, on July 17–18, 2004.

In the music video, a young girl is seen watching her parents having a fight, while clips are shown of Anastacia in a garden singing that "she has hit about a million walls". The father – played by actor Wade Williams – reluctantly leaves the house and waves goodbye to the little girl. At the second verse, the little girl is shown playing with toys and watching TV with her brother and mother. When the chorus reprises, the girl is at school painting a portrait of Mona Lisa, for which she is given a medal. When she gets home, she sticks the number-one prize to the refrigerator so that her mother could see it and be proud of her. The mother, however, does not take notice of her prize and walks by it, which obviously disappoints the child; it also reveals the sadness of her mother, distracted by grief.

Next, the child is shown painting a happy painting at nighttime. Anastacia is then seen hugging the girl in a garden, and as Anastacia's past and present collide we can see she is overcoming her pain. The painting the child creates represents that even though her life is not as perfect as she wants it to be, she can still be happy.

== Track listings ==
UK CD1

1. "Welcome to My Truth"
2. "Left Outside Alone" (Jason Nevins mix show edit)

UK CD2

1. "Welcome to My Truth"
2. "The Saddest Part"
3. "Left Outside Alone" (Jason Nevins global club edit)
4. "Welcome to My Truth" (live version)
5. "Welcome to My Truth" (video)

European CD single

1. "Welcome to My Truth" – 4:03
2. "The Saddest Part" – 4:10

European maxi-CD single

1. "Welcome to My Truth" – 4:03
2. "The Saddest Part" – 4:10
3. "Sick and Tired" (live from The Hospital) – 3:59
4. "Welcome to My Truth" (Video)

Australian CD single

1. "Welcome to My Truth"
2. "The Saddest Part"
3. "Sick and Tired" (live from The Hospital)

== Credits and personnel ==
Credits are taken from the European CD single liner notes and the Anastacia album booklet.

Studios

- Recorded at Henson Recording Studios (Hollywood, California)
- Mixed at South Beach Studios (Miami Beach, Florida)
- Mastered at Sterling Sound (New York City)

Personnel

- Anastacia – writing, vocals, executive production
- Kara DioGuardi – writing, background vocals
- John Shanks – writing, guitars, keyboards, production
- Paul Bushnell – bass
- Kenny Aronoff – drums
- Jeff Rothschild – recording
- Thomas R. Yezzi – recording (vocals)
- Mark Valentine – additional recording
- Shari Sutcliffe – musician contracting
- Tom Lord-Alge – mixing
- Femio Hernandez – second mix engineer
- Lisa Braudé – executive production
- Ted Jensen – mastering

== Charts ==
=== Weekly charts ===
Chart (2004)	Peak position
Australia (ARIA)	41
Austria (Ö3 Austria Top 40)	41
Belgium (Ultratip Bubbling Under Flanders)	2
Belgium (Ultratip Bubbling Under Wallonia)	3
Czech Republic (IFPI)	2
Denmark (Tracklisten)	18
Germany (GfK)	30
Hungary (Rádiós Top 40)	24
Ireland (IRMA)	23
Italy (FIMI)	14
Netherlands (Dutch Top 40)	14
Netherlands (Single Top 100)	32
Romania (Romanian Top 100)	30
Scottish Singles Sales (Official Charts)	17
Spain (Promusicae)	4
Sweden (Sverigetopplistan)	49
Switzerland (Schweizer Hitparade)	35
UK Singles (Official Charts)	25

=== Year-end charts ===
Chart (2004)	Position
Netherlands (Dutch Top 40)	120

== Release history ==
Region	Date	Format(s)	Label(s)	Ref.
Europe	November 8, 2004	CD	Epic; Daylight	
United Kingdom	November 15, 2004	CD	Epic; Daylight	
Denmark	February 21, 2005	CD	Epic; Daylight	
