= The Real Thing (Bo Bice album) =

Studio album by Bo Bice
- Released: December 13, 2005
- Studios: The Attic (Monrovia, California); Mikal Reed's House and Westlake Audio (Los Angeles, California); NRG Studios (North Hollywood, California); Henson Recording Studios (Hollywood, California); Blue Iron Gate Studios (Santa Monica, California); Starstruck Studios (Nashville, Tennessee); Sony Music Studios (New York City, New York); Mountain View Studio and The Warehouse Studio (Vancouver, British Columbia, Canada); Decibel Studios (Slussen, Stockholm, Sweden)
- Genre: Alternative rock
- Length: 40:16
- Labels: RCA; 19
- Producers: Clive Davis; Marti Frederiksen; Clif Magness; Chad Kroeger; Joey Moi; Dr. Luke; Max Martin; John Shanks; Ben Moody

Bo Bice chronology
The Real Thing (2005)	See the Light (2007)

Professional ratings
Review scores
Source	Rating
Allmusic	2/5 stars
Entertainment Weekly	C
Houston Chronicle	0.5/5 stars
Los Angeles Times	1.5/4 stars
People	2.5/4 stars
Plugged In (publication)	(positive)
Rolling Stone	2/5 stars
Slant Magazine	1/5 stars
USA Today	2/4 stars

The Real Thing is the debut studio album by American recording artist Bo Bice. It was released on December 13, 2005, through RCA Records and sold 227,000 copies in its first week, debuting at #4 on the Billboard 200 album chart. A DualDisc was also released, with a DVD side along with the CD side. The DVD included hidden tracks and a short film, A Day in the Life of Bo Bice.

== Track listing ==
The Real Thing — Standard edition
No.	Title	Writer(s)	Length
1.	"The Real Thing"	Kara DioGuardi; Marti Frederiksen	3:22
2.	"You're Everything"	Chad Kroeger	3:33
3.	"U Make Me Better"	Max Martin; Lukasz Gottwald; Jill Latiano	3:49
4.	"Nothing Without You"	Jon Bon Jovi; Richie Sambora; John Shanks	3:47
5.	"My World"	Mitch Allan; John Allen	3:18
6.	"Remember Me"	DioGuardi; Frederiksen	3:49
7.	"Hold On to Me"	Jess Cates; Dennis Matkosky; Lindy Robbins	3:48
8.	"Lie... It's Alright"	Martin; Gottwald	3:30
9.	"It's My Life"	Bo Bice; Clif Magness; DioGuardi	3:25
10.	"Willing to Try"	Shanks; Sambora	4:19
11.	"Valley of Angels"	Bice; Magness	3:35

The Real Thing — Standard edition
No.	Title	Writer(s)	Length
12.	"Cinnamon & Novocaine"	Bice	2:41
13.	"Sinner in a Sin"	Bice	3:34
14.	"Whiskey, Women and Time"	Bice	4:14

The Real Thing — DVD side of the DualDisc version
No.	Title	Writer(s)	Length
15.	"22 Minute 'A Day In The Life'" (video)
16.	"Changing for the Better" (Acoustic)
17.	"Whisky, Women and Time"" (Acoustic)	Bice	4:14
18.	"Sinner in a Sin" (Acoustic)	Bice	3:34
19.	"Papillon" (Acoustic)

== Personnel ==
Vocalists and Musicians

- Bo Bice – vocals, backing vocals (4, 7, 10, 11), electric guitar solo (11)
- Marti Frederiksen – all instruments (1, 6), backing vocals (1, 6)
- Lukasz Gottwald – all instruments (3, 8)
- Max Martin – all instruments (3, 8)
- Jamie Muhoberac – acoustic piano (4, 7, 10)
- John Shanks – keyboards (4, 7, 10), guitars (4, 7, 10), bass (4, 7, 10), backing vocals (4, 7, 10)
- Clif Magness – acoustic piano (9, 11), keyboards (9, 11), Hammond organ (9, 11), acoustic guitar (9, 11), electric guitar (9, 11), electric bass (9, 11), programming (9, 11), percussion (9, 11), arrangements (11)
- Chad Kroeger – guitars (2)
- Richie Sambora – guitar solo (4), additional backing vocals (4, 10)
- Mitch Allan – guitars (5), bass (5), backing vocals (5)
- David Spidel – bass (2)
- Ryan Brown – drums (1)
- Daniel Adair – drums (2)
- Steven Wolf – drums (3, 8)
- John Allen – drums (5), percussion (5)
- Jeff Rothschild – drums (7)
- Joey Waronker – drums (9, 11)
- Julia Waters – backing vocals (11)
- Maxine Waters – backing vocals (11)
- Oren Waters – backing vocals (11)

Production and Technical

- Stephen Ferrera – A&R
- Clive Davis – album producer
- Marti Frederiksen – producer (1, 6), recording (1, 6), mixing (1, 6)
- Chad Kroeger – producer (2)
- Joey Moi – producer (2), recording (2)
- Lukasz "Dr. Luke" Gottwald – producer (3, 8)
- Max Martin – producer (3, 8)
- John Shanks – producer (4, 7, 10)
- Ben Moody – producer (5)
- Mitch Allan – additional production (5)
- Clif Magness – producer (9, 11), engineer (9, 11), mixing (9, 11), drum recording (9, 11), BGV recording (11)
- Mikal Reid – drum recording (1)
- Brian Paturalski – mixing (1, 6)
- Randy Staub – mixing (2–5, 7. 8, 10)
- Ryan Anderson – Pro Tools engineer (2)
- Lasse Mårtén – engineer (3), recording (3)
- Todd Tidwell – engineer (3, 8), recording (3, 8)
- Josh Wilbur – engineer (3, 8), recording (3, 8)
- Jeff Rothschild – engineer (4, 7, 10)
- Dan Certa – recording (5)
- Rob Kinelski – assistant engineer (3, 8)
- Aaron Kasdorf – additional drum engineer (6), vocal recording (9), lead vocal recording (11), basic track recording (11)
- Brian Warwick – drum recording assistant (9, 11), BGV recording assistant (11)
- Jorge Vivo – additional Pro Tools editing (9, 11)
- Chris Gehringer – mastering at Sterling Sound (New York, NY)
- Shari Sutcliffe – production coordinator (4, 7, 10), music contractor (4, 7, 10)
- Gavie Boulware – management
- Simon Renshaw – management

== Charts and certifications ==
Chart	Peak position	Certification	Shipments
Billboard 200	4	Gold	688,000

== Release history ==
List of release dates, showing region, label, format and edition(s)
Region	Date	Format(s)	Label	Edition(s)
Canada	October 24, 2005	CD	Sony BMG	Standard, DualDisc, DVD
Germany	October 24, 2005	CD	Sony BMG	Standard, DualDisc, DVD
United Kingdom	October 24, 2005	CD	RCA	Standard, DualDisc, DVD
United States	December 13, 2005	CD	RCA	Standard, DualDisc, DVD
