= James Durbin (singer) =

American singer and guitarist

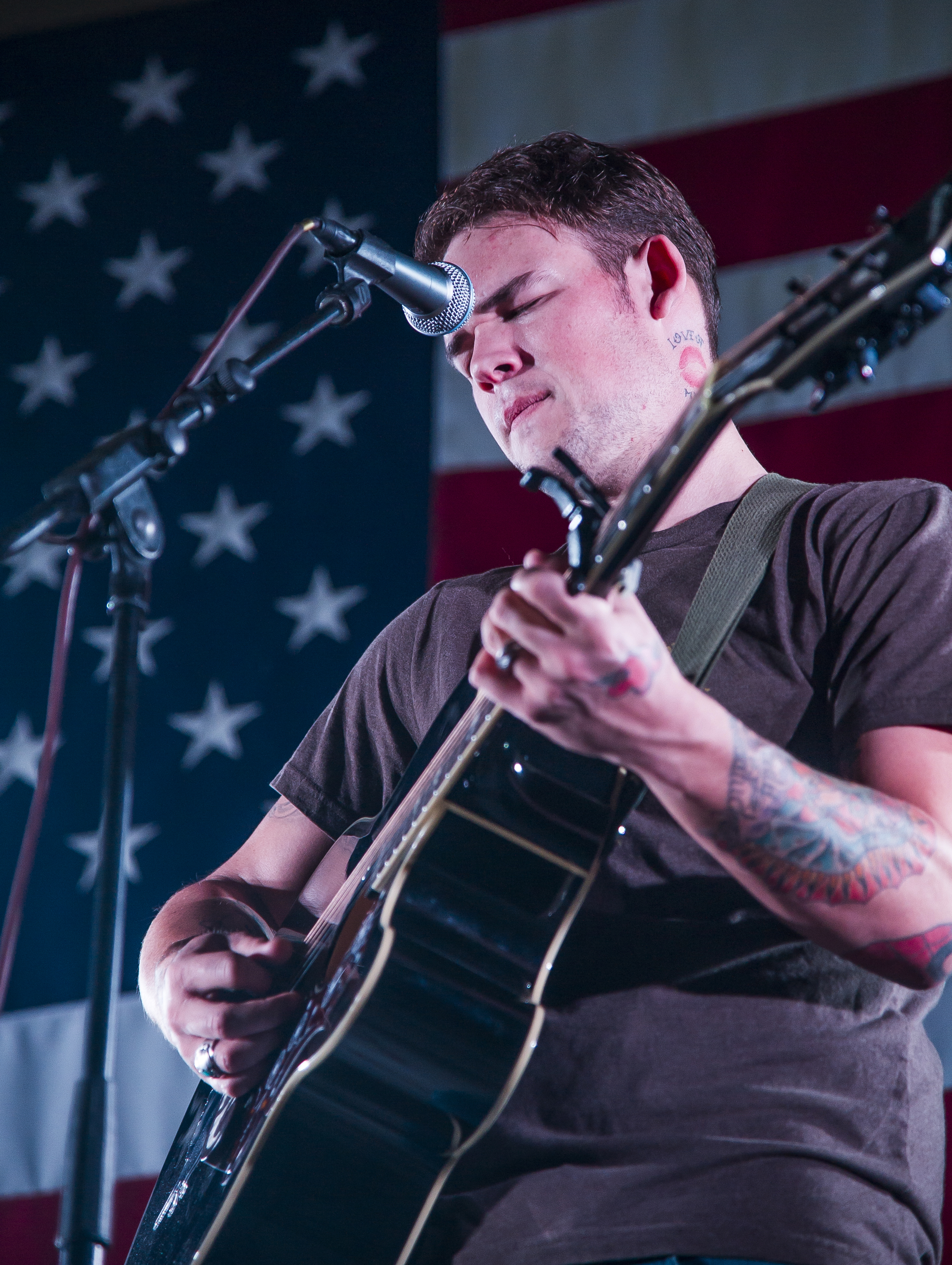
- Durbin performs at Transit Center at Manas, Kyrgyzstan, March 2014

Background information
- Born: James William Durbin; January 6, 1989 (age 37)
- Origin: Santa Cruz, California, US
- Genres: Rock, hard rock, pop rock, heavy metal
- Occupations: Singer, guitarist, songwriter
- Instruments: Vocals, guitar
- Years active: 2006–present
- Label: Wild Vine Records (Independent)
- Member of: Durbin
- Formerly of: Quiet Riot
- Website: jamesdurbinofficial.com

James William Durbin (born January 6, 1989) is an American singer and guitarist from Santa Cruz, California, who finished in fourth place on the tenth season of American Idol in 2011. Durbin was the lead singer for heavy metal band Quiet Riot from 2017 to 2019.

== Early life ==
Durbin was born in 1989 to Judy Settle-Durbin, a dentist's daughter, and Willy Durbin, a bass player who died of a heroin overdose when James was nine. He stated during his aired audition on American Idol that he was upset he didn't have the chance to know his father well. He was diagnosed with Tourette syndrome and Asperger syndrome shortly after his father died. He attended Musicschool, a music school run by Dale Ockerman in Santa Cruz instead of a traditional school. Durbin never graduated from high school. Durbin cites popular bands My Chemical Romance and Thirty Seconds to Mars as his inspirations for his music.

In 2006, he performed in a Santa Cruz children's theater group called Kids on Broadway and played the lead role in Grease and Beauty and the Beast. In 2007, he played the leading roles of Tony in West Side Story and Oscar in Sweet Charity—both productions produced by All About Theatre, a Santa Cruz community theatre company. In 2008, Durbin appeared in Alan Parsons' "Art & Science of Sound Recording" educational video series, recording a version of Parsons' "We Play The Game" at Ex'pression College for Digital Arts.

He was the lead singer in a band called Hollywood Scars, where he went by the stage name of Jimmy Levox. Influenced by bands such as Metallica, Pantera, Judas Priest, Dream Theater, Guns N' Roses, Iron Maiden and Mötley Crüe, Hollywood Scars drew their inspiration from the glitz, glam, and decadence of Hollywood's Sunset Strip in the 1980s. The band released a single, "Under the Cherry Tree." He was also in a band called Whatever Fits. He has also sung country music.

== Career ==
=== American Idol ===
Durbin had previously auditioned for American Idol in the eighth season, but was not chosen.

Durbin was eliminated in the Top 4 on the tenth season, but despite his elimination, he received a homecoming previously reserved for Top 3 contestants, the first time such an exception on the homecoming policy was made by the show. Footage of his homecoming, dubbed the "Durbin Day", was shown briefly on the Top 3 performance show.

He appeared on the American Idol tenth-season finale, singing "Livin' After Midnight" and "Breaking the Law" with Judas Priest.

==== Performances and results ====
Episode	Theme	Song choice	Original artist	Order #	Result
Audition	Auditioner's Choice	"You Shook Me"	Muddy Waters	N/A	Advanced
Audition	Auditioner's Choice	"Dream On"	Aerosmith	N/A	Advanced
Hollywood Round, Part 1	First Solo	"Oh! Darling"	The Beatles	N/A	Advanced
Hollywood Round, Part 2	Group Performance	"Somebody to Love"	Queen	N/A	Advanced
Hollywood Round, Part 3	Second Solo	"I Don't Want to Miss a Thing"	Aerosmith	N/A	Advanced
Las Vegas Round	Songs of The Beatles; Group Performance	"Get Back"	The Beatles	N/A	Advanced
Hollywood Round Final	Final Solo	"A Change Is Gonna Come"	Sam Cooke	N/A	Advanced
Top 24 (12 Men)	Personal Choice	"You've Got Another Thing Comin'"	Judas Priest	6	Advanced
Top 13	Your Personal Idol	"Maybe I'm Amazed"	Paul McCartney	6	Safe
Top 12	Year You Were Born	"I'll Be There for You"	Bon Jovi	4	Safe
Top 11	Motown	"Living for the City"	Stevie Wonder	11	Safe
Top 11^{1}	Elton John	"Saturday Night's Alright for Fighting"	Elton John	7	Safe
Top 9	Rock & Roll Hall of Fame	"While My Guitar Gently Weeps"	The Beatles	5	Safe
Top 8	Songs from the Movies	"Heavy Metal" – Heavy Metal	Sammy Hagar	8	Safe
Top 7	Songs from the 21st Century	"Uprising"	Muse	2	Safe
Top 6	Carole King	Solo "Will You Love Me Tomorrow"	The Shirelles	5	Safe
Top 6	Carole King	Duet "I'm into Something Good" with Jacob Lusk	Earl-Jean	9	Safe
Top 5	Songs from Now and Then	"Closer to the Edge"	Thirty Seconds to Mars	1	Safe
Top 5	Songs from Now and Then	"Without You"	Badfinger	6	Safe
Top 4	Songs That Inspire	"Don't Stop Believin'"	Journey	1	Eliminated
Top 4	Leiber & Stoller Songbook	"Love Potion No. 9"	The Clovers	8	Eliminated

- ^Note 1 Due to the judges using their one save to save Casey Abrams, the Top 11 remained intact for another week, when two contestants were eliminated.

=== Post-Idol ===
After his elimination Durbin appeared on The Tonight Show with Jay Leno, Live with Regis and Kelly, Late Night with Jimmy Fallon, and The Ellen DeGeneres Show. Along with the rest of the Top 11 finalists, he participated in the American Idol Tour that season.

He appeared in a documentary, Different Is The New Normal, that focused on a teen's effort to overcome Tourette syndrome.

Durbin is being managed by 19 Entertainment, alongside fellow contestants Pia Toscano and Haley Reinhart. It was announced that he was signed to Wind-up Records on September 5, 2011.

On May 28, 2011, Durbin and the other American Idol top 4 performed at the opening of the new Microsoft Store at Lenox Square Mall in Atlanta, Georgia.

Durbin, along with fellow contestants Scotty McCreery, Lauren Alaina, and Haley Reinhart, released a Walmart Exclusive EP with his highlights from American Idol. The tracks feature "Will You Still Love Me Tomorrow", "Uprising" and a previously unreleased recording of "Good Riddance (Time of Your Life)".

=== Memories of a Beautiful Disaster (2011–2012) ===
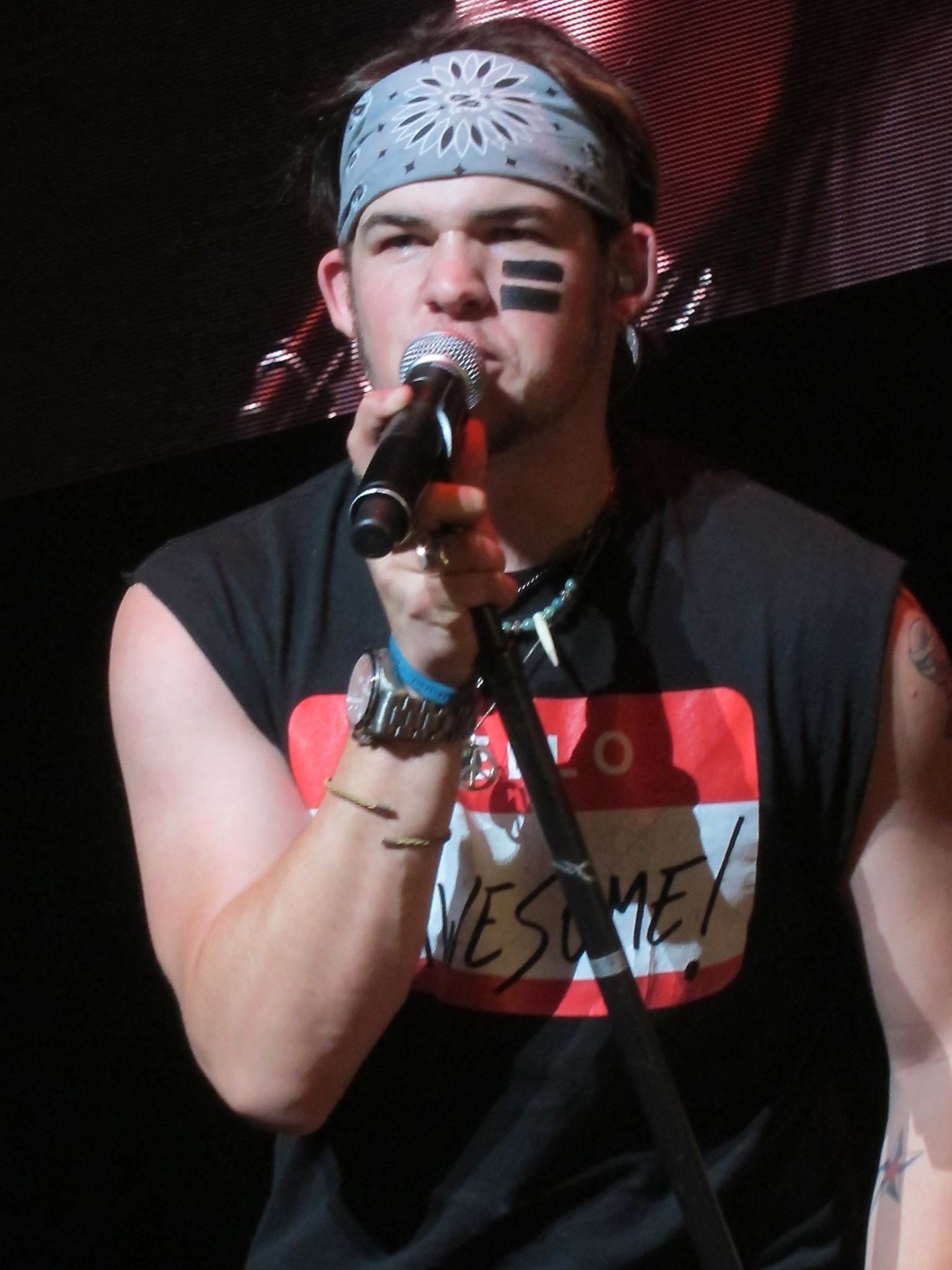
Durbin performing on the American Idols Live Tour

Durbin started working on his debut album after appearing on American Idol, and wrote with James Michael and Marti Frederiksen, as well as his favorite band Hardcore Superstar. The album was produced by Howard Benson. He recorded a track entitled "Stand Up" for the album Official Gameday Music of the NFL, Volume 2 which was released for sale on September 27, 2011. The song was also included in his album.

On November 21, 2011, Durbin released the album, titled Memories of a Beautiful Disaster. The album debuted at number 36 on the Billboard 200, at number eight on the Billboard Rock Chart, number 25 on the Digital Album Chart, and sold 28,000 the first week. Two singles were released to radio simultaneously—"Love Me Bad" was released to Top 40 radio stations, while "Stand Up" was released to rock radio.

Durbin released a Christmas single, "Santa Claus Is Back in Town" on November 27, 2012.

Durbin performed "Love Me Bad" on Conan and "Higher Than Heaven" on American Idol in support of his album.

=== Celebrate (2013–2014) ===
Durbin's second album, Celebrate, was released April 8, 2014. It was produced by Scott "The Ninja" Stevens and Durbin co wrote songs with Scott Stevens, Ted Bruner, Griffin Boyce and Stevie Aiello. The first single, "Parachute", was released on November 22, 2013.

Durbin performed "Parachute" on Conan in support of his album.

=== Riot on Sunset (2015–2016) ===
In 2015, Durbin raised funds for his third album via PledgeMusic. In November 2015, Durbin released a Christmas EP, A Thrill of Hope. He released the video for his first single "Smackdown" in April 2016.

On April 7, 2016, Durbin returned to Idol for the final episode of the fifteenth season.

On Durbin's 28th birthday, he released a stop motion animated music video he made with his son Hunter.

In 2016 Durbin and Alex Grossi of Quiet Riot worked on an album project "Maps to the Hollywood Scars". Volume 1 was released as a 5-song EP in February 2017.

=== Quiet Riot (2017–2019) ===
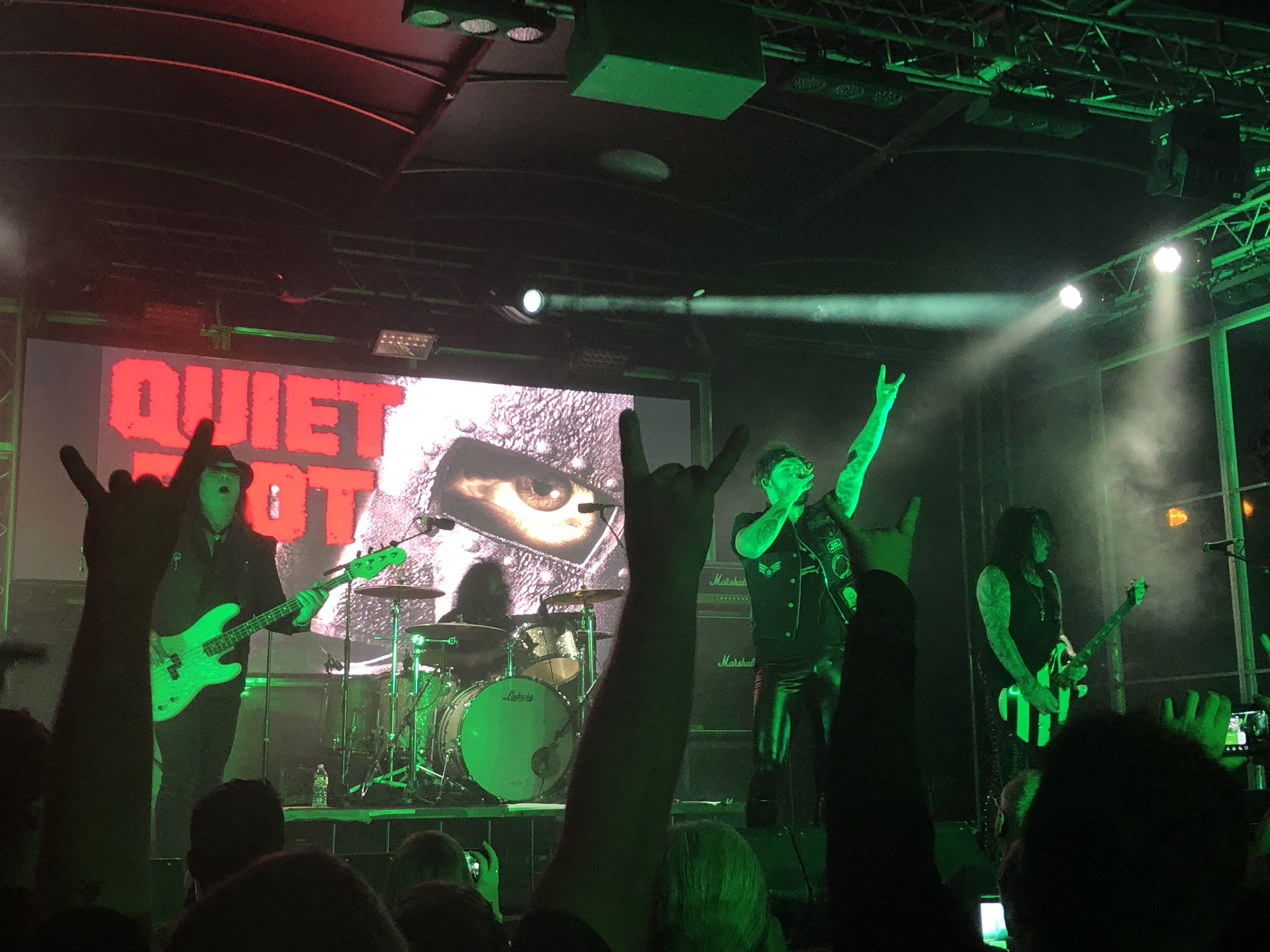
Quiet Riot concert in Dallas, Texas, October 5, 2018

In March 2017, Durbin joined Quiet Riot, as their new lead singer. The band reported that their upcoming album, Road Rage would be re-recorded prior to its release to feature Durbin on lead vocals. After recording a follow-up album, Durbin quit the band in September 2019. The album, Hollywood Cowboys, was released on November 8, 2019.

=== The Beast Awakens (2020–2021) ===
In October 2020, Durbin revealed he had signed with Frontiers Records and was working on a "pure heavy metal" album. The Beast Awakens was released on February 12, 2021, under the Durbin moniker. Alongside Durbin, who performs lead vocals and rhythm guitar, the album also features drummer Mike Vanderhule and bassist Barry Sparks.

=== From the New World (2022) ===
Durbin appeared on Alan Parsons' 2022 album, From the New World, singing "Give 'Em My Love".

In the same year he was among the founding members of Cleanbreak.

=== Screaming Steel (2023–present) ===
Durbin's second heavy metal album under his moniker, Screaming Steel, was released on February 16, 2024. He released the title track to the album along with a music video.

As of 2024, Durbin performs with eight different bands including the 1980s tribute band, Tainted Love, the yacht rock tribute band, Mustache Harbor, the 1980s metal tribute band, Mëtal Strëet Böyz, and his own 1970s and 1980s tribute band, The Lost Boys.

== Personal life ==
Durbin married Heidi Air Lowe on December 31, 2011. They have a son and two daughters. Durbin is an avid fan of professional wrestling.

== Discography ==
=== Solo career ===
Studio albums

Title	Details	Peak chart positions			Sales
Title	Details	US	US Digital	US Rock	Sales
Memories of a Beautiful Disaster	Release date: November 21, 2011; Label: Wind-up; Format: CD, digital download	36	25	8	US: 123,000
Celebrate	Release date: April 8, 2014; Label: Wind-up; Format: CD, digital download	83	—	14	
Riot on Sunset	Release date: July 15, 2016; Independent Release; Format: CD, Vinyl, download	—	—	—	
"—" denotes releases that did not chart

Extended plays

Title	Details	Peak chart positions			Sales
Title	Details	US	US Rock	CAN	Sales
American Idol Season 10 Highlights: James Durbin	Release date: June 28, 2011; Label: 19, Interscope; Format: Digital download	31	7	52	US: 71,000

Singles

Year	Single	Peak chart positions		Sales	Album
Year	Single	US Adult	US Main	Sales	Album
2011	"Stand Up"	—	39	US: 12,000	Memories of a Beautiful Disaster
2011	"Love Me Bad"	32	—	US: 11,000	Memories of a Beautiful Disaster
2012	"Higher Than Heaven"	—	—	US: 13,000	Memories of a Beautiful Disaster
2012	"Santa Claus Is Back in Town"	—	—		Non-album single
2013	"Parachute"	—	—		Celebrate
2016	"Smackdown"	—	—		Riot on Sunset
"—" denotes releases that did not chart

=== with Quiet Riot ===
Studio albums

- Road Rage (2018)
- Hollywood Cowboys (2019)

Live album

- One Night in Milan (2019)

=== with Durbin ===
Studio albums

- The Beast Awakens (2021)
- Screaming Steel (2024)
