= Anastacia (album) =

Studio album by Anastacia
- Released: March 29, 2004
- Recorded: September 2003 – February 2004
- Studios: Cello (Hollywood); Henson (Hollywood); Record Plant (Hollywood); Cove City Sound (Glen Cove, New York); Criteria (Miami); Larrabee East (Hollywood); Neptune Valley (Los Angeles); O'Henry (Burbank, California); Record One (Los Angeles); Sony (New York City)
- Genres: Pop; power pop; rock
- Length: 48:39
- Label: Epic
- Producers: Dallas Austin; Glen Ballard; Richie Jones; Patrick Leonard; John Shanks; Dave Stewart; Ric Wake

Anastacia chronology
Freak of Nature (2001)	Anastacia (2004)	Pieces of a Dream (2005)

Singles from Anastacia
- 1. "Left Outside Alone" Released: March 15, 2004; 2. "Sick and Tired" Released: July 19, 2004; 3. "Welcome to My Truth" Released: November 8, 2004; 4. "Heavy on My Heart" Released: March 7, 2005

Anastacia is the third studio album by American singer Anastacia. It was released on March 29, 2004, by Epic Records. Primarily a pop, power pop and rock album, Anastacia also includes elements of soul and R&B. It was a commercial success, peaking at the top of the albums charts in several countries, including Australia, Belgium, Germany, Greece, the Netherlands, Sweden, and the United Kingdom, and becoming one of the top 10 best-selling albums of the year in much of Europe. The album has sold eight million copies.

The album was never released in Anastacia's native United States, despite plans for an August 30, 2005, release, which was ultimately canceled for unknown reasons. Years later, however, it was officially released in the United States digitally. Anastacia promoted the album with television performances and interviews. To further promote the album, Anastacia embarked on the Live at Last Tour in 2004, her first headlining tour.

== Background ==
In January 2003, Anastacia had discovered that she had breast cancer when she was preparing for breast reduction surgery due to orthopedic reasons. Anastacia subsequently established the Anastacia Fund through The Breast Cancer Research Foundation to promote awareness of breast cancer amongst younger women.

After this traumatic experience, Anastacia entered recording studios in September 2003 to record the Anastacia album with Glen Ballard, Dallas Austin, and Dave Stewart for release in 2004. Anastacia was after more of a rock feel on the album, as noted in tracks such as "Seasons Change", "Time", and "I Do" (which features Sonny Sandoval from P.O.D.).

Anastacia explained on her website that her illness made it more difficult to record the album:

"... the experience was not pleasant. I usually look for the bright side of things, but so far nothing about making this record was positive for me. My doctor told me I'd be tired, not stupid. I could not focus on anything. I'd write a verse and then I couldn't write the chorus or I'd write the chorus but couldn't write the bridge. I couldn't talk, I couldn't think straight, I was totally out of it. The doctors said I'd be tired—but of course I had insomnia. It was tough..."

She struggled through the process to finish the album for release in March 2004.

== Promotion ==
Anastacia spawned several single. The album's lead single "Left Outside Alone" peaked at number one in Australia, Austria, Italy, Spain, and Switzerland, and reaching the top five in several other countries and on the European Hot 100 Singles chart. The album also spawned another three singles: "Sick and Tired", "Welcome to My Truth", and "Heavy on My Heart". "Sick and Tired" was the most successful of the three, charting inside the top five across numerous European nations, almost matching the success of "Left Outside Alone". "Welcome to My Truth" earned Anastacia her best-selling single ever in Spain and gained moderate European airplay and sales success, while "Heavy on My Heart" fared slightly worse, while proceeds from the single were donated to the Anastacia Fund.

== Critical reception ==
Professional ratings
Review scores
Source	Rating
AllMusic	4.5/5 stars
The Encyclopedia of Popular Music	3/5 stars
Evening Standard	2/3 stars
The Guardian	3/5 stars
The Independent	2/5 stars
laut.de	4/5 stars
Stylus Magazine	C
Yahoo! Music	(7/10)

AllMusic editor Matthew Chisling rated the album four and a half out of five stars. He called Anastacia a "transition album for a multi-dimensional artist as she shifted from disco flavor into passionate power pop [...] Packed with pop numbers that overlay into rock and soul, Anastacia envelops the listener into a painstaking reality that horrified the singer [...] Overall, Anastacia is truly an artist's record, where listeners get a bird's eye view into the minds of a covertly dark Anastacia whose musical imagination is finally allowed to blossomed due to the catalytic effect of a terrible tragedy that overcame her." Chris Ellwell-Sutton from Evening Standard found that the singer had "developed a grittier rock sound that works well on tracks such as "Left Outside Alone," a big, banging barnstormer that sounds like a hit [...] And, despite the presence of a few lighters-in-the-air power ballads that may prove a little sickly sweet for British ears, Anastacia is back on top of her game." Yahoo! Music's Dan Gennoe described Anastacia as the "US rock of the bright and glossy kind" that was clearly drawing from co-writer Glen Ballard's work on Michael Jackson's "Man in the Mirror and Alanis Morissette's Jagged Little Pill. He added that "choruses are so strong, and rammed home so many times and with such unflinching conviction that they're almost unquestionable, impossible to ignore."

Caroline Sullivan, writing for The Guardian, called the album a "particularly gut-busting affair. Endowed with a muscular alto that automatically storms to the top of its range on almost every song, she's nothing if not confident, and a lesson to the twittery Kylies of this world. But while her complete immersion in what US radio would call "modern rock" is commercially timely, it comes up short in the light-and-shade department. With ballads restricted to a couple of strummy ambles, it's a full-on, outta-my-way stomp that leaves you worse for wear within minutes." Stylus Magazine's Dom Passantino found that despite some weaker filler tracks, Anastacia was provning herself a daring and skilled artist with the album, blending unexpected influences into genuinely compelling singles like "Left Outside Alone" and "Sick and Tired"." Andy Gill from The Independent felt that the album's "fusion of soul, pop and rock" was "lacking the usual curiosity of eclecticism, which has supplanted the funkier sound of [her] previous album. It's not, in all honesty, a good move, effectively ironing out the idiosyncratic wrinkles of her style to fit a drab heavy-rock sound. Her voice remains a commanding instrument of awesome power, well beyond the capabilities of most R&B divas and talent-show popstrels, but it's undersold in these surroundings, leaving her sounding more like the 21st-century Bonnie Tyler."

== Commercial performance ==
Anastacia proved to be a huge commercial success. It topped the charts in 11 European countries, including Austria, Germany, the Netherlands, Switzerland, Sweden, and the United Kingdom, while reaching number two in Ireland, Italy, Portugal, and Spain. The album spent seven consecutive weeks at number one on Billboard's European Top 100 Albums chart in April and May 2004, before reclaiming the spot once more in July that year. In the United Kingdom opened atop the UK Albums Chart, selling 87,000 units in its first week of release.

== Track listing ==
Anastacia track listing
No.	Title	Writer(s)	Producer(s)	Length
1.	"Seasons Change"	Anastacia; Kara DioGuardi; John Rzeznik	Glen Ballard	4:17
2.	"Left Outside Alone"	Anastacia; Dallas Austin; Ballard	Austin; Ballard	4:17
3.	"Time"	Anastacia; Ballard; Austin	Ballard; Austin	3:33
4.	"Sick and Tired"	Anastacia; Ballard; Austin	Ballard; Austin	3:30
5.	"Heavy on My Heart"	Anastacia; Billy Mann	Ballard	4:26
6.	"I Do" (featuring Sonny of P.O.D.)	Anastacia; DioGuardi; Lukas Burton; Danny Weissfeld	Ric Wake; Richie Jones^{[a]}	3:04
7.	"Welcome to My Truth"	Anastacia; DioGuardi; John Shanks	Shanks	4:03
8.	"Pretty Little Dum Dum"	Anastacia; Ballard; DioGuardi	Ballard	4:37
9.	"Sexy Single"	Anastacia; Dave Stewart	Stewart	3:52
10.	"Rearview"	Anastacia; DioGuardi; Shanks	Shanks	4:12
11.	"Where Do I Belong"	Anastacia; DioGuardi; Patrick Leonard	Leonard	3:26
12.	"Maybe Today"	Anastacia; Stewart	Stewart	5:17
Total length:				48:39

Japanese edition bonus track
No.	Title	Writer(s)	Producer(s)	Length
13.	"Left Outside Alone" (Jason Nevins Global Club Edit)	Anastacia; Austin; Ballard	Austin; Ballard; Nevins^{[b]}	4:16
Total length:				52:55

Limited edition bonus DVD
No.	Title	Length
1.	"The Making of Anastacia"
2.	"2002 Europe Promo Tour"
3.	"Photo Gallery"

Notes

- ^{^a} signifies an additional producer
- ^{^b} signifies a remixer

== Charts ==
=== Weekly charts ===
Weekly chart performance for Anastacia
Chart (2004)	Peak position
Australian Albums (ARIA)	1
Austrian Albums (Ö3 Austria)	1
Belgian Albums (Ultratop Flanders)	1
Belgian Albums (Ultratop Wallonia)	5
Czech Albums (ČNS IFPI)	3
Danish Albums (Hitlisten)	1
Dutch Albums (Album Top 100)	1
European Albums (Billboard)	1
Finnish Albums (Suomen virallinen lista)	3
French Albums (SNEP)	14
German Albums (Offizielle Top 100)	1
Greek International Albums (IFPI)	1
Hungarian Albums (MAHASZ)	4
Irish Albums (IRMA)	2
Italian Albums (FIMI)	2
New Zealand Albums (RMNZ)	26
Norwegian Albums (VG-lista)	1
Polish Albums (ZPAV)	16
Portuguese Albums (AFP)	2
Scottish Albums (Official Charts)	1
South African Albums (RISA)	11
Spanish Albums (PROMUSICAE)	2
Swedish Albums (Sverigetopplistan)	1
Swiss Albums (Schweizer Hitparade)	1
UK Albums (Official Charts)	1

=== Monthly charts ===
Monthly chart performance for Anastacia
Chart (2004)	Peak position
Russian Albums (NFPF)	4

=== Year-end charts ===
2004 year-end chart performance for Anastacia
Chart (2004)	Position
Australian Albums (ARIA)	14
Austrian Albums (Ö3 Austria)	2
Belgian Albums (Ultratop Flanders)	6
Belgian Albums (Ultratop Wallonia)	38
Dutch Albums (Album Top 100)	2
European Albums (Billboard)	2
Finnish Albums (Suomen virallinen lista)	21
French Albums (SNEP)	46
German Albums (Offizielle Top 100)	1
Hungarian Albums (MAHASZ)	32
Irish Albums (IRMA)	18
Italian Albums (FIMI)	8
Portuguese Albums (AFP)	9
Spanish Albums (PROMUSICAE)	8
Swedish Albums (Sverigetopplistan)	11
Swiss Albums (Schweizer Hitparade)	1
UK Albums (OCC)	6
Worldwide Albums (IFPI)	15

2005 year-end chart performance for Anastacia
Chart (2005)	Position
Dutch Albums (Album Top 100)	99
French Albums (SNEP)	161
German Albums (Offizielle Top 100)	55
Italian Albums (FIMI)	99
Swiss Albums (Schweizer Hitparade)	94

=== Decade-end charts ===
Decade-end chart performance for Anastacia
Chart (2000–2009)	Position
UK Albums (OCC)	99

== Certifications ==
Certifications for Anastacia
Region	Certification	Certified units/sales
Australia (ARIA)	2× Platinum	140,000^{^}
Austria (IFPI Austria)	2× Platinum	60,000^{*}
Belgium (BRMA)	Gold	25,000^{*}
Denmark (IFPI Danmark)	Platinum	40,000^{^}
Finland (Musiikkituottajat)	Platinum	35,089
France (SNEP)	Gold	100,000^{*}
Germany (BVMI)	4× Platinum	800,000^{^}
Greece (IFPI Greece)	Platinum	20,000^{^}
Hungary (MAHASZ)	Gold	10,000^{^}
Italy (FIMI)	2× Platinum	200,000^{*}
Netherlands (NVPI)	Platinum	80,000^{^}
Norway (IFPI Norway)	Platinum	40,000^{*}
Portugal (AFP)	Gold	20,000^{^}
Spain (Promusicae)	2× Platinum	200,000^{^}
Sweden (GLF)	Platinum	60,000^{^}
Switzerland (IFPI Switzerland)	3× Platinum	120,000^{^}
United Kingdom (BPI)	4× Platinum	1,200,000^{^}
Summaries
Europe (IFPI)	3× Platinum	3,000,000^{*}
^{*} Sales figures based on certification alone.^{^} Shipments figures based on certification alone.

== Release history ==
Anastacia release history
Region	Date	Label	Ref.
United Kingdom	March 29, 2004	Epic	
Germany	March 29, 2004	Sony	
Italy	March 29, 2004	Sony	
Japan	June 9, 2004	Sony Japan	
