= Bo Bice =

American singer and musician (born 1975)

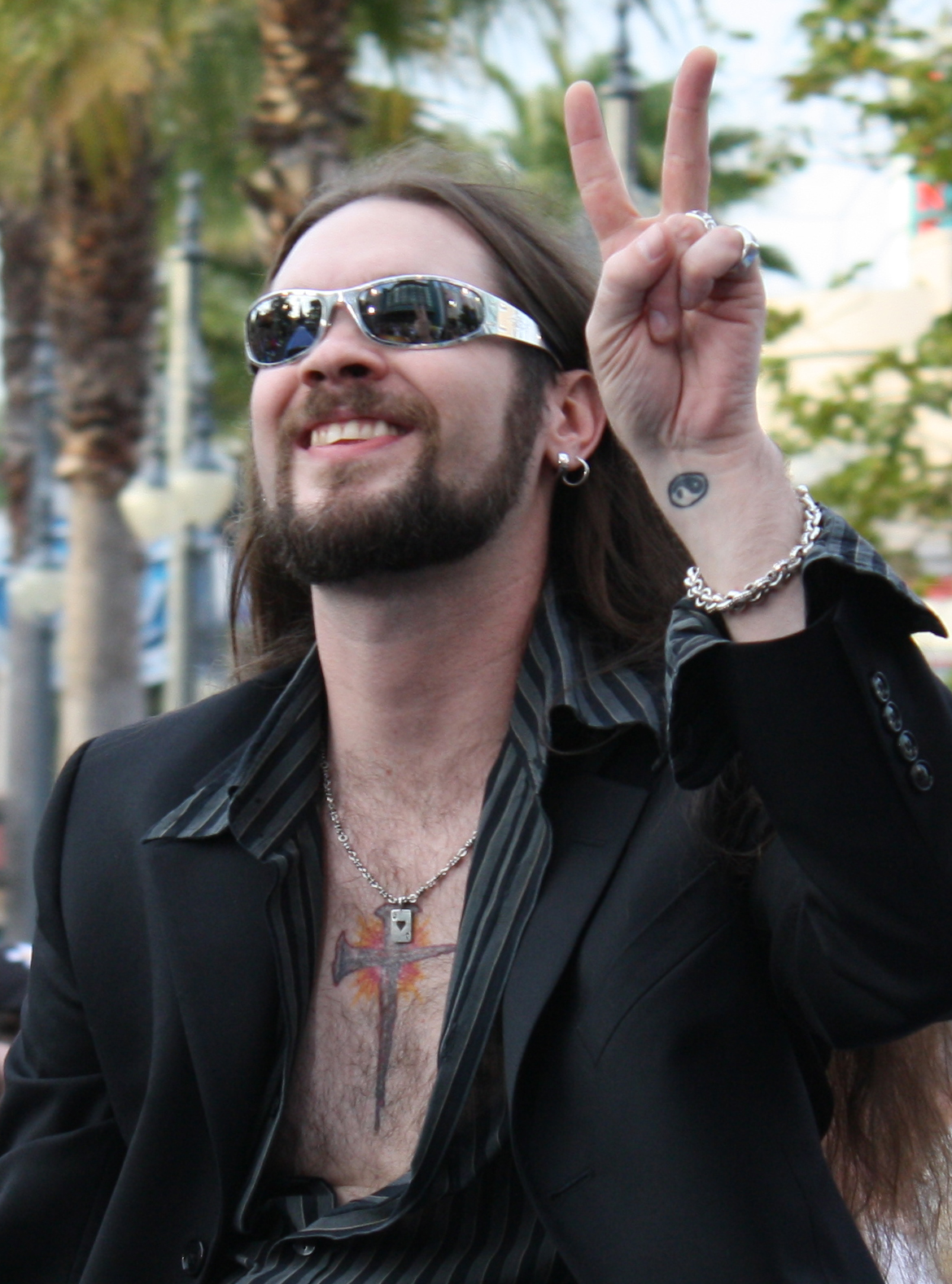
- Bice in 2009

Background information
- Born: Harold Elwin Bice Jr. November 1, 1975 (age 51); Huntsville, Alabama, U.S.
- Origin: Helena, Alabama, U.S.
- Genres: Pop rock; Southern rock; hard rock; country rock
- Occupations: Singer; musician
- Instruments: Acoustic guitar; electric guitar; lap steel guitar; mandolin; harmonica; piano; saxophone; vocals
- Years active: 1994–present
- Labels: RCA; Sugarmoney; Saguaro Road; Lofton Creek
- Formerly of: SugarMoney; Blood, Sweat & Tears

Harold Elwin "Bo" Bice Jr. (born November 1, 1975) is an American singer and musician who was the runner-up against Carrie Underwood in the fourth season of American Idol. Prior to auditioning for American Idol, Bice released a solo album as well as a few albums with his bands while performing on the night club circuit.

Bice charted in 2005 at number two on the Billboard Hot 100 with a rendition of "Inside Your Heaven" from American Idol. He released the album The Real Thing after American Idol to minor success before being dropped by RCA Records. He started his own record label Sugar Money and subsequently released two more albums, See the Light and 3. He was also the lead singer of Blood, Sweat & Tears from 2013 until 2018.

== Early life and education ==
Bice was born as Harold Elwin Bice, Jr. on November 1, 1975, in Huntsville, Alabama to Nancy and Harold Elwin Bice. His mother was a gospel singer as were his grandmother, great-grandmother, and aunts. Bice was nicknamed "Bogart" as a newborn by his grandmother, "Granny Madge", because she thought he had "Humphrey Bogart eyes". His family continued to call him Bogart, but when Bice was in kindergarten he shortened it to "Bo" because he did not think Bogart was cool. Bice's parents divorced when he was very young, and his mother remarried years later.

Bice grew up with his mother and step-father, Earle Downes, a Coca-Cola manager, step-sisters Jenny and Sharan Downes, and half-brother John Cohran. Bice has two other half-siblings, Candace and Matthew, on his biological father's side. The Downes family moved around the South frequently. They lived in Georgia, Alabama, and Florida, including the metro area of Atlanta. In 1990, when Bice was 14 years old, they moved to England, as part of his step-father's European assignment with Coca-Cola in London.

Bice spent his teenage years living in Gerrards Cross. Bice attended London Central High School, a Department of Defense school primarily for children whose parents served in the military or worked at the U.S. Embassy. In high school, he carried his guitar everywhere and played football. It was around this time when Bice worked with some English alternative rock musicians. He formed his first band, Spinning Jenny, while living there. Bice would have graduated in 1994, but in the fall of 1993, Bice dropped out of high school just before turning 18 to move back to Alabama, where he earned his GED and attended classes at Calhoun Community College from November 1996 to May 1997.

== Career ==
=== Career beginnings and American Idol: 1997–2005 ===
Upon leaving Calhoun and spending one semester at the University of North Alabama in Florence, Bice turned professional and performed in shows all across the United States, the United Kingdom, Ireland, and Europe. He was a veteran of the nightclub circuit, releasing his first CD in 1995 with his band Purge. His other pre-Idol bands include Blue Suede Nickel and SugarMoney. Among his credits were opening for Blackfoot and Warrant as well as performing live and recording with Johnny Neel, formerly of The Allman Brothers Band. Bice had recorded other albums prior to his stint on American Idol, which included Ex Gratia (1999) with his band Purge, and Recipe for Flavor (2000) with SugarMoney.

In 2001, Bice was charged with purchasing cocaine at a strip club. Two years later, Bice was arrested again for possession of marijuana, drug paraphernalia and public intoxication. In lieu of serving jail time, Bice agreed to enter a drug rehabilitation program.

For the 2005 season, Idol producers raised their required age limit from 16–24 to 16–28. In August 2004, Bice’s mother and several other family members encouraged him to go try out, since he was within the eligible age limit (he would turn 29 in November 2004). Along with Constantine Maroulis and Taylor Hicks (winner of Season 5), Bice was one of the oldest contestants to audition and participate on American Idol. Bice and Maroulis were among the first contestants to compete using the rock idiom. His performance in the audition stage of The Allman Brothers Band's song "Whipping Post" drew raves from the judges. His later performances established him as one of the favorites in the competition. During the final three performance show, Bice performed without a band or backup singers. He sang "In a Dream", a song recorded by Badlands.

In June 2005, Bice was quoted in Rolling Stone magazine that his last thought during the Idol finale was, "Please, God, don't let me win this thing." In comments during a subsequent appearance on The Today Show, Bice backed off this stance a bit, saying that he thanked all those who had voted for him. He lost the final, ending up runner-up to Carrie Underwood. In Alabama, May 24 was declared "Bo Bice Day" by Governor Bob Riley. Two members of the group Lynyrd Skynyrd surprised Bice during his trip home from Idol and performed "Sweet Home Alabama" with him in his home town of Helena, Alabama.

Idol performances

| Week | Theme | Song | Original artist | Result |
|---|---|---|---|---|
| Auditions | Contestant's Choice | "In a Dream" | Badlands | Advanced |
| Auditions | Contestant's Choice | "Whipping Post" | The Allman Brothers Band | Advanced |
| Hollywood Round 1 | Contestant's Choice | "The Letter" | The Box Tops | Advanced |
| Hollywood Round 2 | Contestant's Choice | "God Bless the USA" | Lee Greenwood | Advanced |
| Hollywood Round 3 | Contestant's Choice | "Buddy Holly" | Weezer | Advanced |
| Top 50 | Contestant's Choice | "Get Ready" | The Temptations | Advanced |
| Top 24 | Contestant's Choice | "Drift Away" | John Henry Kurtz | Safe |
| Top 20 | Contestant's Choice | "Whipping Post" | The Allman Brothers Band | Safe |
| Top 16 | Contestant's Choice | "I'll Be" | Edwin McCain | Safe |
| Top 12 | Song of the 1960s | "Spinning Wheel" | Blood, Sweat & Tears | Safe |
| Top 11 | Billboard Number Ones | "Time in a Bottle" | Jim Croce | Safe |
| Top 10 | 1990s | "Remedy" | The Black Crowes | Safe |
| Top 9 | Classic Broadway | "Corner of the Sky" | from Pippin | Safe |
| Top 8 | Year They Were Born | "Free Bird" | Lynyrd Skynyrd | Bottom 2 |
| Top 7 | 1970s Dance Music | "Vehicle" | The Ides of March | Safe |
| Top 6 | 21st Century | "I Don't Want to Be" | Gavin DeGraw | Safe |
| Top 5 | Leiber & Stoller; Current Billboard Chart | "Stand by Me" "Heaven" | Ben E. King; Los Lonely Boys | Safe |
| Top 4 | Country; Gamble & Huff | "It's a Great Day to Be Alive" "For the Love of Money" | Jon Randall; The O'Jays | Safe |
| Top 3 | Clive Davis' Choice; Judge's Choice; Contestant's Choice | "Don't Let the Sun Go Down on Me" "(I Can't Get No) Satisfaction" "In a Dream" | Elton John; The Rolling Stones; Badlands | Safe |
| Finale | Idol Single; Contestant's Choice; Contestant's Choice | "Inside Your Heaven" "Long Long Road" "Vehicle" | Carrie Underwood/Bo Bice; Christian Leuzzi; The Ides of March | Runner Up |

=== Post-Idol, marriage and fatherhood: 2005 ===
Signed to RCA Records, Bice's first single, released June 21, 2005, was his version of "Inside Your Heaven". The single debuted at number two on the Billboard Hot 100 Chart and number one on the Billboard Hot Single Sales chart. Bice's single replaced Carrie Underwood's version of the same song at number one. It was certified Gold in late July 2005. Bice was invited to the Bonnaroo Music Festival by Trey Anastasio. He sang a song with Willie Nelson at a Birmingham concert and was invited by Nelson to perform at Farm Aid. Bice appeared on Carlos Santana's 2005 album All That I Am with the song "Brown Skin Girl". On June 15, 2005, Bice married long-time girlfriend Caroline Fisher in Helena, Alabama. Bice had met her when he was working as a guitar store manager, and frequented the Ragtime Cafe in Hoover, Alabama where she was working her way through college as a waitress. Their first child, a son, was born in September 2005. A second son was born in August 2008. A third son was born in January 2010 and this was Ean Bice. Their fourth child and first daughter was born in April 2012. They reside in Covington, Georgia.

On July 31, 2005, Bice broke his foot while performing in concert in Manchester, New Hampshire but carried on with the tour. On August 18, Bice, who had been suffering from stomach pain for months, was rushed to the hospital for emergency intestinal surgery to remove a blockage caused by a life-threatening intestinal condition called intussusception. He was sidelined from the tour for several shows. During his absence from the tour, fellow contestants Anwar, Nikko, Scott, Anthony and Constantine paid tribute to Bice by singing "Sweet Home Alabama" and wearing Bo Bice T-shirts. Bice returned to the tour for the final two concerts in Syracuse, New York, September 10 and September 11 (a benefit concert with proceeds going to the American Red Cross to help victims of Hurricane Katrina). In addition to playing that concert, he opened his home in Helena, Alabama to a family displaced by Hurricane Katrina.

On October 7, 2005, Bice introduced his own band, SugarMoney, in Mobile, Alabama at Bayfest. He performed two concerts the following week, including a benefit concert for the victims of Hurricane Katrina, but was back in the hospital the next day with surgery complications. In November Bice was named "Heartland Hero of the Week" on John Kasich's show, Heartland, for giving up his house to the family displaced by Hurricane Katrina and for using his music to raise money for victims of Hurricane Katrina. Jim Croce's family awarded Bice the "Jim Croce 20th Annual Music Award" because the Croce family had been greatly moved by Bice's performance of Croce's song "Time in a Bottle" while he was a contestant on American Idol.

=== The Real Thing and recurring medical problems: 2005–2006 ===
Bice's solo debut album, The Real Thing, was released on December 13, 2005. It opened at number four. The Real Thing has the seventh-highest opening for a debut album by an American Idol finalist. Bice's band at the time appears with him on three tracks on The Real Thing's DualDisc version. In January 2006, CMT aired an hour-long TV special—called Bo Bice: In the Moment—which chronicled Bice's life post-Idol during the recording of his album, The Real Thing. Their cameras had followed Bice around for months during the making of his album. The film showed both his joy with making an album and his frustration with recording other people's pop songs. The cameras also captured the birth of his son, Aidan. On December 18, Bice started coughing up blood while rehearsing for a performance on the 2005 Radio Music Awards, and had to miss the show.

In February 2006, Bice kicked off a radio promo tour. During the ensuing year of promotional appearances and touring, Bice continued to suffer with the recurring intestinal condition which had not been repaired by the August 2005 surgery. In the span of just a few months during his various tours, Bice was hospitalized 20 times, checking out of the hospitals each time to honor his performance commitments. In March 2006, Bice sang on the American Idol Top 16 Results Show. In April 2006, Bice was one of the celebrity drivers featured in the Toyota Pro/Celebrity Race held in Long Beach, California, that was sponsored by Toyota to benefit various children's hospitals of Southern California. On September 12, 2006, Bice released a cover of The Chambers Brothers 1968 smash hit, "Time Has Come Today", which was the theme song for a new Monopoly commercial. In September 2006, Bice was a special guest star in a TV special called Decades Rock Live: Lynyrd Skynyrd & Friends—the friends being Bice, Hank Williams Jr., and 3 Doors Down.

On October 5, 2006, Bice underwent emergency surgery in Nashville, Tennessee to correct his recurring intestinal problem. The surgery came after several rounds of tests and doctors deemed his condition serious enough to operate immediately. The day after that surgery, a complication occurred and Bice had to undergo another surgery. During the subsequent recovery time, Ben Stiller invited Bice to record for the Will Ferrell film Blades of Glory produced by Stiller. Bice made several promotional appearances in connection with the releases. Bice was presented with a gold record for The Real Thing not long after RCA dropped Bice from its roster.

=== Sugar Money Records, See The Light and 3: 2007–2013 ===
In the spring and summer of 2006, Bice began to talk of his hopes for a second CD, saying that "[he]'d like to go more rootsy, more country, more southern rock Bo." Bice encouraged his fans to start a petition asking Clive Davis for Bice's original southern rock songs on a subsequent CD. The Grassroots Coalition to Hear More Bo started the online Petition to Hear More Bo, which collected over 5,300 signatures before it was closed February 21, 2007, after word broke that Bice was no longer with RCA. Bice subsequently formed his own record label called Sugar Money/StratArt (in partnership with Strategic Artist Management). He spent the next few months planning, writing, and recording music for his new album, See the Light. Bice introduced many of his newly written songs on a short acoustic tour which began in May 2007 and ended a few weeks later with his hospitalization for flu and bronchitis. See the Light was released October 23, 2007.

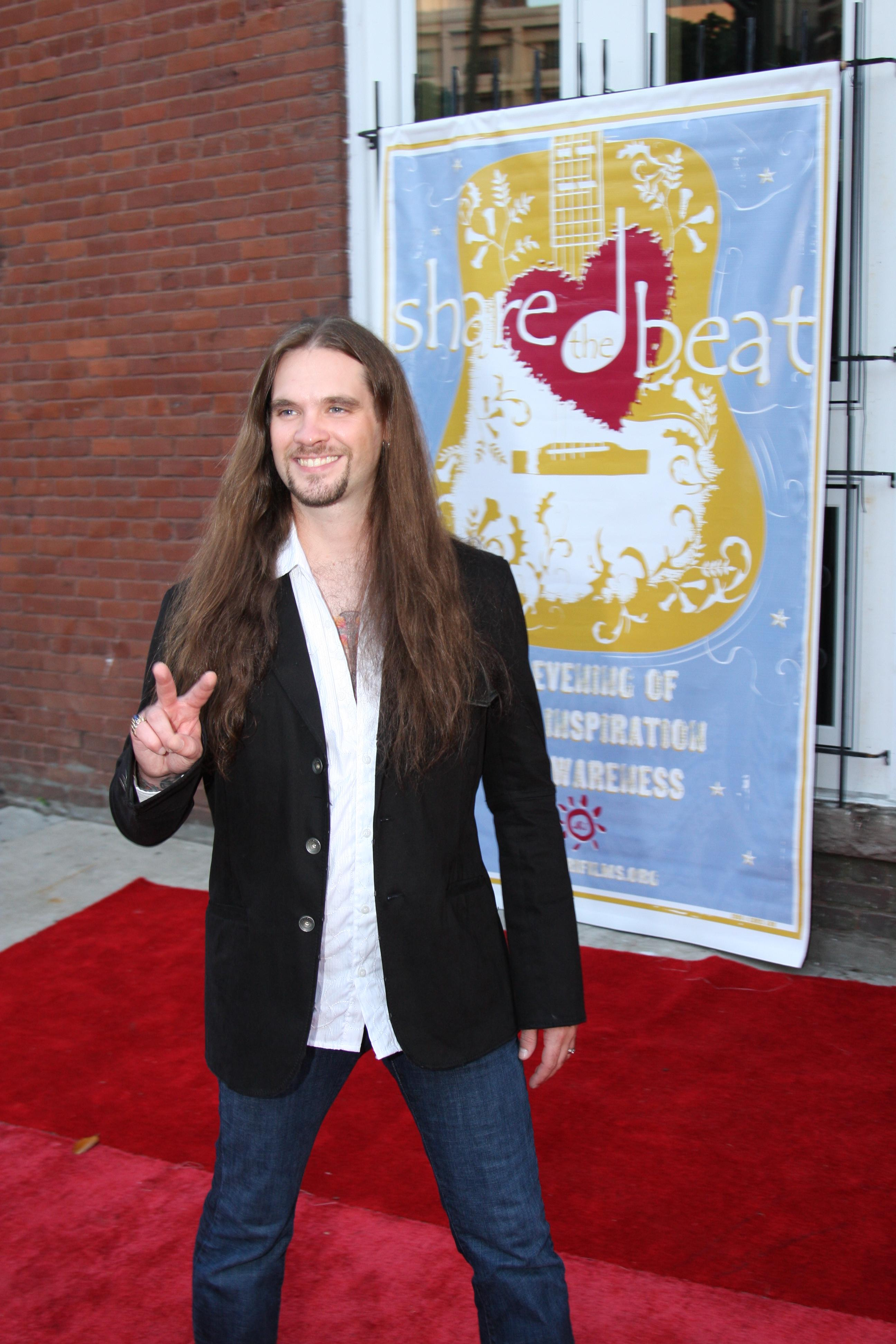
Bice in September 2008

In October 2007, Bice made an appearance on the TV show American Chopper: The Series in an episode which featured a custom-built Peavey Bike with a built-in guitar, microphone, and amp. Peavey Electronics Corporation and Bice were working together to develop a Bo Bice guitar for their line of products. Bice had made appearances in Peavey Electronics Corporation's after school programs (in conjunction with National Afterschool Alliance) during which Peavey donated instruments to schools. In February 2008, Bice traveled to Kuwait and Afghanistan to perform for U.S. troops deployed in the region, and to thank them for their service. He went back to the war region in Fall 2008. During Spring and Summer 2008, Bice continued his tour promoting his See the Light album. He simultaneously spent a few weeks participating in a special tour called It Was Forty Years Ago Today with Todd Rundgren, Denny Laine, Lou Gramm, and Christopher Cross. The tour paid tribute to the fortieth anniversary of the release of the Beatles' Sgt. Pepper’s Lonely Hearts Club Band.

On September 13, Bice participated in "Share the Beat", a benefit for the Georgia Transplant Foundation and the James Redford Institute for Transplant Awareness. Bice sang two tracks on the Brothers of the Southland CD, a compilation spearheaded by The Marshall Tucker Band's George McCorkle who had died from cancer just days prior to the recording sessions. On December 2, Bice was invited to Washington to perform for President Bush. Throughout 2009, Bice continued touring to support See the Light. Bice did tour dates with Lynyrd Skynyrd. Bice was honored with the prestigious Lifetime Presidential Volunteer Service Award for volunteering more than 4,000 hours of his time for worthy causes, such as Habitat for Humanity, Katrina assistance, muscular dystrophy, organ transplants, two concert tours for the military troops in Iraq, Kuwait, and Afghanistan, Safe House, and many others. In addition to the hours for which he received recognition, he has donated instruments, music equipment, meaningful personal memorabilia, and some of his own paintings to be auctioned off for charities.

Bice started 2010 with an acoustic tour to introduce some newly written songs that he was recording for his upcoming album. Bice's Sugar Money record label cooperated with Time Life for the album which was called 3, which was officially released on Saguaro Road Records on May 18, 2010. On October 12, 2010, Bice guest-starred on the syndicated game show Don't Forget the Lyrics! and won the $50,000 grand prize for his charity, MusiCares. Bice was the first celebrity contestant to win the grand prize by correctly singing the lyrics to all the songs in his round.

Bice is contributing vocally to a PBS documentary on the Civil War and advocates for music tours to include performances at military installations in 2011, where he performed CSA folk song "We Are a Band of Brothers".

In 2013, Bice sang "The Star-Spangled Banner" at the NASCAR Feed the Children 300 in Sparta, Kentucky.

== Discography ==
=== Studio albums ===
| Year | Album details | Peak chart positions | | | Certifications (sales threshold) |
| Year | Album details | US | US Indie | CAN | Certifications (sales threshold) |
|---|---|---|---|---|---|
| 2005 | The Real Thing: Release date: December 13, 2005; Label: RCA Records | 4 | — | 60 | US: Gold; US sales: 673,000 |
| 2007 | See the Light: Release date: October 23, 2007; Label: StratArt Records | 150 | 31 | — | US sales: 62,000 |
| 2010 | 3: Release date: May 18, 2010; Label: Saguaro Road | 154 | — | — | US sales: 11,000 |
"—" denotes releases that did not chart

=== Singles ===
| Year | Single | Peak chart positions | | | | Certifications (sales threshold) | Album |
| Year | Single | US | US AC | US Adult | US Pop | Certifications (sales threshold) | Album |
|---|---|---|---|---|---|---|---|
| 2005 | "I Don't Want to Be" | — | — | — | — | | non-album singles |
| 2005 | "Inside Your Heaven" | 2 | — | — | — | Canada: Platinum; US: Gold | non-album singles |
| 2005 | "Vehicle" | — | — | — | — | | non-album singles |
| 2006 | "The Real Thing" | 56 | 17 | 11 | 17 | | The Real Thing |
| 2006 | "U Make Me Better" | — | — | — | — | | The Real Thing |
| 2007 | "Blades of Glory" | — | — | — | — | | Blades of Glory (soundtrack) |
| 2007 | "Witness" | — | — | — | — | | See the Light |
| 2010 | "You Take Yourself with You" | — | — | — | — | | 3 |
"—" denotes releases that did not chart

=== Music videos ===
| Year | Video |
|---|---|
| 2007 | "Blades of Glory" |
| 2007 | "Witness" |
| 2010 | "You Take Yourself with You" |
