= Sick and Tired (Anastacia song) =

2004 single by Anastacia

Single by Anastacia

from the album Anastacia
- B-side: "Twisted Girl"
- Released: July 19, 2004
- Studio: O'Henry (Burbank, California); Larrabee East, Record One (Los Angeles); Record Plant (Hollywood, California)
- Genre: R&B
- Length: 3:30
- Label: Epic; Daylight
- Songwriters: Anastacia; Dallas Austin; Glen Ballard
- Producers: Dallas Austin; Glen Ballard

Anastacia singles chronology
"Left Outside Alone" (2004)	"Sick and Tired" (2004)	"Welcome to My Truth" (2004)

Music video
- "Sick and Tired" on YouTube

"Sick and Tired" is a song by American singer-songwriter Anastacia from her self-titled third album (2004). "Sick and Tired" was written by Anastacia, Dallas Austin, and Glen Ballard; as a hook line, it samples vocals sung by Sohan Lal in Punjabi from the sample library "Deepest India" (also used in "Let the Music Play" by Italian music project Shamur). The sentence repeated in the sample ("Dil La Liya Be-parvah dey naal") can be translated as "I gave my heart to someone who does not care".

"Sick and Tired" was released as the album's second single on July 19, 2004, and received positive reviews from music critics. The single reached number one in the Czech Republic and Russia, charted at number two on the European Hot 100, and peaked inside the top five in several countries, including Austria, Denmark, Germany, Italy, the Netherlands, Spain, Switzerland, and the United Kingdom. In the United States, the song was a hit on dance radio, peaking at number eight on the Billboard Dance Radio Airplay chart in March 2005.

== Critical reception and composition ==
AllMusic editor Matthew Chisling said that Anastacia "seams a bit of R&B into her melodies." Caroline Sullivan of The Guardian wrote that on "Sick and Tired" Anastacia claims: "I'm sick and tired of being sick and tired. She sounds it." Andy Gill of The Independent clarified that this song is not ironically connected to Anastacia's fight with cancer but a "complaint about a lover's 'so malign' attitude." Stylus Magazine editor Dom Passantino referenced the sampled vocal in the song, opining "she can't just throw down some random Indian guy singing as a hook and then go 'Yo, whatever he said then I'm that'... except she does." He concluded that the song is "genuinely interesting, genuinely experimental, and [a] genuinely good single".

== Music video ==
The music video for "Sick and Tired", directed by Philipp Stölzl, was shot in Los Angeles on May 25, 2004. Throughout the video, Anastacia is performing the song in a small room with the band. The video is intercut with black-and-white scenes of Anastacia as actress Sara Forest, who auditions for the role of Holly for an upcoming film, which revolves around a romantic relationship which soon turns abusive. Throughout the rehearsals, Sara forms a friendly rapport with her prospective co-stars.

== Track listings ==
UK CD1 and European CD single

1. "Sick and Tired" (album version) – 3:30
2. "Sick and Tired" (Jason Nevins Funkrock remix edit) – 3:25

UK CD2 and European maxi-CD single

1. "Sick and Tired" (album version) – 3:30
2. "Twisted Girl" – 3:56
3. "Sick and Tired" (Jason Nevins Electrochill remix) – 6:30
4. "Sick and Tired" (video) – 3:30

German mini-CD single

1. "Sick and Tired" – 3:29
2. "Twisted Girl" – 3:56

Australian CD single

1. "Sick and Tired" – 3:30
2. "Sick and Tired" (Jason Nevins Funkrock remix edit) – 3:25
3. "Sick and Tired" (Jason Nevins Electrochill remix) – 6:30
4. "Twisted Girl" – 3:56

== Credits and personnel ==
Credits are taken from the Anastacia album booklet.

Studios

- Recorded at O'Henry Studios (Burbank, California), Larrabee East, Record One (Los Angeles), and Record Plant (Hollywood, California)
- Mixed at South Beach Studios (Miami Beach, Florida)
- Mastered at Sterling Sound (New York City)

Personnel

- Anastacia – writing, vocals
- Glen Ballard – writing, keyboards, production
- Dallas Austin – writing, keyboards, MIDI drums, production
- Tony Reyes – guitars
- Colin Wolfe – bass
- Ric Wake – lead vocal production
- Rick Sheppard – recording, MIDI and sound design
- Bill Malina – recording
- Thomas R. Yezzi – recording (vocals)
- Tom Lord-Alge – mixing
- Femio Hernandez – second mix engineer
- Anthony Kilhoffer – assistant engineering
- J.D. Andrew – assistant engineering
- Tom Sweeney – assistant engineering
- Jeff Burns – assistant engineering
- Cesar Guevara – assistant engineering
- Ted Jensen – mastering

== Charts ==
=== Weekly charts ===
Chart (2004–2005)	Peak position
Australia (ARIA)	8
Austria (Ö3 Austria Top 40)	2
Belgium (Ultratop 50 Flanders)	10
Belgium (Ultratop 50 Wallonia)	22
CIS Airplay (TopHit)	3
Croatia (HRT)	8
Czech Republic (IFPI)	1
Denmark (Tracklisten)	4
Europe (Eurochart Hot 100)	2
Finland (Suomen virallinen lista)	8
Germany (GfK)	2
Greece (IFPI)	3
Hungary (Dance Top 40)	10
Hungary (Rádiós Top 40)	3
Ireland (IRMA)	9
Italy (FIMI)	3
Netherlands (Dutch Top 40)	2
Netherlands (Single Top 100)	6
New Zealand (Recorded Music NZ)	34
Norway (VG-lista)	3
Poland (PiF PaF)	3
Romania (Romanian Top 100)	15
Russia Airplay (TopHit)	1
Scottish Singles Sales (Official Charts)	3
Spain (Promusicae)	3
Sweden (Sverigetopplistan)	10
Switzerland (Schweizer Hitparade)	2
UK Singles (Official Charts)	4
Ukraine Airplay (TopHit)	15
US Dance Radio Airplay (Billboard)	8

=== Year-end charts ===
Chart (2004)	Position
Australia (ARIA)	51
Austria (Ö3 Austria Top 40)	14
Belgium (Ultratop 50 Flanders)	39
Belgium (Ultratop 50 Wallonia)	87
CIS Airplay (TopHit)	9
Germany (Media Control GfK)	13
Hungary (Rádiós Top 40)	61
Italy (FIMI)	11
Netherlands (Dutch Top 40)	6
Netherlands (Single Top 100)	44
Russia Airplay (TopHit)	3
Sweden (Hitlistan)	53
Switzerland (Schweizer Hitparade)	16
UK Singles (OCC)	94
Ukraine Airplay (TopHit)	200

Chart (2005)	Position
Hungary (Rádiós Top 40)	24
Romania (Romanian Top 100)	44

== Certifications ==
Region	Certification	Certified units/sales
Australia (ARIA)	Gold	35,000^{^}
Germany (BVMI)	Gold	150,000^{^}
Norway (IFPI Norway)	Gold	5,000^{*}
United Kingdom (BPI)	Silver	200,000^{‡}
^{*} Sales figures based on certification alone.^{^} Shipments figures based on certification alone.^{‡} Sales+streaming figures based on certification alone.

== Release history ==
Region	Date	Format(s)	Label(s)	Ref(s).
Australia	July 19, 2004	CD	Epic; Daylight	
United Kingdom	August 2, 2004	CD	Epic; Daylight	
Denmark	September 13, 2004	CD	Epic; Daylight	
