= Heavy on My Heart =

2005 single by Anastacia

Single by Anastacia

from the album Anastacia
- B-side: "Underground Army"; "Trop lourd dans mon coeur"
- Released: March 7, 2005
- Studio: Record Plant (Hollywood, California); Record One, Larrabee East (Los Angeles)
- Length: 4:25
- Label: Epic; Daylight
- Songwriters: Anastacia; Billy Mann
- Producer: Glen Ballard

Anastacia singles chronology
"Welcome to My Truth" (2004)	"Heavy on My Heart" (2005)	"Everything Burns" (2005)

Music video
- "Heavy on My Heart" on YouTube

"Heavy on My Heart" is a song by American recording artist Anastacia from her self-titled third album (2004). Written by Anastacia and Billy Mann, its arrangement is built on simple guitar riffs, and its lyrics chronicle Anastacia's battle with breast cancer. The song was released as the album's fourth and final single on March 7, 2005, and entered the top 20 in Hungary, Italy, the Netherlands, and Spain. A French version of the song, titled "Trop lourd dans mon coeur" (meaning "Too Heavy on My Heart"), appears as a B-side to the single.

== Critical reception ==
AllMusic editor Matthew Chisling described this song: "a shimmering ballad flushed by pain, love, and bombastic sounds that collide like tidal waves in what can only be described as a magical four minutes." Yahoo! Music editor Dann Genoe wrote: "Power ballad "Heavy On My Heart" is prime for a soft focus video."

== Music video ==
The music video was directed by Ronald Vietz and filmed in Bucharest, Romania. It was inspired by Hans Christian Andersen's fairy tale "The Steadfast Tin Soldier".

In the video, Anastacia is shown as a mannequin, which falls in love with another mannequin. At the chorus she breaks the window and runs to the male mannequin. They dance in the snow and fall in love. The two then run into a room and make out. Later, the shop in which they are displayed goes out of business. All of the shop's materials are thrown away and sent to some sort of factory where a fire burns. They end up being melted in a fire and while holding hands and kissing, their shapes are contorted into the image of a heart. The video also shows Anastacia singing in a dark green room. She is dressed in all black which conceals all of her but her head and hands.

== Track listings ==
UK and Australian CD single

1. "Heavy on My Heart" – 4:27
2. "Underground Army" – 4:15
3. "Trop lourd dans mon coeur" – 4:27
4. "Special Thanks (Spoken Word)" – 1:30
5. "Heavy on My Heart" (video) – 4:27

European CD single

1. "Heavy on My Heart" – 4:27
2. "Underground Army" – 4:15

== Credits and personnel ==
Credits are taken from the Anastacia album booklet.

Studios

- Recorded at Record Plant (Hollywood, California), Record One, and Larrabee East (Los Angeles)
- Vocals recorded at Henson Studios (Los Angeles)
- Mixed at Image Studios (Los Angeles)
- Mastered at Sterling Sound (New York City)

Personnel

- Anastacia – writing, vocals, background vocals
- Billy Mann – writing, background vocals, production (vocals)
- Michael Landau – guitars
- Tim Pierce – guitars
- Lance Morrison – bass
- Glen Ballard – keyboards, production
- Randy Kerber – keyboards
- Matt Laug – drums
- Bill Malina – recording
- Mike Fennel – recording (vocals)
- Chris Lord-Alge – mixing
- Keith Armstrong – assistant mix engineering
- Anthony Kilhoffer – assistant engineering
- J.D. Andrew – assistant engineering
- Tom Sweeney – assistant engineering
- Jeff Burns – assistant engineering
- Ted Jensen – mastering

== Charts ==
=== Weekly charts ===
Chart (2005)	Peak position
Australia (ARIA)	55
Austria (Ö3 Austria Top 40)	29
Belgium (Ultratip Bubbling Under Flanders)	2
Belgium (Ultratip Bubbling Under Wallonia)	5
European Hot 100 Singles (Billboard)	40
Germany (GfK)	29
Hungary (Single Top 40)	7
Ireland (IRMA)	32
Italy (FIMI)	12
Netherlands (Dutch Top 40)	16
Netherlands (Single Top 100)	24
Scotland Singles (OCC)	16
Spain (Promusicae)	8
Switzerland (Schweizer Hitparade)	35
UK Singles (OCC)	21
Ukraine Airplay (TopHit)	87

=== Year-end charts ===
Chart (2005)	Position
Netherlands (Dutch Top 40)	153

== Release history ==
Region	Date	Format(s)	Label(s)	Ref.
Europe	March 7, 2005	Digital download	Epic; Daylight	
Australia	March 28, 2005	CD	Epic; Daylight	
United Kingdom	April 11, 2005	CD	Epic; Daylight	
