= Left Outside Alone =

2004 single by Anastacia

Single by Anastacia

from the album Anastacia
- B-side: "Get Ready"
- Released: March 15, 2004
- Studio: O'Henry (Burbank, California); Record One (Los Angeles); Record Plant (Hollywood, California)
- Genre: Pop rock
- Length: 4:17 (album version); 3:40 (radio edit)
- Label: Epic; Daylight
- Songwriters: Anastacia; Glen Ballard; Dallas Austin
- Producers: Dallas Austin; Glen Ballard

Anastacia singles chronology
"Love Is a Crime" (2003)	"Left Outside Alone" (2004)	"Sick and Tired" (2004)

Audio sample
- Left Outside Alone: file; help

Music videos
- "Left Outside Alone" on YouTube; "Left Outside Alone" (US version) on YouTube

"Left Outside Alone" is a song by American recording artist Anastacia from her self-titled third album. Written by Anastacia, Dallas Austin, and Glen Ballard, the song details the singer's strained relationship with her estranged father. It was released as the album's lead single on March 15, 2004. The track received universal acclaim, with praise coming from Anastacia's new musical sound as well as her new singing sound found in the opening of the song being compared to Evanescence's Amy Lee.

"Left Outside Alone" topped the charts of several countries, including Australia, Austria, the Czech Republic, Italy, Spain, and Switzerland. It entered the top 10 in an additional 13 countries, becoming the sixth-biggest-selling European single of 2004. In the United Kingdom, it peaked at number three to give Anastacia her highest-charting hit there. In the United States, the Jason Nevins remix of "Left Outside Alone" was successful on the Billboard dance charts, reaching number one on the Dance Singles Sales chart and number five on the Dance Club Play chart.

== Critical reception ==
"Left Outside Alone" received universal acclaim from critics. AllMusic editor Matthew Chisling wrote "Stronger tracks on the album include "Left Outside Alone,"..., on which Anastacia berates the listener with cries of frustration in pop/rock at its finest." Caroline Sullivan of The Guardian wrote "Apparent references pop up: "It's not OK, I don't feel safe," runs the chorus to Left Outside Alone." The Independent editor Andy Gill said that this song is "the source of the vulnerability."

Dom Passantino of Stylus Magazine wrote "Left Outside Alone" starts off as if we're being sang to by the Holy Ghost (assuming Kate Bush is the Father and Tori Amos is the Son), over, yes, exactly the same chords that oversaw "Daredevil"... Then Anastacia switches style back to her normal voice… calling it normal seems a fallacy." He later praised the song with these words "genuinely interesting, genuinely experimental, and genuinely good single." Yahoo! Music editor Dann Ginoe praised the song: "With a high-pitched gothic quiver floating atop ambient brooding, "Left Outside Alone"'s opening strains could easily have her mistaken for Evanescence's Amy Lee. The familiar air-raid siren wail does kick in eventually, but it's bellowing to an uncharacteristically snarly, guitar-churning chorus. Yup, that's right, Anastacia's gone rock."

== Music videos ==
Shot in Burbank, California in February 2004, the regular music video for "Left Outside Alone" directed by Bryan Barber. There are actually three music videos for the song. The regular (and first) version was released to the worldwide market, excluding North America.

The regular version begins with Anastacia on a bridge. Later she is walking along a street with a red poster on an advertising pillar. The street is of European style with European cars (a Fiat 500 with a vehicle registration plates of France, a Smart Roadster, and a Citroën DS). Then she gets in a car, and whilst driving, she looks into a car next to her and sees "herself" canoodling passionately with a man. When she gets out of the car she notices people dancing to her song on the street.

The alternate version of this video, known as the "blue-poster version", was made for the Jason Nevins Global Club Edit of the song, contains different edits, including the usage of a blue poster instead of the red one, and it also has a different ending.

In 2005, a completely new video was released for American audiences. Shot on May 19–20, 2005, this version was directed by David Lippman and Charles Mehling, and was shot in Los Angeles, California. Although this version was recorded specially for the American market, "Left Outside Alone" was never officially released there. In this version, Anastacia is in a castle lying alone in a bed surrounded by candles.

== Part 2 ==
A different version of the track (entitled "Left Outside Alone, Part 2") appears on the deluxe edition of Anastacia's sixth studio album Resurrection. This version features an alternative melody for the same lyrics heard in the original song. She was quoted as saying: "Ten years later, I'm putting out an album and I wanted to revisit that song. I gave myself an opportunity to do that. I loved it and it's a completely different perspective on the song."

== Track listings ==
US 12-inch single

A1. "Left Outside Alone" (Jason Nevins Global Club) – 8:05
A2. "Left Outside Alone" (radio edit) – 3:55
B1. "Left Outside Alone" (Jason Nevins Global Club Edit) – 4:16
B2. "Left Outside Alone" (album version) – 4:17

US maxi-CD single

1. "Left Outside Alone" (radio edit) – 3:55
2. "Get Ready" – 3:30
3. "Left Outside Alone" (Jason Nevins Global Club Edit) – 4:16
4. "Left Outside Alone" (Jason Nevins Global Club) – 8:05
5. "Left Outside Alone" (Jason Nevins Mix Show) – 5:35

UK and European CD single

1. "Left Outside Alone" (radio edit) – 3:40
2. "Get Ready" – 3:30

European maxi-CD single

1. "Left Outside Alone" (radio edit) – 3:40
2. "Get Ready" – 3:30
3. "Left Outside Alone" (Jason Nevins Global Club Edit) – 8:05
4. "Left Outside Alone" (Jason Nevins Mix Show Edit) – 3:14
5. "Left Outside Alone" (M*A*S*H Rock Mix) – 4:04

German mini-CD single

1. "Left Outside Alone" – 3:40
2. "Left Outside Alone" (Jason Nevins Global Club Edit) – 4:16

Australian CD single

1. "Left Outside Alone" (radio edit) – 3:40
2. "Get Ready" – 3:30
3. "Left Outside Alone" (Jason Nevins Global Club Edit) – 4:16

== Credits and personnel ==
Credits are taken from the Anastacia album booklet.

Studios

- Recorded at O'Henry Studios (Burbank, California), Record One (Los Angeles), and Record Plant (Hollywood, California)
- Mixed at South Beach Studios (Miami Beach, Florida)
- Mastered at Sterling Sound (New York City)

Personnel

- Anastacia – writing, vocals, background vocals
- Glen Ballard – writing, keyboards, production
- Dallas Austin – writing, guitars, keyboards, MIDI drums, production
- Siedah Garrett – background vocals
- Lisa Vaughn – background vocals
- Audrey Wheeler – background vocals
- Tim Pierce – guitars
- Tony Reyes – guitars
- Colin Wolfe – bass
- Sean Hurley – bass
- Josh Freese – drums
- Ric Wake – lead vocal production
- William Malina – recording
- Rick Sheppard – recording, MIDI and sound design
- Thomas R. Yezzi – recording (vocals)
- Tom Lord-Alge – mixing
- Femio Hernandez – second mix engineer
- Cesar Guevara – assistant engineering
- Ted Jensen – mastering

== Charts ==
=== Weekly charts ===
Chart (2004–2005)	Peak position
Australia (ARIA)	1
Austria (Ö3 Austria Top 40)	1
Belgium (Ultratop 50 Flanders)	5
Belgium (Ultratop 50 Wallonia)	7
CIS Airplay (TopHit)	42
Croatia International Airplay (HRT)	1
Czech Republic (IFPI)	1
Denmark (Tracklisten)	2
Europe (European Hot 100 Singles)	2
Finland (Suomen virallinen lista)	6
France (SNEP)	9
Germany (GfK)	2
Greece (IFPI)	7
Hungary (Rádiós Top 40)	3
Ireland (IRMA)	2
Italy (FIMI)	1
Netherlands (Dutch Top 40)	2
Netherlands (Single Top 100)	2
New Zealand (Recorded Music NZ)	20
Norway (VG-lista)	2
Romania (Romanian Top 100)	10
Russia Airplay (TopHit)	43
Scottish Singles Sales (Official Charts)	1
Spain (Promusicae)	1
Sweden (Sverigetopplistan)	6
Switzerland (Schweizer Hitparade)	1
UK Singles (Official Charts)	3
Ukraine Airplay (TopHit)	154
US Adult Top 40 (Billboard)	30
US Dance Club Play (Billboard) Jason Nevins remix	5
US Dance Radio Airplay (Billboard)	22
US Dance Singles Sales (Billboard) Jason Nevins remix	1

Chart (2012)	Peak position
Ukraine Airplay (TopHit)	127

Chart (2025–2026)	Peak position
Finland Airplay (Radiosoittolista)	13
Moldova Airplay (TopHit)	75
Poland (Polish Airplay Top 100)	55

=== Year-end charts ===
Chart (2004)	Position
Australia (ARIA)	2
Austria (Ö3 Austria Top 40)	10
Belgium (Ultratop 50 Flanders)	15
Belgium (Ultratop 50 Wallonia)	31
Croatia International Airplay (HRT)	3
Europe (European Hot 100 Singles)	6
France (SNEP)	56
Germany (Media Control GfK)	17
Hungary (Rádiós Top 40)	25
Ireland (IRMA)	5
Italy (FIMI)	4
Netherlands (Dutch Top 40)	9
Netherlands (Single Top 100)	19
Sweden (Hitlistan)	19
Switzerland (Schweizer Hitparade)	8
UK Singles (OCC)	7
US Dance Singles Sales (Billboard)	9

Chart (2005)	Position
Hungary (Rádiós Top 40)	32
US Adult Top 40 (Billboard)	99
US Dance Singles Sales (Billboard)	18

=== Decade-end charts ===
Chart (2000–2009)	Position
Australia (ARIA)	41

== Certifications ==
Region	Certification	Certified units/sales
Australia (ARIA)	2× Platinum	140,000^{^}
Austria (IFPI Austria)	Gold	15,000^{*}
Belgium (BRMA)	Gold	25,000^{*}
Germany (BVMI)	Gold	150,000^{^}
New Zealand (RMNZ)	Gold	15,000^{‡}
Norway (IFPI Norway)	Gold	5,000^{*}
Spain (Promusicae)	Gold	30,000^{‡}
Switzerland (IFPI Switzerland)	Gold	20,000^{^}
United Kingdom (BPI)	Platinum	600,000^{‡}
^{*} Sales figures based on certification alone.^{^} Shipments figures based on certification alone.^{‡} Sales+streaming figures based on certification alone.

== Release history ==
Region	Date	Format(s)	Label(s)	Ref(s).
Australia	March 15, 2004	CD	Epic; Daylight	
Europe	March 15, 2004	CD	Epic; Daylight	
United Kingdom	March 22, 2004	CD	Epic; Daylight	
North America	April 6, 2004	CD	Epic; Daylight	
United States	April 19, 2004	Contemporary hit; hot AC radio	Epic; Daylight	

== Cover versions ==
In 2020, Finnish nu metal band Blind Channel recorded a cover version of the song. Blind Channel released a short clip of Anastacia and the band singing "Left Outside Alone" on Instagram in June 2023.

British metal band Malevolence recorded a cover as part of The Aggression Sessions split EP released on April 7, 2023.
