= Per amarti =

Studio album by Mia Martini
- Released: 1977
- Genre: Pop
- Length: 41:04
- Language: Italian
- Label: Come Il Vento; RCA
- Producer: Antonio Coggio

Mia Martini chronology
Che vuoi che sia... se t'ho aspettato tanto (1976)	Per amarti (1977)	Danza (1978)

Singles from Per amarti
- 1. "Per amarti" Released: 1977

Per amarti is the eighth studio album by Italian singer Mia Martini, released in 1977 by Come Il Vento and distributed by RCA Italiana.

== Overview ==
The record marks the beginning of a collaboration between Mia Martini and Ivano Fossati, who wrote the songs "Sentimento" and "Se finisce qui". The title track and the lead single "Per amarti" were written by Bruno Lauzi and Maurizio Fabrizio. Martini herself is the author of the Italian lyrics of "Somebody to Love" by Queen, recorded under the title "Un uomo per me". The song "Da capo", written by Riccardo Cocciante, was recorded by Mina for the album Mina con bignè in the same year. The album also contains "Ritratto di donna," the track with which Martini wins the World Popular Song Festival in Tokyo and the European Critics' Award in Palma de Mallorca.

== Track listing ==
1. "Se finisse qui (Give a Little Bit)" (Ivano Fossati, Rick Davies, Roger Hodgson) – 4:20
2. "Da capo" (Marco Luberti, Riccardo Cocciante) – 4:16
3. "Sentimento" (Ivano Fossati) – 3:48
4. "Se ti voglio (When I Need You)" (Cristiano Minellono, Carole Bayer Sager, Albert Hammond) – 4:00
5. "Un uomo per me (Somebody to Love)" (Mia Martini, Freddie Mercury) – 4:25
6. "Per amarti" (Bruno Lauzi, Maurizio Fabrizio) – 5:21
7. "Innamorata di me" (Bruno Lauzi, Maurizio Fabrizio) – 3:25
8. "Shadow Dance" (Hiliry Harvey, Jimmy Fontana) – 4:10
9. "Ritratto di donna" (Carla Vistarini, Massimo Cantini, Luigi Lopez) – 4:09
10. "Canto malinconico" (Bruno Lauzi, Maurizio Fabrizio) – 3:14

== Personnel ==
- Mia Martini – vocals
- Maurizio Fabrizio – arrangement, guitar, keyboards
- Ruggero Cini – arrangement (1–3), keyboards
- Ivano Fossati – arrangement (3)
- Aida Cooper – backing vocals
- Gigi Cappellotto – bass
- Mario Scotti – bass
- Massimo Buzzi – drums
- Andy Surdi – drums, backing vocals
- Tullio De Piscopo – drums
- Sergio Farina (musitian) – guitar
- Massimo Luca – guitar
- Luciano Ciccaglioni – guitar
- Ernesto Massimo Verardi – guitar
- Alessandro Centofanti – keyboards
- Antonio Coggio – keyboards, production
- Oscar Rocchi – keyboards
- Giuseppe Bernardini – recording, mixing
- Tony Rampotti – recording, mixing
- Gianni Oddi – sax
- Luciano Tallarini – art direction
- Mauro Balletti – photography

Credits are adapted from the album's liner notes.
