= DDD – La Drogueria di Drugolo =

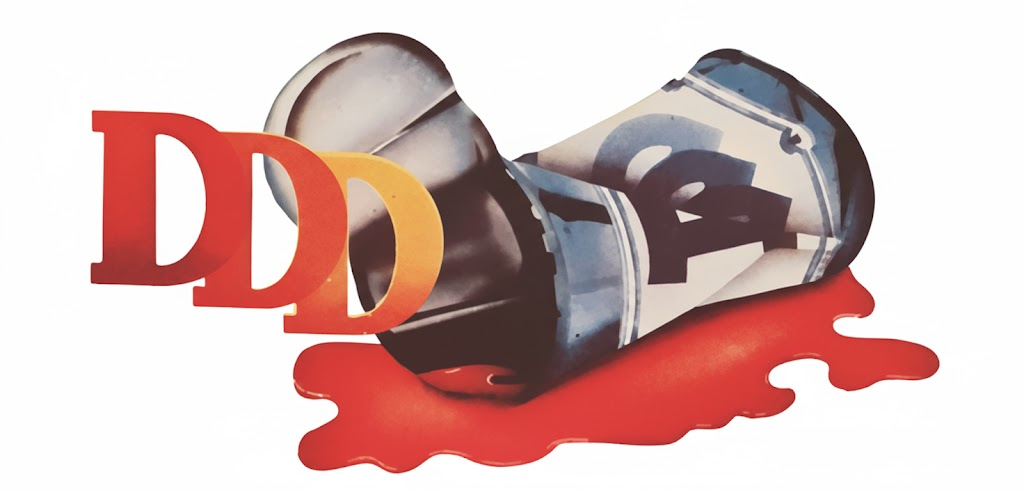
- Founded: 1979
- Founder: Roberto Galanti, Lando Lanni della Quara
- Defunct: 1992
- Distributors: Self-distributed (1979–1989), BMG (1989–1998)
- Genre: pop, rock, instrumental, orchestral
- Country of origin: Italy
- Location: Lonato del Garda

DDD – La Drogueria di Drugolo was an Italian record company, active from the 1970s to the 1990s.

== History ==
The label was founded in 1979 by record producer Roberto Galanti and Baron Lando Lanni della Quara, a nobleman residing in the Castle of Drugolo (Lonato del Garda), from which he managed the family herbal business, from which the label's name derives, a drugstore ("drogheria" in Italian).

It signed several prominent Italian singer-songwriters, including Enzo Jannacci, Fausto Leali, Enzo Gragnaniello, and Paolo Scheriani, as well as artists such as Mia Martini, Fiorella Mannoia, and bands such as Le Orme and Gian Piero Reverberi with Rondò Veneziano. But the artist with whom it is most often identified is Eros Ramazzotti, who was launched by this label.

Until 1983, the label was distributed by RCA Italiana, but due to the latter's sale to the BMG – Bertelsmann Music Group, distribution was temporarily handed over to CBS, which held it until 1989. In 1989, Baron Lanni della Quara resigned as sole director and sold 50% of his shares to BMG, which, for a few years, continued to operate the label until it completed its acquisition and integrated its catalog into its own.

== Records ==
The dating reported here is based on the record label or cover; if neither of these elements is dated, it is based on the catalog numbering; sometimes, finally, it is based on the printing matrix code. If existing, the year, month, and day are shown (the latter is sometimes printed on the vinyl).

=== Long playing ===
Catalogue	Year	Artist	Title
ZPLDR 34095	1980	Garey Mielke	Man of the sound
ZPLDR 34111	1980	Riccardo Zappa	Trasparenze
ZPLDR 34130	1981	Tirelli	Amore mandarino
ZPLDR 34139	1981	Mia Martini	Mimì
ZPLDR 34145	1982	Le Orme	Venerdì
ZPLDR 34148	1982	Riccardo Zappa	Haermea (La camera incantata)
25108	1982	Mia Martini	Quante volte… ho contato le stelle
25408	1983	Donaldo "Donato" Ciresi	Lettera notturna
25409	1983	Marivana Viscuso	Marivana
25418	1983	Francis Lai	Inedits
25457	1983	Riccardo Zappa	Riccardo Zappa
25613	1983	Mia Martini	Miei compagni di viaggio
25738	1983	Enzo Gragnaniello	Enzo Gragnaniello
25858	1984	Various	Made to Dance
26002	1984	Raffaele Mazzei	Il nibbio
26304	1984	Mia Martini	Il meglio di Mia Martini
26305	1984	Riccardo Zappa	Raccolta
54611	1984	Carrara	Shine on dance
26353	1985	Eros Ramazzotti	Cuori agitati
26442	1985	Riccardo Zappa	Minuti
26443	1985	Paolo Scheriani	Distanze
26459	1985	Enzo Jannacci	L'importante
26543	1985	Carrara	My melody
26719	1985	Various	Superstars
26722	1985	Enzo Gragnaniello	Salita Trinità degli Spagnoli
26798	1985	Carrara	Carrara Gold
26810	1985	Various	B-Side compilation
EMB 21127	1985	Fausto Leali	Canzoni d'amore
26979	1986	Eros Ramazzotti	Nuovi eroi
28555	1986	Cherry	Take a moment/Love destination
450363	1986	Riccardo Zappa	Prenditi tempo…
450395	1986	Carlo Siliotto	Mino
450867 1	1987	Enzo Jannacci	Parlare con i limoni
450867 2	1987	Enzo Jannacci	Parlare con i limoni (with bonus tracks)
451149	1987	Maurizio Marsico	Mefisto Funk
460445	1987	Eros Ramazzotti	In certi momenti
460801	1988	Fiorella Mannoia	Canzoni per parlare
461090	1988	Jo Squillo	Terra magica
461181	1988	Eros Ramazzotti	Musica è
463075	1988	Mimmo Cavallo	Non voglio essere uno spirito
463254	1988	Ciao Fellini	'70 mi dà tanto
463353	1989	Giorgio Faletti	Colletti bianchi
465060	1989	Meccano	Le ragazze come me
465140	1989	Lijao	Musica di strada
74441	1989	Walter Lupi	Bhakta Priya
465171–74498	1989	Enzo Jannacci	Se me lo dicevi prima e altri successi
466056–74499	1989	Enzo Jannacci	30 anni senza andare fuori tempo
465359	1989	Vincenzo Spampinato	Dolce amnesia dell'elefante
209 993	1989	Mimmo Cavallo	Non voglio essere uno spirito
21-0654 / 26–0654	1990	Eros Ramazzotti	In ogni senso
21-1167 / 26–1167	1990	Rino Zurzolo	Fuorlovado
21-1184 / 26–1184	1990	Massimo Gatti	Frangenti
21-1185 / 26–1185	1990	Giusto Pio	Utopie
21-1186 / 26–1186	1990	Antonio Calogero	Caleidoscopio
21-1205 / 26–1205	1990	Vincenzo Spampinato	Antico suono degli dei
74444	1990	Franco Morone	Stranalandia
74496	1990	Licia Consoli –Giuseppe Leopizzi	Nierika
74497	1990	Riccardo Zappa	Anthakarana Swami
ZD 74500	1990	Eros Ramazzotti	Cuori agitati
ZD 74501	1990	Eros Ramazzotti	Nuovi eroi
ZD 74502	1990	Eros Ramazzotti	In certi momenti
ZD 74503	1990	Eros Ramazzotti	Musica è
21-1543 / 26–1543	1991	Matia Bazar	Anime pigre
21-1737 / 26–1737	1991	Enzo Jannacci	Guarda la fotografia
21-1738 / 26–1738	1992	Fattorini	Fattorini
21-1764 / 26–1764	1991	Celeste Johnson	The Swing of Love
21-2035 / 26–2035	1991	Riccardo Zappa	Santo & Zappa
21-2353 / 26–2353	1991	Gigi Cifarelli	Kitchen Blues
21-2354 / 26–2354	1991	Luigi Bonafede	Another Side of Me
21-2355 / 26–2355	1991	Giancarlo Locatelli Quintet	Trochus
21-2356 / 26–2356	1991	Nightflight	That's it
30–4330 / 35–4330	1991	Eros Ramazzotti	Eros in Concert
26-2867	1992	Various	Strumento (series)
21-2868 / 26–2868	1992	Roberto Mazzanti	Cloud
21-2869 / 26–2869	1992	Alessandro Ravi	L'offerta dell'acqua
21-2870 / 26–2870	1992	Franco Azzarelli –Aldo Navazio	Itaberà
21-2893 / 26–2893	1992	Mimmo Cavallo	L'incantautore
74321 10037 1	1992	Stefano Bozzetti	Tutto questo è
74321 11867 2	1992	Attilio Zanchi	Some Other Place
74321 11868 2	1992	Amato Jazz Trio	Came the Maiden Bright
74321 11869 2	1992	Dario Faiella Quintet	Via Venini
74321 11870 2	1992	Alberto Borsari	251
74321 11871 2	1992	Aldo Mella e Andrea Allione Quartet	Enklisis
74321 11991	1992	Rondò Veneziano	G. P. Reverberi – Rondò Veneziano
74321 12267 1	1992	Vincenzo Spampinato	L'amore nuovo
74321 12349 2	1993	Riccardo Zappa	Fondali
74321 12352 2	1993	Licia Consoli – Giuseppe Leopizzi	Lighea
74321 13560 2	1993	Matia Bazar	Dove le canzoni si avverano
74321 13562 2	1993	Antonella Bucci	Il mare delle nuvole
74321 14329	1993	Eros Ramazzotti	Tutte storie
74321 16356	1993	Fabio Treves	Jumpin'
74321 16357 1	1993	Giulio Visibelli	Words
74321 18413 2	1993	Progetto Cavani	Alza la testa
74321 18414 2	1993	Piero Chiappano	La via del sale
74321 18905 2	1994	Vincenzo Zitello	La via
74321 18906 2	1994	Carlo Marrale	Tra le dita la vita
74321 19259 2	1994	Enzo Jannacci	I soliti accordi
74321 20419 2	1994	Metrica	Fuorimetrica
74321 20420 2	1994	Various	Tuttigusti
74321 20421 2	1994	Eros Ramazzotti	Todo Historias
74321 21342 2	1994	Riccardo Zappa	Dal vivo
74321 21775 2	1994	Rondò Veneziano	Il mago di Venezia
74321 30139 2	1995	Rondò Veneziano	Sinfonia di Natale
74321 35441 2	1996	Eros Ramazzotti	Dove c'è musica
74321 53293 2	1997	Eros Ramazzotti	Eros
74321 62378 2	1998	Eros Ramazzotti	Eros Live

=== 7" ===
Catalogue	Year	Artist	Title
ZBDR 7189	1980	Martina	Disco 'Round the World/Touch me
ZBDR 7190	1980	Gene Colonnello	A fil di logica/Io non-ho che te
ZBDR 7208	1981	Mia Martini	Ti regalo un sorriso/Ancora grande
ZBDR 7209	1981	Tirelli	Dimmi per chi/Shillà
ZBDR 7236	1981	Mia Martini	E ancora canto/Stai con me
ZBDR 7239	1981	Tirelli	Addio Milano/Dimmi per chi
ZBDR 7245	1982	Tirelli	Io senza te/Musica che rapisce
ZBDR 7246	1982	Le Orme	Marinai/La notte
ZBDR 7250	1982	Mia Martini	E non-finisce mica il cielo/Voglio te
ZBDR 7264	1982	Fausto Leali	Gente comune/Vado col vento
ZBDR 7268	1982	Pierre Bachelet	Di un altro mondo/Ma io penso a te
ZBDR 7269	1982	Made in Italy	La piscina/Io & te
ZBDR 7278	1982	Eros Ramazzotti	Ad un amico/Sole che viene
JC 15081	1982	Le Orme/Mia Martini	Rosso di sera/Guarirò guarirò
A 2819	1982	Mia Martini	Quante volte/Solo noi
A 2820	1982	Le Orme	Rosso di sera/Sahara
A 3150	1983	Daniela Goggi	Dammi tanto amore/Insieme a te
A 3293	1983	Donaldo "Donato" Ciresi	Lettera notturna/Sara
A 3294	1983	Marivana	Ninnia/I musicisti (però le note)
A 3328	1983	Fausto Leali	Canzone amara/Camminando
A 3383	1983	Riccardo Zappa	Cooper e la macchina parlante (Parte 1)/(Parte 2)
A 3384	1983	Olsen Brothers	Marie Marie/Feels like I'm crazy
A 3485	1983	Tony Labriola	Cocò/Bleccaut
A 3486	1983	Mia Martini	Bambolina/Guarirò guarirò
A 3807	1983	Enzo Gragnaniello	'A rota/S'je fosse nato
A 3808	1983	Jane Hill	Radio/Keepon Music
A 3809	1983	Chris Keane	(The Ballad of) Lone Ranger/Chorus girl
A 3810	1983	Marivana	Le mille bolle blu/Che sarà
A 3876	1983	Carrara	Disco King/Disco King (Strumentale)
A 4126	1984	Eros Ramazzotti	Terra promessa/Bella storia
A 4382	1984	Daniela Goggi	È un nuovo giorno/Senza te
A 4383	1984	Christine	Dancing Hours
A 4384	1984	Carrara	Shine on Dance/Last Emotion
A 4406	1984	Raffaele Mazzei	Canzone dei desideri/Alle porte dell'inverno
A 4492	1984	Fausto Leali	Io, io senza te/Allora no
A 4553	1984	Maracas	Me gusta bailar (y cantar)
A 4788	1984	Paco D'Alcatraz	Doberman/Voglio l'oscar
A 4809	1984	Eros Ramazzotti	Buongiorno bambina/Voglio volare
A 6029	1985	Eros Ramazzotti	Una storia importante/Respiro nel blu
A 6030	1985	Mia Martini	Spaccami il cuore/Lucy
A 6146	1985	Jimmy McFoy	Hi Girl
A 6199	1985	Paolo Scheriani	Un'Italia fa/Miracolo a Milano
A 6200	1985	Meccano	Endless Refrain/Endless Refrain (Instrumental)
A 6246	1985	Carrara	Welcome to the Sunshine/My melody
A 6250	1985	Eros Ramazzotti	Cuori agitati/Quando l'amore
A 6251	1985	Enzo Jannacci	Son s'cioppàa/L'importante è esagerare
A 6299	1985	Enzo Jannacci	Mi-mi-la-la-Mi-Mi-la-lan!/La bambina lupo
A 6301	1985	Azzurra	Quanto amore/Ti voglio bene
A 6723	1985	Coin Privé	I Don't Care/Fly by Night
A 6872	1985	Marylitz	She is a Bad Girl/She is a Bad Girl (Instrumental)
A 6918	1986	Eros Ramazzotti	Adesso tu/Un nuovo amore
A 6919	1986	Aida Satta Flores	Croce del sud/Alkaid
A 7196	1986	Paolo Scheriani	La danzatrice di flamenco/Io volerei
A 7214	1986	Duo Latino	El marinero/To Be Right
A 7262	1986	Ciao Fellini	Noche a Bahia/Noche a Bahia (Instrumental)
650223-7	1986	Cherry	Take a Moment/Love's Destination
650256-7	1986	Overture	Songwriter/Burning Inside
650409-7	1987	Fiorella Mannoia	Quello che le donne non-dicono/Ti ruberò
650410-7	1987	Paolo Scheriani	L'esteta/Dagli un taglio
650881-7	1987	Kate	Carnival/The Woman and the Girl in Me
650884-7	1987	Lijao	Amore intensità/Amore intensità (Instrumental)
650885-7	1987	Etnica	Ondarabia/Ondarabia (Reverse version)
651003-7	1987	Fausto Leali	A chi/Canzone amara
651408-7	1987	Cherry	Lullaby/Cherry's Dream
651417-7	1988	Fiorella Mannoia	Le notti di maggio/Fino a fermarmi
651418-7	1988	Lijao	Per noi giovani/Esagerato amore
651686-7	1988	Mimmo Cavallo	Non voglio essere uno spirito/Lavori in corso
651687-7	1988	Meccano	Attenti a noi/Come il mare
651695-7	1988	Jo Squillo	Diavolo/Non sei l'immagine che ho di te
652821-7	1988	Ciao Fellini	La mia banda suona il rock/Rockaliente
653087-7	1988	Jo Squillo	Terra magica/Tu non-mi cucchi più
653088-7	1989	Mimmo Cavallo	Voglio un amore grande/Felice carriera
653128-7	1988	Giorgio Faletti	Tette a lampadina/Colletti bianchi
654655-7	1989	Ciao Fellini	Prisencolineninsainciusol
654702-7	1989	Meccano	Le ragazze come me/Un amore per vincere
654706-7	1989	Enzo Jannacci	Se me lo dicevi prima/Vita e bottoni
654836-7	1989	Lijao	Com'è grande la città/Io ti farei
654894-7	1989	Ciao Fellini	Four Fellini Go to Cinecittà/Madame
654939-7	1989	Tiziano Cavaliere	Con le donne/Be a Woman
654950-7	1989	C.N.N.T.	Cosa Nostra No Thanks/CNNT (Instrumental)
654972-7	1989	Finalmente Ricchi	De Niro/De Niro (Instrumental)
655335-7	1989	Lijao	L'odore della notte/Occhi nuvolosi
655433-7	1989	24H. a day	Valentina/Valentina (Dub version)
661686	1989	Mimmo Cavallo	Non voglio essere uno spirito/Voglio un futuro possibile
113087	1990	Lijao	Un cielo che si muove/Fretta di vivere
113405	1990	Ciao Fellini	Dalì/Dalì (Versione Mix)
114405	1991	Celeste Johnson	The Swing of love/Can't Get Over You
114158	1991	Enzo Jannacci	La fotografia/La fine della storia
115289	1992	Antonella Bucci	Le ragazze crescono/Il gigante

== Bibliography ==
- Gino Castaldo, Dizionario della canzone italiana, Edizioni Curcio, 1990; alla voce DDD, di Mario De Luigi, p. 488–489.
