= Il giorno dopo =

Studio album by Mia Martini
- Released: 23 May 1973
- Genre: Pop
- Length: 47:50
- Language: Italian
- Label: Dischi Ricordi
- Producer: Gianni Sanjust

Mia Martini chronology
| Nel mondo, una cosa (1972) | Il giorno dopo (1973) | È proprio come vivere (1974) |

Singles from Il giorno dopo
- 1. "Minuetto" Released: 1973

Professional ratings
Review scores
| Source | Rating |
|---|---|
| OndaRock | 7.5/10 |

Il giorno dopo is the third studio album by Italian singer Mia Martini, released on 23 May 1973 by Dischi Ricordi. Thanks to extensive advertising on television and radio, the album surpassed the success of the previous album, selling about half a million records and reaching sixth place on the Italian albums chart.

== Track listing ==
1. "Ma quale amore" (Franca Evangelisti, Antonello Venditti) – 4:00
2. "Picnic (Your Song)" (Elton John, Maurizio Piccoli) – 3:45
3. "Il guerriero" (Franco Califano, Maurizio Piccoli) – 3:38
4. "Bolero" (Maurizio Piccoli, Dario Baldan Bembo, Leonardo Ricchi) – 4:33
5. "Dimmelo tu" (Luigi Albertelli, Massimo Guantini) – 4:00
6. "Minuetto" (Franco Califano, Dario Baldan Bembo) – 4:44
7. "Mi piace" (Bruno Lauzi, Carmelo La Bionda, Michelangelo La Bionda) – 3:46
8. "La malattia" (Maurizio Piccoli) – 4:39
9. "Tu sei così" (Luigi Albertelli, Massimo Guantini) – 3:53
10. "La discoteca" (Maurizio Piccoli) – 3:07
11. "Signora" (Joan Manuel Serrat, Paolo Limiti) – 2:30
12. "Dove il cielo va a finire" (Salvatore Fabrizio, Maurizio Fabrizio) – 5:15

== Charts ==
Chart performance for Il giorno dopo
| Chart (1973) | Peak position |
|---|---|
| Italian Albums (Musica e dischi) | 5 |

== Personnel ==
- Mia Martini – vocals
- Dario Baldan Bembo – keyboards
- Furio Bozzetti – drums
- Cosimo Fabiano – bass guitar
- Maurizio Fabrizio – guitar
- Salvatore Fabrizio – bass guitar
- La Bionda – guitar
- Grimm – backing vocals
- Massimo Luca – guitar
- Leonardo Ricchi – guitar
- Andy Surdi – drums
