= Sensi e controsensi =

Studio album by Mia Martini
- Released: 1975
- Genre: Pop
- Length: 46:42
- Language: Italian
- Label: Dischi Ricordi
- Producer: Gianni Sanjust

Mia Martini chronology
| È proprio come vivere (1974) | Sensi e controsensi (1975) | Un altro giorno con me (1975) |

Singles from Sensi e controsensi
- 1. "Al mondo" Released: January 1975

Sensi e controsensi is the fifth studio album by Italian singer Mia Martini, released in 1975 through Dischi Ricordi. The album's songs were written by authors such as Luigi Albertelli, Bruno Lauzi, the La Bionda brothers and, above all, Vinicius de Moraes, who wrote "Volesse il cielo" (Italian lyrics by Sergio Bardotti), recorded live with an orchestra.

The album's release was preceded by the single "Al mondo", which reached number eighteen in the Italian charts and stayed there for fifteen weeks. At the same time, the album itself did not have much commercial success, reaching only twenty-second place in the charts, falling out after two weeks.

== Track listing ==
1. "Al mondo" (Damiano Dattoli, Luigi Albertelli) – 5:10
2. "Occhi tristi" (Aldo Menti, Bruno Lauzi) – 3:48
3. "Tutti uguali" (Bruno Tavernese, Luigi Albertelli) – 3:10
4. "Nevicate" (Natale Massara/Luigi Albertelli) – 3:20
5. "Piano pianissimo" (Damiano Dattoli, Luigi Albertelli) – 3:17
6. "Controsensi" (Maurizio Fabrizio, Luigi Albertelli) – 5:39
7. "Padrone" (Massimo Cantini, Franca Evangelisti) – 4:35
8. "Donna fatta donna" (Vito Tommaso, Antonello De Sanctis) – 3:16
9. "Principessa di turno" (Bruno Tavernese, Maurizio Piccoli) – 3:47
10. "Notturno" (Massimo Guantini, Luigi Albertelli) – 4:35
11. "Amica" (Michelangelo La Bionda, Carmelo La Bionda, Luigi Albertelli) – 3:20
12. "Sensi" (Natale Massara) – 1:10
13. "Volesse il cielo (Au que me dera)" (Vinicius de Moraes, Sergio Bardotti) – 1:35

== Charts ==
Chart performance for Sensi e controsensi
| Chart (1975) | Peak position |
|---|---|
| Italian Albums (Musica e dischi) | 22 |
