= Un altro giorno con me =

Studio album by Mia Martini
- Released: November 1975
- Genre: Pop
- Length: 46:42
- Language: Italian
- Label: Dischi Ricordi
- Producer: Gianni Sanjust

Mia Martini chronology
Sensi e controsensi (1975)	Un altro giorno con me (1975)	Che vuoi che sia... se t'ho aspettato tanto (1976)

Un altro giorno con me is the sixth studio album by Italian singer Mia Martini, released in 1975.

The album was released on the initiative of the label Dischi Ricordi, who wanted to fill the album with more commercial tracks to compensate for the failure of the previous album in the charts. Martini herself did not like the album, later she even called it the worst in her career; also due to disagreements with the label, the singer left it the following year, breaking the contract.

== Track listing ==
1. "Questi miei pensieri" (Salvatore Fabrizio, Luigi Albertelli, Maurizio Fabrizio) – 4:11
2. "Sabato" (Barry Blue, Luigi Albertelli, Maurizio Seymandi) – 3:50
3. "La porta socchiusa" (Roberto Soffici, Andrea Lo Vecchio) – 3:22
4. "La tua malizia" (Renato Brioschi, Cristiano Minellono) – 3:34
5. "Tu uomo, io donna" (Bruno Tavernese, Luigi Albertelli) – 4:12
6. "Io ti ringrazio" (Damiano Dattoli, Umberto Tozzi, Maurizio Piccoli) – 3:35
7. "Le dolci colline del viso" (Maurizio Piccoli) – 4:26
8. "Milho verde" (Gilberto Gil) – 2:54
9. "Come artisti" (Natale Massara, Maurizio Piccoli) – 3:36
10. "Malgrado ciò" (Maurizio Piccoli) – 2:58
11. "Un altro giorno con me" (Luigi Albertelli, Ernesto Verardi) – 2:52
12. "Tenero e forte" (Roberto Soffici, Luigi Albertelli) – 3:58
13. "Veni sonne di la muntagnella" (Raimondo Di Sandro) – 2:47

== Charts ==
Chart performance for Un altro giorno con me
Chart (1975)	Peak position
Italian Albums (Musica e dischi)	12
