= Minuetto (song) =

Single by Mia Martini

from the album Il giorno dopo
- B-side: "Tu sei così"
- Released: 1973
- Genre: Pop; Ballad
- Length: 4:44
- Label: Ricordi
- Composer: Dario Baldan Bembo
- Lyricist: Franco Califano
- Producers: Alberigo Crocetta; Giovanni Sanjust

Mia Martini singles chronology
"Donna sola" (1972)	"Minuetto" (1973)	"Il guerriero" (1973)

Audio
- "Minuetto" on YouTube

"Minuetto" (transl. "Minuet") is a 1973 Italian song composed by Franco Califano (lyrics) and Dario Baldan Bembo (music) and performed by Mia Martini. It was the singer's major commercial success.

== Background ==
In 1973 Dario Baldan Bembo composed a modern minuet ballad, and the melody was chosen by producer Giovanni Sanjust as to be the Summer single for Mia Martini, fresh from the success of "Piccolo uomo" and "Donna sola". He asked several songwriters to compose the lyrics, and after the versions of Luigi Albertelli, Bruno Lauzi and Maurizio Piccoli were rejected, it was eventually chosen the version of Franco Califano, who based his lyrics on some conversations he had with Martini, as to make the song more personal and biographical. The Albertelli version, titled "Salvami", was eventually released in 2003 in the collection Canzoni segrete.

The all-star chorus of the song consisted of La Bionda brothers, Bruno Lauzi, Maurizio Fabrizio, Martini's sister Loredana Bertè and her then fiancé Adriano Panatta.

The song premiered in the RAI television show Adesso musica, and eventually won the Festivalbar ex aequo with "Io domani" by Marcella Bella, marking the second victory in a row for Mia Martini. It was the major success in Martini's career, staying on the Italian single hit parade for a total of 30 weeks and reaching the second place.

The song was recorded by Mia Martini in French (with the title "Tu t'en vas quand tu veux") and Spanish and released in several foreign markets, including Japan and Brazil.

== Track listing ==
7" single – SRL 10.694
1. "Minuetto" (Franco Califano, Dario Baldan Bembo)
2. "Tu sei così" (Luigi Albertelli, Massimo Guantini)

== Charts ==
Chart (1973)	Peak position
Italy (Musica e dischi)	2

== Certifications ==
Region	Certification	Certified units/sales
Italy (FIMI) Sales from 2009	2× Platinum	200,000^{‡}
^{‡} Sales+streaming figures based on certification alone.
