= È proprio come vivere =

Studio album by Mia Martini
- Released: 1974
- Genre: Pop
- Length: 41:48
- Language: Italian
- Label: Dischi Ricordi
- Producer: Gianni Sanjust

Mia Martini chronology
Il giorno dopo (1973)	È proprio come vivere (1974)	Sensi e controsensi (1975)

Singles from È proprio come vivere
- 1. "Inno" Released: 1974

É proprio come vivere is the fourth studio album by Italian singer Mia Martini, released in 1974 through Dischi Ricordi.

== Overview ==
Gianni Sanjust is once again the producer of the recording. Among the new songwriters on the album are Maurizio Vandelli (member of Equipe 84), who wrote the music for the song "Un'età", and Alberto Salerno (author of the super hit "Io vagabondo" by Nomadi), who wrote "Ritratti della mia incoscienza".

The song "Agapimu" was written by Mia Martini herself in collaboration with Giovanni Conte. It is noteworthy that five years later, singer Ana Belén will perform this song in Spanish and it will become the leader of the charts in Spain. In 1989, Martini would re-record this song for the album Martini Mia....

The song "Inno" was released as a single from the album with "...e stelle stan piovendo" on the flip side, however, a limited edition was later released with "...e stelle stan piovendo" on the first side, as it became more popular with listeners than expected. The single reached the maximum third position in the singles chart, and also received gold status.

The album itself was also popular, it received gold certification, and by the end of the year it had sold over 300,000 copies, it took sixth place in the weekly album chart.

== Track listing ==
Side A
No.	Title	Writer(s)	Length
1.	"Inno"	Maurizio Piccoli; Dario Baldan Bembo	4:25
2.	"Il viaggio"	Luigi Albertelli; Maurizio Fabrizio	5:07
3.	"Domani"	Albertelli; Giancarlo Colonnello	4:25
4.	"...e stelle stan piovendo"	Piccoli	3:36
5.	"Alba"	Albertelli; Massimo Guantini	3:37

Side B
No.	Title	Writer(s)	Length
1.	"Agapimu"	Mia Martini; Giovanni Conte; Baldan Bembo	4:08
2.	"Un'età"	Maurizio Piccoli; Baldan Bembo; Maurizio Vandelli	3:15
3.	"Gentile se vuoi"	Albertelli; Michelangelo La Bionda; Carmelo La Bionda	3:19
4.	"Luna bianca"	Piccoli; Baldan Bembo; Leonardo Ricchi	4:56
5.	"Ritratti della mia incoscienza"	Alberto Salerno; Fabrizio	5:00

== Charts ==
Chart performance for È proprio come vivere
Chart (1974)	Peak position
Italian Albums (Musica e dischi)	6
