= Che vuoi che sia... se t'ho aspettato tanto =

Studio album by Mia Martini
- Released: 1976
- Genre: Pop
- Length: 39:59
- Language: Italian
- Label: Come Il Vento; RCA
- Producer: Antonio Coggio

Mia Martini chronology
Un altro giorno con me (1975)	Che vuoi che sia... se t'ho aspettato tanto (1976)	Per amarti (1977)

Singles from Che vuoi che sia... se t'ho aspettato tanto
- 1. "Che vuoi che sia... se t'ho aspettato tanto" Released: 1976

Che vuoi che sia... se t'ho aspettato tanto is the seventh studio album by Italian singer Mia Martini, released in 1976 by Come Il Vento and distributed by RCA Italiana.

== Track listing ==
1. "Ma sono solo giorni" (Paolo Amerigo Cassella, Amedeo Minghi) – 3:57
2. "Io donna, io persona" (Carmelo Carucci, Gianfranco Manfredi) – 4:56
3. "Che vuoi che sia... se t'ho aspettato tanto" (Paolo Amerigo Cassella, Dario Baldan Bembo) – 4:40
4. "Se mi sfiori..." (Armando Mango, Silvano D'Auria) – 3:54
5. "In Paradiso" (Paolo Amerigo Cassella, Memmo Foresi) – 3:45
6. "Fiore di melograno" (Paolo Amerigo Cassella, Memmo Foresi) – 3:13
7. "Una come lei" (Paolo Amerigo Cassella, Memmo Foresi) – 3.46
8. "Noi due" (Paolo Amerigo Cassella, Memmo Foresi) – 4.59
9. "Elegia" (Carmelo Carucci, Claudio Daiano) – 2:49
10. "Preghiera" (Stefano Rosso) – 4:00

== Charts ==
Chart performance for Che vuoi che sia... se t'ho aspettato tanto
Chart (1976)	Peak position
Italian Albums (Musica e dischi)	17
