= Viscuso =

Viscuso is a surname of Italian origin. It is an Italian surname derived from the Sicilian word "viscusu", which literately means "tough" or "the one who is tenacious". Viscuso is decidedly Sicilian, above all of Catania, the Aci Castello, Mascalucia and Misterbianco and Bagheria (PA) and Palermo, the origin of these surnames is obscure, one could hypothesize a derivation from names of localities characterized by the presence of a forest, through betacismo of a dialectal form, but it is a hypothesis all to be confirmed, another hypothesis might be that of a connection with the Latin term episcopus after profound dialectal changes. Notable people with the surname include:

- Emanuele Viscuso (born 1952), Italian sculptor
- Marivana Viscuso, Italian singer living in the United States
- Sal Viscuso (born 1948), American actor
