= Donna sola =

Single by Mia Martini

from the album Nel mondo, una cosa
- B-side: "Questo amore vero"
- Released: 15 September 1972
- Genre: Pop; ballad
- Length: 4:20
- Label: Ricordi
- Composer: Dario Baldan Bembo
- Lyricists: Bruno Lauzi; Luigi Albertelli
- Producer: Giovanni Sanjust

Mia Martini singles chronology
"Piccolo uomo" (1972)	"Donna sola" (1972)	"Minuetto" (1973)

Audio
- "Donna sola" on YouTube

"Donna sola" ("Lonely Woman") is a 1972 Italian song composed by Dario Baldan Bembo (music), Bruno Lauzi, and Luigi Albertelli (lyrics) and performed by Mia Martini.

== Overview ==
While looking for a suitable follow-up for Martini's first hit "Piccolo uomo", her producer Giovanni Sanjust listened to a Dario Baldan Bembo's instrumental song recorded by Gianni Bedori with the title "Inverno", and thought that with the right lyrics it would be a success. He first gave the task of drafting the lyrics to Luigi Albertelli, who penned an early version titled "Sola". After recording a demo, Martini was not satisfied with the result and asked Bruno Lauzi to rewrite the lyrics, with Lauzi retaining only a few lines, including the "sola" in the refrain.

The song turned to be both a commercial and critical success, and won the Mostra di musica leggera di Venezia. Martini recorded the song in Spanish as "Mujer sola", as well as two versions in French and German that have remained unreleased.

== Track listing ==
No.	Title	Writer(s)	Length
1.	"Donna sola"	Lauzi, Albertelli, Baldan Bembo	3:32
2.	"Questo amore vero"	Albertelli, Massimo Guantini	3:21

== Charts ==
Chart (1972–1973)	Peak position
Italy (Musica e dischi)	2
