= Aria (song) =

Single by Dario Baldan Bembo

from the album Aria
- B-side: "Nico"
- Released: 1975
- Genre: Pop
- Label: Come Il Vento
- Songwriters: Dario Baldan Bembo, Sergio Bardotti

Dario Baldan Bembo singles chronology
"Aria" (1975)	"Crescendo" (1975)

Audio
- "Aria" on YouTube

"Aria" is a 1975 song composed by Dario Baldan Bembo (music) and Sergio Bardotti (lyrics). The song marked the solo debut as a singer of Dario Baldan Bembo, a former Equipe 84 member already well known as a session-man and a composer. The song was major hit, ranking #2 on the Italian hit parade.

The song was covered by numerous artists, including Sheila, Shirley Bassey, Michel Legrand, Herbie Mann. An instrumental cover by Acker Bilk reached number 5 on the UK singles chart in 1976.

== Track listing ==
7" single – ZCVE 50420

1. "Aria" (Dario Baldan Bembo, Sergio Bardotti)
2. "Nico" (Dario Baldan Bembo, Sergio Bardotti)

== Charts ==
Chart	Peak position
Italy	2
