= Kiss Me First =

2003 film

- Film poster
- Directed by: Ambrogio Lo Giudice
- Written by: Ambrogio Lo Giudice
- Starring: Stefania Rocca; Marco Cocci; Luca Zingaretti
- Cinematography: Gianfilippo Corticelli
- Music by: Lucio Dalla
- Production company: Sunflower Production
- Distributed by: United International Pictures
- Release date: 7 November 2003
- Running time: 93 minutes
- Country: Italy
- Language: Italian

Kiss Me First (Italian: Prima dammi un bacio) is a 2003 Italian romantic comedy film directed by Ambrogio Lo Giudice. It was entered into the 26th Moscow International Film Festival. It won the Nastro d'Argento for best original song ("Prima dammi un bacio" by Lucio Dalla).

== Cast ==
- Stefania Rocca as Adele
- Marco Cocci as Marcello
- Luca Zingaretti as Loris
- Camilla Filippi as Jane
- Fiorella Mannoia as Irene
- Giulia Steigerwalt as Marianna
