= Piccolo uomo =

Single by Mia Martini

from the album Nel mondo, una cosa
- B-side: "Madre"
- Released: 1972
- Genre: Pop; ballad
- Length: 4:20
- Label: Ricordi
- Composer: Dario Baldan Bembo
- Lyricists: Bruno Lauzi; Michelangelo La Bionda
- Producer: Giovanni Sanjust

Mia Martini singles chronology
"Credo" (1972)	"Piccolo uomo" (1972)	"Donna sola" (1972)

Audio
- "Piccolo uomo" on YouTube

"Piccolo uomo" (transl. "Little Man") is a 1972 Italian song composed by Dario Baldan Bembo (music), Bruno Lauzi and Michelangelo La Bionda (lyrics), and performed by Mia Martini. It was the singer's first significant commercial success.

== Background ==
When Dario Baldan Bembo presented this ballad to Ricordi, he expected it to be recorded by the successful band I Camaleonti, but producer Giovanni Sanjust felt it was the right song to definitely launch the career of upcoming singer Mia Martini. This led to a great disagreement between the two, with Baldan Bembo even refusing to play Hammond organ in Martini's audition. Following the success of the song, Baldan Bembo eventually became one of the closest collaborators and more trusted songwriters of Martini. The title of the song came from an epithet the wife of the short-in-stature lyricist Bruno Lauzi used to call him.

"Piccolo uomo" was initially ignored by the public, being even eliminated by Un disco per l'estate selections. It was later presented at Festivalbar, turning into a big hit and winning the competition. It got Martini her first magazine cover, for the music magazine Ciao 2001. The B-side of the single is a cover of John Lennon's "Mother", with Italian lyrics by Martini.

The song was also recorded by Mia Martini in French (with the title "Tout Petit Homme"), German (as "Auf der Welt") and Spanish (as "Pequeño hombre"). In 1973, Pop-Tops recorded an English-language cover of the song entitled "My Little Woman".

== Track listing ==
7" single – SRL 10669
1. "Piccolo uomo" (Bruno Lauzi, Michelangelo La Bionda, Dario Baldan Bembo)
2. "Madre" (John Lennon, Mia Martini)

== Charts ==
Chart (1972)	Peak position
Italy (Musica e dischi)	2
