= Fiorella Mannoia =

Italian singer and songwriter (born 1954)

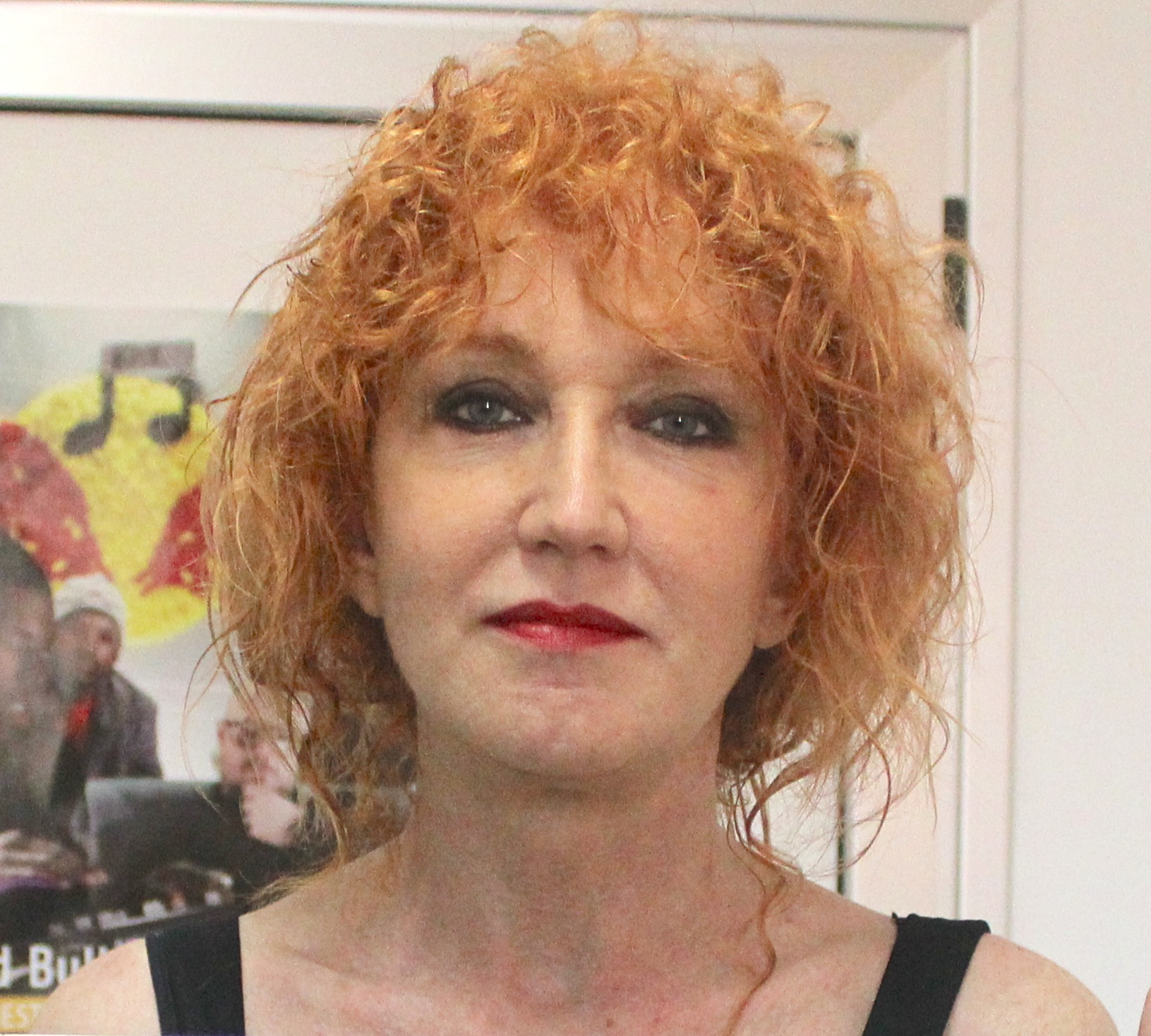
- Mannoia in 2013

Background information
- Born: 4 April 1954 (age 72); Rome, Italy
- Genres: Pop; soul
- Occupations: Singer; songwriter
- Years active: 1968–present
- Labels: Carisch; It; RCA Italiana; Dischi Ricordi; CGD; Ariston; DDD; Sony
- Spouse: Carlo Di Francesco (m. 2021)
- Website: www.fiorellamannoia.it

Fiorella Mannoia (Italian pronunciation: [fjoˈrɛlla manˈnɔːja]; born 4 April 1954) is an Italian singer and songwriter.

== Biography ==
=== Beginnings ===
Fiorella Mannoia was born in Rome in 1954. Her father Luigi, from Sicily, was a film stunt double, and Fiorella, her brother Maurizio and sister Patrizia began work in this area as children. Fiorella Mannoia's first film role as a stuntwoman was at the age of 13 in the film Non cantare, spara! ("Don't Sing, Shoot!") (1968). She often acted as a stand-in for Monica Vitti, e.g., in Amore mio aiutami ("Help Me, My Love"), and was also a stand-in for Candice Bergen in The Hunting Party. She debuted in the world of music at the Castrocaro Music Festival in 1968, singing Un bambino sul leone ("A Child on the Lion") by Adriano Celentano. Although she didn't win, she obtained a record contract with Carisch, with whom she recorded her first 45, Ho saputo che partivi ("I Found Out You Were Leaving"), which had on the B-side Le ciliegie ("The Cherries"), written by the young guitarist Riccardo Zappa.

In the Spring of 1968, she participated in Un disco per l'estate ("A Record for Summer"), a Summer song festival broadcast on RAI, with the song Gente qua, gente là ("People Here, People There"), the music for which was written by Bruno De Filippi, while the lyrics were written by her producer, Alberto Testa. Her third 45 featured Mi piace quel ragazzo lì ("I Like That Boy Over There"), whose text is dedicated to Adriano Celentano, with Occhi negli occhi ("Eyes Into Eyes") on the B-side, reused from the previous record. These discs, while still being influenced by certain "beat" sounds, presented evidence of Mannoia's vocal qualities, although they did not sell well. The tracks are available in the collection I primi passi ("The First Steps")(1998), containing songs by Fiorella Mannoia and Carla Bissi, published by On Sale Music.

In 1970 she got to know the singer and guitarist Memmo Foresi, who had put out some 45s as a solo act and with whom she formed a relationship. After signing a contract with the label It founded by Vincenzo Micocci, in 1971 she cut a 45 of a song written by Enzo Perrotti and a Foresi track on the B-side; this too went unnoticed.

The next year, the collaboration with Memmo Foresi led to the release of the album Mannoia Foresi & co. for RCA Italiana. The track Ma quale sentimento ("But What Feeling") was retitled Prologo ("Prologue") for release as a single. In 1974, her new single Ninna nanna (with Rose on the B-side) was censored (and so withdrawn from sale) because of the lyrics by Marco Luberti, which were considered too raw. Fiorella Mannoia then decided to leave RCA and go to the label Ricordi, with whom she released three 45s, Piccolo ("Little", lyrics by Sergio Bardotti and Ruggero Cini), Tu amore mio ("You Love of Mine") and Scaldami ("Warm Me Up").

In the early 70s, she had minor roles in the spaghetti Westerns Un colt in mano del diavolo ("A Colt in the Hand of the Devil") (1972), E il terzo giorno arrivò il corvo ("And on the Third Day, the Crow Arrived") (1973) and Sei bounty killers per una strage ("Six Bounty Killers for a Massacre") (1973).

=== Sanremo Music Festival ===
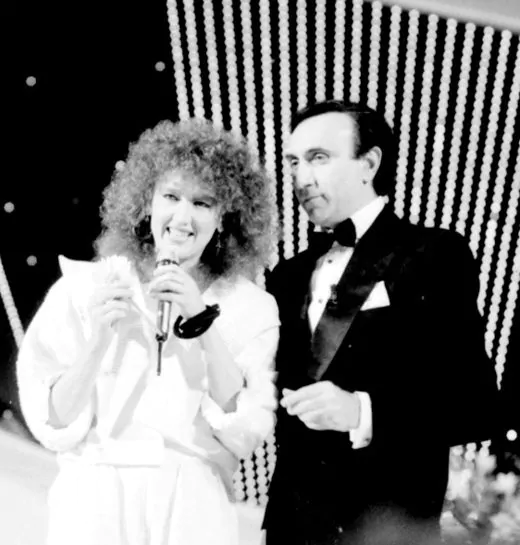
Mannoia with Sanremo 1984 presenter Pippo Baudo

On leaving the label Ricordi, Mannoia signed with CGD. Her first recording for the new label was not for a record of her own but for an album by Pierangelo Bertoli, entitled Certi momenti ("Certain Moments"). She sang a duet with Bertoli on Pescatore ("Fisherman") and the great success of this single and of the album, also helped to make her name known.

In 1981, she performed at the Sanremo Music Festival with Caffè nero bollente ("Boiling Black Coffee"), (written by Mimmo Cavallo and arranged by Antonio Coggio) which made her widely known in Italy. That year she also had a moderate hit with E muoviti un po' ("And Move a Little"), written by the Torinese singer-songwriter Valerio Liboni, with whom she took part in Festivalbar. She continued recording albums and 45s produced by Mario Lavezzi. She again changed record companies, moving to Ariston.

She entered the Sanremo Music Festival once more in 1984 with Come si cambia ("As One Changes"), written by Renato Pareti, which had a certain amount of sales success. She won the final of Premiatissima with the song Margherita by Riccardo Cocciante. In 1985, L'aiuola ("The Flowerbed") was a big hit for her and the album Premiatissima '84, which included Margherita, was released.

=== Success ===
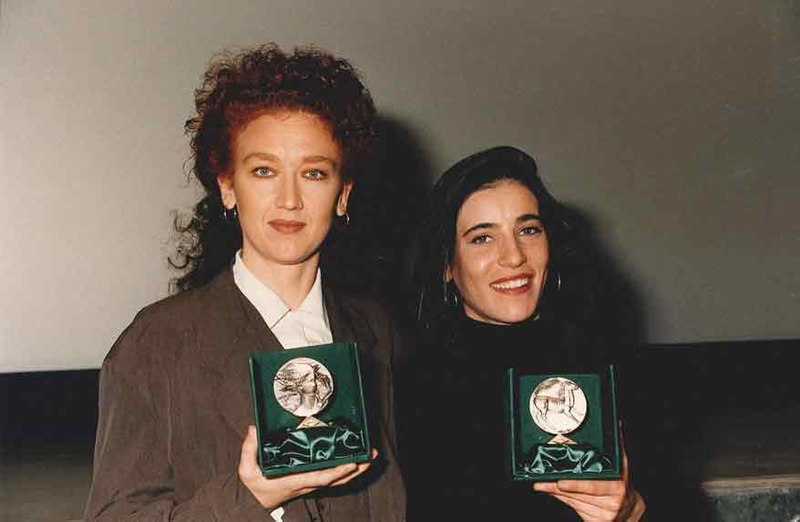
Mannoia with Paola Turci at Sanremo 1988

Great success came when she changed labels to DDD and subsequently won the Critic's Prize at the Sanremo Music Festival for two years in a row. In 1987, she won with Quello che le donne non-dicono ("What Women Don’t Say"), her first number-one hit, written specifically for her by Enrico Ruggeri and Luigi Schiavone. She won again in 1988 with Le notti di maggio ("The Nights of May"), written by Ivano Fossati. In 1988, the album Canzoni per parlare was released, which included these and other songs by leading Italian songwriters, including Ron and Riccardo Cocciante. This was also her first record produced by the musical director and guitarist Piero Fabrizi, who has played an important role in all of her subsequent work.

The album Di terra e di vento, on which she collaborated for the first time with Francesco De Gregori, was released in 1989. This album also contains an Italian version of the song O Que Será ("Oh What Will Be") by the great Brazilian singer-songwriter Chico Buarque de Hollanda, sung as a duet with Ivano Fossati, who also translated the lyrics from Portuguese.

In 1992, Fiorella Mannoia released the pivotal album I treni a vapore, which, as well as the title track by Ivano Fossati, also contains the popular tracks Il cielo d'Irlanda ("The Sky of Ireland") by Massimo Bubola, Tutti cercano qualcosa ("Everybody Is Looking for Something") by Francesco De Gregori and Inevitabilmente (Lettera dal carcere) ("Inevitably (Letter from Jail)") by Enrico Ruggeri and Luigi Schiavone, which was used on the soundtrack of the film Caro diario by Nanni Moretti.

Her next album Gente comune was released in 1994. Highlights include the songs Crazy Boy, written for her by Samuele Bersani and Piero Fabrizi, Il culo del mondo ("The Arse of the World") written by the Brazilian singer-songwriter Caetano Veloso, who sang with her on this number, and Giovanna d'Arco ("Joan of Arc"), written for her by Francesco de Gregori.

On Belle speranze (1997) she collaborated with younger songwriters including Daniele Silvestri and Gianmaria Testa. This album also contained the ironic Non sono un cantautore ("I Am Not a Singer-Songwriter") written by Piero Fabrizi. Certe piccole voci (1999), the first live album of her career, contained the Vasco Rossi song Sally, one of her most popular numbers. This double CD was a huge hit in Italy, reaching number one a couple of months after release, and, ultimately, double platinum status.

=== 2000s ===
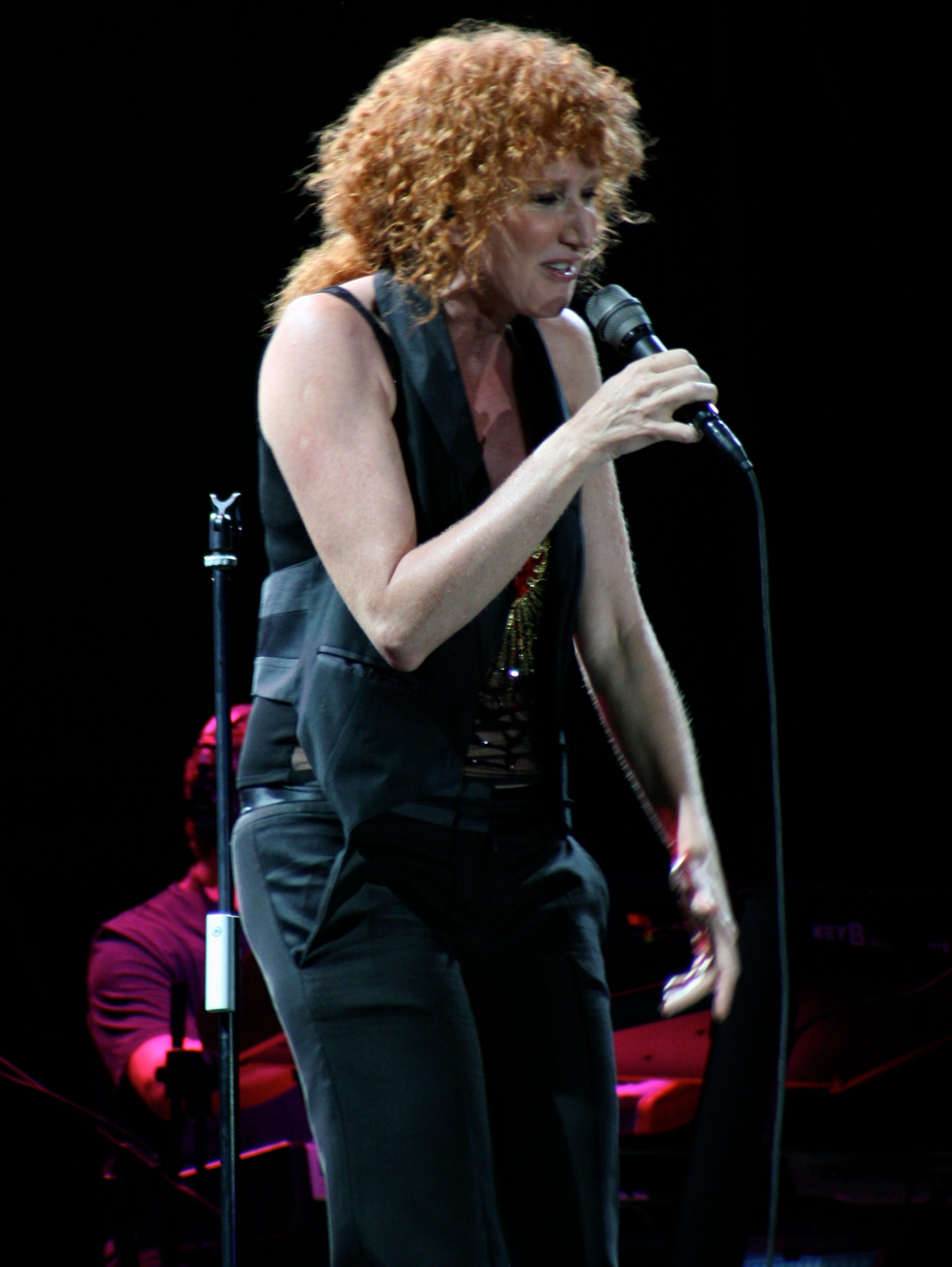
Mannoia in concert in 2009

In 2000, Fiorella Mannoia was invited to the 50th Festival of Sanremo as Italian Super Host.

During the early to mid-2000s, she did a lot of touring, initially with Pino Daniele, Francesco De Gregori and Ron, and more recently solo. After the studio album Fragile (2001), Fiorella Mannoia released the live album In tour (2002) with Daniele, De Gregori and Ron. Returning to her cinema roots, she played a cameo role in the film Prima dammi un bacio ("First Give Me a Kiss") (2003), a romantic comedy written and directed by Ambrogio Lo Giudice. In 2003, she dueted with Niccolò Fabi, recording the song "Offeso", included in his album La cura del tempo.

In 2004, the solo live album Concerti (2004) was released, together with Due anni di concerti, a DVD recorded at the visually stunning Teatro Valli di Reggio Emilia. In 2005, she sang three songs at the Live 8 concert, Rome: Sally, Clandestino (written by Manu Chao), and Mio fratello che guarda il mondo ("My Brother Who Looks at the World"), written by Ivano Fossati.

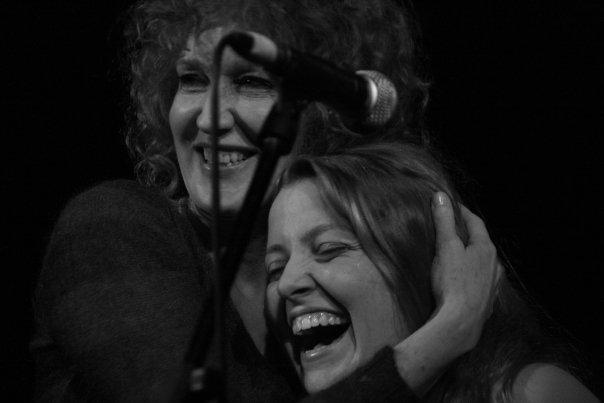
Mannoia hugging Noemi at a 2009 concert

During her career, Fiorella Mannoia has won the prestigious Targa Tenco (Tenco Prize) for Italian singers five times. She is the only performer to have won the Targa Tenco in this category more than once.

On 2 June 2005 the President of Italy, Carlo Azeglio Ciampi, conferred on Fiorella Mannoia the rank of Ufficiale (Officer) in the Ordine al Merito della Repubblica Italiana (Order of Merit of the Republic of Italy).

In 2006 she released the single Cravo e canela (“Clove and Cinnamon”), written by Milton Nascimento (with whom she sings on the recording) and Ronaldo Bastos. This was followed by the album Onda tropicale, from which the single was taken. The tracks on the album, six translated into Italian by Piero Fabrizi and five in the original Portuguese, are all from the rich carioca repertoire of Brazil. All of the tracks are duets with well-known Brazilian artists (Milton Nascimento, Caetano Veloso, Chico Buarque, Chico César, Gilberto Gil, Djavan, Carlinhos Brown, Lenine, Jorge Benjor and Adriana Calcanhotto). This was the first time anyone had succeeded in bringing all these important Brazilian artists together in a single project. Her longtime collaborator Piero Fabrizi, guitarist, musical director, arranger and songwriter, again played an important role on this album.

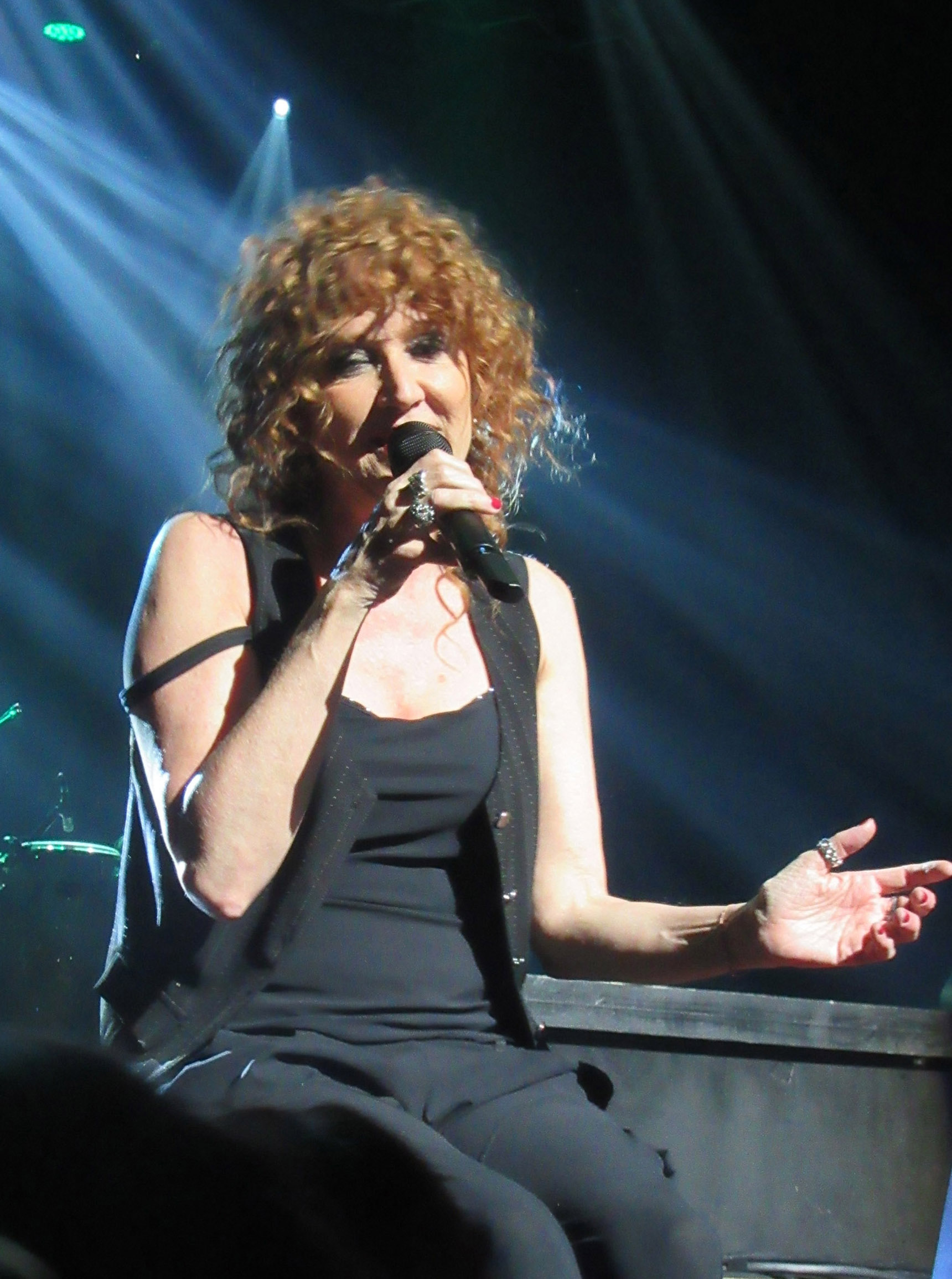
Fiorella Mannoia in concert at Teatro Comunale Ponchielli in Cremona, December 2017

Mannoia competed in the Sanremo Music Festival 2017 with "Che sia benedetta", ultimately coming second. She competed in the Sanremo Music Festival 2024 with "Mariposa". In October 2026, she joined the cast of The Voice Senior as one of the coaches.

=== Other ventures ===
Fiorella Mannoia has also devoted herself to social issues, lending her attention to subjects such as abortion and divorce, and has also expressed her solidarity with the aid association Emergency.

During her career, Fiorella Mannoia has sung in a number of languages including French, Spanish, Portuguese and English, as well as Neapolitan and her native Italian.

== Discography ==
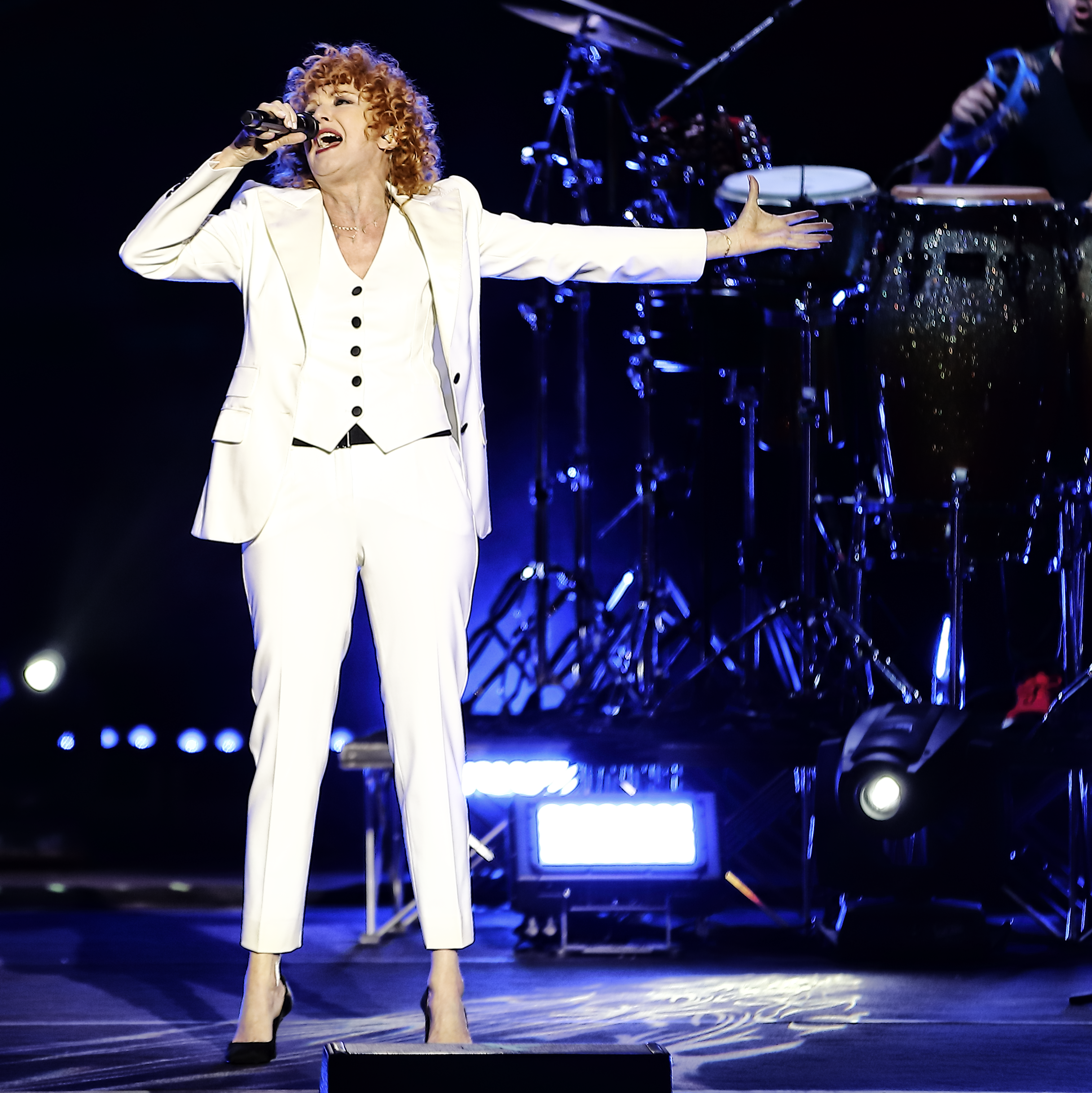
Fiorella Mannoia performing at Parco della Musica in Rome, July 2019

=== 45 rpm ===
- Ho saputo che partivi/Le ciliegie (Carisch, VCA 26201) (1968)
- Gente qua gente là/Occhi negli occhi (Carisch, VCA 26205) (1969)
- Mi piace quel ragazzo lì/Occhi negli occhi (Carisch, VCA 26208) (1969)
- Ore sei/Mi gira la testa (It) (1971)
- Ma quale sentimento/Che cos'è (RCA Italiana) (1972)
- Ninna nanna/Rose (RCA Italiana) (1974)
- Piccolo/Che sete ho (Dischi Ricordi, SRL 10.818) (1976)
- Tu amore mio/Viva (Dischi Ricordi, SRL 10.842) (1977)
- Scaldami/Cover girl (Dischi Ricordi, SRL 10.881) (1978)
- Caffè nero bollente/Meno male che il temporale sta passando (CGD) (1981)
- E muoviti un pò/Vigliacca notte nera (CGD) (1981)
- Il posto delle viole /Torneranno gli angeli (CGD) (1983)
- Come si cambia/Fai piano (Ariston) (1984)
- Ogni volta che vedo il mare/Chiara (Ariston) (1984)
- L'aiuola/Canto e vivo (Ariston) (1985)
- Quello che le donne non-dicono/Ti ruberò (DDD) (1987)
- Le notti di maggio/Fino a fermarmi (DDD) (1988)
- Il tempo non-torna più/Le notti di maggio (DDD) (1988)
- La giostra della memoria/Lunaspina (Epic) (1990)
- Cuore di cane/Oh che sarà (Epic) (1990)

=== CD singles ===
- Le notti di maggio ("The Nights of May") (DDD) (1988)
- Cuore di cane ("Heart of a Dog") (Polydor) (1992)
- I venti del cuore ("The Winds of the Heart") (Epic) (1992)
- Il cielo d'Irlanda ("The Sky of Ireland") (Epic) (1992)
- L'altra madre ("The Other Mother") (Sony) (1992)
- Crazy boy (Sony) (1994)
- Belle speranze ("Beautiful Hopes") (Sony) (1997)
- Non sono un cantautore ("I Am Not a Singer-Songwriter") (Sony) (1997)
- Il fiume e la nebbia ("The River and the Fog") (Sony) (1997)
- Sally (Sony) (1998)
- L'amore si odia duet with Noemi (Sony) (2009)
- Il peso del coraggio ("The Weight of Courage") (2019)
- Mariposa (2024)

=== LPs and CDs ===
- Mannoia Foresi & co (RCA Italiana) (1972)
- Fiorella Mannoia (CGD)(1982, reissued in 1983 with the addition of Caffè nero bollente ("Steaming Black Coffee") and E muoviti un po' ("And Get Moving a Little"))
- Momento delicato ("Delicate Moment") (Ariston) (1985, reissued in 1990 under the title Canto e vivo ("I Sing and I Live") with the addition of the song Come si cambia ("As One Changes"))
- Premiatissima '84 (Ariston) (1985)
- Fiorella Mannoia (Ariston) (1986)
- Canzoni per parlare ("Songs for Talk") (DDD) (1988)
- Di terra e di vento ("Of Earth and Wind") (Epic) (1989)
- I treni a vapore ("The Steam Trains") (Sony) (1992)
- Gente comune ("Common People") (Sony) (1994)
- Belle speranze ("Beautiful Hopes") (Sony) (1997)
- Certe piccole voci ("Certain Little Voices") (Sony) (1999)
- Fragile ("Fragile") (Sony) (2001)
- In tour ("On Tour") (Sony) (2002)
- Concerti ("Concerts") (Sony) (2004)
- Onda tropicale ("Tropical Wave") (Sony) (2006)
- Canzoni nel tempo (Sony) (2007) – (2 x Platinum 170,000+ copies)
- Il movimento del dare (Sony) (2008) – (Platinum – 105,000+ copies)
- Ho imparato a sognare (Sony) (2009) – (Platinum – 100,000+ copies)
- Personale ("Personal") (2019)
- Padroni di niente ("Masters of Nothing") (2020)

=== Compilation CDs ===
- Tre anni di successi ("Three Years of Hits") (Durium) (1987)
- Canto e vivo ("I Sing and I Live") (Dischi Ricordi) (1989)
- Basta innamorarsi ("It’s Enough to Fall in Love") (Dischi Ricordi) (1989)
- Così cantiamo l’amore ("We Sing of Love This Way") (Dischi Ricordi) (1991)
- Come si cambia '77-'87 ("As One Changes '77–'87") (Dischi Ricordi) (1992)
- Le canzoni ("The Songs") (Sony) (1993)
- Le origini ("The Origins") (Dischi Ricordi) (1996)
- Il meglio ("The Best") (Dischi Ricordi) (1997)
- I primi passi ("The First Steps") (On Sale Music) (1998)
- I grandi successi originali ("The Original Big Hits") (Sony) (2001)

=== DVDs ===
- Due anni di concerti ("Two Years of Concerts") (Sony) (2004)
- Live in Roma 2005 (2006) (BUR/Sony) (package includes the book Biografia di una voce ("Biography of a Voice") by Fiorella Mannoia)
- Ho imparato a sognare ("I learned to dream") (Sony BMG Europe) (2009)

== Filmography ==
=== Films ===
| Year | Title | Role |
|---|---|---|
| 1972 | Il magnifico west | Mary |
| 1972 | La chiamavano Verità | Waitress |
| 1972 | Una colt in mano al diavolo | Grace Scott |
| 1973 | E il terzo giorno arrivò il corvo | Sally Kennedy |
| 1973 | Sei bounty killers per una strage | Rossella |
| 2003 | Kiss Me First | Irene |
| 2016 | 7 Minutes | Ornella |

== Prizes ==
- 1987 – Sanremo Music Festival: Critic's Prize for Quello che le donne non-dicono
- 1988 – Sanremo Music Festival: Critic's Prize for Le notti di maggio
- 1988 – Targa Tenco: best singer for Canzoni per parlare
- 1990 – Targa Tenco: best singer for Di terra e di vento
- 1995 – Targa Tenco: best singer for Gente comune
- 1999 – Targa Tenco: best singer for Certe piccole voci
- 2004 – Targa Tenco: best singer for Concerti
- 2006 – Oscar Capitolino
