= Mariella Nava =

Italian singer-songwriter

- Born: 3 February 1960 (age 66); Taranto, Italy
- Occupation: Singer-songwriter

Mariella Nava, stage name of Maria Giuliana Nava (born 3 February 1960) is an Italian singer-songwriter and composer.

== Life and career ==
Born in Taranto, Nava made her official debut as a songwriter in 1985 with the song "Questi figli", which she had sent by mail to Gianni Morandi and which Morandi included in his album Uno su mille. In 1987, she started a long collaboration with the producers Antonio Coggio and Roberto Davini; the same year she debuted at the Sanremo Music Festival with the song "Fai piano".

Between 1987 and 2005, Nava entered the competition at the Sanremo Festival eight times, ranking third in 1999 with the song "Così è la vita". As a songwriter, she collaborated with Andrea Bocelli, Renato Zero, Lucio Dalla, Mango, Amii Stewart, Ornella Vanoni, Loredana Bertè, Eduardo De Crescenzo, Mietta, Gigi D'Alessio among others. In 2005, her song "It's Forever", sung in a duet with Dionne Warwick, was chosen as the official song of the FIS Alpine World Ski Championships held in Bormio.

== Discography ==
=== Album ===
- 1988 - Per paura o per amore
- 1989 - Il giorno e la notte
- 1991 - Crescendo
- 1992 - Mendicante e altre storie
- 1994 - Scrivo
- 1994 - Uscire (collection with an unpublished song)
- 1998 - Dimmi che mi vuoi bene
- 1999 - Così è la vita
- 2000 - Pazza di te
- 2002 - Questa sono io
- 2004 - Condivisioni
- 2007 - Dentro una rosa
- 2012 - Tempo mosso
- 2013 - Sanremo si, Sanremo no (collection with two unpublished songs)
- 2017 - Epoca
