= Antonio Coggio =

Italian composer, arranger, pianist, and record producer (1939–2021)

- Born: 16 May 1939; Savona, Italy
- Died: 19 October 2021 (aged 82); Rome, Italy
- Occupations: Composer, arranger, pianist and record producer
- Years active: 1964–2021

Antonio Coggio (16 May 1939 – 19 October 2021) was an Italian composer, arranger, pianist, and record producer.

After his studies at the Conservatorio Niccolò Paganini in Genoa, between 1964 and 1966 Coggio was pianist for Gino Paoli, accompanying him in live performances and in the album Paoli dal vivo allo Studio D. He was later hired by RCA Italiana, first as a musical assistant and later as a producer, producing, among others, works of Mia Martini, Ivano Fossati, Patty Pravo, Stefano Rosso and Claudio Baglioni. With Baglioni he also collaborated as a composer, penning some of his major hits, including "Questo piccolo grande amore", "E tu", "Amore Bello", "Poster".

In 1979 he founded with Roberto Davini the label Calycantus, which launched the careers of Fiorella Mannoia, Mariella Nava, Luca Barbarossa and Mimmo Cavallo.
