= Carrara (singer) =

Singer and musician

Alberto Carrara (born 1958), best known as Carrara and King Carrara, is an Italian singer, composer, arranger, music producer, and disc jockey. He has sold over three million records. In the 1990s he became a music producer with the label "Disco Magic".

== Career ==
Born in Bergamo, Carrara started his career as a disc jockey at 15. A self-taught musician, in 1983 he obtained his first success, "Disco King". One year later, he got his main success, "Shine on dance", which won the 1984 Festivalbar.

== Discography ==
=== Singles ===
Year	Single	Position			
Year	Single	AUT	FRA	ITA	SUI
1983	"Disco King"	—	—	39	—
1984	"Shine on Dance"	6	14	13	19
1985	"Ghibli"	—	—	—	—
1985	"Welcome to the Sunshine"	—	—	23	—
1985	"Follow Me"	—	—	—	—
1986	"S.O.S. Bandido"	—	—	22	—
1987	"Baby Dancer"	—	—	—	—
1992	"You Get Me Down" (feat. Leyla)	—	—	—	—
