= Marivana Viscuso =

- Birth name: Marivana Viscuso
- Origin: Palermo, Italy
- Genres: Pop
- Occupation(s): Singer, composer
- Instruments: Singing
- Years active: 1983–present
- Website: marivana.com

Marivana Viscuso is an Italian singer, songwriter and composer who lives in the U.S. state of Florida. Her song "Anuncio Classificado" was on Latin American Top 10 charts in 1993. Her brother is Emanuele Viscuso, a sculptor who was based in Miami Beach in the early 2000s.

In 2006, she was involved with a proposed charter school in Miami Beach, which planned to lease a building she owned that once housed an art gallery known as The Art Temple.

In 2007, she released, with the composer Louis Siciliano, the soundtrack for the Italian film Il Rabdomante directed by Fabrizio Cattani; she sings the song "Ya te olvidè". Now released new albums 'Seeds of Joy' and 'The voice of your emotions'.

In February 2016 released a new album Simply Marivana in digital download and in November she sing Dio come ti amo, a tribute to Domenico Modugno, in a compilation called L'anniversario del ragazzo del sud edited in Italy.

== Albums ==
#	Information
01	Marivana: Released: 1983; Singles: I musicisti (però le note), Ninnia
02	Seeds of Joy: Released: 2011
03	The voice of your emotions: Released: 2011; Singles: You only you
04	Simply Marivana: Released: 2016

== Singles ==
#	Information
01	"I musicisti (però le note)": Released: 1983
02	"Ninnia": Released: 1983
03	"Mille bolle blu": Released: 1983
04	"Che sarà": Released: 1983
05	"You only you": Released: 2011
06	"Dio come ti amo" (Tribute to Domenico Modugno): Released: 2016
