= Mimmo Cavallo =

Italian singer-songwriter (born 1951)

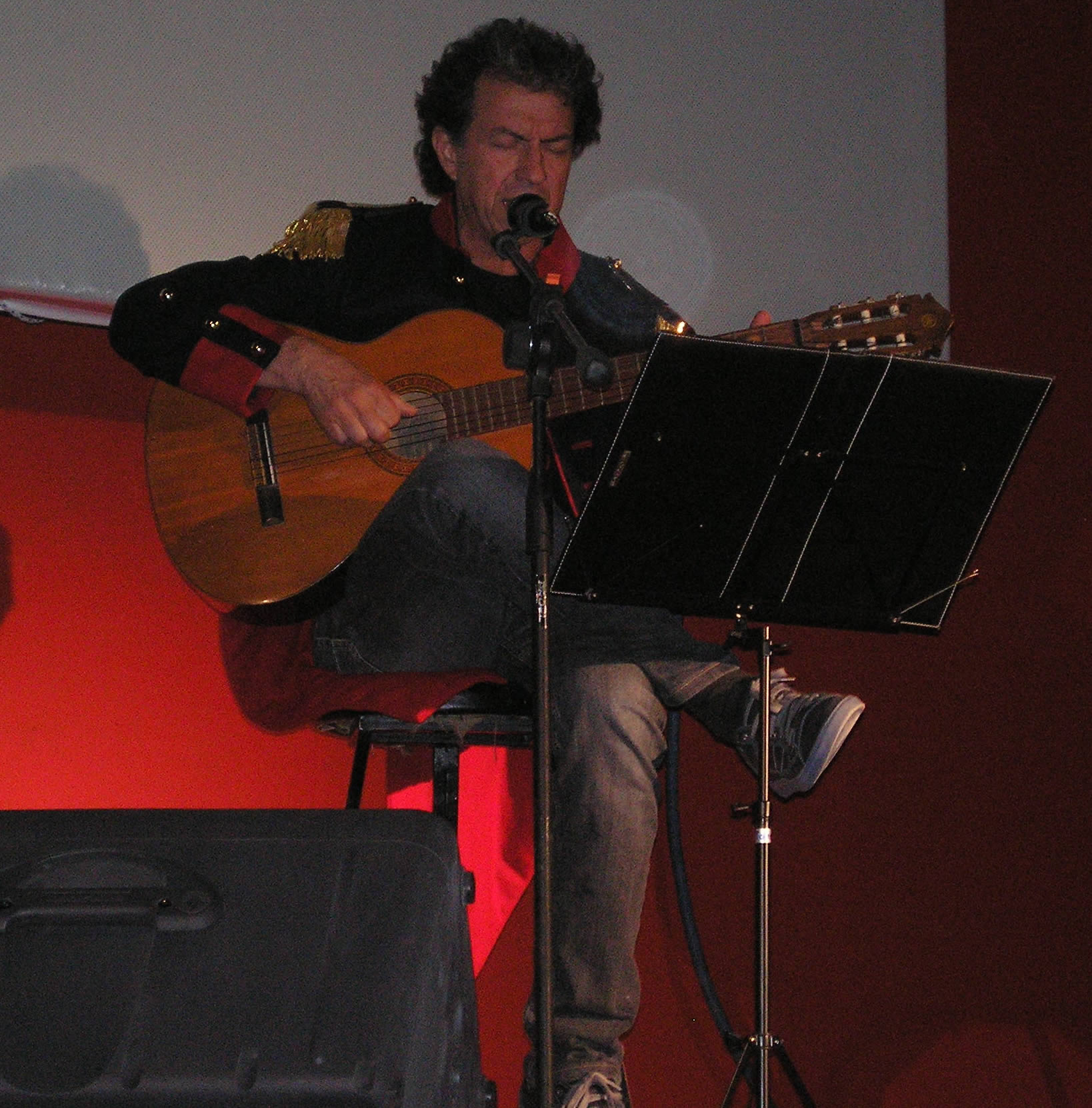
- Cavallo performing in 2011
- Born: Cosimo Cavallo; 1 January 1951 (age 75); Lizzano, Taranto, Italy
- Occupation: Singer-songwriter

Cosimo Cavallo (born 1 January 1951), best known as Mimmo Cavallo, is an Italian singer-songwriter and composer.

== Life and career ==
Born in Lizzano, Apulia, Cavallo spent his childhood in Turin, where his family had moved. At 17 years old he moved back in Apulia, where he started performing as a singer, and shortly later he moved to Rome, where he began his professional career.

In 1980, Cavallo released his first record, the concept album Siamo meridionali, which received large critical acclaim. Active as a songwriter for other artists, his collaborations include work Mia Martini, Zucchero Fornaciari, Ornella Vanoni, Gianni Morandi, Loredana Bertè and Fiorella Mannoia. He composed "Ma che storia è questa", the theme song of the RAI television program La storia d'Italia a fumetti by Enzo Biagi.

== Discography ==
Albums

- 1980 - Siamo meridionali (CGD, 20163)
- 1981 - Uh, mammà! (CGD, 20256)
- 1982 - Stancami, stancami musica (Fonit Cetra, LPX 112)
- 1989 - Non voglio essere uno spirito (DDD, 209 993)
- 1991 - L'incantautore (DDD, 262 893)
- 2011 - Quando saremo fratelli uniti
- 2014 - Dalla parte delle bestie
- 2017 - Puesta del Sol Tango
