= Dario Baldan Bembo =

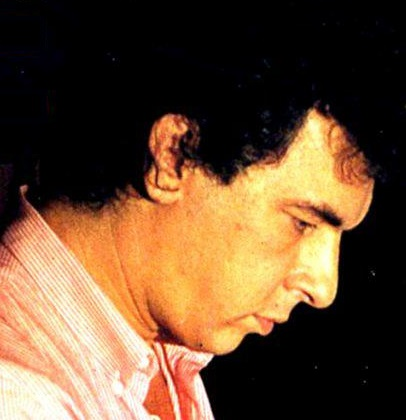

Background information
- Born: 15 May 1948 (age 78); Milan, Italy

Dario Baldan Bembo (born 15 May 1948) is an Italian composer, singer-songwriter, music arranger and musician, best known for the songs "Aria" and "Amico è".

== Background ==
Born in Milan, Baldan Bembo started his music career as a keyboardist for, among others, Lucio Battisti and Adriano Celentano.

In 1970, he joined the group Equipe 84, with whom he started working as a composer. In 1972 he got his first successes as author of two songs written for Mia Martini, "Piccolo uomo" and "Donna sola", followed in 1973 by "Minuetto" and in 1974 by "Inno". In 1975 he made his debut as a singer with the song "Aria", which ranked second in the Italian hit parade and became an international success.

In 1981 he entered the competition at the Sanremo Music Festival with the song "Tu cosa fai stasera", which ranked third; the song was later covered by Guys 'n' Dolls as "Broken Dreams" and by Sarah Brightman under the title "Just Show Me How to Love You". He came back in Sanremo in 1985, with the song "Da quando non ci sei".

His main hit as a songwriter was the song "Amico è", ending theme song of the Mike Bongiorno's quiz show SuperFlash, which later became a widely spread football chant.

As a composer, his collaborations include Daniel Sentacruz Ensemble, Mina and Ornella Vanoni. Céline Dion covered his songs "Dolce fiore" (released as a single with the title "L'amour viendra") and "L'amico è" (with the title "Hymne à l'amitié").

== Discography ==
=== Singles ===
- 1975 - Aria
- 1975 - Crescendo
- 1977 - Non mi lasciare
- 1978 - Piccolina
- 1979 - Giuro
- 1981 - Tu cosa fai stasera?
- 1983 - Amico è (with Caterina Caselli)
- 1983 - Voci di città
- 1984 - Flashback (as "Space Philharmonic")
- 1985 - Da quando non ci sei (una volta ancora)

=== Studio albums ===
- 1975 - Aria
- 1975 - Crescendo
- 1977 - Migrazione
- 1979 - Dario Baldan Bembo
- 1981 - Voglia d'azzurro
- 1982 - Etereo (as "Bembo's Orchestra")
- 1982 - Spirito della Terra
- 1985 - Spazi uniti
- 1991 - Un po' per vivere, un po' per sognare
- 1996 - Il canto dell'umanità
- 1999 - Amico è - I successi
