= Mia Martini =

Italian singer (1947–1995)

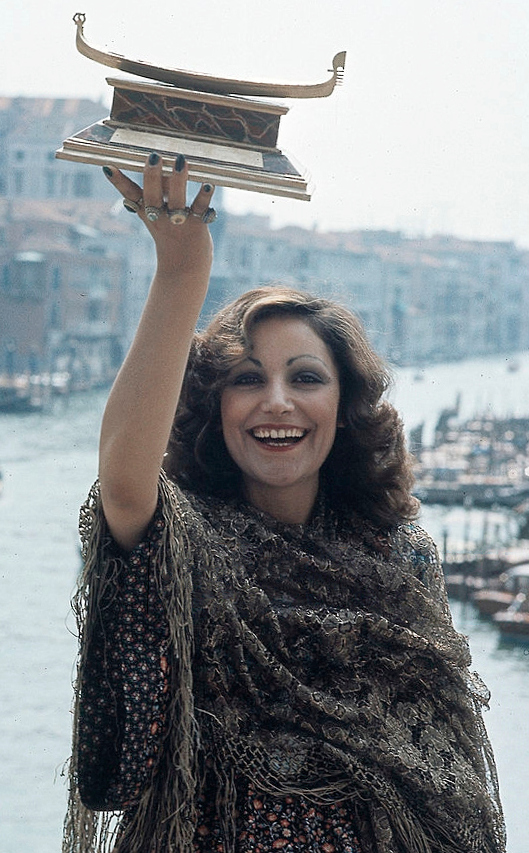
- Mia Martini in Venice in 1973, holding the Gondola d'Oro prize won with her song "Donna sola"

Background information
- Also known as: Mimì Bertè
- Born: Domenica Rita Adriana Bertè; 20 September 1947; Bagnara Calabra, Calabria, Italy
- Origin: Porto Recanati, Marche, Italy
- Died: 12 May 1995 (aged 47) Cardano al Campo, Lombardy, Italy
- Genres: Pop; blues; jazz; pop rock; canzone napoletana; folk music
- Occupations: Singer-songwriter; musician
- Years active: 1963–1983; 1989–1995

Domenica Rita Adriana "Mimì" Bertè (Italian pronunciation: [doˈmeːnika (miˈmi b)berˈtɛ]; 20 September 1947 – 12 May 1995), known professionally as Mia Martini (pronounced [ˈmiːa marˈtiːni]), was an Italian singer, songwriter and musician. She is considered, by many experts, one of the most important and expressive female voices of Italian music, characterised by her interpretative intensity and her soulful performance.

Her debut album, Oltre la collina with the song "Padre davvero" is regarded as one of the best Italian albums made by a female artist. Hit songs like "Piccolo uomo", "Donna sola", "Minuetto", "Inno", "Al mondo", "Che vuoi che sia se t'ho aspettato tanto", "Per amarti" and "La costruzione di un amore" made her one of the most popular artists of Italian music in the 1970s, both nationally and internationally. She is the only female artist to have won two Festivalbar consecutively, respectively in 1972 and in 1973. In 1977, two important encounters occurred in Martini's life: the first with Charles Aznavour, with whom she began a musical collaboration, and the second with singer-songwriter Ivano Fossati, with whom she started an artistic and sentimental partnership.

In 1982, she sang "E non finisce mica il cielo", written by Fossati, at the Sanremo Music Festival, where she received the Critics Award, which was created specifically for her interpretation and which was named after her as "Mia Martini" Critics Awards from 1996, the year after her death. In 1983, she was forced to leave the music industry and quit her career, as the music sector and colleagues considered her a person bringing bad luck and barred her from participating in any music and TV events, radio shows and concerts. This kept her away from the music scene for seven years. Only in 1989 was she able to reprise her career, when she returned to perform at the Sanremo Music Festival, singing "Almeno tu nell'universo", which brought her a new success.

Martini's later hits included "Gli uomini non cambiano", "La nevicata del '56" and "Cu' mme", the latter with Roberto Murolo. She represented Italy at the Eurovision Song Contest twice, in 1977 with the song "Libera" and in 1992 with "Rapsodia". She died from a drug overdose on 12 May 1995.

== Biography ==
=== Early life ===
Domenica Rita Adriana Bertè was born in Bagnara Calabra, Reggio Calabria, in southern Italy, on 20 September 1947, the second of four daughters: the oldest, Leda (born 1946), Loredana (born 1950) and the youngest Olivia (born 1958). Her father, Giuseppe Radames Bertè (1921–2017), was a teacher of Latin and Greek; born in Villa San Giovanni, he moved to Marche with his family, first working as a professor and later becoming high school headmaster in Ancona. Her mother, Maria Salvina Dato (1925–2003), born in Bagnara Calabra, was an elementary school teacher.

Bertè, nicknamed "Mimì", spent her childhood in Porto Recanati, Marche, where she showed an early interest in music. She began to perform at parties and dance halls and entered some song contests for new voices. In 1962, she convinced her mother to take her to Milan for an audition, with the hope of getting a record deal.

=== The beginnings as Mimì Bertè ===
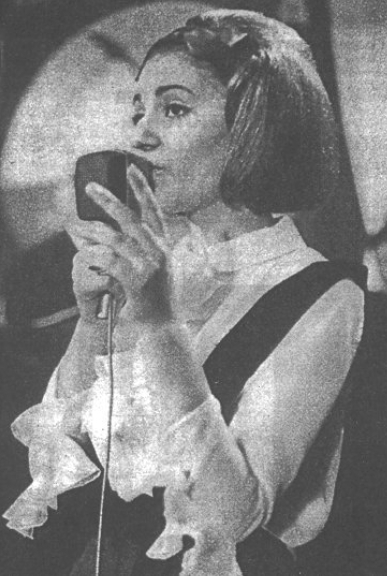
Mimì Bertè at Bellaria Festival (1964)

The only one willing to put her to the test was the author and music producer Carlo Alberto Rossi, who decided to launch her as a yé-yé girl, following the musical fashion of the moment. With the song "Ombrello blu", she participated in the Pesaro Festival. In 1963, the 16-year-old Mimì Bertè recorded her first song.

In May 1964, she won the Bellaria Festival, with the song "Come puoi farlo tu", but it was with the song "Il magone" that she reached some media exposure and also with the song "Ed ora che abbiamo litigato", performed in 1965 at the variety show Teatro 10.

The numerous auditions made by Mimì Bertè in that period, in anticipation of an album, however, remained unreleased for almost thirty years: Carlo Alberto Rossi, hoping for her musical growth, pushed her to sign with a bigger record label, Durium, which in 1966 published her record Non sarà tardi / Quattro settimane, without, however, any success.

After her parents split, she moved to Rome with her mother and sisters, where she tried to emerge again by forming a trio together with her sister Loredana and her friend Renato Fiacchini (known as Renato Zero), also earning a living with a modest job at the union of singers and songwriters.

In 1969, she served four months in prison in Tempio Pausania for having been discovered in possession of a marijuana cigarette during an evening in a well-known nightclub in Sardinia, a crime that at the time did not make any distinction between the possession of soft drugs vs hard drugs, and therefore was strictly prosecutable. The singer was acquitted after a stint in prison, during which she attempted suicide. Consequently, the publication of her record Coriandoli spenti / L'argomento dell'amore was blocked, and the album, recorded a few months earlier for Esse Records, remained unreleased for over thirty years (today it is one of the rarest records in Italy).

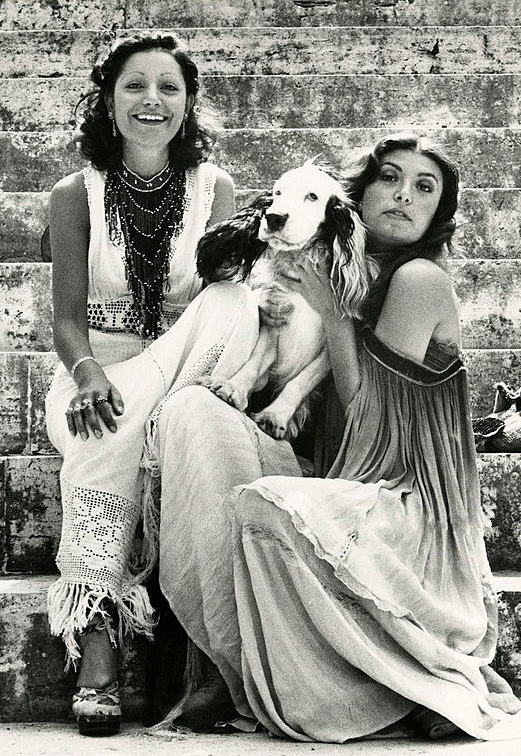
Mia Martini (left) with her sister Loredana Bertè

In 1970, she participated as a chorister, with her sister Loredana and alongside the musical group ″Cantori Moderni di Alessandroni″, to the album Per un pugno di samba, recorded during his stay in Rome by Chico Buarque de Hollanda, whom the singer will always be a great admirer. In the same year, the pianist Toto Torquati convinced Mimì to perform live, playing for her in a repertoire more appropriate to her voice.

=== 1970s ===
==== Success as Mia Martini ====
A meeting with lawyer and music producer Alberigo Crocetta proved decisive. Crocetta was the founder of the famous Piper Club, where many famous artists used to perform. He decided to launch Mimì Bertè, thinking also about the international music market and therefore creating her stage name "Mia Martini": Mia like Mia Farrow (her favourite actress), and Martini, chosen among three of the most famous Italian words abroad (spaghetti, pizza and Martini). Her look became more eclectic, characterised by numerous rings and a peculiar bowler hat.

In 1971, the record company RCA Italiana released "Padre davvero", the first song released as Mia Martini and recorded with the band La Macchina. The lyrics by Antonello De Sanctis deal with a generational conflict between a father and a daughter, and were immediately judged "irreverent" by radio and television censorship. Nevertheless, she won at the Festival di Musica d'Avanguardia e Nuove Tendenze in Viareggio. Another song of the album is "Amore.. amore.. un corno", a track written by a young Claudio Baglioni and Antonio Coggio. Baglioni wrote also "Gesù è mio fratello" and "Lacrime di marzo" for Martini's LP record Oltre la collina.

"The important thing is to put memories behind you. I did it with a record, titled Oltre la collina in which I practically put all of myself, all my past. In the song "Padre davvero" there is also my father, who left home one day, twenty years ago, and whom we have not seen since then. I accidentally learned that he lives in Milan and teaches in a high school. There is also my experience with the hippies in Ibiza, Spain and Kathmandu, Nepal, in the East. An adventurous, unpredictable, especially painful life."

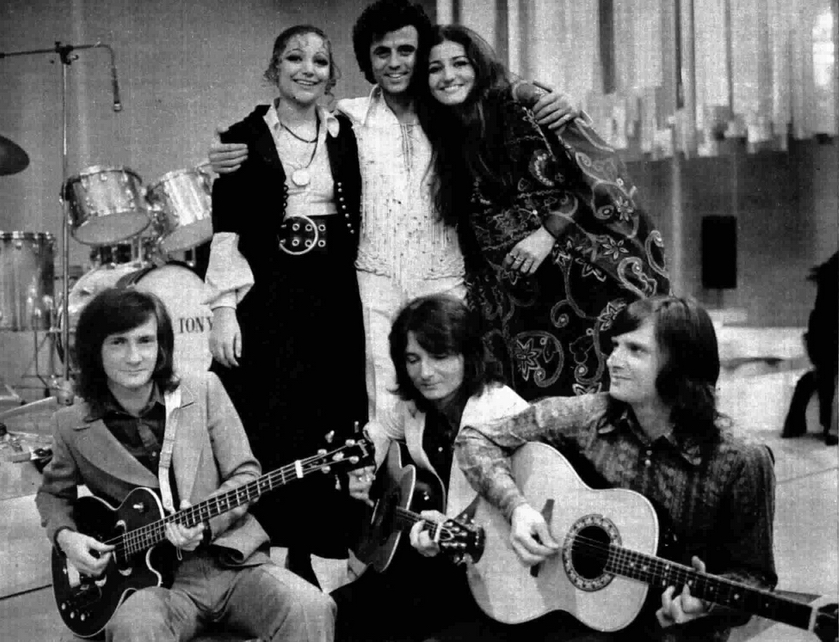
Mia Martini (left), Little Tony (center), Vena Veroutis (right) and the band Tin-Tin, in the variety show Stasera Little Tony (January 1972)

The album (the singer's first), released in November 1971, is considered one of the best works ever made by an Italian female artist, as well as one of her best works. Oltre la collina is also one of the first Italian concept albums, addressing young despair and loneliness, religion, illness and suicide. Martini also caught the attention of Lucio Battisti, who expressed his admiration for her unusual vocalism and asked her to be in his TV special Tutti insieme, in which she sang "Padre davvero" in its censored version.

In 1971, Martini was expected to perform at the TV show Canzonissima with the song "Cosa c'è di strano", but the song was released only in the summer of 1973 in a compilation by RCA Italiana. However, the compilation was immediately withdrawn from the market to prevent the Ricordi (new record company of the singer since February 1972) from reporting the label for breach of contract.

In 1972, the label company RCA tried to get Martini to perform at Sanremo Music Festival with the song "Credo", but she was not selected. Her album was released anyway, but in very few copies.

==== Hits: "Piccolo uomo" and "Minuetto" (1972–1973) ====
When her producer Alberigo Crocetta left the label company RCA to join the record company Ricordi in Milan, Martini followed him and recorded "Piccolo uomo". The track was written by Bruno Lauzi and Michelangelo La Bionda, with music by Dario Baldan Bembo, who was initially opposed to entrusting the track to a relatively new artist.

Destined, in fact, to the band I Camaleonti, the song was instead presented by Martini at the festival Pop, Beat, Western Express in London on 26 May 1972 and was played numerous times on the Italian radio show Alto gradimento. "Piccolo uomo" was proposed for the event Un disco per l'estate but was not selected. The single was also proposed to the summer song contests Cantagiro and Festivalbar, where Martini earned her first victory.

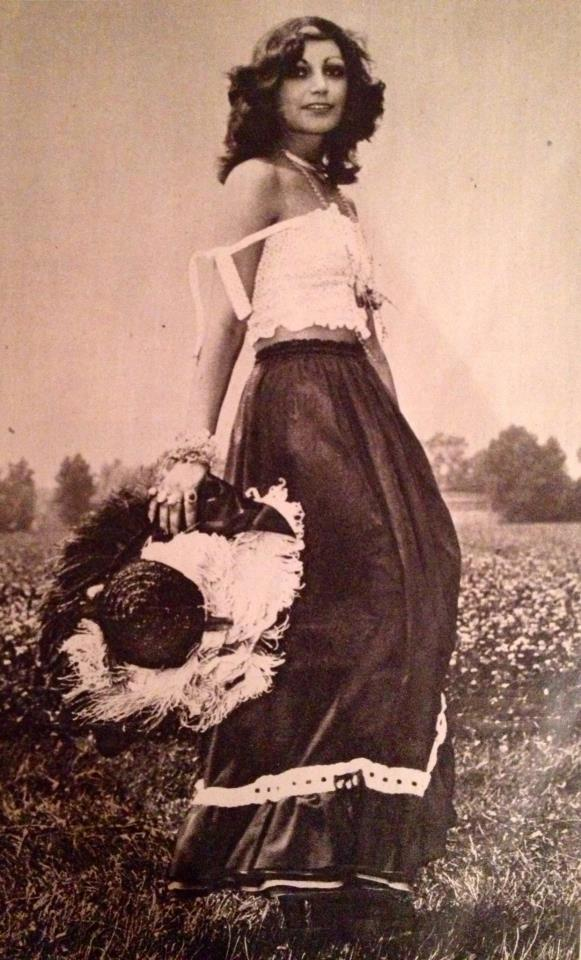
Mia Martini in 1973

Martini's success was immediate. She appeared on several television broadcasts, and the single reached the top positions of the hit parade and earned Martini her first Gold Record in sales.

In September, Martini also participated for the first time in the Mostra Internazionale di Musica Leggera in Venice with "Donna sola", a song with strong soul influences. The track was the most successful single of the event, with approximately 270,000 copies sold. The following year, Martini won the prestigious Gondola D'Oro. "Donna sola" reached the 2º place in the hit-parade of the best-selling singles during the month of November.

In October Martini released her second album, Nel mondo, una cosa which contained songs such as "Valsinha" by Vinícius de Moraes and Chico Buarque, "Amanti" by Maurizio Fabrizio, and the poignant covers "Madre" and "Io straniera", two pieces respectively by John Lennon and Elton John. The album reached the top of the charts with around 300,000 copies sold and received the Record Critics Award as the best LP of 1972.

At the beginning of 1973, Martini's hits "Piccolo uomo" and "Donna sola" were released in Germany. She appeared on television shows in European countries including France and Spain, and she was called by critics "the queen of youth music in Italy". The record label Ricordi proposed to Martini to perform at Sanremo Music Festival with the track "Vado via". She at first accepted, and then renounced in extremis, decreeing the fortune of Drupi, who had sung the audition of the song and he is invited to compete at Sanremo festival. On 2 April Mia Martini records "Minuetto", composed by Dario Baldan Bembo, with lyrics by Franco Califano.

The lyrics of "Minuetto" were written after attempts made by Maurizio Piccoli and Bruno Lauzi, who had tried in vain to make a convincing draft, and ultimately contacted Franco Califano. Baldan Bembo wrote the score, in which different musical atmospheres can be identified: from the classical citations of Bach to pop ballads from overseas. In the recording room for the choir, there are Bruno Lauzi, Maurizio Fabrizio, the band La Bionda, Loredana Bertè and Adriano Panatta (at the time in a relationship).

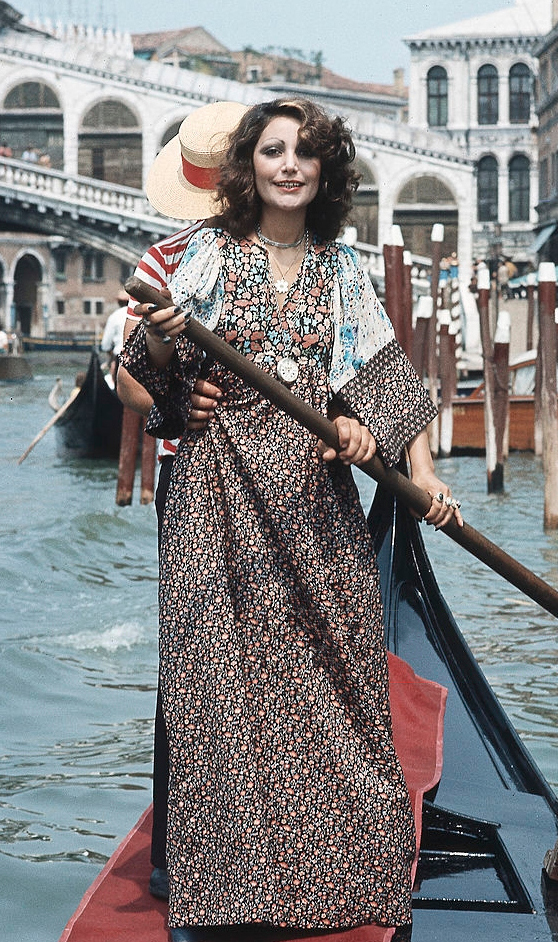
Mia Martini on gondola in Venice in September 1973

With "Minuetto", her best-selling song, Martini earned another Gold Record and a platinum record, as well as the victory at Festivalbar, her second victory in a row at the competition. The record remained in the top ten of the best-selling singles for 22 straight weeks, reaching the first position, and making it one of the most successful singles of 1973. In September, Martini again participated in the Mostra Internazionale di Musica Leggera in Venice, performing "Bolero" and "Il guerriero", two songs initially intended for her sister Loredana, who, however, sees fading the possibility of signing a recording deal with the label Ricordi, at first interested in the young starlet and "Mia Martini's sister". The release of this record with the tracks "Bolero" and "Il guerriero" was scheduled by October, but the record would never be released, probably due to a change of rules implemented by Gianni Ravera: in Venice it is no longer possible to compete with a single, but only with the entire LP. The singer therefore presented her new album, entitled Il giorno dopo, and will collect the Gondola d'Oro, won the year before with "Donna sola". In addition to the two songs presented in Venice, the new LP contains, among others the track "Ma quale amore", written by Antonello Venditti and Franca Evangelisti, "La malattia", on the then-unusual and much censored subject of drug addiction, and "Dove il cielo va a finire", written by Maurizio Fabrizio.

At the end of 1973, she became the female singer to have sold the most records throughout the year, along with Ornella Vanoni and Patty Pravo. During this time, an appearance on the TV show Canzonissima with the song "Adesso vai" was scheduled, but this track was recorded by Dori Ghezzi the following year.

==== Her European success (1974–1975) ====
In 1974, Martini was considered by European critics the singer of the year.

Her records were released in various countries of the world: she recorded her successes in French, German and Spanish. On 29 April she finished recording her album È proprio come vivere, which includes the song "Agapimu" ("My love"), whose lyrics are in Greek, written by herself, Gianni Conte and Dario Baldan Bembo.

The two songs chosen to promote the album, "Inno" (Maurizio Piccoli-Baldan Bembo) and "...E stelle stan piovendo" (Piccoli), became two of the major record hits of the summer of 1974. They were both released as A-sides of the same single, given that the two songs in the charts swapped positions week after week, despite the complex score of "Inno".

Also that year, Martini participated in the Festivalbar but as a guest: Vittorio Salvetti, patron of the popular event, asked her not to participate in the competition in order to avoid "burning the race", given her previous two consecutive victories. In September, she participated for the third time at Mostra Internazionale di Musica Leggera in Venice, where she performed for the first time "Inno" and "Agapimu".

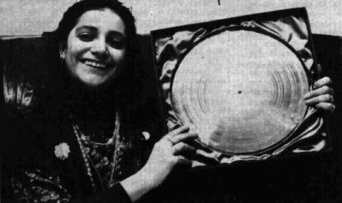
Mia Martini with a Gold Record for her first million of albums sold, 1974

È proprio come vivere became one of the most successful albums of 1974, reaching around 300,000 copies sold. In October, the singer received the Gold Record from the label Ricordi for her first million records sold with her last three albums.

At the end of the year, she recorded her first television special, entitled Mia, in which Lino Capolicchio and Gabriella Ferri take part. The program aired on 6 February 1975, at the same time as the launch of her new single "Al mondo".

In December, she presented, with Aldo Giuffrè and Peppino Gagliardi, the radio show Ciao domenica, aired between 1974 and 1975.

Martini received the European Critics Award in Palma de Mallorca for the song "Nevicate", a track in the LP Sensi e controsensi (1975), which also contains the track "Volesse il cielo" by Vinícius de Moraes, recorded live with an orchestra of sixty elements.

In the summer of 1975, she released a cover by Nicole Croisille titled "Donna con te" ("Une femme avec toi"), a summer success. She also participates in the Festivalbar.

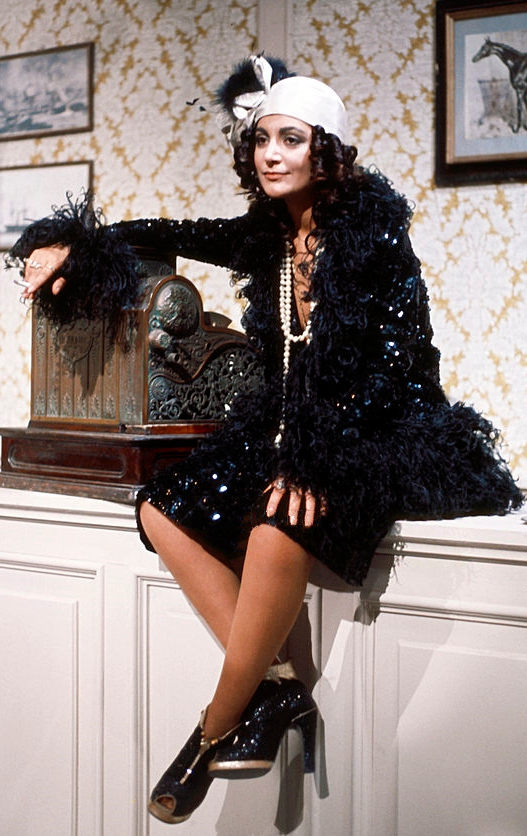
Mia Martini dons a 20s style dress on the show La compagnia stabile della canzone (September 1975)

Martini was proclaimed best female singer of the year through the referendum "Vota la voce", announced by the popular weekly TV Sorrisi e Canzoni, while in autumn she was one of the protagonists of La compagnia stabile della canzone, a variety show with Gino Paoli, Gigliola Cinquetti, Riccardo Cocciante and Gianni Nazzaro.

==== Problems with her record label (1975–1976) ====
Martini's success, however, caused her record label Ricordi to put pressure on her, forcing her to record songs of their choice. Martini saw this demand as a limitation to her artistic freedom, but being bound by a contract, the singer could not back down. When the label Ricordi expressly asked her for a new LP to be promoted in conjunction with her participation at the TV show Compagnia stabile della canzone, she complied reluctantly with the label's requests. Despite her conflict with Ricordi, the album she released, Un altro giorno con me, was among the best-selling of her career.

In 1976, the singer was once again convinced to participate in the Sanremo Festival with the song "L'amore è il mio orizzonte", but changed her mind again in extremis. In the month of March, the song was released without full promotion. It was her last official track with Ricordi, almost simultaneously released with the music compilation album Mia.

Later, the record company RCA, the Roman label that had launched her career five years earlier, proposed a contract to Martini that gave more freedom to choose her repertoire. Martini, whose tensions with her label had worsened and who had been considering a change of label for some time, withdrew early from her contract with Ricordi.

The move to RCA saw Mia Martini as the leading artist of the satellite label Come Il Vento. The new album Che vuoi che sia... se t'ho aspettato tanto included the track "Se mi sfiori", written by the newcomer Mango, the title-track "Io donna, io persona" and the song "Preghiera", written by Stefano Rosso, whose arrangements are composed by Luis Bacalov.

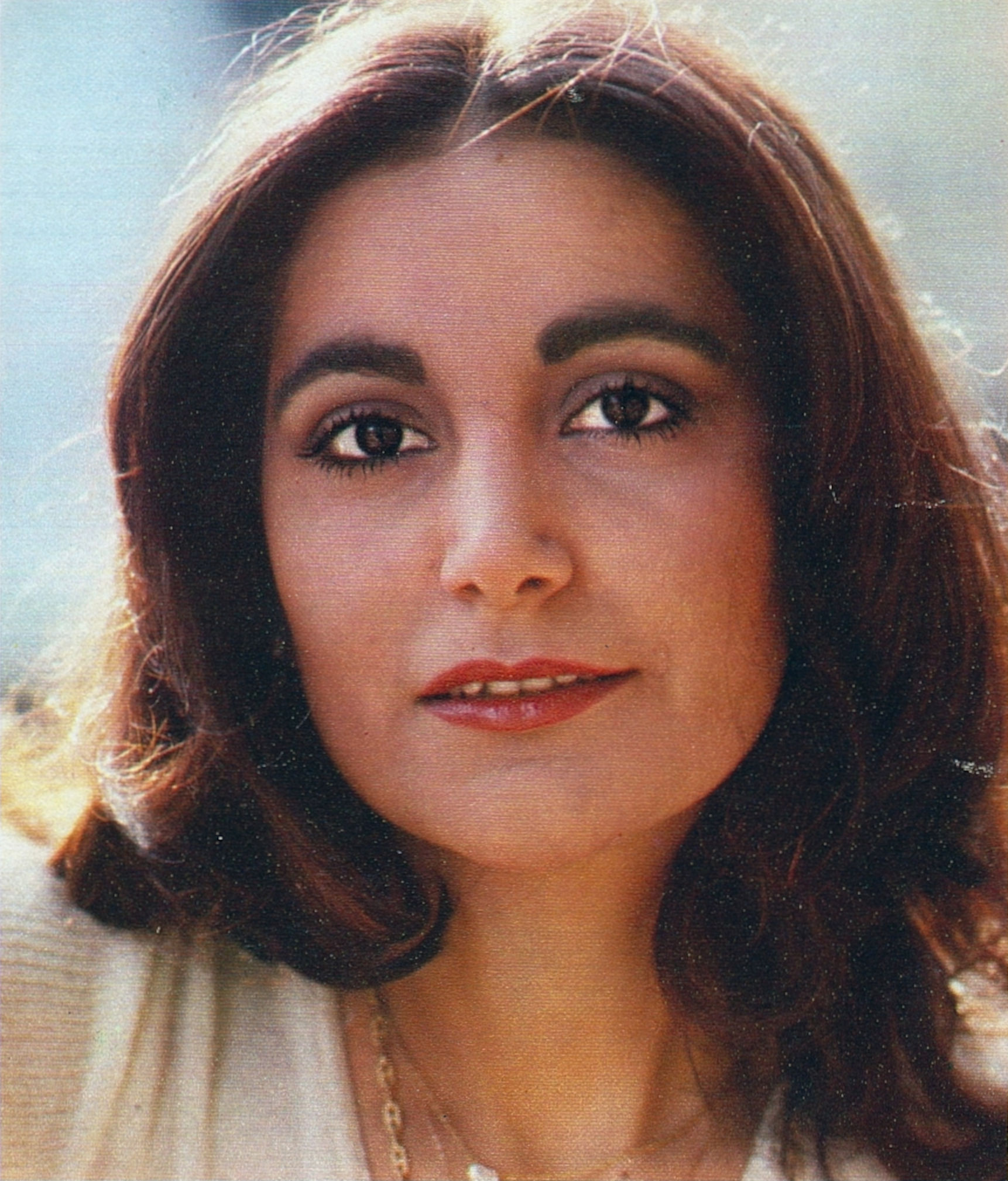
Mia Martini in 1975

For the launch of the album, the national TV Rai produced a special in colour with the same nam,e directed by Ruggero Miti, and broadcast an exclusive concert on the radio. In the summer, Martini performed on Italian and international stages, including Viareggio's Bussola and Sporting Club in Montecarlo.

Furthermore, with "Che vuoi che sia... se t'ho aspettato tanto", she performed again at Festivalbar and at the Mostra Internazionale di Musica Leggera in Venezia, presenting herself with an elaborate look: silver hairspray, royal makeup, and a sophisticated long red dress with a gold pattern. The year ended with the live recording of a special for French television in November and with her collaboration with Sergio Endrigo.

In the meantime, however, Martini was sued in court by the record label Ricordi for breach of contract. The record company requests and obtains not only the withdrawal from the market of her new LP (which was temporary), but also and above all the seizure of all the artist's assets and earnings, as well as the payment of a high penalty, for the amount of almost 90 million lire of the time.

==== Success at the Olympia with Aznavour and encounter with Fossati (1977–1979) ====
In a TV concert broadcast in France, Martini captured the attention of Charles Aznavour, who was struck by the intensity of her interpretative style. The French singer-songwriter asked her to join him for a duo show to perform in different theatres in Europe, starting at Teatro Sistina in Rome.

In 1977, Martini was chosen to represent Italy at the Eurovision Song Contest with "Libera", a track recorded in different languages, finishing 13th out of 18. The original song was a ballad but was later revamped before the contest to give it a more disco-influenced feel. Martini stated in later interviews that she didn't like the new version of the track and wanted to sing the original version of the song.

In the same year, she recorded one of her best-known interpretations, "Per amarti", written by Bruno Lauzi and Maurizio Fabrizio. She released the album with the same title Per amarti, in which she worked for the first time with songwriter Ivano Fossati, (who participates for the choirs of the song "Un uomo per me", cover of "Somebody to Love" by Queen and writes the lyrics of "Se finisse qui", cover of "Give a little bit" by Supertramp), beginning an artistic partnership and a sentimental relationship.

The album Per amarti also included the track "Ritratto di donna", with which Martini participated at the World Popular Song Festival in Tokyo in 1977, placing second and winning the Most Outstanding Performance Award (MOPA).

On 10 January 1978, together with Aznavour, she debuted successfully at the Olympia in Paris. However, after the month of reruns, Martini renounced the renewal of the contract to bring the recital to England, at the Royal Albert Hall in London, to stay with her new lover, Fossati. For this reason, her plans to record an entire album with Aznavour faded.

Her relationship with Fossati led Martini to choose only projects that interested her, regardless of potential prestige:

"Over the years I ended up being identified with the type of a sophisticated singer for selected people, who sang at Olympia and who seemed to snub the audience that had given her success, to seek who knows what higher goals .. This is not true at all..."

Meanwhile, Martini clashed with RCA, following strong quarrels due to the significant changes made to the text and arrangement of "Libera". The singer also said RCA was not committed to making the new LP that was destined for the British market, which was never completed. The following year, Martini publicly accused the label of having boycotted her work, limiting their distribution, and hindering her by creating a hostile environment.

Martini thus moved to Warner Bros. Records, the only record company willing to pay the artist's entire debt with RCA, following the anticipated breach of contract. In record time, the first single "Vola" (by Ivano Fossati) was recorded and released in July. "Vola" was the prelude to a second and much more important collaboration with Fossati, which will be developed with the album Danza, entirely written and produced for her by Fossati.

From this album, tracks like "La costruzione di un amore" and "Danza" remained in the artist's repertoire for a long time. But her relationship with Fossati soon becomes complicated, and a long-awaited collaboration with Pino Daniele that included the realisation of her next album faded. Martini recalled this period of her life in an interview:

"In the meantime, my relationship with Ivano Fossati had begun on a bloody and catastrophic basis. And I had my trouble to walk through this minefield. I had a deal with another record company, and I had to break it because of him. Because he was jealous, of executives, of musicians, of everyone. But most of all he was jealous of me as a singer. He said he wanted me as a woman, but it wasn't true because in fact he didn't even want a child with me, and the proof of love was to completely abandon even the very idea of singing and completely destroy Mia Martini. I was torn, I couldn't do it. The fact that there were all those debts to pay was my excuse for not quitting. But when he violently opposed to my upcoming collaboration with Pino Daniele, which I really cared about, for an album that I had to do, this fight between me as a woman and Mia Martini became a fierce thing. And in fact when I went to the recording room to record the album, without Pino Daniele, my voice went away. I found myself with my vocal cords imprisoned in a thick membrane made up of nodules. It seems to be a very rare thing. I underwent two surgeries. I was mute for a year. And I didn't know if I could return to sing. I started again, with difficulty..."

=== 1980s ===
"I was too willing for the job, I always had people around who praised me not for who I am, but for what I could give them. The music industry is a terrifying environment and I decided to stay out of it, to stay behind the scenes for three years. I became disenchanted. I know what type of corruption is behind the facade of an artist and I don't want to be involved anymore. I will continue to sing, but just step by step. In the entertainment world, everyone tries to crush you, to tarnish your dignity. And, in the end, we are the one who are responsible in front of the public, personally. [...] Dishonest music businessmen forced me to sing with cheap sound systems to save money; they forced me to perform under the threat of a penalty. And so I ended up under the knife twice. After the surgery, for three months I could not even speak. I underwent surgery and the doctors kept my mouth opened with a steel device that hurt my entire palate. It was a very painful time."

==== From singer to songwriter ====
In 1981, after a year of silence following two difficult surgeries at her vocal cords (which changed the sound of her voice in a more hoarse and less extended timbre), Martini decided to present herself as a songwriter and took on a more discreet and androgynous look, far from the eccentric one of the seventies.

She released, with the label DDD, the album Mimì: ten songs written by her and recorded in London and the US with arrangements by Dick Halligan. Among the tracks were the song "Del mio amore" and the two singles "E ancora canto" and "Ti regalo un sorriso", with which she competed at the Festivalbar in 1981. The album received favourable reception, despite difficulties and ostracism during radio and television promotion. Martini addressed this in various interviews:

"After the release of my album, I had to perform at Saint Vincent, but Gianni Ravera didn't want me there. I had to make a television special that RAI had assigned to me, but the official responsible for the program in the end denied it to me. A radio and television programmer, who is working on the realisation of a summer show for the network, has clearly told my record company that it is much better that I stay away from his crew, because I bring bad luck. Many thanks for this contribution to intelligence. But does this seem fair to you? At this point, I have also stopped hating them and stifling my anger and despairing."

In 1982, Martini competed for the first time at Sanremo Music Festival, where she sang a song written by Ivano Fossati, entitled "E non finisce mica il cielo". Despite not reaching the podium, she won the critics' prize, which was established specifically for her interpretation. After her death, the Critics award would be named in her memory "Mia Martini" Critics award.

The same year, she wrote Quante volte, a soft-funk track with music and arrangement by Shel Shapiro, producer of her new LP album Quante volte... ho contato le stelle. It exceeded 70,000 copies sold.

Initially, the single "Quante volte" was distributed in a few thousand copies, but after it became a hit, her record label DDD was quick to reissue it with a different cover. "Quante volte" also enters the German charts, and a German version was recorded, though it remains unpublished.

The album Quante volte contains other tracks written by Martini, like "Stelle" and "Bambolina" (released the year after as a single).

==== Withdrawal from the music scene ====
In 1983, Martini left the music scene. A growing smear campaign, started ten years earlier, linked her presence to negative events and identified her as a person bringing bad luck. In the music industry, even her name was forbidden to be uttered.

Martini said, years later, of this period of her life:

"My life became impossible. Whatever I did was destined to have no response and I had all the doors shut in my face. There were people who were afraid of me, who, for example, refused to participate at shows and events in which I should have taken part too. I remember that a manager begged me not to participate in a festival, because no record company would have sent their artists if I was there. This had gone to an absurd level, so I decided to withdraw.".

She said in an interview with the weekly magazine Epoca:

"I had the most bitter disappointment by Gianni Boncompagni, a friend precisely. Once I was a guest at Discoring, he was the director. As soon as I entered the studio I heard Boncompagni saying to the crew: guys, beware, from now on anything can happen, the microphones will blow, there will be a black out."

She also explained how the infamous story, which profoundly marked her artistic career and her personal life, began:

"It all started in 1970. Then I was beginning to have my first successes. Fausto Paddeu, a producer nicknamed 'Ciccio Piper' because he was often at the Piper Club (a famous disco club), offered me an exclusive contract for life. He was a totally unreliable type and I refused it. And after a few days, returning from a concert in Sicily, the van in which I was traveling with my band was involved in an accident. Two guys lost their lives. 'Ciccio Piper' immediately took the opportunity to stick the label of 'jinx' on me."

In 1982 Martini told journalist Gianfranco Moriondo:

"Among the first ones to say that I jinx, there were Patty Pravo and Fred Bongusto. Then it was the turn of RAI, which began to stop airing my songs. Then the record companies, who rejected my songs.".

Martini organised a farewell concert at the theatre Ciak in Milan, in which she records the album Miei compagni di viaggio: She recalled the most important stages of her musical growth through the reinterpretations of authors dear to her, including John Lennon, Kate Bush, Randy Newman, Vinícius de Moraes, Fabrizio De André, Francesco De Gregori and Luigi Tenco. To the choirs of "Big Yellow Taxi" by Joni Mitchell, there are her sister Loredana Bertè, her vocalist and friend Aida Cooper, Cristiano De André and Ivano Fossati. The concert ended with the song "Ed ora dico sul serio (...Non vorrei cantare più)" by Chico Buarque.

The following year, the record company DDD again attempted to revive Martini's career by trying to get her to participate in the Sanremo Music Festival with "Spaccami il cuore", a track written by Paolo Conte. The song, however, is discarded by the selection jury from entering the festival. Regarding this exclusion from the Sanremo Music Festival, in an interview on Radio Kiss Kiss in 1995, Martini said:

"I was rejected by the jury of the Festival and I was personally rejected by Red Ronnie, who decided that I was someone bringing bad luck, I was an outdated singer and that my song was very bad.".

Martini's contract with DDD was dissolved a few months later with the publication of the single, destined for the Sanremo Festival and released in a few thousand copies. The B-side of the single was a track Martini wrote called "Lucy", which in the refrain uses an ancient rhyme from Bagnara Calabra (her native hometown): a prayer not to hate one another and not to move away. The track "Spaccami il cuore", rejected at the Sanremo Festival in 1985, was later sung by Miriam Makeba, with the title "Don't Break My Heart".

Marginalised by the music sector and visibly tested also by the end of her relationship with Fossati, Martini retreated to the Umbrian countryside, renting a flat in the small village of Calvi dell'Umbria. To make up for the considerable economic problems caused by her debts from the disputes with her previous record labels, she continued to perform in small gigs in provincial towns.

==== Return to Sanremo ====
In 1989, the music producer Gianni Sanjust, who in the 1970s had previously taken care of Martini's artistic career at the label Ricordi, brought her back to the music stage. The relaunch was planned at Fonit Cetra, the only record label willing to offer Martini a contract. The project was entrusted to Lucio Salvini, one of Martini's producers in the 1970s.

Sanjust retrieved an old song, written for her by Bruno Lauzi and Maurizio Fabrizio in 1972: "Almeno tu nell'universo". The song was initially rejected to the contest, but due to the involvement of Alba Calia and Sandra Carraro (wife of the then Italian Minister of Tourism and Entertainment, Franco Carraro), the song was admitted to compete at the 39th Sanremo Festival. Martini's performance brought her newfound success with the public and critics, winning the Critics Award for a second time.

"For seven years I could no longer do my job, so I lived moments of great depression. And in that moment (at Sanremo), I felt "physically" this total embrace of the whole audience, I felt it right on the skin. And it was an unforgettable moment."

After her success at the Sanremo Music Festival, Martini soon went on tour and recorded a new LP album, called Martini Mia.... The album includes songs such as "Notturno", which over time became a classic, and "Donna", the last one written two years earlier by the Neapolitan singer-songwriter Enzo Gragnaniello. After having witnessed a live performance by Martini in the darkest period of her career, Gragnaniello paid homage to her by writing a song that became one of the most famous Italian songs explicitly focused on the theme of physical and psychological violence against women. This started a collaboration with her that would last for a few years.

In the summer of 1989, Martini sang "Donna" at Festivalbar, where she was awarded the Gold Disc for the 100,000 copies her album sold. In the autumn, she won the Targa Tenco as the best female interpreter of the year.

=== 1990s ===
==== New successes at Sanremo, Neapolitan song hit and Eurovision ====
In 1990, Mia Martini competed again at Sanremo Music Festival with the track "La nevicata del '56", winning the Critics Award for the third time.

The song "La nevicata del '56" was included in the album La mia razza, a work in which Martini ranges from melodic sound ("Un altro Atlantico", "Stringi di più", "Cercando il sole"), to ethnic rhythms ("Danza pagana", "Va' a Marechiaro") and Latin sound (Chica chica bum by Carmen Miranda).

In the same year, she sang the duet "Stelle di stelle" with Claudio Baglioni, two decades after their first collaboration.

In 1991, Martini published "Mi basta solo che sia un amore", a compilation album of her best-known love songs, plus the unreleased track "Scrupoli", which became the theme song of the homonymous television program. In the same year, she held twelve concerts in which she re-proposed pieces from her own repertoire and from other songwriters in a jazz version ("Vola", "Pensieri e parole" by Battisti, "Gente distratta" by Pino Daniele and other classic songs).

At the end of 1991, Martini collaborated with Roberto Murolo in the duet "Cu' mme", written by Enzo Gragnaniello, which became a hit.

In 1992, she competed for the fourth time at the Sanremo Music Festival with the song "Gli uomini non cambiano". Despite being the favourite for the win by the press, she was awarded second place, behind Luca Barbarossa with the song "Portami a ballare". Her new album Lacrime, released after the competition, achieved a gold record, also entering the German charts. For the album, Martini collaborated with a young Biagio Antonacci on the song "Il fiume dei profumi", with Mimmo Cavallo for the songs "Dio c'è" and "Il mio Oriente", with Enzo Gragnaniello for the song "Scenne l'argento" and with other songwriters.

Her second-place finish at the Sanremo Festival allowed her to represent Italy again at the Eurovision Song Contest, held in Sweden. She presented a song titled "Rapsodia", which was included in the homonymous compilation Rapsodia - Il meglio di Mia Martini, with her best-known songs in a remastered version, together with two live tracks recorded during the tour Per aspera ad Astra. Also planned was the release of a home video of her tour, which would be published posthumously by her new record label Polygram.

In April 1992, Martini reconnected with her estranged sister Loredana Bertè after almost ten years of silence; the two women had not spoken to each other since 1983.

In May 1992, Martini competed at Eurovision with "Rapsodia", placing 4th. At first, she appeared in Swedish media press primarily for being "the sister-in-law of Björn Borg", the former Swedish tennis player that Loredana Bertè had married. But after the competition, she received the praise of the Swedish public, appearing far from the temperament of her sister Loredana.

Loredana had in the meantime severed her relationship with Björn Borg, whom she married in 1989, and prepared to return as a singer-songwriter. Martini agreed to duet with her on the song "Stiamo come stiamo", at Sanremo Music Festival in 1993. But the event did not convince the juries, in part due to the tensions between the two sisters during the days of the music festival.

==== Disagreement with her record company and last album ====
Later, her record company Polygram forced her to participate in the selection process for the Sanremo Music Festival of 1994. The track was rejected, and Martini was not convinced by the song.

The news aroused an uproar, and singer Claudia Mori offered Martini to replace her in the competition. Martini declined the offer, which was not allowed under the regulations of the Sanremo Festival.

In 1994, Martini moved to a new record company, RTI Music, with which she completed recording her new album started with the previous label, where the singer had some disagreements. The album, her last one, was titled La musica che mi gira intorno, in which she reinterpreted songs by her favorite authors, who wrote those tracks "in a moment of great love, or great frailty": among them "Hotel Supramonte" and "Fiume Sand Creek" by Fabrizio De André, "Mimì sarà" by Francesco De Gregori, "Dillo alla luna" by Vasco Rossi, "Tutto sbagliato baby" by Eugenio and Edoardo Bennato, "La musica che gira intorno" by Ivano Fossati and the unreleased song "Viva l'amore" by Mimmo Cavallo.

The album was the first of a series of projects based on the reinterpretation of various authors and musical genres, which the artist did not have time to work on: from the Neapolitan classics to the more modern ones by Pino Daniele and tributes to Tom Waits and Billie Holiday.

In March 1995, two months before her death, Martini announced to her fan club Chez Mimì plans for a new album entirely dedicated to the moon and in 1996, it was planned a duet with the singer Mina. Mina, a few months after Martini's death, was the first singer to dedicate a recording tribute to her in her album Pappa di latte, which included a personal cover of the song Almeno tu nell'universo.

==== Death ====
Martini suffered for some years from painful fibroids, for which she did not want to undergo surgery, fearing a possible change to her vocal timbre. For this reason, she took prescription medication, which was considered excessive by family, friends and colleagues.

A few days before her death, busy with the first concerts of her new tour, the singer was rushed to the hospital twice, both in Acireale and in Bari, due to pain in the stomach and left arm. These symptoms, however, were ignored by her entourage.

At the end of a concert, Martini decided to rest and travelled to Cardano al Campo, Varese, where she had rented a small apartment near her father's house as their relationship had improved over the years. She died there on 12 May 1995.

On 14 May 1995, after a few days of being unreachable, Martini's manager requested police intervention, and firefighters broke into her apartment. The singer's body was found lying on the bed, in pyjamas, with the headphones of a portable cassette player on her ears and with her arm stretched out towards a nearby telephone, with an address book open on the floor.

The Public Prosecutor's Office opened an investigation and ordered the autopsy. According to the coroner's report, her death was by cardiac arrest due to drug overdose; traces of cocaine were found in her body.

Interviewed for the television special La Storia siamo noi, aired ten years after the artist's death, Martini's sister Olivia said she was the last one to hear her sister on the phone, a few days before she was found: Martini had told her that she felt very tired from the last concerts, also telling her not to worry if she did not answer the phone, because she was busy with the preparation of the song to be performed at the TV show Viva Napoli.

Martini's funeral took place on 16 May in the church of San Giuseppe in Busto Arsizio, attended by about four thousand people. Her coffin was covered with a flag of Napoli, the football team she supported. After the funeral, her body was cremated, complying with the will of her father, and her ashes were buried in the cemetery of Cavaria con Premezzo.

In May 2009 Loredana Bertè, in an interview to the magazine Musica leggera, returned to talk about her sister's death, casting a shadow on the role of the father in the affair. A year later, during the TV show Top Secret on 10 June 2010, Loredana Bertè again accused her father of having used violence against his first wife and daughters during childhood; accusations confirmed by her sister Leda, but above all by denouncing that she saw her sister's body covered with bruises and that her body was cremated too soon after death.

== Tributes ==
=== Biopic ===
In 2019, a biopic of Martini titled Io sono Mia was released. The film was directed by Riccardo Donna and stars Serena Rossi as Mia Martini. The film narrates Martini's life, including her artistic career, her tumultuous relationships with her family, her sister Loredana and the discrimination she endured by the music system and her colleagues.

The film begins in 1989 in Sanremo, with flashbacks that narrate some events in Martini's life, told during an interview granted to a journalist by Martini herself, a few hours before her participation at the Sanremo Music Festival in 1989.

The movie details her early start in the music industry, her success in the 1970s and her withdrawal from the music sector: a dramatic period of slander launched in the late 1970s by a producer with whom the singer refused to work and who accuses Mia of bringing bad luck. Ostracised by the music industry, Martini "goes away from everybody", moving to the countryside and struggling to make a living. The movie also tells the story of the troubled love relationship with the Milanese photographer Andrea (inspired by songwriter Ivano Fossati, who did not want to be mentioned in the film), with whom she falls in love. The film also evokes in the character of Anthony the singer Renato Zero, who also did not want to be mentioned in the movie.

== Awards ==
- 1964: Winner of "Festival di Bellaria" with Il magone
- 1971: Winner "Festival di Musica d'Avanguardia e Nuove Tendenze" Viareggio with Padre davvero
- 1972: Discography award "Premio della critica discografica" for album Nel mondo, una cosa
- 1972: Winner Festivalbar 1972 with Piccolo uomo
- 1972: Gold Record Piccolo uomo
- 1972: Winner Mostra Internazionale di Musica Leggera in Venice with Donna sola
- 1973: Winner Festivalbar 1973 with Minuetto
- 1973: Gold Record for Minuetto
- 1974: Gold record for over 1 million sales
- 1975: Critics Award "Premio della Critica di Palma de Mallorca" with Nevicate
- 1975: "Premio de Il canzoniere dell'estate" as best singer of the year
- 1975: Telegatto as best female singer of the year
- 1977: Winner of the Most Outstanding Performance Award at the "World Song Popular Festival Yamaha in Tokyo" with Ritratto di donna
- 1982: Critics Award at Sanremo Music Festival with E non finisce mica il cielo
- 1989: Targa Tenco as best performing artist
- 1989: Critics Award at Sanremo Music Festival with Almeno tu nell'universo
- 1989: Telegatto as best female singer of the year
- 1989: Gold Record for Martini Mia...
- 1990: Critics Award at Sanremo Music Festival with La nevicata del '56
- 1992: Second Place at Sanremo Music Festival
- 1992: Gold Record for Lacrime

== Discography ==
=== As Mimì Bertè ===
==== Singles ====
- "I miei baci non puoi scordare" / "Lontani dal resto del mondo" (1963)
- "Insieme" / "Let me tell you" (1963)
- "Il magone" / "Se mi gira l'elica" (1964)
- "Ed ora che abbiamo litigato" / "Non pentirti dopo" (1964)
- "Non sarà tardi" / "Quattro settimane" (1966)
- "Coriandoli spenti" / "L'argomento dell'amore" (1969; Withdrawn single, released in 2000 as part of compilation Mia... Mimì)

=== As Mia Martini ===
==== Singles ====
- "Padre davvero..." / "Amore... amore... un corno!" (1971)
- "Gesù è mio fratello" / "Lacrime di marzo" (1971)
- "Credo" / "Ossessioni" (1972)
- "Piccolo uomo" / "Madre" (1972)
- "Donna sola" / "Questo amore vero" (1972)
- "Minuetto" / "Tu sei così" (1973)
- "Il guerriero" / "Bolero" (1973, release cancelled)
- "Inno" / "...E stelle stan piovendo" (1974)
- "Al mondo" / "Principessa di turno" (1975)
- "Donna con te" / "Tutti uguali" (1975)
- "L'amore è il mio orizzonte" / "Sabato" (1976)
- "Che vuoi che sia... se t'ho aspettato tanto" / "Io donna, io persona" (1976)
- "Libera" / "Sognare è vita" (1977)
- "Per amarti" / "Se finisse qui" (1977)
- "Vola" / "Dimmi" (1978)
- "Danza" / "Canto alla luna" (1979)
- "Ti regalo un sorriso" / "Ancora grande" (1981)
- "E ancora canto" / "Stai con me" (1981)
- "E non finisce mica il cielo" / "Voglio te" (1982)
- "Quante volte" / "Solo noi" (1982, two editions)
- "Bambolina" / "Guarirò guarirò" (1982)
- "Spaccami il cuore" / "Lucy" (1985)
- "Almeno tu nell'universo" / "Spegni la testa" (1989)
- "La nevicata del '56" / "Danza pagana" (1990)
- "Chica chica bum (remix)" / "Chica chica bum (instrumental)" (1990, release cancelled)
- "Stiamo come stiamo" (with Loredana Bertè) / "Dormitorio pubblico" (L. Bertè) (1993)

==== Albums ====
- Oltre la collina (1971)
- Nel mondo, una cosa (1972)
- Il giorno dopo (1973)
- È proprio come vivere (1974)
- Sensi e controsensi (1975)
- Un altro giorno con me (1975)
- Che vuoi che sia... se t'ho aspettato tanto (1976)
- Per amarti (1977)
- Danza (1978)
- Mimì (1981)
- Quante volte... ho contato le stelle (1982)
- Miei compagni di viaggio (1983)
- Martini Mia (1989)
- La mia razza (1990)
- Mi basta solo che sia un amore (1991)
- Mia Martini in concerto (da un'idea di Maurizio Giammarco) (1991)
- Lacrime (1992)
- Rapsodia Il meglio di Mia Martini (1992)
- La musica che mi gira intorno (1994)

==== Compilations ====
- Mia (1976)
- Il meglio di Mia Martini (1984)
- Ti regalo un sorriso (1985)
- Mia Martini 1996 (1996)
- Mia Martini – Le origini (1996)
- Mimì Bertè (1996, including previously unreleased tracks)
- Indimenticabile Mia (1996, including previously unreleased tracks)
- Mi canto español (1997, including previously unreleased tracks)
- Gli anni '70 (1998)
- Semplicemente Mimì (1998, including previously unreleased tracks)
- Sorelle (1999, including previously unreleased tracks)
- I Miti Musica – Mia Martini (1999)
- Mia... Mimì (2000, including previously unreleased tracks)
- Mimì Sarà (2000, including previously unreleased tracks)
- Dolce amare (2000)
- Canzoni segrete (2003, including previously unreleased tracks and alternate versions)
- Per sempre (2003)
- E parlo ancora di te (2004, including previously unreleased tracks and alternate versions)
- La neve, il cielo, l'immenso (3-CD box set, 2005; including previously unreleased tracks, alternative versions and songs previously unavailable on CD)
- Liberamente Mia (2007)
- Altro che cielo (2010)
- Mia Martini (2011)
- Sorelle (2012)
- La vita é cosí (2017)

==== DVD ====
- In Concerto (in concert 1982, recorded for Italian language Swiss television; also released on VHS)
- E ancora canto
- Per aspera ad astra (also released on VHS)

Preceded by Al Bano and Romina Power with "We'll Live It All Again"	Italy in the Eurovision Song Contest; 1977	Succeeded by Ricchi e Poveri with "Questo amore"
Preceded by Peppino di Capri with "Comme è ddoce 'o mare"	Italy in the Eurovision Song Contest; 1992	Succeeded by Enrico Ruggeri with "Sole d'Europa"
