= Bruno Lauzi =

Italian recording artist, singer, songwriter

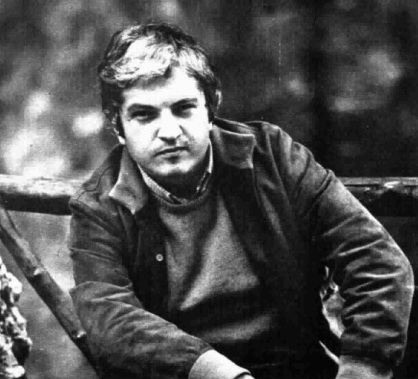
- Lauzi in 1975
- Born: 8 August 1937; Asmara, Italian East Africa (now Eritrea)
- Died: 24 October 2006 (aged 69); Peschiera Borromeo, Italy
- Occupations: Singer; songwriter; poet; politician; actor; screenwriter; cabaret performer

Bruno Lauzi (Italian pronunciation: [ˈbruːno ˈlauttsi]; 8 August 1937 – 24 October 2006) was an Italian singer-songwriter, poet and writer.

== Biography ==
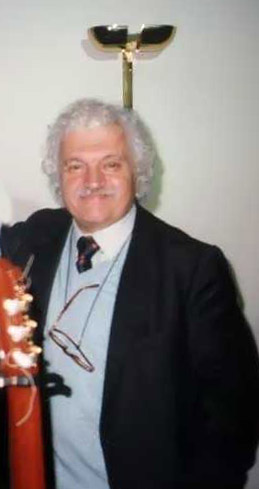
Lauzi in 1993

Bruno Lauzi was born in Asmara, then part of the Italian East Africa, to a Catholic father, Francesco Lauzi, and a Jewish mother, Laura Nahum. In the 1960s, he moved to Genoa, where he became part of the local music scene and met Gino Paoli, Luigi Tenco and Fabrizio De André. After a spell as song writer for Mia Martini, Georges Moustaki and Ornella Vanoni, Lauzi established himself as a renowned cantautore (singer-songwriter).

His biggest hits include "Ritornerai" (1963), "Amore caro amore bello" (1972), "Onda su onda" (1974), and "Genova per noi" (1975).

Lauzi's 1969 hit song Arrivano i cinesi (the Chinese are coming) used anti-Chinese racism to criticize Italians who drew political inspiration from the Maoist model, describing them as "getting all yellow," and singing that they would soon turn "small, fast, and mute" if they kept obsessing over their "special book" (Quotations by Chairman Mao Zedong). The album cover for Arrivano i cinesi featured a slant-eyed lemon wearing a Chinese scholar's cap.

In the 1980s, he started a political career with the Italian Liberal Party, but without huge success.

Suffering from Parkinson disease, he died in Peschiera Borromeo at age 69 from liver cancer.

He was a football supporter of U.C. Sampdoria.

== Discography ==
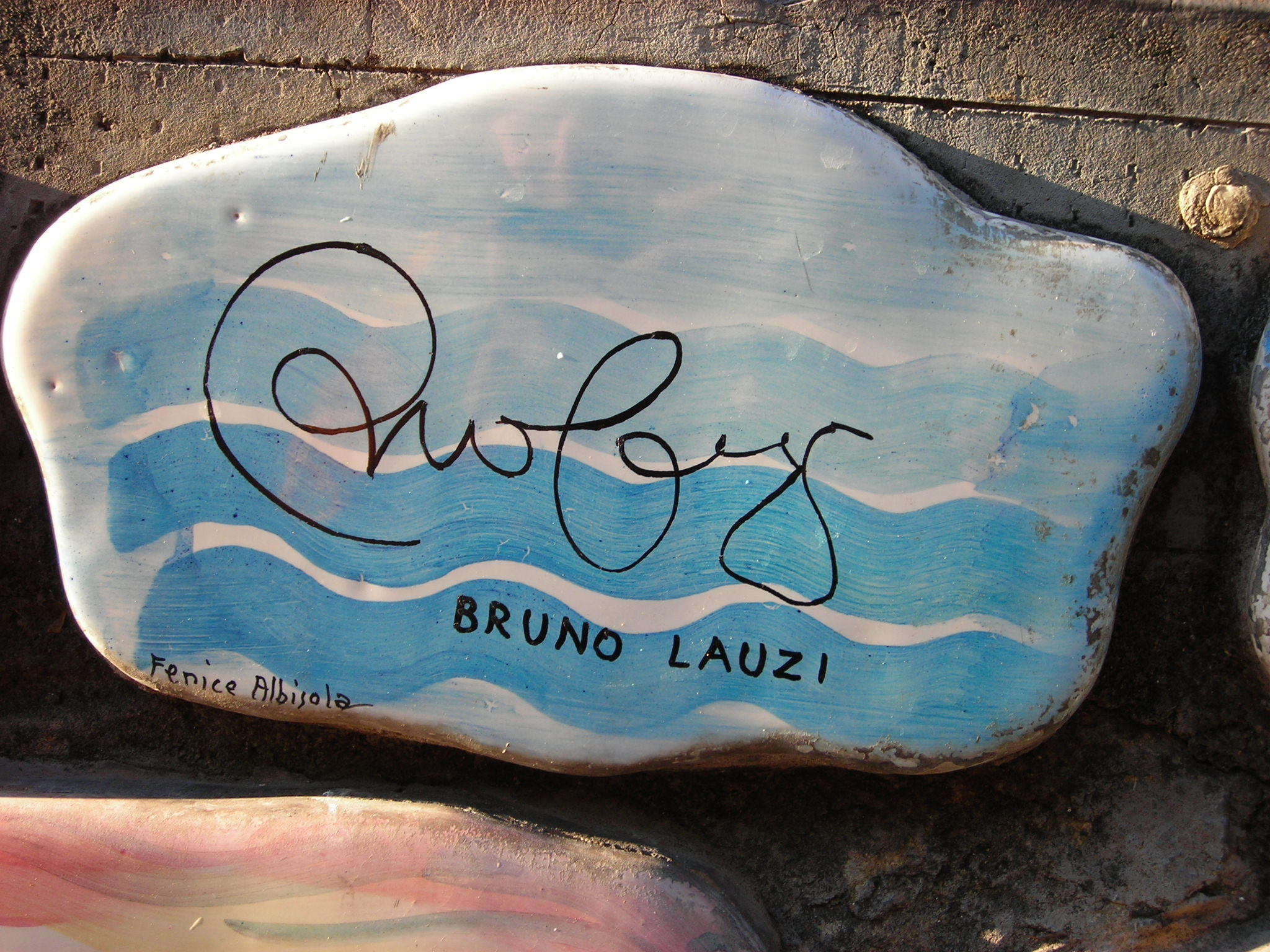
Lauzi's tile on the Muretto di Alassio

- Lauzi al cabaret (1965)
- Ti ruberò (1965)
- Cara (1968)
- Bruno Lauzi (1970)
- Amore caro amore bello (1971)
- Il teatro di Bruno Lauzi (1972)
- Simon (1973)
- Lauzi oggi (1974)
- L'amore sempre (1975)
- Quella gente là (1975)
- Genova per noi (1975)
- Johnny Bassotto, la tartaruga...ed altre storie (1976)
- Persone (1977)
- Alla grande (1978)
- Amici miei (1981, Q-disc)
- Palla al centro (1982)
- Piccolo grande uomo (1985)
- Back to Jazz (1985)
- Ora! (1987)
- La musica del mondo (1988)
- Inventario latino (1989)
- Il dorso della balena (1992)
- Johnny Bassotto e i suoi amici (1996)
- Omaggio alla città di Genova (2001)
- Il manuale del piccolo esploratore (2003)
- Nostaljazz (2003)
- Ciocco Latino (2006)

== Literary works ==
=== Poems ===
- I mari interni ("Internal Seas", 1994)
- Riapprodi ("Re-Docks", 1994)
- Versi facili ("Easy Verses", 1999)
- Esercizi di sguardo ("Exercises of Glance", 2002)
- Agli immobili cieli ("To the Still Skies", 2010)

=== Prose work ===
- Della quieta follia dei piemontesi ("On the Quiet Foolery of the Piedmonteses", 1997)
- Il caso del pompelmo levigato ("The Case of Polished Grapefruit", 2005)
- Tanto domani mi sveglio. Autobiografia in controcanto ("So Tomorrow I Wake Up. Autobiography in Counterpoint", 2006)
