= Maurizio Fabrizio =

Italian composer and singer-songwriter

- Born: 16 March 1952 (age 74); Milan, Italy
- Website: www.mauriziofabrizio.it

Maurizio Fabrizio (born 16 March 1952) is an Italian composer, conductor, arranger, producer, musician and singer-songwriter.

== Life and career ==
Born in Milan, after studying at the conservatory in 1969 Fabrizio became a member of the La Scala orchestra as a percussionist under the direction of Claudio Abbado. In 1970 he formed a musical duo with his brother Popi, Maurizio e Fabrizio, recording several singles and entering the main competition at the 21st edition of the Sanremo Music Festival.

In 1972 he started a long and fruitful collaboration as arranger and producer with Angelo Branduardi, and also began collaborating as composer and arranger with other artists including Ornella Vanoni, Patty Pravo and Mia Martini. After recording some solo albums between 1975 and 1980, starting from the early 1980s Fabrizio devoted himself to composing, often teaming with lyricist Guido Morra.

His collaborations include Eros Ramazzotti, Renato Zero, Riccardo Fogli, Miguel Bosé, Antonello Venditti, Mina, Giorgia, Toquinho, Albano Carrisi, Eduardo De Crescenzo, Donatella Rettore, Rossana Casale, Alexia and Mietta.

Fabrizio also composed music for several stage musicals.

== Discography ==
Albums

- 1970 - Come il vento (as Maurizio e Fabrizio)
- 1975 - Azzurri orizzonti
- 1978 - Movimenti nel cielo
- 1979 - Primo
- 1980 - Personaggi
- 2011 - Bella la vita
- 2013 - L'arte dell'incontro (with Katia Astarita)
