= Eros Ramazzotti discography =

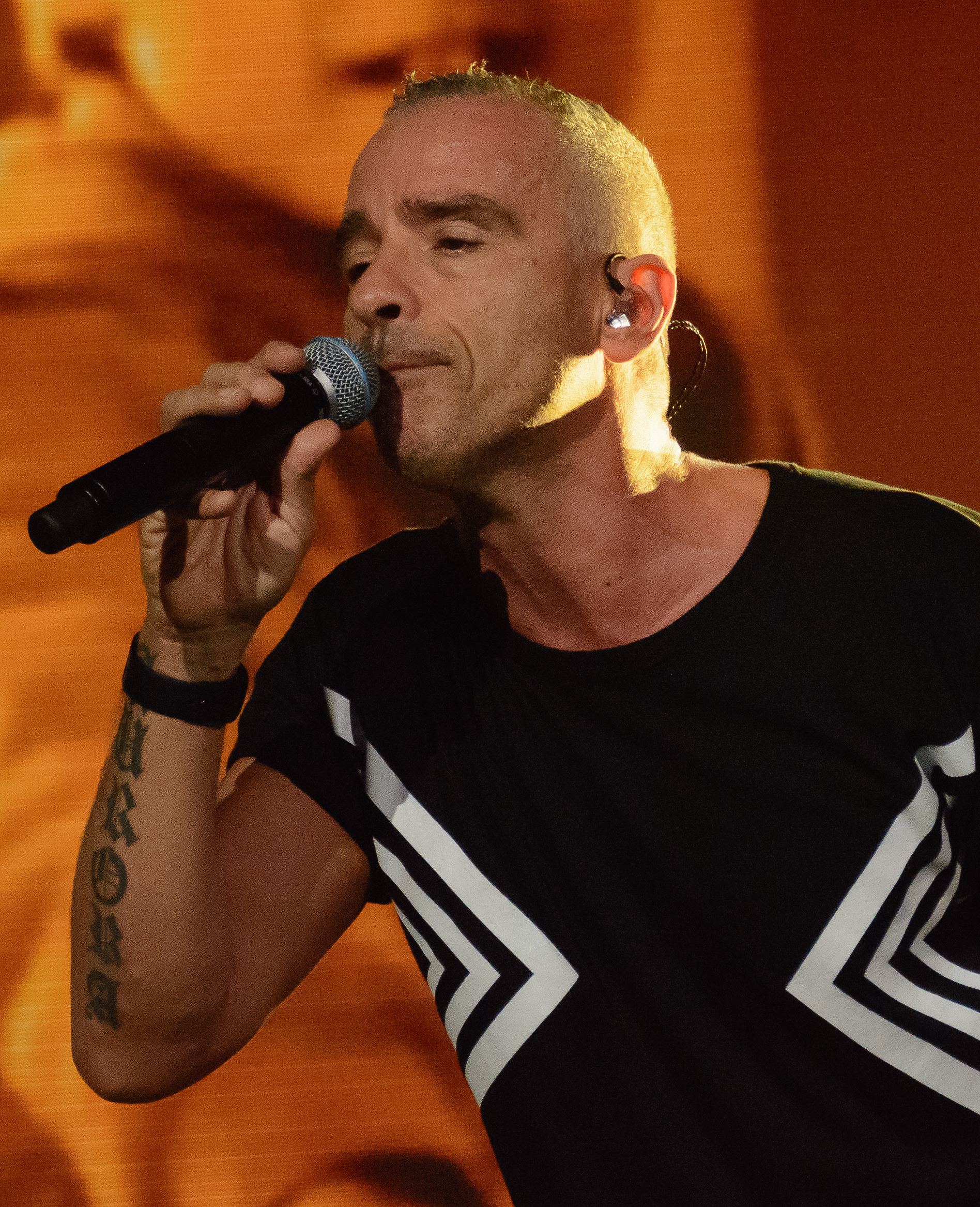
- Studio albums: 16
- Extended plays: 1
- Live albums: 3
- Compilation albums: 7
- Singles: 37
- Video albums: 5
- Music videos: 96

This is the discography of Italian singer Eros Ramazzotti. Since 1984, Ramazzotti has released 16 studio albums (including one also classified as an EP), seven compilation albums, three live albums as well as 37 singles, all of which have charted noticeably high in many European countries as well as in South and Central America. Ramazzotti has sold over 60 million records in his 30 years of career. The Italian star has done duets with several prestigious artists such as Cher, Tina Turner, Andrea Bocelli, Patsy Kensit, Anastacia, Joe Cocker, Luciano Pavarotti, Laura Pausini, and Ricky Martin.

== Albums ==
=== Studio albums ===
List of studio albums, with selected details, chart positions, sales, and certifications
Title	Album details	Peak chart positions										Sales	Certifications
Title	Album details	ITA FIMI	ITA M&D	AUT	BEL (FL)	BEL (WA)	SPA	FRA	GER	SWI	US Latin	Sales	Certifications
Cuori agitati	Released: 1985; Label: DDD; Formats: CD, LP, cassette	48^{[A]}	10	—	—	—	—	—	—	5	—	ITA: 500,000; FRA: 450,000; WW: 1,200,000	AUT: Gold; SWI: Gold
Nuovi eroi / Héroes de hoy	Released: 14 July 1986; Label: DDD; Formats: CD, LP, cassette	—	1	1	—	—	—	—	38	1	—	ITA: 1,300,000	AFI: 2× Platinum; AUT: 2× Platinum; BVMI: Gold; PROMUSICAE: Gold; IFPI SWI: 2× Platinum
In certi momenti / En ciertos momentos	Released: 2 November 1987; Label: DDD; Formats: CD, LP, cassette	—	1	5	—	—	—	—	17	3	—	ITA: 950,000; WW: 2,000,000	BVMI: Gold; PROMUSICAE: 2× Platinum; IFPI SWI: Platinum
In ogni senso / En todos los sentidos	Released: 9 April 1990; Label: DDD; Formats: CD, LP, cassette	—	1	5	—	—	3	17	2	1	—	ITA: 1,100,000; WW: 3,200,000	BVMI: Platinum; IFPI AUT: Gold; PROMUSICAE: 2× Platinum; IFPI SWI: 3× Platinum; SNEP: Gold
Tutte storie / Todo historias	Released: 19 April 1993; Label: DDD; Formats: CD, LP, cassette	—	1	1	—	—	1	16	3	1	—	ITA: 1,000,000; WW: 4,500,000	BVMI: Platinum; IFPI AUT: Platinum; PROMUSICAE: 2× Platinum; IFPI SWE: Platinum; IFPI SWI: 4× Platinum; SNEP: 2× Gold; RIAA: 2× Platinum (Latin)
Dove c'è musica / Donde hay música	Released: 13 May 1996; Label: DDD; Formats: CD, cassette	1	1	1	1	1	2	4	1	1	20	ITA: 1,500,000; FIN: 41,025; FRA: 400,000; GER: 1,500,000; WW: 5,000,000	BVMI: 3× Gold; IFPI AUT: 3× Platinum; IFPI FIN: Platinum; IFPI SWE: Platinum; IFPI SWI: 4× Platinum; SNEP: 2× Platinum; PROMUSICAE: 2× Platinum; RIAA: 2× Platinum (Latin)
Stilelibero / Estilo libre	Released: 30 October 2000; Label: Ariola; Formats: CD, cassette	2	1	3	6	1	3	3	2	1	11	ITA: 900,000; FIN: 25,769	FIMI: 9× Platinum; BEA: Platinum; BVMI: 2× Platinum; IFPI AUT: Platinum; IFPI FIN: Gold; IFPI SWE: Gold; IFPI SWI: 4× Platinum; PROMUSICAE: Platinum; SNEP: Platinum; RIAA: Platinum (Latin)
9	Released: 3 June 2003; Label: Ariola; Formats: CD, cassette	1	1	2	6	3	5	5	2	1	30	ITA: 500,000	FIMI: 5× Platinum; BEA: Gold; BVMI: Platinum; IFPI AUT: Gold; IFPI SWI: 3× Platinum; PROMUSICAE: Gold; SNEP: 2× Gold
Calma apparente / Calma aparente	Released: 28 October 2005; Label: Ariola; Formats: CD, cassette	1	1	2	12	3	4	5	4	1	—	ITA: 1,200,000	FIMI: 3× Diamond; BEA: Gold; BVMI: Platinum; IFPI AUT: Platinum; PROMUSICAE: Gold; SNEP: Gold; IFPI SWI: 2× Platinum
Ali e radici / Alas y raíces	Released: 26 May 2009; Label: RCA; Formats: CD, Download	1	1	2	6	3	2	5	4	1	52		FIMI: 5× Platinum; BEA: Gold; BVMI: Gold; IFPI AUT: Gold; IFPI SWE: Gold; IFPI SWI: Platinum; PROMUSICAE: Gold
Noi / Somos	Released: 13 November 2012; Label: Universal; Formats: CD, Download	1	1	2	3	3	6	22	7	2	40		FIMI: 5× Platinum; BEA: Gold; BVMI: Gold; IFPI AUT: Gold; IFPI SWI: Gold; PROMUSICAE: Gold
Perfetto / Perfecto	Released: 12 May 2015; Label: Universal; Formats: CD, Download	1	1	5	3	2	3	16	5	2	—		FIMI: Platinum; BEA: Gold; IFPI AUT: Gold; IFPI SWI: Gold
Vita ce n'è / Hay Vida	Released: 23 November 2018; Label: Universal; Formats: CD, download	1	—N/a	1	12	6	6	45	7	1	—		FIMI: Platinum
Battito Infinito / Latido Infinito	Released: 16 September 2022; Label: Universal; Formats: CD, download	2	—N/a	4	5	3	8	39	11	1	—		FIMI: Gold
Una storia importante / Una historia importante	Released: 21 November 2025; Label: Friends & Partners / Sony; Formats: CD, LP, download	1	—N/a	11	20	11	—	—	18	4	—	FIMI: Gold	
"—" denotes releases that did not chart.

=== Compilation albums ===
List of compilation albums, with selected details, chart positions and certifications
Title	Album details	Peak chart positions										Certifications
Title	Album details	ITA FIMI	ITA M&D	AUT	BEL (FL)	BEL (WA)	SPA	FRA	GER	NLD	SWI	Certifications
Eros	Released: 28 October 1997; Label: DDD; Formats: CD, cassette	1	1	1	6	3	6	3	1	1	1	BVMI: 5× Platinum; BEA: 2× Platinum; IFPI AUT: 2× Platinum; IFPI FIN: Platinum; IFPI SWE: 2 Platinum; IFPI SWI:4× Platinum; PROMUSICAE: 2× Platinum; SNEP: 2× Platinum; RIAA: 2× Platinum (Latin)
L'essentiel	Released: 5 May 2001; Label: BMG France Released in France only; Formats: CD, cassette	—	—	—	—	—	—	85	—	—	—	
e²	Released: 26 October 2007; Label: Ariola; Formats: CD	1	1	3	11	1	—	6	2	5	1	FIMI: Platinum; BEA: Platinum; BVMI: Gold; IFPI AUT: Platinum; IFPI SWE: 2× platinum; IFPI SWI: 2× Platinum; PROMUSICAE: Platinum; SNEP: Gold
The Collection	5-CD box set; Released: 5 March 2010; Label: RCA / Sony Music; Formats: CD	—	—	—	—	—	—	—	—	—	—	
Eros Best Love Songs / Eros Romántico / Mis Mejores Canciones de Amor	Released: 31 January 2012; Label: Sony Music; Formats: CD, download	2	2	23	6	4	—	28	54	71	8	FIMI: Platinum
Eros 30	Released: 27 October 2014; Label: RCA / Sony Music; Formats: 2CD / 3CD, download	4	3	—	54	17	—	—	—	8	15	FIMI: Platinum
Duets	Released: 17 November 2017; Label: RCA / Sony Music; Formats: CD, download	13	8	45	101	33	—	—	—	—	29	
"—" denotes releases that did not chart.

=== Live albums ===
List of live albums, with selected details, chart positions and certifications
Title	Album details	Peak chart positions									Certifications
Title	Album details	ITA FIMI	ITA M&D	AUT	BEL (FL)	BEL (WA)	FRA	GER	NLD	SWI	Certifications
Eros in concert	Released: 1991; Label: DDD; Formats: CD, cassette	—	4	—	—	—	—	37	22	21	IFPI SWI: Gold
Eros Live	Released: 1998; Label: DDD; Formats: CD, cassette	6	19	12	13	9	7	9	44	6	BVMI: Gold; BEA: Gold; IFPI AUT: Gold; IFPI SWI: Platinum; SNEP: Gold
21.00: Eros Live World Tour 2009/2010	Released: 30 November 2010; Label: RCA; Formats: 2×CD, 2×CD+DVD, DVD, download, 3×LP	3	8	51	—	81	181	100	—	50	FIMI: Platinum
"—" denotes releases that did not chart.

== EPs ==
List of extended plays, with selected details, chart positions, sales, and certifications
Title	Details	Peak chart positions							Sales	Certifications
Title	Details	ITA FIMI	ITA M&D	AUT	GER	NLD	SPA	SWI	Sales	Certifications
Musica è / Música es	Released: 4 July 1988; Label: DDD; Formats: CD, LP, cassette	98^{[B]}	2	10	4	5	2	2	ITA: 700,000; WW: 2,500,000	BVMI: Platinum; IFPI SWI: Gold

== Singles ==
=== As lead singer ===
Title	Year	Peak chart positions										Sales	Certifications	Album
Title	Year	ITA FIMI	ITA M&D	AUT	BEL (FL)	BEL (WA)	SPA	FRA	GER	NLD	SWI	Sales	Certifications	Album
"Ad un amico"	1982	—	—	—	—	—	—	—	—	—	—			Non-album single
"Terra promessa"	1984	—	6	—	—	—	—	—	—	—	—			Cuori agitati
"Buongiorno bambina"	1984	—	—	—	—	—	—	—	—	—	—			Cuori agitati
"Una storia importante"	1985	—	1	—	—	—	—	2	—	—	7	FRA: 700,000; WW: 1,000,000	FIMI: Gold; SNEP: Gold	Cuori agitati
"Cuori agitati"; "Almas rebeldes"	1985	—	—	—	—	—	—	—	—	—	—			Cuori agitati
"Adesso tu"; "Ahora tú"	1986	—	1	1	—	—	—	—	—	—	1	ITA: 300,000	AFI: Gold	Nuovi eroi; Héroes de hoy
"Un cuore con le ali"	1986	—	—	21	—	—	—	—	—	—	—			Nuovi eroi; Héroes de hoy
"Emozione dopo emozione"; "Emociones cuantas emociones"	1986	—	—	—	—	—	—	—	—	—	—			Nuovi eroi; Héroes de hoy
"Nuovi eroi"	1986	—	—	—	—	—	—	—	—	—	—			Nuovi eroi; Héroes de hoy
"Ma che bello questo amore"	1987	—	—	19	16	—	—	—	—	17	21			In certi momenti; En ciertos momentos
"Libero dialogo"; "Diálogo"	1987	—	—	—	—	—	—	—	—	—	—			In certi momenti; En ciertos momentos
"Occhi di speranza"	1988	—	—	—	—	—	—	—	—	—	—			In certi momenti; En ciertos momentos
"Senza perderci di vista"	1988	—	—	—	—	—	—	—	—	—	—			In certi momenti; En ciertos momentos
"La luce buona delle stelle" (featuring Patsy Kensit)	1988	—	—	—	—	—	—	—	—	98	—			In certi momenti; En ciertos momentos
"Solo con te"	1988	—	—	—	—	—	—	—	—	—	—			Musica è; Música es
"In segno d'amicizia"	1988	—	—	—	—	—	—	—	—	—	—			Musica è; Música es
"Musica è"	1988	—	—	—	15	—	—	—	—	14	—			Musica è; Música es
"Ti sposerò perché"	1989	—	—	—	—	—	—	—	—	61	—			Musica è; Música es
"Terra promessa" (re-release)	1989	—	—	—	—	—	—	—	—	51	—			Cuori agitati
"Se bastasse una canzone"; "Si bastasen un par de canciones"	1990	—	—	15	2	—	—	11	19	4	7			In ogni senso; En todos los sentidos
"Amarti è l'immenso per me"; "Amarte es total"	1990	—	—	—	26	—	—	—	—	30	—			In ogni senso; En todos los sentidos
"Dolce Barbara"	1990	—	—	—	46	—	—	—	—	27	—			In ogni senso; En todos los sentidos
"Canzoni lontane"	1990	—	—	—	—	—	—	—	—	—	—			In ogni senso; En todos los sentidos
"Amor en contra"	1990	—	—	—	—	—	—	—	—	—	—			In ogni senso; En todos los sentidos
"Ancora vita"	1991	—	—	—	34	—	—	—	—	64	—			Eros in Concert
"Cose della vita"; "Cosas de la vida"	1993	—	6	15	1	—	—	14	30	12	7		IFPI SWI: Gold	Tutte storie; Todo historias
"Un'altra te"; "Otra como tú"	1993	—	23	—	12	—	—	—	58	—	11			Tutte storie; Todo historias
"Un grosso no"	1993	—	—	—	—	—	—	—	—	—	—			Tutte storie; Todo historias
"Favola"	1993	—	—	—	28	—	—	—	—	—	—			Tutte storie; Todo historias
"A mezza via"; "A medio camino"	1994	—	—	—	45	—	—	—	—	—	—			Tutte storie; Todo historias
"Ya no hay fantasia"	1994	—	—	—	—	—	—	—	—	—	—			Tutte storie; Todo historias
"Più bella cosa"; "La cosa más bella"	1996	—	1	9	12	5	—	8	17	23	6		FIMI: Platinum; SNEP: Silver	Dove c'è musica; Donde hay música
"Stella gemella"; "Estrella gemela"	1996	—	—	—	—	37	—	—	77	—	—			Dove c'è musica; Donde hay música
"L'Aurora"; "La aurora"	1996	—	—	—	—	—	—	—	89	—	—			Dove c'è musica; Donde hay música
"Dove c'è musica"; "Donde hay música"	1997	—	—	—	—	—	—	—	65	—	—			Dove c'è musica; Donde hay música
"Quanto amore sei"; "Cuanto amor me das"	1997	2	8	17	43	11	—	—	52	84	6			Eros
"Cose della vita (Can't Stop Thinking of You)"; "Cosas de la vida (Can't Stop Thinking of You)"; (with Tina Turner)	1997	—	—	10	21	8	6	6	4	4	7		SNEP: Silver	Eros
"Terra promessa '98" ^{[C]}; "Tierra prometida"	1998	—	—	—	8^{[D]}	—	12	—	74	84	46			Eros
"Ancora un minuto di sole"	1998	—	—	—	—	—	—	—	—	—	—			Eros
"That's All I Need To Know – Difenderò" (Live) (with Joe Cocker)	1998	—	—	—	10^{[D]}	37	—	—	86	—	—			Eros Live
"Fuoco nel fuoco"; "Fuego en el fuego"	2000	1	3	29	47	4	5	21	50	79	4			Stilelibero; Estilo libre
"Un angelo non è"	2000	—	—	—	8^{[D]}	2^{[D]}	—	—	91	—	32			Stilelibero; Estilo libre
"Più che puoi" (with Cher)	2001	20	16	—	4^{[D]}	14	—	42	61	43	17			Stilelibero; Estilo libre
"L'ombra del gigante"	2001	25	18	74	8^{[D]}	16^{[D]}	—	57	83	—	52			Stilelibero; Estilo libre
"Per me per sempre"	2001	—	—	—	—	14^{[D]}	—	—	91	85	69			Stilelibero; Estilo libre
"Un'emozione per sempre"; "Una emoción para siempre"	2003	1	1	31	36	25	7	—	35	43	1		FIMI: Gold	9
"Un attimo di pace"	2003	12	11	—	11^{[D]}	10^{[D]}	19	—	87	84	34			9
"Solo ieri"	2004	—	—	—	—	11^{[D]}	—	—	—	96	59			9
"Ti vorrei rivivere"	2004	—	—	—	—	—	—	—	—	—	56			9
"La nostra vita"; "Nuestra vida"	2005	1	2	36	4^{[D]}	32	—	—	—	—	6	ITA: 43,000	FIMI: Platinum	Calma apparente; Calma aparente
"I Belong to You (Il Ritmo della Passione)"(with Anastacia)	2006	1	2	2	2	5	—	—	1	6	1		FIMI: Gold; BVMI: Gold; BEA: Gold; IFPI AUT: Gold; IFPI SWI: Gold	Calma apparente; Calma aparente
"Bambino nel tempo"	2006	25	14	—	11^{[D]}	8^{[D]}	—	—	—	—	40	ITA: 10,000		Calma apparente; Calma aparente
"Non siamo soli"; "No estamos solos; (with Ricky Martin)	2007	1	1	45	7^{[D]}	15	2	—	32	—	3	ITA: 90,258	PROMUSICAE: 3× Platinum	e²
"Il tempo tra di noi"	2007	25	10	—	—	—	—	—	—	—	—	ITA: 25,317		e²
"Fuoco nel fuoco"; "Fuego en el fuego"; (featuring Carlos Santana)	2008	—	—	—	—	—	—	—	—	—	—			e²
"Ci parliamo da grandi"; "Somos grandes o no"	2008	21	2	—	—	—	—	—	—	—	—	ITA: 51,799		e²
"Parla con me"; "Dímelo a mí"	2009	1	2	31	7^{[D]}	2^{[D]}	41	—	—	83	8			Ali e radici; Alas y raíces
"Linda e il mare"; "Linda y el mar"	2009	40	35	—	—	—	—	—	—	—	—			Ali e radici; Alas y raíces
"Controvento"	2009	23	14	—	—	—	—	—	—	—	—			Ali e radici; Alas y raíces
"Il cammino"	2009	37	24	—	—	—	—	—	—	—	—			Ali e radici; Alas y raíces
"Bucaneve"	2010	—	—	—	—	—	—	—	—	—	—			Ali e radici; Alas y raíces
"Appunti e note"	2010	—	—	—	—	—	—	—	—	—	—			Ali e radici; Alas y raíces
"Un angelo disteso al sole"; "Un ángel como el sol tú eres"	2012	5	1	46	15^{[D]}	36	20	188	66	—	27		FIMI: Platinum	Noi; Somos
"Questa nostra stagione"	2013	61	—	—	—	—	—	—	—	—	—			Noi; Somos
"Fino all'estasi" (featuring Nicole Scherzinger)	2013	20	9	—	68^{[D]}	—	—	—	—	—	—		FIMI: Gold	Noi; Somos
"Io prima di te"; "Antes de ti"	2013	4	21	—	—	25^{[D]}	—	—	—	—	44			Noi due; Somos dos
"Alla fine del mondo"; "Al fin del mundo"	2015	46	13	—	55^{[D]}	11^{[D]}	—	—	—	—	—			Perfetto; Perfecto
"Il tempo non sente ragione"	2015	—	46	—	85^{[D]}	—	—	—	—	—	—			Perfetto; Perfecto
"Sei un pensiero speciale"	2015	88	36	—	—	—	—	—	—	—	—		FIMI: Gold	Perfetto; Perfecto
"Buon Natale (Se vuoi)"; "Feliz Navidad (Si tú quieres)"	2015	—	—	—	—	—	—	—	—	—	—			Perfetto; Perfecto
"Vita ce n'è"	2018	54	—	—	45^{[D]}	9^{[D]}	—	—	—	—	41			Vita ce n'è; Hay vida
"Per le strade una canzone" (featuring Luis Fonsi)	2019	88	—	—	19^{[D]}	37^{[D]}	—	—	—	—	—		FIMI: Gold	Vita ce n'è; Hay vida
"Ama"	2022	—	—	—	—	—	—	—	—	—	—			Battito infinito; Latido infinito
"Sono"; "Soy"(featuring Alejandro Sanz)	2022	—	—	—	—	—	—	—	—	—	—			Battito infinito; Latido infinito
"Il mio giorno preferito"; "Mi día preferido"	2025	96	—	—	—	—	—	—	—	—	—			Una storia importante; Una historia importante
"—" denotes releases that did not chart.

=== As featured artist ===
Title	Year	Peak chart positions				Sales	Certifications	Album
Title	Year	ITA FIMI	ITA M&D	BEL (FL)	BEL (WA)	Sales	Certifications	Album
"Anche tu" (Raf feat. Eros Ramazzotti)	1992	—	—	—	—			Tutto
"Una ragione di più" (Massimo Di Cataldo feat. Eros Ramazzotti)	2001	—	—	—	—			Il mio tempo
"Domo mia" (Tazenda feat. Eros Ramazzotti)	2007	6	2	—	—	ITA: 68,000		Vita
"Solo un volo" (Ornella Vanoni feat. Eros Ramazzotti)	2008	3	4	—	—			Più di me
"Inevitabile" (Giorgia feat. Eros Ramazzotti)	2011	9	3	46^{[D]}	9^{[D]}		FIMI: Platinum	Dietro le apparenze / Eros Best Love Songs
"La mia felicità" (Fabio Rovazzi feat. Eros Ramazzotti)	2021	74	—	—	—			Non-album single

== Other appearances ==
Song	Year	Album
"Lo strano percorso" (Max Pezzali feat. Eros Ramazzotti)	2013	Max 20
"Credi" (Rocco Hunt feat. Eros Ramazzotti)	2014	'A verità

== Videography ==
=== Video albums ===
Year	Video information	Chart positions		Notes	Certifications
Year	Video information	GER	SWI	Notes	Certifications
1992	In Giro Per Il Mondo: Released: 1 November 1992; Studio: Sony BMG; Format: VHS	—	—	The Video recording contains concert footage including home movies from his time spent in America and songs recorded until 1992 including hits like: "Una historia importante", "Terra promessa", "Se bastasse una canzone" and "Musica e".	
1997	Eros: Released: 10 November 1997; Studio: Ariola (BMG); Format: VHS	—	—	The Video contains live performances of hit singles such as: "Cose Della Vita", "Piu'Bella Cosa", "L'Aurora" and "Quanto Amore Sei". It also includes best career video clips.	
2001	Stilelibero: Released: 12 November 2001; Studio: Ariola (BMG); Format: VHS, DVD	—	—	The video contains live performances from Stilelibero and previous albums. It also contains bonus tracks from the 2000 World Showcase as well as video clips and recordings of backstage footages in Los Angeles, London, Milan, Istanbul.	
2004	Eros Roma Live^{E}: Released: 1 November 2004; Studio: Sony Music; Format: VHS, DVD	81	96	The video contains 23 hits performed live in Rome on 7 July 2004. Performances include all the notable songs from the beginning of Ramazzotti's career until his 2003 album 9. The videos also contains backstage and off-stage footages of Ramazzotti's 2003/2004 worldwide tour.	SWI: Gold
2010	21.00: Eros Live World Tour 2009/2010: Released: 2010; Studio: Sony Music; Format: DVD, Blu-ray	—	6	The video contains 27 hit-tracks such as: "Terra promessa", "Una storia importante", "Musica", "Stella Gemella, "Sarà l'aurora", "Più bella cosa", "Non siamo soli" (featuring Ricky Martin), "Parla con me" and "Controvento"	

=== Music videos ===
Year	Title	Album
1985	"Una storia importante"	Cuori agitati
1986	"Adesso tu" (2 versions)	Nuovi eroi
1987	"La luce buona delle stelle" (with Patsy Kensit)	In certi momenti
1990	"Se bastasse una canzone"/"Si bastasen un par de canciones"	In ogni senso/En todos los sentidos
1990	"Amarti è l'immenso per me"/"Amarte es total" (with Antonella Bucci)	In ogni senso/En todos los sentidos
1991	"Ancora vita"	Eros in Concert
1993	"Cose della vita"/"Cosas de la vida"	Tutte storie/Todo historias
1993	"Un'altra te"/"Otra como tú"	Tutte storie/Todo historias
1993	"Favola"/"Fábula"	Tutte storie/Todo historias
1996	"Stella gemella"/"Estrella gemela"	Dove c'è musica/Donde hay música
1996	"Più bella cosa"/"La cosa más bella"	Dove c'è musica/Donde hay música
1996	"L'Aurora"/"La aurora"	Dove c'è musica/Donde hay música
1997	"Cose della vita"/"Cosas de la vida" (re-recorded) (with Tina Turner)	Eros
1997	"Quanto amore sei"/"Cuánto amor me das"	Eros
1997	"Memorie" (re-recorded)	Eros
1998	"Terra promessa" (re-recorded) (with Icy Bro)	non-album
2000	"Un angelo non è"/"Un ángel no es"	Stilelibero/Estilo libre
2000	"Fuoco nel fuoco"/"Fuego en el fuego"	Stilelibero/Estilo libre
2001	"Più che puoi" (with Cher)	Stilelibero/Estilo libre
2001	"Para mí será por siempre"	Stilelibero/Estilo libre
2001	"L'ombra del gigante"/"La sombra del gigante"	Stilelibero/Estilo libre
2003	"Un attimo di pace"/"Un segundo de paz"	9
2003	"Un'emozione per sempre"	9
2004	"Solo ieri"	9
2005	"La nostra vita"	Calma apparente/Calma aparente
2005	"I Belong to You (Il ritmo della passione)" (2 versions) (with Anastacia)	Calma apparente/Calma aparente
2006	"Bambino nel tempo"/"Como un niño"	Calma apparente/Calma aparente
2006	"Sta passando novembre"/"Está pasando noviembre"	Calma apparente/Calma aparente
2007	"Non siamo soli"/"No estamos solos" (with Ricky Martin)	e²
2007	"Il tempo tra di noi"/"El tiempo entre los dos"	e²
2008	"Ci parliamo da grandi"/"Somos grandes o no"	e²
2009	"Parla con me"/"Dímelo a mí"	Ali e radici/Alas y raíces
2009	"Controvento"	Ali e radici/Alas y raíces
2010	"Appunti e note"	Ali e radici/Alas y raíces
2012	"Un angelo disteso al sole"/"Un ángel como el sol tú eres"	Noi/Somos
2013	"Questa nostra stagione"/"Este tiempo tan nuestro"	Noi/Somos
2013	"Fino all'estasi"/"Hasta el éxtasis" (with Nicole Scherzinger)	Noi/Somos
2013	"Io prima di te"/"Antes de ti"	Noi due/Somos dos
2015	"Alla fine del mondo"/"Al fin del mundo"	Perfetto/Perfecto
2015	"Il tempo non sente ragione"/"El tiempo no da razones"	Perfetto/Perfecto
2015	"Sei un pensiero speciale"/"Una idea especial"	Perfetto/Perfecto
2015	"Buon Natale (Se vuoi)"/"Feliz Navidad (Si tú quieres)"	Perfetto/Perfecto
2016	"Rosa nata ieri"/"Flor nacida ayer"	Perfetto/Perfecto
2018	"Vita ce n'è"/"Hay vida"	Vita ce n'è/Hay vida
2018	"In primo piano"	Vita ce n'è/Hay vida
2018	"Per le strade una canzone"/"Por las calles las canciones" (with Luis Fonsi)	Vita ce n'è/Hay vida
2019	"Siamo"	Vita ce n'è/Hay vida
2019	"Vale per sempre" (lyric video) (Cantonese and Mandarin versions) (with Gin Lee)	non-album
2022	"Ama" (Italian and Spanish versions)	Battito infinito/Latido infinito
2022	"Sono"/"Soy" (with Alejandro Sanz)	Battito infinito/Latido infinito
2022	"Gli ultimi romantici"/"Los últimos románticos"	Battito infinito/Latido infinito
2022	"Magia"	Battito infinito/Latido infinito
2025	"Il mio giorno preferito"/"Mi día preferido"	Una storia importante
2025	"Stupide parole romantiche"/"Estúpidas palabras románticas"	Una storia importante
2025	"L'aurora"/"La aurora" (with Alicia Keys)	Una storia importante
2025	"Come nei film" (with Max Pezzali)	Una storia importante

== Notes ==
- A A "Dischi D'oro" edition of Cuori agitati reached 48 on the FIMI chart in 2000. The chart did not began until 1995, so the 1985 release did not have an initial run.
- B Musica è spent a week at number 98 on the FIMI album chart, which began around nine years after the EP's release, in 2009; thus, it did not have an initial run.
- C The 1998 single version of "Terra promessa" was released as the 1997 re-recorded solo version from the album Eros, as well as a version that featured additional rap vocals by Icy Bro.
- D Did not appear on the official Belgian Ultratop 50 chart, but rather on Ultratip chart, which combines "Airplay and Sales" for the tracks outside the Ultratop 50-chart.
- E The listed positions for the Concert DVD Eros Roma Live released in 2004 are for the German audio album chart and the Swiss audio album chart. DVD/Blu-ray albums can chart on Audio Album Chart both in Germany and Switzerland.
