= 21.00: Eros Live World Tour 2009/2010 =

Live album by Eros Ramazzotti
- Released: 30 November 2010
- Genre: Pop, rock
- Label: RCA, Sony Music
- Producer: Eros Ramazzotti, Michele Canova Iorfida

Eros Ramazzotti chronology
Ali e radici (2009)	21.00: Eros Live World Tour 2009/2010 (2010)	Noi (We) (2012)

21.00: Eros Live World Tour 2009/2010 is a live album by Italian singer-songwriter Eros Ramazzotti, released by RCA Records on 30 November 2010.

The main edition of the album is composed of two Compact Discs, featuring twenty-six songs recorded live during the 2009–2010 tour promoting the album Ali e radici. The Special Edition of the album also includes a DVD, featuring the documentary Appunti e note di un viaggio, directed by Paolo Zambaldi. The album was also released in a DVD-only edition and in a limited 3-LPs edition.

== Track listing ==
Disc 1
No.	Title	Length
1.	"Appunti e note (from the album Ali e radici)"	4:29
2.	"Dove c'è musica (from the album Dove c'è musica)"	4:47
3.	"Un attimo di pace (from the album 9)"	4:49
4.	"Quanto amore sei (from the album Eros)"	4:05
5.	"Stella gemella (from the album Dove c'è musica)"	4:49
6.	"Terra promessa (from the album Cuori agitati)"	3:26
7.	"Una storia importante (from the album Cuori agitati)"	2:09
8.	"Adesso tu (from the album Nuovi eroi)"	2:13
9.	"Se bastasse una canzone (from the album In ogni senso)"	5:54
10.	"Bucaneve (from the album Ali e radici)"	4:18
11.	"Favola (from the album Tutte storie)"	5:57
12.	"Un'emozione per sempre (from the album 9)"	4:24
13.	"I Belong to You (Il ritmo della passione) (from the album Calma apparente)"	4:43

Disc 2
No.	Title	Length
1.	"Musica è (from the album Musica è)"	7:06
2.	"Amore contro (from the album In ogni senso)"	3:02
3.	"Un'altra te (from the album Tutte storie)"	3:22
4.	"L'aurora (from the album Dove c'è musica)"	4:02
5.	"Per me per sempre (from the album Stilelibero)"	3:31
6.	"L'orizzonte (from the album Ali e radici)"	3:42
7.	"Controvento (from the album Ali e radici)"	4:23
8.	"Il cammino (from the album Ali e radici)"	3:44
9.	"L'ombra del gigante (from the album Stilelibero)"	4:59
10.	"Cose della vita (from the album Tutte storie)"	4:48
11.	"Questo immenso show (from the album Dove c'è musica)"	5:02
12.	"Parla con me (from the album Ali e radici)"	4:09
13.	"Più bella cosa (from the album Dove c'è musica)"	5:05

Disc 2 Bonus Track (iTunes)
No.	Title	Length
14.	"Fuoco nel fuoco"	4:08

== Charts and certifications ==
=== Peak positions ===
Chart (2010)	Peak position
Austrian Albums Chart	51
Belgian Albums Chart (Wallonia)	81
Belgian Music DVDs Chart (Wallonia)	6
Dutch Music DVDs Chart	10
French Albums Chart	181
French Music DVDs Chart	25
German Albums Chart	100
Greek Albums Chart	27
Italian Albums Chart	3
Italian Music DVDs Chart	3
Swiss Albums Chart	50
Swiss Music DVDs Chart	6

=== Year-end charts ===
Chart (2010)	Position
Italian Albums Chart	36

=== Certifications ===
Region	Certification	Certified units/sales
Italy (FIMI)	Platinum	60,000^{*}
^{*} Sales figures based on certification alone.

== Personnel ==
Credits adapted from Allmusic.

Music credits

- Sara Bellantoni – background vocals
- Luca Colombo – guitar
- Diego Corradin – drums
- Romina Falconi – background vocals
- Claudio Guidetti – guitar, vocals
- Reggie Hamilton – bass
- Everette Harp – saxophone
- Michael Landau – guitar
- Gary Novak – drums
- Nicola Peruch – keyboards
- Eros Ramazzotti – vocals
- Luca Scarpa – keyboards, piano
- Giorgio Secco – guitar
- Chiara Vergati – background vocals

Production credits

- Sara Benmessaoud – photography
- Michele Canova Iorfida – producer
- Pino "Pinaxa" Pischetola – mixing
- Eros Ramazzotti – producer
- Flora Sala – cover design
- Pat Simonini – assistant, digital editing
- Max Tommasini – assistant
- Paolo Zambaldi – photography
