= E² (album) =

e²

Greatest hits album by Eros Ramazzotti
- Released: 26 October 2007
- Recorded: 1984–2007
- Genre: Pop, Latin
- Label: Sony BMG Norte, Ariola

Eros Ramazzotti chronology
Calma apparente (2005)	e² (2007)	Ali e radici (2009)

Professional ratings
Review scores
Source	Rating
AllMusic	4/5 stars

e² is a greatest hits album by the Italian singer Eros Ramazzotti, released in Europe and Latin America on 26 October 2007. This is his fourteenth album (including live and compilation albums), and his second greatest hits album after Eros in 1997. The first single released from the album was "Non siamo soli", a vocal duet with the Latin singer Ricky Martin.

== Track listing ==
=== Disc 1 ===
The first disc has four new songs and fourteen remastered hits.

No.	Title	Writer(s)	Length
1.	"Non siamo soli" (duet with Ricky Martin)	Kaballà, Claudio Guidetti, Eros Ramazzotti	3:45
2.	"Terra promessa"	Alberto Salerno, Ramazzotti, Renato Brioschi	3:35
3.	"Una storia importante"	Piero Cassano, Adelio Cogliati, Ramazzotti	4:05
4.	"Un cuore con le ali"	Cassano, Cogliati, Ramazzotti	3:50
5.	"Adesso tu"	Cassano, Cogliati, Ramazzotti	4:02
6.	"Se bastasse una canzone"	Cassano, Cogliati, Ramazzotti	5:05
7.	"Cose della vita (Can't Stop Thinking of You)" (duet with Tina Turner)	Cassano, Cogliati, Ramazzotti, J. Ralston	4:48
8.	"Un'altra te"	Cassano, Cogliati, Ramazzotti	4:40
9.	"Favola"	Cassano, Cogliati, Ramazzotti	4:20
10.	"L'aurora"	Cogliati, Ramazzotti	5:37
11.	"Più bella cosa"	Cassano, Guidetti, Ramazzotti	4:23
12.	"Più che puoi" (duet with Cher)	Cogliati, Ramazzotti, Antonio Galbiati, Cher	4:11
13.	"Non ti prometto niente"	Cogliati, Ramazzotti	4:05
14.	"I Belong to You (Il ritmo della passione)" (duet with Anastacia)	DioGuardi, Kaballà, Anastacia, Guidetti, Ramazzotti	4:26
15.	"La nostra vita"	Guidetti, Ramazzotti	4:37
16.	"Ci parliamo da grandi"	Mika, Alice Visconti, Guy Chambers, Niccolò Agliardi, Ramazzotti	4:33
17.	"Dove si nascondono gli angeli"	Kaballà, Guidetti, Ramazzotti	3:44
18.	"Il tempo tra di noi"	Kaballà, Ramazzotti, Galbiati	4:26

=== Disc 2 ===
The second disc has seventeen hits "revised" with popular international artists.

No.	Title	Writer(s)	Length
1.	"Adesso tu" (with Gian Piero Reverberi & London Session Orchestra)	Cassano, Cogliati, Ramazzotti	3:59
2.	"Cose che ho visto" (produced by Michele Canova)	Cassano, Cogliati, Ramazzotti	4:07
3.	"Musica è" (with Gian Piero Reverberi & London Session Orchestra)	Cassano, Cogliati, Ramazzotti	12:24
4.	"Dolce Barbara" (with Dado Moroni)	Cassano, Cogliati, Ramazzotti	4:23
5.	"Taxi Story" (with Jon Spencer)	Cassano, Cogliati, Ramazzotti	4:00
6.	"Cose della vita" (produced by John Shanks)	Cassano, Cogliati, Ramazzotti	4:25
7.	"L'aurora" (with Wyclef Jean)	Cogliati, Ramazzotti	3:19
8.	"Più bella cosa" (produced by John Shanks)	Cogliati, Guidetti, Ramazzotti	4:23
9.	"Dove c'è musica" (with Steve Vai)	Maurizio Fabrizio, Cogliati, Guidetti, Ramazzotti	5:01
10.	"E ancor mi chiedo" (with Gian Piero Reverberi & London Session Orchestra)	Fabrizio, Cogliati, Guidetti Ramazzotti	5:17
11.	"Fuoco nel fuoco" (with Carlos Santana)	Cogliati, Guidetti, Ramazzotti	4:02
12.	"L'ombra del gigante" (produced by Pat Leonard)	Lorenzo Cherubini, Cogliati, Guidetti, Ramazzotti	4:26
13.	"Il buio ha i tuoi occhi" (with Rhythm Del Mundo)	Cogliati, Guidetti, Ramazzotti	4:04
14.	"Un attimo di pace" (with Take 6)	Cogliati, Guidetti, Ramazzotti	3:18
15.	"Un'emozione per sempre" (with The Chieftains)	Fabrizio, Cogliati, Guidetti, Ramazzotti	3:46
16.	"Solo ieri" (with Gian Piero Reverberi & London Session Orchestra)	Fabrizio, Cogliati, Guidetti, Ramazzotti	4:09
17.	"Está pasando noviembre" (with Amaia Montero)	Fabrizio, Guidetti, Ramazzotti, Cogliati, Mila Ortiz Martin	4:11

=== DVD (limited edition only) ===
A limited edition DVD was released in Italy, with an additional DVD with fourteen music videos.

No.	Title	Writer(s)	Length
1.	"La luce buona delle stelle" (duet with Patsy Kensit)	Cassano, Cogliati, Ramazzotti	4:32
2.	"Se bastasse una canzone"	Cassano, Cogliati, Ramazzotti	4:51
3.	"Ancora vita"	Cassano, Cogliati, Ramazzotti	4:21
4.	"Cose della vita"	Cassano, Cogliati, Ramazzotti	4:13
5.	"Un'altra te"	Cassano, Cogliati, Ramazzotti	4:21
6.	"Più bella cosa"	Cassano, Cogliati, Ramazzotti	4:32
7.	"Stella gemella"	Ramazzotti, Cogliati, Mario Lavezzi, Vladimiro Tosetto	5:37
8.	"L'aurora"	Cogliati, Ramazzotti	4:44
9.	"Cose della vita (Can't stop thinking of you)" (duet with Tina Turner)	Cassano, Cogliati, Ramazzotti, Ralston	5:07
10.	"L'ombra del gigante"	Cherubini, Cogliati, Guidetti, Ramazzotti	4:32
11.	"Solo ieri"	Cogliati, Guidetti, Ramazzotti	4:13
12.	"I Belong to You (Il ritmo della passione)" (duet with Anastacia)	DioGuardi, Kaballà, Anastacia, Guidetti, Ramazzotti	4:50
13.	"Bambino nel tempo"	Ramazzotti, Guidetti, Giuseppe Rinaldi	4:26

== Charts ==
=== Weekly charts ===
Chart (2007–2008)	Peak position
Australian Albums (ARIA)	38
Austrian Albums (Ö3 Austria)	3
Belgian Albums (Ultratop Flanders)	11
Belgian Albums (Ultratop Wallonia)	1
Danish Albums (Hitlisten)	5
Dutch Albums (Album Top 100)	5
French Albums (SNEP)	6
German Albums (Offizielle Top 100)	2
Greek Album (IPFI)	1
Hungarian Albums (MAHASZ)	2
Italian Albums (FIMI)	1
Norwegian Albums (VG-lista)	2
Polish Albums (OLiS)	28
Portuguese Albums (AFP)	6
Spanish Albums (Promusicae)	2
Swedish Albums (Sverigetopplistan)	1
Swiss Albums (Schweizer Hitparade)	1
US Heatseekers Albums (Billboard)	18
US Latin Pop Albums (Billboard)	12
US Top Latin Albums (Billboard)	32

=== Year-end charts ===
Chart (2007)	Position
Austrian Albums (Ö3 Austria)	67
Belgian Albums (Ultratop Wallonia)	27
Dutch Albums (Album Top 100)	59
French Albums (SNEP)	76
Swiss Albums (Schweizer Hitparade)	10

Chart (2008)	Position
Austrian Albums (Ö3 Austria)	59
Belgian Albums (Ultratop Flanders)	63
Belgian Albums (Ultratop Wallonia)	39
Swedish Albums (Sverigetopplistan)	2
Swiss Albums (Schweizer Hitparade)	44

== Certifications ==
Region	Certification	Certified units/sales
Austria (IFPI Austria)	Platinum	20,000^{*}
Belgium (BRMA)	Platinum	30,000^{*}
Denmark (IFPI Danmark)	Gold	15,000^{^}
France (SNEP)	Gold	75,000^{*}
Germany (BVMI)	Gold	100,000^{^}
Greece (IFPI Greece)	Gold	7,500^{^}
Hungary (MAHASZ)	2× Platinum	12,000^{^}
Italy (FIMI)	Diamond	670,000
Poland (ZPAV)	Gold	10,000^{*}
Portugal (AFP)	Gold	10,000^{^}
Russia (NFPF)	Gold	10,000^{*}
Spain (Promusicae)	Platinum	80,000^{^}
Sweden (GLF)	2× Platinum	80,000^{^}
Switzerland (IFPI Switzerland)	2× Platinum	40,000^{^}
Summaries
Europe (IFPI)	Platinum	1,000,000^{*}
^{*} Sales figures based on certification alone.^{^} Shipments figures based on certification alone.
