= Eros (Eros Ramazzotti album) =

Greatest hits album by Eros Ramazzotti
- Released: 28 October 1997
- Studio: Fonoprint, Bologna, Italy; Record Plant, Los Angeles, California
- Genre: Pop, rock
- Length: 76:02
- Label: BMG
- Producer: Eros Ramazzotti, Piero Cassano

Eros Ramazzotti chronology
| Dove c'è musica (1996) | Eros (1997) | Stilelibero (2000) |

Professional ratings
Review scores
| Source | Rating |
|---|---|
| AllMusic | 4.5/5 stars |

Eros is the first greatest hits album by Italian pop/rock singer Eros Ramazzotti.

It was released in 1997 on the BMG label. Of the album's 16 tracks, five are original recordings, nine are re-recordings and two new tracks.

Two of the re-recorded tracks are duets; "Musica è" featuring Andrea Bocelli and "Cose della vita (Can't Stop Thinking of You)" with Tina Turner. Eros topped the albums chart in six countries.

== Track listing ==
Tracks written by Eros Ramazzotti, Piero Cassano, Adelio Cogliati unless stated.

1. "Terra promessa" (Ramazzotti, Brioschi, Salerno) – 4:38
2. "Una storia importante" – 4:05
3. "Adesso tu" – 4:02
4. "Ma che bello questo amore" – 4:12
5. "Musica è" (duet with Andrea Bocelli) – 9:46
6. "Occhi di speranza" – 3:19
7. "Più bella cosa" – 4:24
8. "Memorie" – 3:31
9. "Cose della vita (Can't Stop Thinking of You)" (duet with Tina Turner; Ramazzotti, Cassano, Cogliati, Ralston, Turner) – 4:48
10. "L'aurora" – 5:32
11. "Ancora un minuto di sole" (Ramazzotti, Cassano, Cogliati, Fabrizio) – 3:56
12. "Quasi amore" – 5:08
13. "Se bastasse una canzone" – 5:22
14. "Un'altra te" – 4:40
15. "Favola" – 4:23
16. "Quanto amore sei" (Ramazzotti, Cogliati, Guidetti) – 4:16
- Original recordings: Tracks 7, 10, 12, 14, 15
- Re-recordings: Tracks 1–6, 8, 9, 13
- New recordings: Tracks 11, 16

== Charts ==
=== Weekly charts ===
Weekly chart performance for Eros
| Chart (1997–2007) | Peak position |
|---|---|
| Austrian Albums (Ö3 Austria) | 1 |
| Belgian Albums (Ultratop Flanders) | 6 |
| Belgian Albums (Ultratop Wallonia) | 3 |
| Danish Albums (Hitlisten) | 4 |
| Dutch Albums (Album Top 100) | 1 |
| European Top 100 Albums (Billboard) | 1 |
| Finnish Albums (Suomen virallinen lista) | 4 |
| French Albums (SNEP) | 3 |
| German Albums (Offizielle Top 100) | 1 |
| Greek International Albums (IFPI Greece) | 1 |
| Hungarian Albums (MAHASZ) | 5 |
| Italian Albums (FIMI) | 47 |
| Norwegian Albums (VG-lista) | 1 |
| Portuguese Albums (AFP) | 6 |
| Spanish Albums (Promusicae) | 78 |
| Swedish Albums (Sverigetopplistan) | 5 |
| Swiss Albums (Schweizer Hitparade) | 1 |
| US Top Latin Albums (Billboard) | 11 |
| US Latin Pop Albums (Billboard) | 6 |

=== Year-end charts ===
1997 year-end chart performance for Eros
| Chart (1997) | Rank |
|---|---|
| Austrian Albums (Ö3 Austria) | 27 |
| Belgian Albums (Ultratop Flanders) | 18 |
| Belgian Albums (Ultratop Wallonia) | 8 |
| Danish Albums (Hitlisten) | 17 |
| European Top 100 Albums (Billboard) | 30 |
| French Albums (SNEP) | 46 |
| German Albums (Offizielle Top 100) | 31 |
| Swedish Albums (Sverigetopplistan) | 38 |

1998 year-end chart performance for Eros
| Chart (1998) | Rank |
|---|---|
| Austrian Albums (Ö3 Austria) | 6 |
| Belgian Albums (Ultratop Flanders) | 28 |
| Belgian Albums (Ultratop Wallonia) | 20 |
| Danish Albums (Hitlisten) | 13 |
| Dutch Albums (Album Top 100)[ | 3 |
| French Albums (SNEP) | 27 |
| German Albums (Offizielle Top 100) | 5 |
| Swedish Albums (Sverigetopplistan) | 60 |
| Swiss Albums (Schweizer Hitparade) | 8 |

== Certifications and sales ==
Certifications and sales for Eros
| Region | Certification | Certified units/sales |
|---|---|---|
| Argentina (CAPIF) | Platinum | 60,000^{^} |
| Austria (IFPI Austria) | 2× Platinum | 100,000^{*} |
| Belgium (BRMA) | 2× Platinum | 100,000^{*} |
| Brazil (Pro-Música Brasil) | Gold | 100,000^{‡} |
| Canada (Music Canada) | Gold | 50,000^{^} |
| Denmark (IFPI Danmark) | 6× Platinum | 120,000^{‡} |
| Finland (Musiikkituottajat) | Platinum | 54,381 |
| France (SNEP) | 2× Platinum | 600,000^{*} |
| Greece (IFPI Greece) | Platinum | 60,000^{^} |
| Germany (BVMI) | 3× Platinum | 1,500,000^{^} |
| Italy 1997 sales | — | 700,000 |
| Italy (FIMI) sales since 2009 | Platinum | 50,000^{‡} |
| Latvia | Gold | 4,000 |
| Mexico (AMPROFON) | Gold | 100,000^{^} |
| Netherlands (NVPI) | 2× Platinum | 200,000^{^} |
| Norway (IFPI Norway) | 2× Platinum | 100,000^{*} |
| Portugal | — | 60,000 |
| Spain (Promusicae) | 2× Platinum | 200,000^{^} |
| Sweden (GLF) | 2× Platinum | 160,000^{^} |
| Switzerland (IFPI Switzerland) | 4× Platinum | 200,000^{^} |
| United States (RIAA) | 2× Platinum (Latin) | 200,000^{^} |
Summaries
| Europe (IFPI) | 5× Platinum | 5,000,000^{*} |
^{*} Sales figures based on certification alone.^{^} Shipments figures based on certification alone.^{‡} Sales+streaming figures based on certification alone.
