= List of best-selling albums in Italy =

The following is an independently list of the best-selling albums in Italy. Federazione Industria Musicale Italiana (FIMI) or related publishers does not provide an official list but news and mainstream media usually have provided albums sales claims.

The best-selling album of all time in Italy is La vita è adesso (1985) by Claudio Baglioni which remained for 27 consecutive weeks in first place in Superclassifica TV Sorrisi e Canzoni, from 16 June 1985 to 12 January 1986 (a record that still stands today) and a total of 90 weeks (18 months) in the top ten with more than 4.5 million copies sold.

The best-selling album in the world by an Italian is Andrea Bocelli's Romanza, with over 20 million copies (800,000 in Italy). The best selling foreign album in Italy is estimated to be True Blue by Madonna with 1.5 million copies.

== Best-selling albums of all-time in Italy ==
=== 1 million or more copies ===
Year	Artist	Album	Sales	Notes
1985	Claudio Baglioni	La vita è adesso	4,000,000 − 4,500,000	
1989	Zucchero Fornaciari	Oro Incenso & Birra	2,025,000	
1998	Mina, Adriano Celentano	Mina Celentano	2,000,000	
1973	Pink Floyd	The Dark Side of the Moon	1,900,000	
1981	Claudio Baglioni	Strada facendo	1,850,000	
1999	Adriano Celentano	Io non so parlar d'amore	1,825,000	
1996	Lucio Dalla	Canzoni	1,800,000	
1999	Lunapop	...Squérez?	1,625,000	
1995	Claudio Baglioni	Io sono qui	1,500,000	
1979	Julio Iglesias	Innamorarsi Alla Mia Età	1,500,000	
1986	Madonna	True Blue	1,500,000	
1972	Claudio Baglioni	Questo piccolo grande amore	1,500,000	
1987	Zucchero Fornaciari	Blue's	1,500,000	
1988	Antonello Venditti	In questo mondo di ladri	1,500,000	
1990	Lucio Dalla	Cambio	1,500,000	
1996	Eros Ramazzotti	Dove c'è musica	1,500,000	
2000	Adriano Celentano	Esco di rado e parlo ancora meno	1,500,000	
1991	Antonello Venditti	Benvenuti in paradiso	1,400,000	
1992	Zucchero Fornaciari	Miserere	1,400,000	
1993	883	Nord sud ovest est	1,300,000	
1995	Zucchero Fornaciari	Spirito DiVino	1,300,000	
1986	Eros Ramazzotti	Nuovi eroi	1,300,000	
1981	Renato Zero	Artide Antartide	1,300,000	
1984	Michael Jackson	Thriller	1,250,000	
2004	Vasco Rossi	Buoni o cattivi	1,250,000	
1998	Renato Zero	Amore Dopo Amore	1,200,000	
1980	Renato Zero	Tregua	1,200,000	
2005	Eros Ramazzotti	Calma apparente	1,200,000	
1987	Michael Jackson	Bad	1,150,000	
1996	Zucchero Fornaciari	The Best of Zucchero Sugar Fornaciari's Greatest Hits	1,100,000	
2000	The Beatles	1	1,100,000	
2003	Eros Ramazzotti	9	1,100,000	
1997	Ligabue	Su e giù da un palco	1,060,000	
1982	Franco Battiato	La voce del padrone	1,050,000	
1986	Lucio Dalla	DallAmeriCaruso	1,030,000	
1986	Claudio Baglioni	Assolo	1,030,000	
1992	Whitney Houston / Various artists	The Bodyguard	1,025,000	
1993	Vasco Rossi	Gli spari sopra	1,025,000	
1995	Ligabue	Buon Compleanno Elvis	1,025,000	
1977	Amanda Lear	I Am a Photograph	1,000,000	
1977	Bee Gees	Saturday Night Fever	1,000,000	
1984	Bruce Springsteen	Born in the U.S.A.	1,000,000	
1982	Claudio Baglioni	Alé Oó	1,000,000	
1984	Madonna	Like a Virgin	1,000,000 (Note: In Italy, Like a Virgin received a platinum award for the sales of 500,000 copies in 1986. The following year, it received an additional platinum with the same level-requeriments (making a total of 1 million certified units) despite that for new releases, a platinum was equivalent to 200,000 copies at that time.)	
1988	Lucio Dalla	Dalla/Morandi	1,000,000	
1990	Eros Ramazzotti	In ogni senso	1,000,000	
1991	Marco Masini	Malinconoia	1,000,000	
1992	Luca Carboni	Carboni	1,000,000	
1993	Eros Ramazzotti	Tutte storie	1,000,000	
1995	Antonello Venditti	Prendilo tu questo frutto amaro	1,000,000	
1997	Pino Daniele	Dimmi cosa succede sulla terra	1,000,000	
1998	Pino Daniele	Yes I know my way	1,000,000	
1998	Vasco Rossi	Canzoni per me	1,000,000	
1998	Zucchero Fornaciari	BlueSugar	1,000,000	
1979	Rockets	Galaxy	1,000,000	

== See also ==
- List of certified albums in Italy (best selling albums in Italy since 2009)
- List of best-selling singles in Italy
- List of best-selling albums
- Italian estimated best-selling music artists
