= Se bastasse una canzone =

Single by Eros Ramazzotti

from the album In ogni senso
- B-side: "Amore contro"
- Released: 1990
- Length: 4:23
- Songwriters: Eros Ramazzotti; Piero Cassano; Adelio Cogliati
- Producer: Eros Ramazzotti

Eros Ramazzotti singles chronology
"Terra promessa" (1989)	"Se bastasse una canzone" (1990)	"Amarti è l'immenso per me" (1990)

"Se bastasse una canzone" (transl. Italian for "If a Song Were Enough") is a song by Italian pop and rock singer, songwriter and record producer Eros Ramazzotti. Written by Ramazzotti, Piero Cassano and Adelio Cogliati, it was the lead single and the first track from his fourth studio album In ogni senso – the album title was used in the song's lyrics –, and was released in the middle of 1990. The single, which was dedicated to suffering people who hope for a better world, was a hit, reaching the top-20 in seven in European territories, and is included on Ramazzotti's 1997 greatest hits album Eros.

== Critical reception ==
"Se bastasse una canzone" is considered one of the best in Ramazzotti's discography by Giovanni Ferrari of Italian magazine Panorama who ranked it at the ninth position in his list of Ramazzotti's 15 greatest songs.

== Chart performance ==
"Se bastasse una canzone" attained its highest position in the Flanders region of Belgium where it reached number two and charted for 16 weeks, and peaked at number four for two weeks on the Dutch Top 100, out of a 15-week chart run, in the Netherlands. It was a top-ten hit in Switzerland, charting for 20 weeks in the top 30 with two of them at number seven, and in Norway. In addition, it reached the top 20 in other three nations: in France, where it missed the top ten by one place and stayed in the top 50 for 16 weeks, and in Austria in Germany where it peaked at number 15 and number 19, respectively, with 27 weeks of charting in the latter country. On the pan-European charts established by Music & Media, it peaked at number 28 in its 14th week and charted for 26 weeks in the top 100 of the European Hot 100 Singles, and reached number one for one week on the Airplay Top 50 chart.

== Cover versions ==
Ramazzotti recorded two duet versions of the song. The first version was with Luciano Pavarotti in 1998 (with collaboration of Steve Gadd, Pino Palladino, Rob Mathes (guitar), Robbie Kondor, the Orchestra Filarmonica Di Torino and Marco Boemi), which Chérie FM site deemed a "powerful duet" and an "unforgettable moment", and was included on the charity album Pavarotti & Friends for the Children of Liberia. The second version was with Andrea Boccelli in 2025 and is the eighth track on Ramazzotti's sixteenth studio album Una storia importante.

== Track listings ==
- 7" single
1. "Se bastasse una canzone" (radio edit) – 4:23
2. "Amore contro" – 4:24
- 7" single
1. "Se bastasse una canzone" – 5:06
2. "Amore contro" – 4:24
- CD maxi / 12" maxi
1. "Se bastasse una canzone" – 5:06
2. "Amore contro" – 4:24
3. "Occhi di speranza" (remix) – 3:16

== Charts ==
=== Weekly charts ===
Chart (1990)	Peak position
Austria (Ö3 Austria Top 40)	15
Belgium (Ultratop 50 Flanders)	2
Europe (Eurochart Hot 100)	28
Europe (European Airplay Top 50)	1
France (SNEP)	11
Germany (GfK)	19
Italy Airplay (Music & Media)	1
Netherlands (Dutch Top 40)	2
Netherlands (Single Top 100)	4
Norway (VG-lista)	10
Switzerland (Schweizer Hitparade)	7

=== Year-end charts ===
Chart (1990)	Position
Belgium (Ultratop 50 Flanders)	12
Europe (Eurochart Hot 100)	56
Europe (European Airplay Top 50)	15
Europe (European Adult Contemporary)	4
Germany (Media Control)	47
Netherlands (Dutch Top 40)	23
Netherlands (Single Top 100)	26
Switzerland (Schweizer Hitparade)	21
