= Non siamo soli =

Single by Eros Ramazzotti and Ricky Martin

from the album e²
- Released: October 2, 2007
- Recorded: 2006
- Genre: Latin pop
- Length: 3:45
- Songwriters: Claudio Guidetti, Eros Ramazzotti, Kaballà, Mila Ortiz Martin
- Producers: Claudio Guidetti, Eros Ramazzotti

Eros Ramazzotti singles chronology
"Sta passando novembre" (2006)	"Non siamo soli" (2007)	""Il Tempo Tra di Noi""

Ricky Martin singles chronology
"Con Tu Nombre" (2007)	"Non siamo soli" (2007)	"The Best Thing About Me Is You" (2010)

Music videos
- "Non siamo soli" on YouTube
- "No Estamos Solos" on YouTube

"Non siamo soli" (Italian: [non ˈsjaːmo ˈsoːli]; English: "We Are Not Alone") is a single by Eros Ramazzotti with Latin singer Ricky Martin, who sang it exclusively in Italian. The song, the first single from the greatest hits of Eros Ramazzotti, e², has a second Spanish-language version, "No Estamos Solos".

== Music video ==
The music video for the song was directed by Wayne Isham and was filmed in Miami Beach, Florida in August 2007. Both, an italian and a Spanish version of the video were shot.

== Chart performance ==
The song topped the Italian chart for eleven consecutive weeks. It also peaked at number two in Spain and number three in Switzerland. The song reached number fifteen in Belgian Wallonia, number thirty-two in Germany and number forty-five in Austria. In the United States, it peaked at number twenty-one on the Hot Latin Songs chart.

== Track listing ==
European CD/digital single

1. "Non siamo soli" – 3:45
2. "No Estamos Solos" (Spanish version) – 3:44

European CD maxi-single

1. "Non siamo soli" – 3:45
2. "No Estamos Solos" (Spanish version) – 3:44
3. "Una Storia Importante" (Remix) – 3:59
4. "Non siamo soli" (Video) – 3:45

== Charts ==
=== Weekly charts ===
Chart (2007–2008)	Peak position
Austria (Ö3 Austria Top 40)	45
Belgium (Ultratip Bubbling Under Flanders)	7
Belgium (Ultratop 50 Wallonia)	15
Europe (European Hot 100 Singles)	41
Finland (Finnish Airplay Chart)	10
Germany (Official German Charts)	32
Hungary (Rádiós Top 40)	3
Italy (FIMI)	1
Russia (Tophit)	174
Romania (Romanian Top 100)	33
Russia (Tophit) "No Estamos Solos"	127
Spain (PROMUSICAE) "No Estamos Solos"	2
Switzerland (Schweizer Hitparade)	3
US Hot Latin Songs (Billboard) "No Estamos Solos"	21

=== Year-end charts ===
Chart (2007)	Peak position
Hungary (Rádiós Top 40)	91
Spain (PROMUSICAE) "No Estamos Solos"	20
Switzerland (Schweizer Hitparade)	39

Chart (2008)	Peak position
Hungary (Rádiós Top 40)	3
Spain (PROMUSICAE) "No Estamos Solos"	9

Chart (2009)	Peak position
Hungary (Rádiós Top 40)	83

== Certifications and sales ==
Region	Certification	Certified units/sales
Italy Physical Sales	—	25,000
Italy Digital Download	—	60,000
Spain (Promusicae)	4× Platinum	80,000^{*}
Spain (Promusicae) Ringtone	6× Platinum	120,000^{*}
^{*} Sales figures based on certification alone.

== See also ==
- List of number-one hits of 2007 (Italy)
