= In certi momenti =

Studio album by Eros Ramazzotti
- Released: 1987
- Studio: Fonoprint, Bologna, Italy; Il Cortile, Milan, Italy; Excalibur, Milan, Italy; Logic Studio, Milan, Italy; Morning Studio, Milan, Italy
- Genre: Pop, rock
- Length: 42:38
- Label: BMG
- Producer: Piero Cassano

Eros Ramazzotti chronology
| Nuovi eroi (1986) | In certi momenti (1987) | Musica è (1988) |

In certi momenti (At Certain Times) is the third album by Italian pop/rock singer Eros Ramazzotti, produced by Piero Cassano and released in 1987 on the BMG label.

The decision was taken not to release any singles from In certi momenti in the domestic Italian market, although "La luce buona delle stelle" was released in other European territories. This track features the first of many vocal collaborations between Ramazzotti and other singers, in this case English singer/actress Patsy Kensit.

== Track listing ==
(All tracks written by Pierangelo Cassano, Adelio Cogliati, Eros Ramazzotti)

1. "Questo mio vivere un po' fuori" - 4:19
2. "OK ci sto" - 3:57
3. "La luce buona delle stelle" - 4:14 (duet with Patsy Kensit)
4. "Il gioco della verità" - 4:36
5. "Ma che bello questo amore" - 4:10
6. "Ciao pà" - 5:01
7. "Cose che ho visto" - 4:09
8. "Libero dialogo" - 4:35
9. "Occhi di speranza" - 3:16
10. "Senza perderci di vista" - 4:15

== Charts ==
Weekly chart performance for Cuori agitati
| Chart (1987) | Peak position |
|---|---|
| Austrian Albums (Ö3 Austria) | 5 |
| Dutch Albums (Album Top 100) | 23 |
| German Albums (Offizielle Top 100) | 17 |
| Swiss Albums (Schweizer Hitparade) | 3 |

== Certifications and sales ==
| Region | Certification | Certified units/sales |
|---|---|---|
| Germany (BVMI) | Gold | 250,000^{^} |
| Italy | — | 950,000 |
| Spain (Promusicae) En Ciertos Momentos | 2× Platinum | 200,000^{^} |
| Switzerland (IFPI Switzerland) | Platinum | 50,000^{^} |
Summaries
| Worldwide | — | 2,000,000 |
^{^} Shipments figures based on certification alone.
