= Perfetto =

Studio album by Eros Ramazzotti
- Released: 12 May 2015
- Language: Italian, Spanish
- Producer: Eros Ramazzotti, Claudio Guidetti

Eros Ramazzotti chronology
Eros 30 (2014)	Perfetto (2015)	Vita ce n'è (2018)

Singles from Noi
- 1. "Alla fine del mondo" Released: 27 March 2015; 2. "Il tempo non sente ragione" Released: 12 May 2015; 3. "Sei un pensiero speciale" Released: 21 August 2015; 4. "Buon natale (se vuoi)" Released: 27 November 2015; 5. "Rosa nata ieri" Released: 8 January 2016

Perfetto (English: "Perfect") also known by its Spanish name Perfecto, is the thirteenth studio album by Italian singer-songwriter Eros Ramazzotti, released by Universal Music on 12 May 2015.

== Track listing ==
No.	Title	Lyrics	Music	Length
1.	"Alla fine del mondo"	Francesco Bianconi; Kaballà; Eros Ramazzotti	Ramazzotti; Claudio Guidetti	3:55
2.	"Il tempo non sente ragione"	Bianconi; Kaballà; Ramazzotti	Ramazzotti; Guidetti	4:04
3.	"Perfetto"	Bianconi; Kaballà; Ramazzotti	Eros Ramazzotti; Guidetti	3:51
4.	"Sbandando"	Mogol	Ramazzotti; Guidetti	3:56
5.	"Sogno N. 3"	Bianconi; Kaballà; Ramazzotti	Ramazzotti; Guidetti	3:53
6.	"Rosa nata ieri"	Bianconi; Kaballà; Ramazzotti	Ramazzotti; Guidetti	3:50
7.	"Vivi e vai"	Bianconi; Kaballà; Ramazzotti	Ramazzotti; Guidetti	3:52
8.	"Un'altra estate"	Federico Zampaglione; Ramazzotti	Ramazzotti; Guidetti	4:07
9.	"L'amore è un modo di vivere"	Zampaglione; Ramazzotti	Ramazzotti; Guidetti	3:55
10.	"Il viaggio"	Bianconi; Kaballà; Ramazzotti	Ramazzotti; Claudio Guidetti	3:44
11.	"Tu gelosia"	Zampaglione; Ramazzotti	Ramazzotti; Claudio Guidetti	3:50
12.	"Sei un pensiero speciale"	Zampaglione; Ramazzotti	Ramazzotti; Claudio Guidetti	3:47
13.	"Buon Natale (Se vuoi)"	Francesco Bianconi; Kaballà; Ramazzotti	Ramazzotti; Claudio Guidetti; Gary Kemp	4:04
14.	"Tra vent'anni"	Ramazzotti; Pacifico	Ramazzotti; Pacifico; Claudio Guidetti	3:39
15.	"Alla fine del mondo" (Acoustic Demo Version)			2:28

== Credits ==
- A&R - Fausto Donato
- Producer - Eros Ramazzotti, Claudio Guidetti
- Recording Engineer - Mike Tacci
- Tape Machine/Pro Tools Operator - Marco Sonzini
- Vocal Engineer/Overdub Engineer - Claudio Guidetti
- Keyboard Engineer, Overdub Engineer, Pro-Tools, Vocal Engineer - Davide Tagliapietra
- Studio Assistant - Miguel Lara, Michael Peterson, Pat Simonini
- Mixing Engineer - Pino 'Pinaxa' Pischetola
- Mastering Engineer - Antonio Baglio
- Executive Producer - Saverio Principini
- Executive Production Coordinator - Marco Sorrentino
- Photography - Toni Thorimbert
- Artwork - Flora Sala
- Composer - Eros Ramazzotti, Francesco Bianconi, Gino 'Pacifico' De Crescenzo, Claudio Guidetti, Gary Kemp, Federico Zampaglione

== Charts ==
=== Weekly charts ===
Chart (2015)	Peak position
Austrian Albums (Ö3 Austria)	5
Belgian Albums (Ultratop Flanders)	3
Belgian Albums (Ultratop Wallonia)	2
Dutch Albums (Album Top 100)	5
French Albums (SNEP)	16
German Albums (Offizielle Top 100)	5
Greek Albums (IFPI)	13
Hungarian Albums (MAHASZ)	12
Italian Albums (FIMI)	1
Spanish Albums (Promusicae)	3
Swiss Albums (Schweizer Hitparade)	2

=== Year-end charts ===
Chart (2015)	Position
Belgian Albums (Ultratop Flanders)	62
Belgian Albums (Ultratop Wallonia)	19
French Albums (SNEP)	189
Spanish Albums (PROMUSICAE)	91
Swiss Albums (Schweizer Hitparade)	28

== Certifications ==
Region	Certification	Certified units/sales
Austria (IFPI Austria)	Gold	7,500^{*}
Belgium (BRMA)	Gold	15,000^{*}
Italy (FIMI)	Platinum	50,000^{*}
Switzerland (IFPI Switzerland)	Gold	10,000^{^}
^{*} Sales figures based on certification alone.^{^} Shipments figures based on certification alone.
