= Nuovi eroi =

Studio album by Eros Ramazzotti
- Released: 1986
- Recorded: Il Cortile, Milan, Italy; Excalibur, Milan, Italy
- Genre: Pop, rock
- Length: 55:13
- Label: BMG
- Producer: Piero Cassano

Eros Ramazzotti chronology
Cuori agitati (1985)	Nuovi eroi (1986)	In certi momenti (1987)

Nuovi eroi (New Heroes) is the second album by Italian pop/rock singer Eros Ramazzotti, produced by Piero Cassano and released in 1986 on the BMG label.

Lead single "Adesso tu" won the 1986 San Remo Music Festival, and topped the singles charts in Italy, Switzerland and Austria. The version included on the album is 1:05 longer than the single version, with additional instrumental passages. Nuovi eroi went on to reach #1 in the same three countries. It is the first of eleven consecutive full-length studio albums by Ramazzotti, up to and including 2009's Ali e radici, to top the Italian Albums chart.

The CD issue of the album contains four additional tracks taken from Ramazzotti's debut album Cuori agitati.

== Track listing ==
(Tracks written by Pierangelo Cassano, Adelio Cogliati, Eros Ramazzotti unless stated)

1. "Un cuore con le ali" - 3:52
2. "Un nuovo amore" - 4:11
3. "E mi ribello" - 4:22
4. "Fuggo dal nulla" - 3:47
5. "Con gli occhi di un bambino" - 4:19
6. "Lacrime di gioventù" - 4:52
7. "Emozione dopo emozione" - 4:34
8. "Adesso tu" - 5:04
9. "Nuovi eroi" - 4:11
10. "Una storia importante" - 4:09
11. "Cuori agitati" - 3:45
12. "Buongiorno bambina" - 4:15
13. "Terra promessa" - 3:45

(Tracks 10–13 also included on Cuori agitati)

== Charts ==
=== Weekly charts ===
Chart (1986)	Peak position
Austrian Albums (Ö3 Austria)	1
German Albums (Offizielle Top 100)	38
Swedish Albums (Sverigetopplistan)	29
Swiss Albums (Schweizer Hitparade)	1

=== Year-end charts ===
Chart (1986)	Position
Austrian Albums (Ö3 Austria)	5
Swiss Albums (Schweizer Hitparade)	4

Chart (1987)	Position
Austrian Albums (Ö3 Austria)	2

== Certifications and sales ==
Region	Certification	Certified units/sales
Austria (IFPI Austria)	2× Platinum	100,000^{*}
Germany (BVMI)	Gold	250,000^{^}
Italy (FIMI)	2× Platinum	1,300,000
Spain (Promusicae) Heroes De Hoy	Gold	50,000^{^}
Switzerland (IFPI Switzerland)	2× Platinum	100,000^{^}
^{*} Sales figures based on certification alone.^{^} Shipments figures based on certification alone.
