= In ogni senso =

Studio album by Eros Ramazzotti
- Released: 10 April 1990
- Recorded: Fonoprint, Bologna, Italy; Logic Studio, Milan, Italy; Mayday Studio, Milan, Italy; Abbey Road Studios, London, England; Paradise Studios, Monaco
- Genre: Pop, rock
- Length: 51:30
- Label: BMG
- Producer: Piero Cassano

Eros Ramazzotti chronology
Musica è (1988)	In ogni senso (1990)	Tutte storie (1993)

Professional ratings
Review scores
Source	Rating
AllMusic	3/5 stars

In ogni senso (In Every Sense) is the fifth album by Italian pop/rock singer Eros Ramazzotti, produced by Piero Cassano and released on April 10, 1990, on the BMG label. In ogni senso topped the Italian Albums chart and was Ramazzotti's most successful album internationally to that point, also reaching #2 in Europe's second-largest music sales market, Germany. Backing vocals on several tracks were recorded in London with renowned English-based session singers including Jimmy Helms, Katie Kissoon, Carol Kenyon and Tessa Niles.

== Track listing ==
(All tracks written by Pierangelo Cassano, Adelio Cogliati, Eros Ramazzotti, and English translations are listed, where possible.)

1. "Se bastasse una canzone" - 5:06 (If a Song's Enough)
2. "C'è una strada in cielo" - 4:21 ("There's a Road in the Sky")
3. "Amore contro" - 4:24 ("Love Against")
4. "Dammi la luna" - 3:49 ("Give me the Moon")
5. "Taxi Story" - 3:59
6. "Dolce Barbara" - 4:05 ("Sweet Barbara")
7. "Amarti è l'immenso per me" - 4:22 (duet with Antonella Bucci) ("Loving You is the Best Thing for Me")
8. "Canzoni lontane" - 4:59 ("Distant Song")
9. "Cara prof" - 3:58 ("Dear Professor")
10. "Cantico" - 5:44 ("Canticle")
11. "Oggi che giorno è" - 4:33 ("Today is that day"; literally, "Today, that day is.")
12. "Andare...in ogni senso" - 2:20 (duet with Piero Cassano) ("Go...in every sense")

== Chart performance ==
=== Weekly charts ===
Weekly chart performance for In ogni senso
Chart (1990)	Peak position
Austrian Albums (Ö3 Austria)	5
Belgian Albums (Ultratop Flanders)	1
Dutch Albums (Album Top 100)	1
European Albums (Music & Media)	3
French Albums (SNEP)	17
German Albums (Offizielle Top 100)	2
Italian Albums (Musica e dischi)	1
Norwegian Albums (VG-lista)	10
Spanish Albums (Promusicae)	3
Swedish Albums (Sverigetopplistan)	34
Swiss Albums (Schweizer Hitparade)	1

=== Year-end charts ===
1990 year-end chart performance for In ogni senso
Chart (1990)	Position
Austrian Albums (Ö3 Austria)	14
Dutch Albums (Album Top 100)	9
European Albums (Music & Media)	3
German Albums (Offizielle Top 100)	8
Italian Albums (Musica e dischi)	2
Swiss Albums (Schweizer Hitparade)	3

1991 year-end chart performance for In ogni senso
Chart (1991)	Position
German Albums (Offizielle Top 100)	100

== Certifications and sales ==
Region	Certification	Certified units/sales
Austria (IFPI Austria)	Gold	25,000^{*}
France (SNEP)	Gold	100,000^{*}
Germany (BVMI)	Platinum	500,000^{^}
Italy	—	1,000,000
Mexico	—	200,000
Netherlands (NVPI)	Platinum	100,000^{^}
Spain (Promusicae) En Todos Los Sentidos	2× Platinum	200,000^{^}
Switzerland (IFPI Switzerland)	3× Platinum	150,000^{^}
Summaries
Worldwide	—	3,200,000
^{*} Sales figures based on certification alone.^{^} Shipments figures based on certification alone.

== See also ==
- List of best-selling albums in Italy
