= Dove c'è musica =

Studio album by Eros Ramazzotti
- Released: 13 May 1996
- Recorded: Fonoprint, Bologna, Italy; LCD Recording Studio, Inverigo, Italy
- Genre: Pop, rock
- Length: 56:40
- Label: BMG
- Producer: Eros Ramazzotti

Eros Ramazzotti chronology
Tutte storie (1993)	Dove c'è musica (1996)	Eros (1997)

Professional ratings
Review scores
Source	Rating
Allmusic	4/5 stars

Dove c'è musica (Where There Is Music) is the seventh studio album by Italian pop/rock singer Eros Ramazzotti, released in 1996 on the BMG label. It is Ramazzotti's first self-produced album and the first without any involvement from long-time collaborator Piero Cassano. Dove c'è musica was Ramazzotti's most successful album to that point, topping the Albums chart in six countries including Italy and Germany.

== Track listing ==
=== Dove c'è musica ===
No.	Title	Writer(s)	Length
1.	"Dove c'è musica"	Eros Ramazzotti, Claudio Guidetti, Maurizio Fabrizio, Adelio Cogliati	4:44
2.	"Stella gemella"	Ramazzotti, Vladimiro Tosseto, Mario Lavezzi, Cogliati	4:38
3.	"Più bella cosa"	Ramazzotti, Guidetti, Cogliati	4:24
4.	"L'Aurora"	Ramazzotti, Cogliati	5:37
5.	"Lettera al futuro"	Ramazzotti, Cogliati	4:17
6.	"Io amerò"	Ramazzotti, Cogliati	5:07
7.	"Questo immenso show"	Ramazzotti, Cogliati	5:27
8.	"Quasi amore"	Ramazzotti, Cogliati	5:07
9.	"Yo sin tì"	Ramazzotti, Tosseto, Nacho Mañó	4:12
10.	"Lei però"	Ramazzotti, Tosseto, Cogliati	4:50
11.	"L'uragano Meri"	Ramazzotti, Cogliati	4:46
12.	"Buona vita"	Ramazzotti, Tosseto, Cogliati	3:51

=== Donde hay música ===
No.	Title	Writer(s)	Length
1.	"Donde hay música"	Eros Ramazzotti, Claudio Guidetti, Maurizio Fabrizio, Adelio Cogliati	4:44
2.	"Estrella gemela"	Ramazzotti, Vladimiro Tosseto, Mario Lavezzi, Cogliati	4:38
3.	"La cosa más bella"	Ramazzotti, Guidetti, Cogliati	4:24
4.	"La aurora"	Ramazzotti, Cogliati	5:37
5.	"Carta al futuro"	Ramazzotti, Cogliati	4:17
6.	"Yo amaré"	Ramazzotti, Cogliati	5:07
7.	"Este inmenso show"	Ramazzotti, Cogliati	5:27
8.	"Casi amor"	Ramazzotti, Cogliati	5:07
9.	"Yo sin tì" (Spanish-language version)	Ramazzotti, Tosseto, Nacho Mañó	4:12
10.	"Pero ella"	Ramazzoti, Tosseto, Cogliati	4:50
11.	"Huracán Meri"	Ramazzotti, Cogliati	4:46
12.	"Buena vida"	Ramazzotti, Tosseto, Cogliati	3:51

== Personnel ==
- Alex Baroni – backing vocals, chorus
- Luca Bignardi – programming, engineer, drum programming, mixing
- Alberto Bonardi – engineer, mixing assistant
- Marco Borsatti – mixing assistant
- Alex Brown – backing vocals, chorus
- Lenny Castro – percussion
- Vinnie Colaiuta – drums
- Emanuela Cortesi – backing vocals, chorus
- Lynn Davis – backing vocals, chorus
- Michelangelo Di Battista – photography
- Nathan East – bass
- David Garfield – piano
- Humberto Gatica – mixing
- Paolo Gianolio – acoustic guitar, bass
- Jim Gilstrap – backing vocals, chorus
- Gary Grant – trumpet
- Jerry Hey – trumpet
- Kim Hutchcroft – tenor sax
- Phillip Ingram – backing vocals, chorus
- Luca Jurman – backing vocals
- Michael Landau – guitar, electric guitar
- Charles Loper – trombone
- Nacho Maño – adaptation
- Sid Page – violin
- John Pena – bass
- Antonella Pepe – backing vocals, chorus
- John Pierce – bass
- Eros Ramazzotti – vocals, producer
- Bill Reichenbach Jr. – trombone
- Steve Tavaglione – tenor sax
- Celso Valli – organ, piano, arranger, director, keyboards, organ, programming, backing vocals, chorus, producer, drum programming
- Mimmo Verduci – art direction, concept
- Tommy Vicari – engineer
- Traisey Elana Williams – backing vocals

== Charts ==
=== Weekly charts ===
Weekly chart performance for Dove c'è musica
Chart (1996)	Peak position
Austrian Albums (Ö3 Austria)	1
Belgian Albums (Ultratop Flanders)	1
Belgian Albums (Ultratop Wallonia)	1
Canada Top Albums/CDs (RPM)	23
Danish Albums (Hitlisten)	4
Dutch Albums (Album Top 100)	5
Finnish Albums (Suomen virallinen lista)	6
French Albums (SNEP)	10
German Albums (Offizielle Top 100)	1
Hungarian Albums (MAHASZ)	3
Italian Albums (FIMI)	41
Norwegian Albums (VG-lista)	8
Portuguese Albums (AFP)	2
Spanish Albums (Promusicae)	2
Swedish Albums (Sverigetopplistan)	1
Swiss Albums (Schweizer Hitparade)	1
US Latin Albums	20
US Latin Pop Albums	12

=== Year-end charts ===
1996 year-end chart performance for Dove c'è musica
Chart (1996)	Position
German Albums (Offizielle Top 100)	3
Italian Albums (Hit Parade)	1

1997 year-end chart performance for Dove c'è musica
Chart (1997)	Position
German Albums (Offizielle Top 100)	32

== Sales and certifications ==
Region	Certification	Certified units/sales
Argentina (CAPIF)	Platinum	70,000
Austria (IFPI Austria)	3× Platinum	150,000^{*}
Belgium (BRMA)	Gold	25,000^{*}
Brazil (Pro-Música Brasil)	Gold	100,000^{*}
Denmark (IFPI Danmark)	Platinum	50,000^{^}
Finland (Musiikkituottajat)	Platinum	41,025
France (SNEP)	Platinum	400,000
Germany (BVMI)	3× Gold	1,500,000
Italy (FIMI) sales since 2009	Gold	25,000^{‡}
Italy	—	1,500,000
Mexico	—	70,000
Netherlands (NVPI)	Platinum	100,000^{^}
Spain (Promusicae)	3× Platinum	300,000^{^}
Sweden (GLF)	Platinum	100,000^{^}
Switzerland (IFPI Switzerland)	4× Platinum	200,000^{^}
United States (RIAA)	2× Platinum (Latin)	120,000^{‡}
Summaries
Europe (IFPI)	4× Platinum	4,000,000^{*}
Worldwide	—	5,000,000
^{*} Sales figures based on certification alone.^{^} Shipments figures based on certification alone.^{‡} Sales+streaming figures based on certification alone.

== See also ==
- List of best-selling albums in Germany
- List of best-selling albums in Italy
