= Cuori agitati =

Studio album by Eros Ramazzotti
- Released: 31 January 1985
- Studio: Il Cortile, Milan, Italy
- Genre: Pop, rock
- Length: 37:35
- Label: BMG
- Producer: Piero Cassano

Eros Ramazzotti chronology
Cuori agitati (1985)	Nuovi eroi (1986)

Cuori agitati (Troubled Hearts) is the debut album by Italian pop/rock singer Eros Ramazzotti, produced by Piero Cassano and released in 1985 on the BMG label.

Ramazzotti had won the 'New Voices' category in the 1984 Sanremo Music Festival with the song "Terra promessa", which went on to peak at number 2 on the Italian Singles Chart and is included here. At the 1985 Sanremo Festival, Ramazzotti entered the main competition with "Una storia importante", which placed sixth but subsequently topped the Italian chart and also reached number 2 in France. Cuori agitati made number 10 on the Italian Albums chart.

== Track listing ==
Cuori agitati tack listing
No.	Title	Writer(s)	Length
1.	"Cuori agitati"	Eros Ramazzotti, Adelio Cogliati, Piero Cassano	3:41
2.	"Respiro nel blu"	Ramazzotti, Cogliati, Cassano	3:25
3.	"Buongiorno Bambina"	Cassano, Ramazzotti	4:15
4.	"Ora"	Ramazzotti, Cogliati, Cassano	3:44
5.	"Volare navigare camminare"	Ramazzotti, Cogliati, Cassano	3:45
6.	"Una storia importante"	Ramazzotti, Cogliati, Cassano	3:35
7.	"Quando l'amore"	Ramazzotti, Cogliati, Cassano	3:58
8.	"Dritto per quell'unica via"	Ramazzotti, Cogliati, Cassano	3:47
9.	"Libertà libertà"	Ramazzotti	3:50
10.	"Terra promessa"	Ramazzotti, Renato Brioschi, Alberto Salerno	3:35
Total length:			37:35

== Singles ==
- "Terra promessa" (Italy #2)
- "Una storia importante" (Italy #1, France #2, Switzerland #7)

== Charts ==
Weekly chart performance for Cuori agitati
Chart (1985)	Peak position
Italian Albums (FIMI)	48
Swiss Albums (Schweizer Hitparade)	5

== Certifications and sales ==
Certifications and sales for Cuori agitati
Region	Certification	Certified units/sales
Austria (IFPI Austria)	Gold	25,000^{*}
France	—	600,000
Italy	—	500,000
Switzerland (IFPI Switzerland)	Gold	25,000^{^}
Summaries
Worldwide	—	1,200,000
^{*} Sales figures based on certification alone.^{^} Shipments figures based on certification alone.
