= Musica è =

Studio album by Eros Ramazzotti
- Released: 1988
- Recorded: 1988
- Studio: Fonoprint (Bologna, Italy); Il Cortile; Morning Studio (Milan, Italy)
- Genre: Pop; rock
- Length: 27:50 (5 track); 39:31 (8 track)
- Label: BMG
- Producer: Piero Cassano

Eros Ramazzotti chronology
In certi momenti (1987)	Musica è (1988)	In ogni senso (1990)

Musica è (English: "music is") is a mini album and the fourth album recorded by Italian pop and rock singer-songwriter Eros Ramazzotti, produced by Piero Cassano and was released in 1988 on the chpre BMG label. Two versions of the album exist: a five track release and an expanded eight track version, which includes two remixed tracks from Ramazzotti's previous album In certi momenti.

== Track listing ==
(All tracks written by Pierangelo Cassano, Adelio Cogliati, Eros Ramazzotti)

5 track version

1. "Musica è" – 11:00
2. "Ti sposerò perché" – 4:02
3. "In segno d'amicizia" – 3:53
4. "Solo con te" – 5:04
5. "Uno di noi" – 3:51

8 track version

1. "Musica è" – 11:00
2. "La luce buona delle stelle" (remix) – 4:47
3. "Ti sposerò perché" – 4:02
4. "In segno d'amicizia" – 3:53
5. "Solo con te" – 5:04
6. "Uno di noi" – 3:51
7. "Voglio volare" – 3:38
8. "Occhi di speranza" (remix) – 3:16

== Charts ==
Weekly chart performance for Musica è
Chart (1988–2009)	Peak position
Austrian Albums (Ö3 Austria)	10
Dutch Albums (Album Top 100)	5
German Albums (Offizielle Top 100)	4
Italian Albums (FIMI)	1
Swiss Albums (Schweizer Hitparade)	2

== Certifications and sales ==
Region	Certification	Certified units/sales
Germany (BVMI)	Platinum	500,000^{^}
Italy	—	700,000
Netherlands (NVPI)	Platinum	100,000^{^}
Switzerland (IFPI Switzerland)	Gold	25,000^{^}
Summaries
Worldwide	—	2,500,000
^{^} Shipments figures based on certification alone.
