= Battito Infinito =

Battito infinito

Studio album by Eros Ramazzotti
- Released: 16 September 2022
- Recorded: 2019–2022
- Genre: Pop rock
- Length: 47:07
- Languages: Italian; Spanish
- Label: Universal
- Producers: Eros Ramazzotti; Celso Valli; Nicolò Fragile

Eros Ramazzotti chronology
Vita ce n'è (2018)	Battito infinito (2022)	Una storia importante (2025)

Singles from Battito Infinito
- 1. "Ama" Released: 10 June 2022; 2. "Sono" Released: 25 August 2022; 3. "Gli ultimi romantici" Released: 25 November 2022

Battito Infinito (English: "Infinite beat"), also known by its Spanish title Latido Infinito, is the fifteenth studio album by Eros Ramazzotti, released on 16 September 2022 through Universal.

The album was promoted by three singles, including the collaboration "Sono/Soy" with Alejandro Sanz, and the Battito Infinito World Tour between Europe, United States and Latin America.

== Background and composition ==
After the publication of his fourteenth studio album Vita ce n'è (2018), Ramazzotti took a four-year discographic hiatus. He started working on a new recording project between 2019 and 2022.

The Italian version of the album has twelve songs, while the Spanish version has eleven tracks. Both versions were written and produced by Ramazzotti over three years. The project features the collaboration of numerous Italian and international authors and producers, including Cheope, Colapesce and Dimartino, Emilio Munda, Edwyn Roberts, Jovanotti and Alejandro Sanz, as well as the song "Ogni volta che respiro/Cada vez que respiro" written by Mariella Nava and composed by Ennio Morricone.

== Critical reception ==
The album received general positive reviews by music critics. Francesco Raiola of Fanpage.it stated that musically Ramazzotti "seeks a more contemporary sound while trying not to lose the Eros factor", which is not always successful, finding that thematically the project has a thread that unites all the songs: "universal love in its most varied forms".

== Track listing ==
=== Battito Infinito ===
Standard edition

No.	Title	Writer(s)	Producer(s)	Length
1.	"Battito infinito"	Eros Ramazzotti; Alfredo "Cheope" Rapetti	Ramazzotti; Nicolò Fragile	8:17
2.	"Ama"	Ramazzotti; Lorenzo Urciullo; Placido Salamone; Paolo Antonacci	Ramazzotti; Fragile	3:23
3.	"Madonna de Guadalupe"	Ramazzotti; Cheope; Marco Colavecchio	Ramazzotti; Fragile	3:30
4.	"Ritornare a ballare"	Ramazzotti; Urciullo; Antonio Di Martino	Ramazzotti; Fragile	3:43
5.	"Figli della terra" (with Jovanotti)	Ramazzotti; Urciullo; Martino; Antonio Filippelli; Daniel Bestonzo	Ramazzotti; Fragile	3:25
6.	"Eccezionali"	Ramazzotti; Alejandro Sanz; Antonio Calò; Edwyn Roberts; Stefano Marletta; Mila Ortiz	Ramazzotti; Fragile	3:23
7.	"Sono" (with Alejandro Sanz)	Ramazzotti; Marco Colavecchio; Piero Romitelli; Emilio Munda	Ramazzotti; Fragile	3:31
8.	"Gli ultimi romantici"	Ramazzotti	Ramazzotti; Celso Valli	3:29
9.	"Magia"	Ramazzotti; Romitelli; Munda; Pulli	Ramazzotti; Valli	3:31
10.	"Nessuno a parte noi"	Ramazzotti; Munda; Pulli; Marco Colavecchio	Ramazzotti; Fragile	3:49
11.	"Ti dedico"	Mariella Nava; Ennio Morricone	Ramazzotti; Valli	3:38
12.	"Ogni volta che respiro"	Ramazzotti; Cheope; Colavecchio; Aurora Ramazzotti	Ramazzotti; Valli	3:28

=== Latido infinito ===
The adaptations of the Spanish lyrics are by Mila Ortiz Martin.

No.	Title	Length
1.	"Latido infinito"	8:17
2.	"Ama"	3:23
3.	"Virgen de Guadalupe"	3:30
4.	"Volver a bailar"	3:43
5.	"Hijos de la tierra" (with Jovanotti)	3:25
6.	"Extraordinarios"	3:23
7.	"Soy" (with Alejandro Sanz)	3:31
8.	"Los últimos románticos"	3:29
9.	"Solo de los dos"	3:31
10.	"Es para ti"	3:49
11.	"Cada vez que respiro"	3:38

== Charts ==
Chart (2022)	Peak position
Austrian Albums (Ö3 Austria)	4
Belgian Albums (Ultratop Flanders)	5
Belgian Albums (Ultratop Wallonia)	3
Dutch Albums (Album Top 100)	14
French Albums (SNEP)	39
German Albums (Offizielle Top 100)	11
Hungarian Albums (MAHASZ)	12
Italian Albums (FIMI)	1
Spanish Albums (PROMUSICAE)	8
Swiss Albums (Schweizer Hitparade)	1

== Certifications ==
Certifications for Battito Infinito
Region	Certification	Certified units/sales
Italy (FIMI)	Gold	25,000^{‡}
^{‡} Sales+streaming figures based on certification alone.
