= 9 (Eros Ramazzotti album) =

Studio album by Eros Ramazzotti
- Released: 4 June 2003
- Recorded: MedaStudios, Milan, Italy; Fonoprint, Bologna, Italy; Impatto, Bologna, Italy; Abbey Road Studios, London, England
- Genres: Pop, rock
- Length: 51:27
- Label: BMG
- Producers: Eros Ramazzotti, Claudio Guidetti

Eros Ramazzotti chronology
Stilelibero (2000)	9 (2003)	Calma apparente (2005)

9 is the ninth studio album by Italian pop-rock singer Eros Ramazzotti, released on 4 June 2003 on the BMG label. Lead single "Un'emozione per sempre" topped the charts in Italy, Switzerland and (in its Spanish language version "Una emoción para siempre") Spain. 9 went to #1 on the Italian Albums chart, where it remained for 14 weeks; with sales of 760,000, it was the best-selling album of 2003 in Italy.

== Track listing ==
=== Italian-language edition ===
No.	Title	Writer(s)	Length
1.	"Un attimo di pace"	Ramazzotti, Adelio Cogliati, Claudio Guidetti	4:38
2.	"Solo ieri"	Ramazzotti, Cogliati, Guidetti	4:09
3.	"Un'emozione per sempre"	Ramazzotti, Cogliati, Guidetti, Maurizio Fabrizio	3:58
4.	"Ti vorrei rivivere"	Ramazzotti, Cogliati, Guidetti	4:29
5.	"Il buio ha i tuoi occhi"	Ramazzotti, Cogliati, Guidetti	4:02
6.	"Un'ancora nel vento"	Ramazzotti, Cogliati, Guidetti	4:06
7.	"Piccola pietra"	Ramazzotti, Cogliati, Guidetti, Fabrizio	4:07
8.	"Mamarà"	Ramazzotti, Cogliati, Guidetti	4:01
9.	"L'uomo che guardava le nuvole"	Ramazzotti, Cogliati, Guidetti	3:42
10.	"Canzone per lei"	Ramazzotti, Cogliati, Guidetti, Fabrizio Lamberti	3:42
11.	"Non ti prometto niente"	Ramazzotti, Cogliati, Guidetti	4:06
12.	"Falsa partenza"	Ramazzotti, Cogliati, Guidetti	4:02
13.	"C'è una melodia"	Ramazzotti, Cogliati	2:23

=== Spanish-language edition ===
No.	Title	Writer(s)	Length
1.	"Un segundo de paz"	Ramazzotti, Adelio Cogliati, Claudio Guidetti, Mila Ortíz Martín	4:38
2.	"Solo ayer"	Ramazzotti, Cogliati, Guidetti, Ortíz	4:09
3.	"Una emoción para siempre"	Ramazzotti, Cogliati, Guidetti, Maurizio Fabrizio, Ortíz	3:58
4.	"Revivirte otra vez"	Ramazzotti, Cogliati, Guidetti, Ortíz	4:29
5.	"La noche son tus ojos"	Ramazzotti, Cogliati, Guidetti, Ortíz	4:02
6.	"Un ancla en el viento"	Ramazzotti, Cogliati, Guidetti, Ortíz	4:06
7.	"Piedra pequeña"	Ramazzotti, Cogliati, Guidetti, Fabrizio, Ortíz	4:07
8.	"Mamarà, una gran mujer"	Ramazzotti, Cogliati, Guidetti, Ortíz	4:01
9.	"El hombre que miraba las nubes"	Ramazzotti, Cogliati, Guidetti, Ortíz	3:42
10.	"Cancion para ella"	Ramazzotti, Cogliati, Guidetti, Fabrizio Lamberti, Ortíz	3:42
11.	"No te prometo nada"	Ramazzotti, Cogliati, Guidetti, Ortíz	4:06
12.	"Falsa salida"	Ramazzotti, Cogliati, Guidetti, Ortíz	4:02
13.	"Hay una melodia"	Ramazzotti, Cogliati, Ortíz	2:23

== Personnel ==
- Michele Canova – arranger, keyboards, programming, loops, drum programming, mixing
- Vinnie Colaiuta – percussion, drums
- Max Costa – keyboards, programming
- Paolo Costa – bass
- Alfredo Golino – drums
- Isobel Griffiths – violin
- Claudio Guidetti – acoustic guitar, backing vocals, bouzouki, piano, arranger, electric guitar, keyboards, organ, electric piano, producer, fender rhodes, drum programming, mixing, pre-production, mandoline, recording, rickenbacker guitar, 12 string acoustic guitar, baritone guitar
- Michael Landau – acoustic guitar, electric guitar, nylon string guitar
- Eros Ramazzotti – vocals, backing vocals, guitar, percussion, arranger, electric guitar, producer, drum programming, pre-production, baritone guitar
- Celso Valli – piano, arranger, keyboards, organ, electric piano, producer, string arrangements, synthesizer bass, choir arrangement, string director

== Charts ==
=== Weekly charts ===
Weekly chart performance for Eros
Chart (2003)	Peak position
Argentine Albums (CAPIF)	1
Austrian Albums (Ö3 Austria)	2
Belgian Albums (Ultratop Flanders)	3
Belgian Albums (Ultratop Wallonia)	3
Danish Albums (Hitlisten)	2
Dutch Albums (Album Top 100)	5
European Top 100 Albums (Billboard)	2
Finnish Albums (Suomen virallinen lista)	9
French Albums (SNEP)	5
German Albums (Offizielle Top 100)	2
Greek Albums (IFPI Greece)	1
Hungarian Albums (Mahasz)	4
Italian Albums (FIMI)	1
Norwegian Albums (VG-lista)	6
Polish Albums (ZPAV)	18
Portuguese Albums (AFP)	27
Spanish Albums (PROMUSICAE)	5
Swedish Albums (Sverigetopplistan)	14
Swiss Albums (Schweizer Hitparade)	1
US Latin Pop Albums (Billboard)	9
US Top Latin Albums (Billboard)	30

=== Year-end charts ===
Year-end chart performance for Eros
Chart (1998)	Rank
Austrian Albums (Ö3 Austria)	25
Dutch Albums (Album Top 100)	25
French Albums (SNEP)	82
German Albums (Offizielle Top 100)	13
Swiss Albums (Schweizer Hitparade)	1

== Certifications ==
Region	Certification	Certified units/sales
Argentina (CAPIF)	Gold	20,000^{^}
Austria (IFPI Austria)	Gold	15,000^{*}
Belgium (BRMA)	Gold	25,000^{*}
Croatia (HDU)	Silver	
Denmark (IFPI Danmark)	Gold	20,000^{^}
France (SNEP)	2× Gold	200,000^{*}
Germany (BVMI)	Platinum	200,000^{^}
Greece (IFPI Greece)	Gold	10,000^{^}
Hungary (MAHASZ)	Gold	
Italy (FIMI)	11× Platinum	1,100,000^{*}
Italy (FIMI) sales since 2009	Gold	25,000^{‡}
Mexico (AMPROFON)	Gold	75,000^{^}
Netherlands (NVPI)	Gold	40,000^{^}
Norway (IFPI Norway)	Gold	20,000^{*}
Russia (NFPF)	Gold	10,000^{*}
Spain (Promusicae)	Gold	50,000^{^}
Switzerland (IFPI Switzerland)	3× Platinum	120,000^{^}
^{*} Sales figures based on certification alone.^{^} Shipments figures based on certification alone.^{‡} Sales+streaming figures based on certification alone.
