= Più bella cosa =

1996 single by Eros Ramazzotti

Single by Eros Ramazzotti

from the album Dove c'è musica
- Language: Italian
- English title: The Most Beautiful Thing
- Released: February 1996
- Recorded: January 3, 1996
- Genre: Pop rock
- Length: 4:23
- Label: DDD
- Composers: Eros Ramazzotti, Claudio Guidetti
- Lyricists: Eros Ramazzotti, Adelio Cogliati
- Producer: Eros Ramazzotti

"Più bella cosa" (pronounced [ˌpju bˈbɛlla ˈkɔːza]; meaning "The Most Beautiful Thing") is an Italian language song written by singer Eros Ramazzotti, with Claudio Guidetti, Maurizio Fabrizio and Adelio Cogliati, and performed by Ramazzotti in February 1996, as a first single and pre-release from his album Dove c'è musica ("Where There's Music") that came out on 13 May of that year.

The song is dedicated to the Swiss model Michelle Hunziker, Ramazzotti's girlfriend at the time. The two had a daughter born just a few months later on 5 December 1996, whom they named Aurora Sophie. Ramazotti would go on to release his song L'aurora, dedicated to his newborn, in February 1997. He later married Hunziker in 1998, but the two divorced in 2002.

== Accolades ==
He performed the song publicly during Festivalbar in the summer of 1996. The song won the "Best Song" award, with the album being awarded the "Best Album" award. The song also won the MTV Europe Gold Awards in 1997.

== Music video ==
The music video was directed by Nigel Dick for Squeak Pictures, featuring Ramazzotti and Hunziker.

== "La cosa más bella" ==
As is traditional with many other successful releases of Ramazzotti's, he released a Spanish language parallel song for Spain, Latin America and United States Latin markets titled "La cosa más bella". That version appears in the parallel Spanish-language version of the album Dove c'è musica retitled Donde hay música. It peaked at number one in Spain and number two on the Hot Latin Songs chart and number one on the Latin Pop Songs chart in the United States.

== Charts ==
Chart (1996)	Peak position
Austria (Ö3 Austria Top 40)	9
Belgium (Ultratop 50 Flanders)	12
Belgium (Ultratop 50 Wallonia)	5
France (SNEP)	8
Germany (GfK)	17
Italy (Musica e dischi)	1
Italy Airplay (Music & Media)	1
Netherlands (Single Top 100)	23
Spain (AFYVE)	1
Sweden (Sverigetopplistan)	22
Switzerland (Schweizer Hitparade)	6

== Certifications ==
Region	Certification	Certified units/sales
France (SNEP)	Silver	125,000^{*}
Italy (FIMI)	2× Platinum	200,000^{‡}
Mexico (AMPROFON)	Gold	30,000^{*}
^{*} Sales figures based on certification alone.^{‡} Sales+streaming figures based on certification alone.
