= Tutte storie =

Studio album by Eros Ramazzotti
- Released: 19 April 1993
- Recorded: 1992
- Studio: Fonoprint (Bologna); LCD Recording Studio (Inverigo); Profile Studio (Milan)
- Genre: Pop
- Length: 61:30
- Label: Sony BMG Music Entertainment

Eros Ramazzotti chronology
In ogni senso (1990)	Tutte storie (1993)	Dove c'è musica (1996)

Professional ratings
Review scores
Source	Rating
AllMusic	3/5 stars
Music Week	2/5 stars

Tutte storie (English "All the Stories" or "All Stories") is an album by Italian singer Eros Ramazzotti. It was released by Sony BMG on 19 April 1993. Tutte storie, which has sold over four million copies, helped Ramazzotti get his contract with BMG International.

== Track listing ==
=== Tutte storie ===
1. "Cose della vita" (Cosas de la vida) – 4:48
2. "A mezza via" – 5:37
3. "Un'altra te" (Otra como tú) – 4:40
4. "Memorie" – 4:50
5. "In compagnia" – 4:38
6. "Un grosso no" – 5:04
7. "Favola" (Fábula) – 4:20
8. "Non c'è più fantasia" – 3:51
9. "Nostalsong" – 4:27
10. "Niente di male" – 4:02
11. "Esodi" – 4:31
12. "L'ultima rivoluzione" – 4:13
13. "Silver e Missie" – 4:25

=== Todo historias ===
1. "Cosas de la vida" – 4:48
2. "A medio camino" – 5:48
3. "Otra como tú" (Spanish version of "Un'altra te") – 4:41
4. "Recuerdos" – 5:23
5. "En compañía" (Spanish version of "In compagnia") – 4:43
6. "Un fuerte no" (Spanish version of "Un grosso no") – 5:39
7. "Fábula" – 4:37
8. "Ya no hay fantasía" (Spanish version of "Non c'è più fantasia") – 3:51
9. "Nostalsong" (Spanish version of "Nostalsong") – 4:30
10. "Nada de malo" (Spanish version of "Niente di male") – 4:05
11. "Éxodos" (Spanish version of "Esodi") – 4:36
12. "La última revolución" (Spanish version of "L'ultima revoluzione") – 4:13
13. "Silver y Missie" (Spanish version of "Silver e Missie") – 4:35

== Charts ==
=== Weekly charts ===
1993–1994 weekly chart performance for Tutte storie
Chart (1993–1994)	Peak
Austrian Albums (Ö3 Austria)	1
Dutch Albums (Album Top 100)	3
European Albums (European Top 100 Albums)	1
Finnish Albums (Suomen virallinen lista)	12
German Albums (Offizielle Top 100)	3
Hungarian Albums (MAHASZ)	10
Italian Albums (Musica e Dischi)	1
Norwegian Albums (VG-lista)	5
Spanish Albums (AFYVE)	1
Swedish Albums (Sverigetopplistan)	4
Swiss Albums (Schweizer Hitparade)	1

=== Year-end charts ===
1993 year-end chart performance for Tutte storie
Chart (1993)	Rank
Austrian Albums (Ö3 Austria)	18
Dutch Albums (Album Top 100)	7
European Albums (European Top 100 Albums)	7
German Albums (Offizielle Top 100)	13
Spanish Albums (AFYVE) Todo historias	13
Swiss Albums (Schweizer Hitparade)	2

1994 year-end chart performance for Tutte storie
Chart (1994)	Rank
European Albums (European Top 100 Albums)	79

== Sales and certifications ==
Sales and certifications for Tutte storie
Region	Certification	Certified units/sales
Argentina (CAPIF) for Todo historias	Platinum	300,000
Austria (IFPI Austria)	Platinum	50,000^{*}
Brazil (Pro-Música Brasil)	Gold	100,000^{*}
Chile	—	160,000
Colombia	—	150,000
Denmark (IFPI Danmark)	Gold	50,000^{^}
France (SNEP)	2× Gold	200,000^{*}
Germany (BVMI)	Platinum	500,000^{^}
Italy	—	1,000,000
Mexico	—	150,000
Netherlands (NVPI)	Platinum	100,000^{^}
Portugal	—	100,000
Spain (PROMUSICAE) for Todo historias	2× Platinum	300,000
Sweden (GLF)	Platinum	100,000^{^}
Switzerland (IFPI Switzerland)	4× Platinum	200,000^{^}
United States (RIAA) for Todo historias	2× Platinum (Latin)	200,000^{^}
Summaries
Europe	—	3,000,000
Worldwide	—	4,000,000
^{*} Sales figures based on certification alone.^{^} Shipments figures based on certification alone.

== See also ==
- List of best-selling albums in Chile
- List of best-selling albums in Colombia
- List of best-selling albums in Italy
- List of best-selling albums in Portugal
