= Cose della vita =

1993 song by Eros Ramazzotti

Single by Eros Ramazzotti

from the album Tutte storie
- Language: Italian
- English title: "Things in Life"
- Released: 4 April 1993
- Genre: Rock
- Length: 4:05
- Songwriters: Eros Ramazzotti; Piero Cassano; Adelio Cogliati
- Producer: Piero Cassano

Eros Ramazzotti singles chronology
"Ancora vita" (1991)	"Cose della vita" (1993)	"Un'altra te" (1993)

Music video
- "Cose della vita" on YouTube

"Cose della vita" (English: "Things in Life") is a song released in April 1993 by Italian singer-songwriter Eros Ramazzotti. It was included on his fifth album, Tutte storie (1993). The single peaked at number one in Belgium and entered the top 10 in Iceland, Spain, and Switzerland. The accompanying music video for the song was directed by Spike Lee.

The song saw an international revival through a bilingual Italian-English version released in late 1997 as a duet with American singer Tina Turner. The additional English lyrics were by James Ralston and Tina Turner herself. The track was included in a later greatest hits compilation album by Ramazzotti titled Eros, released on 28 October 1997.

== Critical reception ==
Pan-European magazine Music & Media wrote, "The intro of 'Cose della vita'—Italian for 'Things of Life'—is unexpectedly rocky, followed by "Spaghetti Western twang" guitar that rolls into one of the finest ballads of the year." Head of music Vranz van Maaren at Sky Radio/Bussum (Holland) cut the rough intro immediately. He said, "Eros is a core artist for our typical ACE outlet, but he shouldn't use that 'quick start' again. We have this beautiful song in medium rotation now, as it is a new record. Depending on what will happen, we might increase rotation levels."

== "Cosas de la vida" ==
As is traditional with many other successful releases of Ramazzotti songs, he released a Spanish language parallel release for Spain, Mexico, Latin America and USA Latin markets titled "Cosas de la vida". That version appears in the parallel Spanish-language version to the album Tutte storie, retitled Todo historias.

== Charts ==
=== Weekly charts ===
Chart (1993)	Peak position
Austria (Ö3 Austria Top 40)	15
Belgium (Ultratop 50 Flanders)	1
Chile (UPI)	3
Colombia (UPI)	8
El Salvador (UPI)	1
Europe (Eurochart Hot 100)	21
Europe (European Hit Radio)	13
France (SNEP)	14
Germany (GfK)	30
Iceland (Íslenski Listinn Topp 40)	9
Netherlands (Dutch Top 40)	11
Netherlands (Single Top 100)	12
Peru (UPI)	6
Spain (AFYVE)	3
Sweden (Sverigetopplistan)	15
Switzerland (Schweizer Hitparade)	7
Uruguay (UPI)	1
US Hot Latin Songs (Billboard)	17

Chart (2013)	Peak position
Slovenia (SloTop50)	37

=== Year-end charts ===
Chart (1993)	Position
Belgium (Ultratop 50 Flanders)	8
Germany (Media Control)	89
Iceland (Íslenski Listinn Topp 40)	92
Netherlands (Dutch Top 40)	72
Netherlands (Single Top 100)	99
Switzerland (Schweizer Hitparade)	9

== Sales ==
Region	Certification	Certified units/sales
France	—	140,000

== Eros Ramazzotti and Tina Turner version ==
"Cose della vita (Can't Stop Thinking of You)"

Single by Eros Ramazzotti and Tina Turner

from the album Eros
- Released: December 1997
- Genre: Rock
- Length: 4:48
- Songwriters: Eros Ramazzotti; Piero Cassano; Adelio Cogliati (Italian lyrics); Tina Turner; James Ralston (additional English lyrics)
- Producer: Eros Ramazzotti

Eros Ramazzotti singles chronology
"Quanto amore sei" (1997)	"Cose della vita (Can't Stop Thinking of You)" (1997)	"Tierra prometida" (1998)

Tina Turner singles chronology
"In Your Wildest Dreams" (1996)	"Cose Della Vita – Can't Stop Thinking of You" (1997)	"When the Heartache Is Over" (1999)

Music video
- "Cose della vita (Can't Stop Thinking of You)" on YouTube

The track was re-recorded by Ramazzotti and American singer and actress Tina Turner, and re-released in December 1997 as a single from Ramazzotti's first greatest hits compilation album, Eros (1997). This time the song was bilingual and retitled "Cose della vita (Can't Stop Thinking of You)". The additional English lyrics were by Turner herself and James Ralston. The re-release was accompanied by a music video shot in September 1997, and directed by Nigel Dick.

The duet version charted better, with a peak in the Netherlands and Germany at number four.

Ramazzotti later re-recorded a Spanish-language version with Turner's English vocals called "Cosas de la Vida – Can't Stop Thinking of You", and a live version of the Italian-English version featuring Tina Turner was included on his album Live.

"Cose Della Vita (Can't Stop Thinking of You)" has been included on Tina Turner's greatest hits albums All the Best (2004) and The Platinum Collection (2009).

=== Critical reception ===
Larry Flick from Billboard magazine wrote, "If you haven't joined the millions of people around the world who happily feast on the suave Italo-belting of Ramazzotti, then you need to catch up. This rock-edged pop chugger from his self-titled album is a good place to start. It shows him at his most magnetic, darting around the track's crisp rhythms and limber electric guitar riffs. The Italian-language tune has been translated into English, allowing special guest Turner to wail and vamp admirably. Her voice meshes perfectly with Ramazzotti's when they harmonize in English—leaving the listener wondering how long it will be before this international star will cut an album specifically for the American market."

=== Charts ===
==== Weekly charts ====
Chart (1997–1998)	Peak position
Austria (Ö3 Austria Top 40)	10
Belgium (Ultratop 50 Flanders)	21
Belgium (Ultratop 50 Wallonia)	8
Croatia International Airplay (HRT)	1
Europe (Eurochart Hot 100)	6
France (SNEP)	6
Germany (GfK)	4
Netherlands (Dutch Top 40)	4
Netherlands (Single Top 100)	4
Norway (VG-lista)	4
Spain (AFYVE)	6
Sweden (Sverigetopplistan)	37
Switzerland (Schweizer Hitparade)	7
US Hot Latin Songs (Billboard)	18

Chart (2016)	Peak position
Poland Airplay (ZPAV)	69

==== Year-end charts ====
Chart (1998)	Position
Belgium (Ultratop 50 Wallonia)	51
Europe (Eurochart Hot 100)	32
France (SNEP)	37
Germany (Media Control)	20
Netherlands (Dutch Top 40)	24
Netherlands (Single Top 100)	29
Norway Vinter Period (VG-lista)	10
Switzerland (Schweizer Hitparade)	23

=== Certifications ===
Region	Certification	Certified units/sales
France (SNEP)	Silver	125,000^{*}
Germany (BVMI)	Gold	300,000^{‡}
Norway (IFPI Norway)	Gold	
Switzerland (IFPI Switzerland)	Gold	25,000^{^}
^{*} Sales figures based on certification alone.^{^} Shipments figures based on certification alone.
