= Terra promessa =

Single by Eros Ramazzotti

from the album Cuori agitati
- B-side: "Bella storia"
- Released: February 3, 1984
- Label: DDD
- Songwriter(s): Eros Ramazzotti, Renato Brioschi, Alberto Salerno
- Producer(s): Renato Brioschi

Eros Ramazzotti singles chronology
"Ad un amico" (1982)	"Terra promessa" (1984)	"Buongiorno bambina" (1984)

Audio
- "Terra promessa" on YouTube

"Terra promessa" (lit. 'Promised land') is a 1984 song composed by Eros Ramazzotti, Renato Brioschi and Alberto Salerno, arranged by Celso Valli and performed by Eros Ramazzotti. With this song Ramazzotti won the newcomers competition at the 34th edition of the Sanremo Music Festival. Originally supposed to be performed by Alessandro Bono, it marked Ramazzotti's breakout and his first commercial success. Mia Martini served as backing vocalist in the studio version of the song. In 1997, Ramazzotti covered the song in Spanish with the title "Tierra prometida".

== Track listing ==
- 7" single

No.	Title	Length
1.	"Terra promessa"	3:35
2.	"Bella storia"	3:40

== Charts ==
Original version
Chart (1984–89)	Peak position
Italy (Musica e dischi)	6
Netherlands (Dutch Top 100)	51
West Germany (Media Control)	74

Eros version
Chart (1998)	Peak position
Netherlands (Dutch Top 100)	84
Switzerland (Schweiz Hitparade)	46
