= Un'emozione per sempre =

Single by Eros Ramazzotti

from the album 9
- Released: 24 April 2003
- Genre: Pop
- Length: 3:59
- Label: Ariola
- Songwriters: Eros Ramazzotti, Claudio Guidetti, Adelio Cogliati, Maurizio Fabrizio
- Producers: Eros Ramazzotti, Claudio Guidetti

Eros Ramazzotti singles chronology
"Per me per sempre" (2001)	"Un'emozione per sempre" (2003)	"Un attimo di pace" (2003)

Music video
- "Un'emozione per sempre" on YouTube

"Un'emozione per sempre" is a song recorded by Italian singer Eros Ramazzotti and released in May 2003 as the lead single from his studio album 9. The song was written by Ramazzotti, Claudio Guidetti, Maurizio Fabrizio and Adelio Cogliati, and it was produced by Ramazzotti and Guidetti.

The single became a commercial success, reaching the top spot of the charts in Italy and Switzerland, and entering the charts in several other European countries. The single was also certified platinum in Italy, with domestic sales exceeding 60,000 units. The Spanish-language version of the song, recorded by Ramazzotti himself and titled "Una emoción para siempre", peaked at number five on the US Billboard Latin Songs chart.

The single's accompanying music video, directed by Martin Weisz, received a nomination for Best Videoclip at the Italian Music Awards in October 2003.

== Background ==
"Un'emozione per sempre" is a love song, dealing with the feelings of somebody facing the end of a relationship and describing the emotions that the lovestory leaves in his life. Il Corriere della Sera's Mario Luzzatto Fegiz described the song as "a sunny and catchy tune, in Ramazzotti's typical style", in which he sings about a man that, despite his instinct to use bitter and painful words with his former partner, prefers to remember the happy moments he lived during the relationship.

Ramazzotti, who had separated a few months earlier from Swiss televeision hostess and model Michelle Hunziker, denied the song was inspired by his personal life, claiming it was written before the end of his marriage, and initially recorded as an unreleased demo by Italian singer Alex Baroni, shortly before the end of the relationship between Baroni and fellow singer Giorgia.

== Artwork ==
The front cover of the single features a photograph by Fabrizio Ferri, showing Ramazzotti's shoulders and highlighting the tattoo on the back of his neck, representing some Japanese ideographs meaning "Michelle", the name of his former wife, Michelle Hunziker. Hunziker denied speculations that the tattoo was an attempt by Ramazzotti to reconquer her love, claiming it was made before the beginning of their sentimental crisis.

== Track listing ==
- CD single
1. "Un'emozione per sempre" (Eros Ramazzotti, Claudio Guidetti, Adelio Cogliati, Maurizio Fabrizio) – 3:59
2. "Una emoción para siempre" (Eros Ramazzotti, Claudio Guidetti, Adelio Cogliati, Maurizio Fabrizio) – 3:59
3. "Un angelo non è" (Live) (Eros Ramazzotti, Claudio Guidetti, Adelio Cogliati) – 5:22

== Charts ==
=== Weekly charts ===
Chart (2003)	Peak position
Austria (Ö3 Austria Top 40)	31
Belgium (Ultratop 50 Flanders)	36
Belgium (Ultratop 50 Wallonia)	25
Croatia (HRT)	1
France (SNEP)	61
Germany (GfK)	35
Hungary (Rádiós Top 40)	1
Italy (FIMI)	1
Netherlands (Dutch Top 40 Tipparade)	12
Netherlands (Single Top 100)	43
Romania (Romanian Top 100)	7
Switzerland (Schweizer Hitparade)	1
US Hot Latin Songs (Billboard)	5
US Latin Pop Airplay (Billboard)	6

=== Year-end charts ===
Chart (2003)	Position
Italy (FIMI)	7
Romania (Romanian Top 100)	84
Switzerland (Schweizer Hitparade)	32

== Certifications ==
Region	Certification	Certified units/sales
Italy (FIMI) Since 2009	Gold	35,000^{‡}
^{‡} Sales+streaming figures based on certification alone.

== Release history ==
Region	Date	Format	Label
Italy	24 April 2003	Radio airplay	Ariola
Italy	9 May 2003	CD single	Ariola
