= Adesso tu =

1986 single by Eros Ramazzotti

Single by Eros Ramazzotti

from the album Nuovi eroi
- Language: Italian
- B-side: "Un nuovo amore"
- Released: 1986
- Genre: Pop
- Length: 4:00
- Label: DDD
- Songwriters: Eros Ramazzotti; Piero Cassano; Adelio Cogliati
- Producer: Piero Cassano

Eros Ramazzotti singles chronology
| "Una storia importante" (1985) | "Adesso tu" (1986) | "Un cuore con le ali" (1986) |

Music video
- "Adesso tu" on YouTube

"Adesso tu" is a 1986 Italian song composed by Eros Ramazzotti, Piero Cassano and Adelio Cogliati and performed by Eros Ramazzotti. The song won the 36th edition of the Sanremo Music Festival.

The semi-autobiographical lyrics were eventually reprised in "Rivincita", a 2010 single by Marracash featuring Giusy Ferreri.

== Track listing and formats ==
- Italian 7-inch single

A. "Adesso tu" – 4:00
B. "Un nuovo amore" – 4:00

== Charts ==
Weekly chart performance for "Adesso tu"
| Chart (1986) | Peak position |
|---|---|
| Austria (Ö3 Austria Top 40) | 1 |
| Italy (Musica e dischi) | 1 |
| Switzerland (Schweizer Hitparade) | 1 |

== Certifications and sales ==
| Region | Certification | Certified units/sales |
|---|---|---|
| Italy (FIMI) | Gold | 300,000 |

== See also ==
- List of number-one hits of 1986 (Italy)
- List of number-one singles of the 1980s (Switzerland)
