= Una storia importante =

Single by Eros Ramazzotti

from the album Cuori agitati
- B-side: "Respiro nel blu"
- Released: February 1985
- Label: DDD
- Songwriters: Eros Ramazzotti; Piero Cassano; Adelio Cogliati
- Producer: Piero Cassano

Eros Ramazzotti singles chronology
| "Buongiorno bambina" (1984) | "Una storia importante" (1985) | "Adesso tu" (1986) |

Audio
- "Una storia importante" on YouTube

"Una storia importante" ('An important [love] story') is a 1985 song composed by Eros Ramazzotti, Piero Cassano and Adelio Cogliati, arranged by Celso Valli and performed by Eros Ramazzotti. With this song Ramazzotti returned at the Sanremo Music Festival after winning the newcomers competition the previous year; the song placed only sixth, but was the most commercially successful among the competing entries. The single sold over one million copies, notably selling over 625,000 copies in France.

== Track listing ==
Single track listing
| No. | Title | Length |
|---|---|---|
| 1. | "Una storia importante" | 3:35 |
| 2. | "Respiro nel blu" | 3:25 |

== Charts ==
Chart performance for original version
| Chart (1985–86) | Peak position |
|---|---|
| Italy (Musica e dischi) | 1 |
| France (SNEP) | 2 |
| Switzerland (Schweiz Hitparade) | 7 |

== Certifications ==
Certifications for "Una storia importante"
| Region | Certification | Certified units/sales |
|---|---|---|
| Italy (FIMI) Sales from 2009 | Gold | 50,000^{‡} |
^{‡} Sales+streaming figures based on certification alone.
