= Adelio Cogliati =

Italian lyricist and record producer (1948–2018)

- Born: 10 July 1948; Milan, Italy
- Died: 29 December 2018 (aged 70); Milan, Italy
- Years active: 1964–2018

Adelio Cogliati (10 July 1948 – 29 December 2018) was an Italian lyricist and record producer.

== Life and career ==
Born in Milan, Cogliati started his music career in 1964 as a member of some local musical groups. He is mainly known for his professional association with pop singer Eros Ramazzotti, for whom he co-write, often together with Piero Cassano, some major hits including "Una storia importante", "Cose della vita", "Più bella cosa", "Più che puoi", "Un'emozione per sempre", and "L’Aurora". He won the Sanremo Music Festival twice, in 1986 with Ramazzotti's "Adesso tu" and in 1995 with Giorgia's "Come saprei". His collaborations include Andrea Bocelli, Luciano Pavarotti, Mina, Zucchero Fornaciari, Gianni Morandi, Ricchi e Poveri, Anna Oxa, Patty Pravo, Caterina Caselli, Marcella Bella, Amedeo Minghi, Matia Bazar, Drupi, Iva Zanicchi, Miguel Bosé, Dori Ghezzi, I Camaleonti, Antonella Ruggiero, Loretta Goggi, Filippa Giordano, and Gianni Togni.
