= Rondò Veneziano discography =

- Studio albums: 25
- Soundtrack albums: 1
- Live albums: 2
- Compilation albums: 44
- Video albums: 1

The discography of Italian chamber orchestra Rondò Veneziano includes twenty-five studio albums, one soundtrack, two live albums, forty-four compilations and one video album. The orchestra's album sales exceeded 30 million in 2017.

== Albums ==
=== Studio albums ===
| Title | Album details | Peak chart positions | | | | | | | | | | Certifications |
| Title | Album details | ITA | AUS | AUT | EU | FRA | GER | NED | SPA | SWI | UK | Certifications |
|---|---|---|---|---|---|---|---|---|---|---|---|---|
| Rondò veneziano (a.k.a. The Genius of Venice) | Released: 1980; Label: Baby Records; Formats: LP, MC, CD, digital | 3 | — | — | — | — | 32 | 23 | — | — | 60 | |
| La Serenissima (a.k.a. Venice in Peril) | Released: 1981; Label: Baby Records; Formats: LP, MC, CD, digital | 8 | 37 | — | — | — | — | — | — | — | 34 | BPI: Gold |
| Scaramucce | Released: 1982; Label: Baby Records; Formats: LP, MC, CD, digital | 14 | — | — | — | — | 33 | — | — | — | — | |
| Odissea veneziana (a.k.a. L'odyssée de Venise and Odissea) | Released: 1984; Label: Baby Records; Formats: LP, MC, CD, digital | 5 | — | 7 | 19 | 17 | 3 | — | — | 1 | — | |
| Casanova (a.k.a. Odissea veneziana) | Released: 1985; Label: Baby Records; Formats: LP, MC, CD, digital | 6 | — | — | 71 | 12 | — | — | 9 | 1 | — | IFPI Austria: Gold; BVMI: Gold; SNEP: Gold |
| Rapsodia veneziana (a.k.a. Fantasia veneziana and Lagune) | Released: 1986; Label: Baby Records; Formats: LP, MC, CD, digital | 12 | — | 15 | 26 | — | 4 | — | — | 1 | — | IFPI Austria: Gold; BVMI: Gold; IFPI Switzerland: Platinum |
| Arabesque (a.k.a. Misteriosa Venezia) | Released: 1987; Label: Baby Records; Formats: LP, MC, CD, digital | 16 | — | 14 | 6 | 7 | 1 | — | — | 2 | — | IFPI Austria: Gold; BVMI: Platinum |
| Concerto (a.k.a. Poesia di Venezia and Splendore di Venezia) | Released: 1988; Label: Baby Records; Formats: LP, MC, CD, digital | — | — | — | 28 | 3 | 8 | 96 | — | 1 | — | IFPI Austria: Gold; BVMI: Gold |
| Masquerade (a.k.a. Visioni di Venezia and Armonie) | Released: 30 September 1989; Label: Baby Records; Formats: LP, MC, CD, digital | — | — | — | 22 | 4 | 10 | 60 | — | 4 | — | BVMI: Gold |
| Barocco (a.k.a. Capriccio veneziano, Musica... Fantasia and Mystère) | Released: November 1990; Label: Baby Records; Formats: LP, MC, CD, digital | 18 | — | — | 48 | 8 | 21 | — | — | 4 | — | BVMI: Gold |
| The Genius of Vivaldi (a.k.a. Concerto per Vivaldi and Le génie de Vivaldi) | Released: 1990; Label: Baby Records; Formats: LP, MC, CD, digital | — | — | — | — | 32 | — | — | — | 11 | — | |
| The Genius of Mozart (a.k.a. Concerto per Mozart and Le génie de Mozart) | Released: 1990; Label: Baby Records; Formats: LP, MC, CD, digital | — | — | — | 42 | 26 | 14 | — | — | 11 | — | |
| The Genius of Beethoven (a.k.a. Concerto per Beethoven and Le génie de Beethoven) | Released: 1990; Label: Baby Records; Formats: LP, MC, CD, digital | — | — | — | — | — | — | — | — | 11 | — | |
| Prestige (a.k.a. Interlude and Magica melodia) | Released: 1991; Label: Baby Records; Formats: LP, MC, CD, digital | — | — | — | 84 | 24 | 27 | — | — | 4 | — | |
| G. P. Reverberi – Rondò Veneziano (a.k.a. Stagioni di Venezia) | Released: October 1992; Label: DDD – La Drogueria di Drugolo; Formats: LP, MC, CD, digital | — | — | — | 66 | 14 | 70 | — | — | — | — | |
| L'antivirtuoso by Gian Piero Reverberi | Released: 1993; Label: DDD – La Drogueria di Drugolo; Formats: CD | — | — | — | — | — | — | — | — | — | — | |
| Il mago di Venezia | Released: 1994; Label: DDD – La Drogueria di Drugolo; Formats: CD, MC, digital | — | — | — | — | — | — | — | — | — | — | |
| Sinfonia di Natale (a.k.a. Symphonie de Noël and Weihnachten mit Rondò Veneziano – Sinfonia di Natale) | Released: 1995; Label: DDD – La Drogueria di Drugolo; Formats: CD, MC, digital | — | — | — | 68 | — | 15 | — | — | — | — | |
| Marco Polo | Released: 1997; Label: Koch International; Formats: CD, MC | — | — | — | — | — | 52 | — | — | 13 | — | |
| Zodiaco – Sternzeichen (a.k.a. Zodiaco and Zodiaco – The Zodiac) | Released: 1998; Label: Koch International; Formats: CD, MC | — | — | — | — | — | — | — | — | 35 | — | |
| Attimi di magia – Magische Augenblicke (a.k.a. Attimi di magia) | Released: 1999; Label: Koch Records; Formats: CD, MC | — | — | — | — | — | — | — | — | — | — | |
| Honeymoon – Luna di miele | Released: 1999; Label: Koch Records; Formats: CD, MC | — | — | — | — | — | — | — | — | 47 | — | |
| La storia del classico | Released: 2000; Label: Koch Records; Formats: CD | — | — | — | — | — | — | — | — | 63 | — | |
| Papagena (a.k.a. Vénitienne) | Released: 2001; Label: Baby Records International; Formats: CD | — | — | — | — | 38 | 73 | — | — | 91 | — | |
| La Piazza (a.k.a. Concertissimo) | Released: 2002; Label: Baby Records International; Formats: CD, MC, digital | — | — | — | — | 93 | 67 | — | — | — | — | |
| Chamber Orchestra | Released: 2009; Label: Cleo Music AG; Formats: CD | — | — | — | — | — | — | — | — | — | — | |
"—" denotes a recording that did not chart or was not released in that territory.

=== Live albums ===
| Title | Album details |
|---|---|
| Gian Piero Reverberi Conducts Rondò Veneziano – In concerto | Released: 30 May 1997; Label: Koch International; Formats: CD |
| 25 – Live in Concert | Released: 2005; Label: Cleo Music AG; Formats: CD |

=== Compilation albums ===
| Title | Album details | Peak chart positions | | | | | | | Certifications |
| Title | Album details | ITA | AUT | EU | FRA | GER | NED | SWI | Certifications |
|---|---|---|---|---|---|---|---|---|---|
| Il meglio di Rondò Veneziano | Released: /; Label: Reader's Digest; Formats: CD | — | — | — | — | — | — | — | |
| Notturno in gondola | Released: 1981; Label: Baby Records; Formats: LP, MC | — | — | — | — | — | — | — | |
| Venezia 2000 (a.k.a. Hooked on Venice, Venise de l'an 2000) | Released: 1983; Label: Baby Records; Formats: LP, MC, CD, digital | 3 | — | 43 | 24 | 2 | 41 | 1 | IFPI Austria: Gold; BVMI: Gold; IFPI Switzerland: 2× Platinum |
| Concerto futurissimo | Released: 1984; Label: Baby Records; Formats: LP, MC, CD, digital | — | 5 | 39 | — | 7 | — | — | |
| Fantasia veneziana | Released: 1985; Label: Baby Records; Formats: LP | — | — | — | — | — | — | — | |
| Lo mejor de Rondò Veneziano | Released: 1987; Label: Musart; Formats: LP, MC | — | — | — | — | — | — | — | |
| Rondò 2000 – The Best of Rondò Veneziano | Released: 1992; Label: Baby Records; Formats: CD, MC | 14 | — | 53 | — | — | — | 10 | |
| Venezia romantica – The Best of Rondò Veneziano (a.k.a. Venezia romantica – Das Schönste von Rondò Veneziano) | Released: 1992; Label: Baby Records; Formats: LP, CD, MC, digital | — | — | — | — | 46 | — | — | |
| Eine Nacht in Venedig | Released: 1995; Label: Ariola Express, BMG; Formats: CD, MC | — | — | — | — | — | — | — | |
| I grandi successi – Vol. 1 (Series: Linea tre and Orizzonte) | Released: 1995; Label: Ariola, BMG; Formats: CD, MC | — | — | — | — | — | — | — | |
| Romanza veneziana | Released: 1995; Label: BMG; Formats: CD | — | — | — | — | — | — | — | |
| Preludio all'amore – All the Romantic Hits | Released: 1996; Label: Ariola Express, BMG; Formats: CD, MC | — | — | — | — | — | — | — | |
| The Best of Rondò Veneziano – Vol. 1 (a.k.a. L'essentiel) | Released: 1996; Label: BMG; Formats: CD, MC, digital | — | — | — | 12 | 89 | — | — | |
| Seduzione | Released: 1996; Label: BMG, RCA; Formats: CD, MC | — | — | — | — | — | — | — | |
| I grandi successi – Vol. 2 (Series: Linea tre and Orizzonte) | Released: 1996; Label: Ariola, BMG; Formats: CD, MC | — | — | — | — | — | — | — | |
| Fantasia classica | Released: 1997; Label: Ariola, BMG; Formats: CD, digital | — | — | — | — | — | — | — | |
| Die Großen Erfolge | Released: 1997; Label: BMG, RCA Victor; Formats: CD | — | — | — | — | — | — | — | |
| Via dell'amore | Released: 1997; Label: Ariola, BMG; Formats: CD, digital | — | — | — | — | — | — | — | |
| I grandi successi [– Vol. 3] (Series: Musicatua) | Released: 1997; Label: RCA; Formats: CD, MC | — | — | — | — | — | — | — | |
| Fantasia d'autunno – Fantasien zur Herbstzeit | Released: 1998; Label: Ariola, BMG; Formats: CD, digital | — | — | — | — | — | — | — | |
| Fantasia d'inverno – Fantasien zur Winterzeit | Released: 1998; Label: Ariola, BMG; Formats: CD, digital | — | — | — | — | — | — | — | |
| Fantasia di primavera – Fantasien zur Frühlingszeit | Released: 1999; Label: Ariola, BMG; Formats: CD, digital | — | — | — | — | — | — | — | |
| Fantasia d'estate – Fantasien zur Sommerzeit | Released: 1999; Label: Ariola, BMG; Formats: CD, digital | — | — | — | — | — | — | — | |
| Rondò Veneziano [– Vol. 1] (Series: Protagonisti) (a.k.a. Rondò Veneziano [Series: Gold Italia Collection], 2006) | Released: 1999; Label: BMG Ricordi, Harmony, RCA, Sony BMG; Formats: CD, MC | — | — | — | — | — | — | — | |
| Die Größten Hits [– Vol. 1] (Series: Nur das Beste) | Released: 2000; Label: Ariola, BMG; Formats: CD, digital | — | — | — | — | — | — | — | |
| Rondò Veneziano (Series: I grandi successi originali – Flashback) | Released: 2000; Label: BMG Ricordi, RCA Italiana; Formats: CD, digital | — | — | — | — | — | — | — | |
| Rondò Veneziano – Vol. 2 (Series: Protagonisti) | Released: 2000; Label: BMG Ricordi, Harmony; Formats: CD | — | — | — | — | — | — | — | |
| The Very Best of Rondò Veneziano | Released: 2000; Label: Camden, BMG, Sony; Formats: CD, MC, digital | — | — | — | — | — | — | — | |
| The Magic of Christmas | Released: 2001; Label: Ariola Express, BMG; Formats: CD, MC, digital | — | — | — | — | — | — | — | |
| Die Größten Hits – Vol. 2 (Series: Nur das Beste) | Released: 2004; Label: Sony BMG; Formats: CD, digital | — | — | — | — | — | — | — | |
| Concerto d'amore | Released: 2005; Label: Sony BMG; Formats: CD, digital | — | — | — | — | — | — | — | |
| Der Zauber Italiens | Released: 2005; Label: Sony BMG; Formats: CD, digital | — | — | — | — | — | — | — | |
| Magische Momente – 25 Jahre | Released: 2005; Label: Sony BMG; Formats: CD, digital | — | — | — | — | — | — | — | |
| Masterpieces | Released: 2005; Label: Sony BMG; Formats: CD, digital | — | — | — | — | — | — | — | |
| Rondò Veneziano (Series: Flashback Collection) | Released: 2005; Label: Sony BMG, RCA; Formats: CD | 47 | — | — | — | — | — | — | |
| Ein Romantische Konzert | Released: 2006; Label: Reader's Digest, Sony BMG; Formats: CD, digital | — | — | — | — | — | — | — | |
| Rondò Veneziano (Series: Superissimi – Gli eroi del Juke box) | Released: 2006; Label: Sony BMG; Formats: CD, digital | — | — | — | — | — | — | — | |
| Gold Stücke | Released: 2007; Label: Sony; Formats: CD, digital | — | — | — | — | — | — | — | |
| Rondò Veneziano (Series: Collections) | Released: 2009; Label: Sony; Formats: CD | — | — | — | — | — | — | — | |
| I grandi successi [– Vol. 4] (Series: Flashback) | Released: 2011; Label: RCA; Formats: CD, digital | 98 | — | — | — | — | — | — | FIMI: Gold |
| The Best of Rondò Veneziano | Released: 2011; Label: Prodisc; Formats: CD | — | — | — | — | — | — | — | |
| Rondò Veneziano (Series: Best of 3CD) | Released: 2012; Label: Sony; Formats: CD, digital | — | — | — | 153 | — | — | — | |
| Rondò Veneziano (Series: Un'ora con...) | Released: 2013; Label: RCA, Sony; Formats: CD, digital | — | — | — | — | — | — | — | |
| Greatest Hits (a.k.a. La Piazza) | Released: 2022; Label: ZYX Music; Formats: LP | — | — | — | — | — | — | — | |
| Rondò Veneziano (Series: Zeitlos) | Released: 2025; Label: More Music and Media; Formats: CD | — | — | — | — | — | — | — | |
"—" denotes a recording that did not chart or was not released in that territory.

=== Box sets ===
| Title | Album details |
|---|---|
| Fantasia veneziana | Released: /; Label: Fanfare Records; Formats: CD |
| Le prestige de Rondò Veneziano | Released: /; Label: Ariola, BMG; Formats: CD |
| Rapsodia veneziana – Concerto futurissimo | Released: /; Label: Ex Libris, Baby Records; Formats: CD |
| Scaramucce – Concerto futurissimo (Series: Back 2 Back) | Released: 1995; Label: Ariola, BMG; Formats: CD |
| Scaramucce – Poesia di Venezia – Concerto per Mozart (Series: Coffret 3 CD) | Released: 1998; Label: Ariola, BMG; Formats: CD |
| Frühlingszeit – Primavera | Released: 2003; Label: ZYX Music; Formats: CD |
| Rondò Veneziano spielt Wolfgang Amadeus Mozart, Ludwig van Beethoven, Antonio Vivaldi | Released: 2004; Label: BMG; Formats: CD, digital |
| Buon Natale | Released: 2005; Label: ZYX Music; Formats: CD |
| Concertissimo – The Gold Collection | Released: 2005; Label: Musart; Formats: CD |

=== Soundtrack albums ===
| Title | Album details |
|---|---|
| Not Quite Jerusalem | Released: 1985; Label: Fanfare Records; Formats: LP, MC |

=== Video albums ===
| Title | Album details |
|---|---|
| Once Upon a Time – A Musical DVD Odissee | Released: 2010; Label: FlynnFilm; Formats: DVD |

== Singles ==
=== Singles and promotional singles ===
| Title | Year | Album |
|---|---|---|
| Rondò veneziano | Released: 1980; Label: Baby Records, CBS | Rondò veneziano (Spain) |
| Rondò veneziano/San Marco | Released: 1980; Label: Baby Records, Barclay | Rondò veneziano (Belgium and France) |
| San Marco/Rondò veneziano | Released: 1980; Label: Baby Records, Emi Electrola | Rondò veneziano (Germany) |
| San Marco/Colombina | Released: 1980; Label: Baby Records | Rondò veneziano (Japan) |
| La Serenisima/Capricho veneziano | Released: 1981; Label: Musart | La Serenissima (Mexico) |
| La Serenissima – Theme From Venice in Peril | Released: 1983; Label: Ferroway Records, RCA | Venice in Peril (Ireland and United Kingdom) |
| San Marco | Released: 1983; Label: Baby Records | Venezia 2000 (Germany) |
| La Serenissima – Theme From Venice in Peril | Released: 1984; Label: Musart | Venice in Peril (Mexico) |
| San Marco | Released: 1984; Label: Ferroway Records | The Genius of Venice (United Kingdom) |
| The Love Theme from Not Quite Jerusalem | Released: 1984; Label: Fanfare Records | Not Quite Jerusalem (United Kingdom) |
| Tiziano | Released: 1984; Label: Baby Records | Odissea veneziana (Germany) |
| Venice | Released: 1984; Label: Ferroway Records | Venice in Peril (United Kingdom) |
| Casanova | Released: 1985; Label: Baby Records | Casanova (Belgium) |
| Odissea | Released: 1985; Label: Fanfare Records | Odissea (United Kingdom) |
| Odissea veneziana/Casanova | Released: 1986; Label: Baby Records | Odissea veneziana (Germany) |
| Fantasia veneziana/Festa mediterranea | Released: 1986; Label: Baby Records | Fantasia veneziana (Germany) |
| Perle d'oriente/La Giudecca | Released: 1986; Label: Baby Records | Fantasia veneziana (Germany) |
| Arabesque | Released: 1987; Label: Baby Records, Polydor | Arabesque (France) |
| Misteriosa Venezia/Fiaba antica (1a parte) | Released: 1987; Label: Baby Records | Misteriosa Venezia (Germany) |
| La Serenissima – Theme From BBC 1's Hospital Watch | Released: 1988; Label: Fanfare Records | Venice in Peril (United Kingdom) |
| Poesia di Venezia/Seduzione | Released: 1988; Label: Baby Records | Poesia di Venezia (Germany) |
| Visioni di Venezia | Released: 1989; Label: Baby Records | Visioni di Venezia (Germany) |
| Musica... fantasia | Released: 1990; Label: Baby Records | Musica... fantasia (Germany) |
| Magica melodia | Released: 1991; Label: Baby Records | Magica melodia (Germany) |
| Odissea veneziana | Released: 1991; Label: Ariola, BMG | Odissea veneziana (Spain) |
| Casanova | Released: 1992; Label: Ariola, Baby Records | Odissea veneziana (Spain) |
| Poesia di Venezia | Released: 1992; Label: Ariola, Baby Records | Poesia di Venezia (Spain) |
| Stagioni di Venezia/Il palio | Released: 1992; Label: BMG, DDD – La Drogueria di Drugolo | G. P. Reverberi – Rondò Veneziano (France) |
| Pastorale | Released: 1993; Label: Ariola, BMG | Concerto per Beethoven (Germany) |
| Stagioni di Venezia | Released: 1993; Label: BMG Ariola, DDD – La Drogueria di Drugolo | Stagioni di Venezia (Germany) |
| Blu oltremare | Released: 1994; Label: BMG Ariola, DDD – La Drogueria di Drugolo | Il mago di Venezia (Germany) |
| Ein Interview mit Gian Piero Reverberi | Released: 1997; Label: Koch Records | / |
| Marco Polo | Released: 1997; Label: Koch Records | Marco Polo |
| Zodiaco – Sternzeichen | Released: 1998; Label: Koch Records | Zodiaco – Sternzeichen |
| Musica... fantasia | Released: 1999; Label: Koch Records | Attimi di magia – Magische Augenblicke |
| San Zaccaria | Released: 1999; Label: Koch Records | Honeymoon – Luna di miele |
| Album 2000 – La storia del classico | Released: 1999; Label: Koch Records | La storia del classico |
| La Piazza | Released: 2002; Label: ZYX Music | La Piazza |
