= Gian Piero Reverberi Conducts Rondò Veneziano – In concerto =

Live album by Rondò Veneziano
- Released: 30 May 1997
- Studio: DG Studio, Genoa
- Genre: Classical crossover; easy listening
- Length: 48:02
- Label: Koch International
- Producer: Gian Piero Reverberi

Rondò Veneziano chronology
Sinfonia di Natale (1995)	Gian Piero Reverberi Conducts Rondò Veneziano – In concerto (1997)	Marco Polo (1997)

Gian Piero Reverberi Conducts Rondò Veneziano – In concerto is the first live album by Italian chamber orchestra Rondò Veneziano, released in 1997 by Koch International (Austria). It was advertised on Walliser Bote on June 21, 1997 and peacked at number 10 in Switzerland (Hit auf Hit).

== Overview ==
This album, the orchestra's twentieth overall, is divided into four symphonic suites and an encore featuring their most famous compositions. It is a recording of a concert held in Austria on July 31, 1996, at the Kongresshaus in Villach. Rondò Veneziano's first tour took place in 1991 with the same program, conducted by Gian Piero Reverberi and accompanied by the Munich International Orchestra. This was their first attempt at a live album after years of boycott by Baby Records (BMG Ariola).

== Track listing ==
All tracks are written by Gian Piero Reverberi, Laura Giordano (uncredited), Ivano Pavesi (uncredited) and Dario Farina. The track "Arabesque" is titled "Misteriosa Venezia", "Terza suite sinfonica" (with "Tiziano" as ghost track) and "Sesta suite sinfonica" are not separate but combined into a single track.

1. "Terza suite sinfonica": "Seduzione", "Tiziano", "Casanova", "Aria di festa" – 6:37
2. "Sesta suite sinfonica": "Gentil tenzone", "Estasi veneziana", "Odissea veneziana" – 8:26
3. "Prima suite sinfonica": "La Giudecca", "Arabesco", "Arazzi", "Scaramucce" – 14:00
4. "Quinta suita sinfonica": "Notturno in gondola", "Danza mediterranea", "Notte amalfitana", "Sinfonia per un addio", "Notte amalfitana" (Reprise), "Splendore di Venezia" – 18:09
5. Encore: "Isole", "Misteriosa Venezia", "Barocco" – 9:05

== Personnel ==
- Gian Piero Reverberi – arrangement, conducting, piano, production
- Franco Fochesato – sound engineer
- Luciano Serena – stage sound engineer
- Karlheinz Köpfle – artwork
- Studio Koch – cover art

Credits are adapted from the album's liner notes.

== Charts ==
Chart performance for Gian Piero Reverberi Conducts Rondò Veneziano – In concerto
Chart (1997)	Peak position
Swiss Koch International Albums (Hit auf Hit)	10
