= Venezia romantica – The Best of Rondò Veneziano =

Compilation album by Rondò Veneziano
- Released: 1992
- Studio: Country Lane, Munich
- Genre: Classical crossover; Easy listening
- Label: Baby
- Producer: Gian Piero Reverberi

Rondò Veneziano chronology
Rondò 2000 – The Best of Rondò Veneziano (1992)	Venezia romantica – The Best of Rondò Veneziano (1992)	Eine Nacht in Venedig (1995)

Venezia romantica – The Best of Rondò Veneziano is a compilation album by the Italian chamber orchestra Rondò Veneziano, released in 1992 by Baby Records. The album was released in Germany with the subtitle Das Schönste von Rondò Veneziano, where it reached 46th place in the chart.

== Critical reception ==
Professional ratings
Review scores
Source	Rating
AllMusic	2.5/5 stars

Rodney Batdorf from AllMusic wrote: "Venezia Romantica is an engagingly romantic collection of light classical music".

== Track listing ==
No.	Title	Music	Length
1.	"Splendore di Venezia" (from the album Concerto)	Gian Piero Reverberi, Ivano Pavesi	2:38
2.	"Casanova" (from the album Casanova)	Gian Piero Reverberi, Laura Giordano	3:06
3.	"Bettina" (from the album Casanova)	Gian Piero Reverberi, Laura Giordano	3:11
4.	"Divertissement" (from the album Barocco)	Gian Piero Reverberi, Laura Giordano	3:19
5.	"Armonie" (from the album Arabesque)	Gian Piero Reverberi, Laura Giordano	2:36
6.	"Regata dei dogi" (from the album La Serenissima)	Gian Piero Reverberi, Laura Giordano	2:52
7.	"Perle d'oriente" (from the album Rapsodia veneziana)	Gian Piero Reverberi, Laura Giordano	2:46
8.	"Pulcinella" (from the album Scaramucce)	Gian Piero Reverberi, Laura Giordano	4:01
9.	"Prestige" (from the album Prestige)	Gian Piero Reverberi, Ivano Pavesi	3:25
10.	"Corso delle gondole" (from the album Arabesque)	Gian Piero Reverberi, Laura Giordano	2:25
11.	"Le dame, i cavalieri" (from the album Barocco)	Gian Piero Reverberi, Ivano Pavesi	2:53
12.	"Donna Lucrezia" (from the album Casanova)	Gian Piero Reverberi, Laura Giordano	2:59
13.	"La Giudecca" (from the album Rapsodia veneziana)	Gian Piero Reverberi, Laura Giordano	2:48
14.	"Tramonto d'autunno" (from the album Concerto)	Gian Piero Reverberi, Ivano Pavesi	3:44
15.	"Carrousel" (from the album Concerto)	Gian Piero Reverberi, Ivano Pavesi	3:31
16.	"Rialto" (from the album La Serenissima)	Gian Piero Reverberi, Laura Giordano	3:01

== Personnel ==
- Gian Piero Reverberi – arrangement, conducting, production
- Angus McKie – cover art
- Jesús Eduardo Álvarez Herrera – classical guitar
- Harry Thumann – sound engineer
- Klaus Strazicky – sound engineer

Credits are adapted from the album's liner notes.

== Charts ==
Chart performance for Venezia romantica – The Best of Rondò Veneziano
Chart (1993)	Peak position
German Albums (Offizielle Top 100)	46
