= Attimi di magia – Magische Augenblicke =

Studio album by Rondò Veneziano
- Released: 28 May 1999
- Studio: Studio Mulinetti, Recco; Esagono Recording Studio, Rubiera; Arco Studio, Munich; DG Studio, Genoa
- Genre: Classical crossover; easy listening
- Length: 52:35
- Label: Koch Records
- Producer: Gian Piero Reverberi

Rondò Veneziano chronology
| Zodiaco – Sternzeichen (1998) | Attimi di magia – Magische Augenblicke (1999) | Honeymoon – Luna di miele (1999) |

Attimi di magia – Magische Augenblicke is the twenty-second studio album by Italian chamber orchestra Rondò Veneziano, released in 1999 by Koch Records (Austria). In Italy it was re-released with a slightly modified cover in 2008 by Deltadischi as Attimi di magia.

== Overview ==
This album features some famous pieces from Rondò Veneziano's repertoire, re-arranged and re-adapted mainly based on the piano solo versions from Gian Piero Reverberi's album L'antivirtuoso (1993). It also includes three previously unreleased pieces.

== Track listing ==
All tracks are written by Gian Piero Reverberi and Laura Giordano, except where noted.

| No. | Title | Music | Length |
|---|---|---|---|
| 1. | "Carrousel" | Gian Piero Reverberi, Ivano Pavesi | 3:03 |
| 2. | "Musica... fantasia" | | 2:49 |
| 3. | "Damsels" | Gian Piero Reverberi, Ivano Pavesi | 3:19 |
| 4. | "Perle d'oriente" (based on the piano solo version from the album L'antivirtuoso) | | 2:49 |
| 5. | "Attimi di magia" (unreleased track) | Gian Piero Reverberi, Ivano Pavesi | 3:00 |
| 6. | "Pulcinella" | | 5:00 |
| 7. | "Preludio all'amore" | | 3:05 |
| 8. | "Bettina" (based on the piano solo version from the album L'antivirtuoso) | | 2:49 |
| 9. | "Campiello in festa" (unreleased track) | Gian Piero Reverberi, Ivano Pavesi | 4:04 |
| 10. | "Misteriosa Venezia" | | 3:28 |
| 11. | "Prime luci sulla laguna" (based on the piano solo version from the album L'antivirtuoso) | | 3:03 |
| 12. | "Floralis" | Gian Piero Reverberi, Ivano Pavesi | 2:43 |
| 13. | "Casanova" (based on the piano solo version from the album L'antivirtuoso) | | 2:58 |
| 14. | "Gondole" | | 4:57 |
| 15. | "Mosaico" | | 3:42 |
| 16. | "Addio a Venezia" (unreleased track) | Gian Piero Reverberi, Ivano Pavesi | 1:41 |

== Personnel ==
- Gian Piero Reverberi – piano, arrangement, conducting, production
- Koch Graphic Studio – artwork
- Victor Togliani – cover art
- Sergio Barlozzi – drumset, sound engineer, mixing
- Andrea Rovacchi – sound engineer, mixing (assistant)
- Franco Fochesato – sound engineer (additional sounds), editing, mastering
- Alberto Parodi – sound engineer
- Klaus Strazicky – sound engineer

Credits are adapted from the album's liner notes.
