= Papagena (album) =

Studio album by Rondò Veneziano
- Released: 26 November 2001
- Studio: Park Studio, Tutzing; DG Studio, Genoa; Zerodieci Studio, Genoa; Undergroundstudio, Genoa
- Genre: Classical crossover; easy listening
- Length: 38:48
- Label: Baby
- Producer: Gian Piero Reverberi

Rondò Veneziano chronology
La storia del classico (2000)	Papagena (2001)	La Piazza (2002)

Alternative cover
- France release as Vénitienne

Papagena is the twenty-fifth studio album by Italian chamber orchestra Rondò Veneziano, released in 2001 by Baby Records International. In France the album was released as Vénitienne by EMI with a different track list. The album peaked at number 38 in France, 73 in Germany and 91 in Switzerland.

== Overview ==
As detailed in the booklet, the album represents the inspirations behind the tracks, drawn from the emotions of various places visited by Gian Piero Reverberi: "Papagena" reminds him of his first time listening to Wolfgang Amadeus Mozart's The Magic Flute; "Désirée," the name of a young French woman, evokes his first stay in Paris; "Il Balcone di Giulietta" recalls a visit to Verona; "Puerta del Sol" brings back memories of his first trip to Madrid; "La Grotta Azzurra" reflects a short holiday in Capri; "Dopo il concerto" captures his feelings and emotions after listening to a symphony by Johannes Brahms; "Il battistero" depicts the magic and awe he felt before the stained-glass windows of the Kaiser Wilhelm Memorial Church in Berlin, made radiant by the sunlight; "Rifugio alpino" portrays the enchantment of a summer night spent in the mountains; "Désir d’amour" represents the crescendo of a passionate love story; "Viale Rossini" recalls a stroll along an avenue after an evening spent with friends; and "Alba sul mare" captures the reflections of light dancing on the sea’s surface, playfully and almost indescribably illuminating a room in Gladsax, Sweden.

== Track listing ==
All tracks are written by Gian Piero Reverberi and Ivano Pavesi, except where noted. The track "Siciliana (Suite per armonica e archi)" is taken from Willi Burger's album Harmonica (Baby Records, BR 56110, 1987). In the French version the track "Papagena" is renamed as "Vénitienne" and "Désirée" has a different intro.

=== Papagena (International) ===
No.	Title	Music	Length
1.	"Papagena"		3:04
2.	"Désirée"		3:22
3.	"Il Balcone di Giulietta"		3:47
4.	"Puerta del Sol"		3:44
5.	"La Grotta Azzurra"		3:35
6.	"Dopo il concerto"		2:53
7.	"Il battistero"		4:00
8.	"Rifugio alpino"		4:16
9.	"Désir d'amour"		2:37
10.	"Viale Rossini"		2:59
11.	"Alba sul mare"		3:31
12.	"Siciliana (Suite per armonica e archi)"	Gian Piero Reverberi	3:00

=== Vénitienne (France) ===
No.	Title	Length
1.	"Palazzo Fortuny" (from the album Honeymoon – Luna di miele)	5:19
2.	"Puerta del Sol"	4:44
3.	"Désir d'amour"	2:37
4.	"I preparativi" (from the album Marco Polo)	2:46
5.	"Vénitienne"	3:04
6.	"Il Balcone di Giulietta"	3:47
7.	"Viale Rossini"	2:59
8.	"Désirée" (different intro)	3:22
9.	"Rifugio alpino"	4:16
10.	"La Grotta Azzurra"	3:35
11.	"Dopo il concerto"	2:53
12.	"Mercatino" (from the album Honeymoon – Luna di miele)	3:00
13.	"Alba sul mare"	3:31

== Personnel ==
- Gian Piero Reverberi – additional sounds, arrangement, conducting, mixing, production
- Patrizio Guidich a.k.a. Fabrizio Giudice – classical guitar (4)
- Willi Burger – chromatic harmonica (12)
- Sinfonie Orchestra Ljubljana – orchestra (12)
- Nevio Zanardi – conductor (12)
- Ricky Andreoni – cover art
- Victor Togliani – cover art
- Franco Fochesato – mixing, editing, mastering, sound engineer
- Klaus Strazicky – sound engineer
- Paolo Vannini – sound engineer
- Roberto Vigo – sound engineer

Credits are adapted from the album's liner notes.

== Charts ==
Chart performance for Papagena
Chart (2001)	Peak position
German Albums (Offizielle Top 100)	73
Swiss Albums (Schweizer Hitparade)	91

Chart performance for Vénitienne
Chart (2001)	Peak position
French Albums (SNEP)	93
