= La storia del classico =

Studio album by Rondò Veneziano
- Released: 13 October 2000
- Studio: Studio Mulinetti, Recco; DG Studio, Genoa; Arco Studio, Munich
- Genre: Classical crossover; classical music; easy listening
- Label: Koch Records
- Producer: Gian Piero Reverberi

Rondò Veneziano chronology
Honeymoon – Luna di miele (1999)	La storia del classico (2000)	Papagena (2001)

La storia del classico is the twenty-fourth studio album by Italian chamber orchestra Rondò Veneziano, released in 2000 by Koch Records (Austria). The album peaked at number 63 in Switzerland.

== Overview ==
This is the third cover album by Rondò Veneziano, drawn from the classical repertoire, a choice already tested with the albums The Genius of Vivaldi, Mozart, Beethoven (1990) and Sinfonia di Natale (1995).

== Track listing ==
All tracks are arranged by Ivano Pavesi and conducted by Gian Piero Reverberi.

No.	Title	Music	Length
1.	"Concerto sinfonico"	"Fantaisie-Impromptu, Op. posth. 66", "Étude, Op. 10, No. 12" (Frédéric Chopin), "Romeo and Juliet" (Pyotr Ilyich Tchaikovsky), "Martha: Ach so fromm" (Friedrich von Flotow)	9:53
2.	"Concerto solare"	"Peer Gynt: Suite No. 1, Op. 46" (Edvard Grieg), "Piano Concerto No. 1, Op. 23" (Pyotr Ilyich Tchaikovsky), "Unfinished Symphony No. 8" (Franz Schubert)	3:46
3.	"Concerto aulico"	"The Carnival of the Animals: Le cygne" (Camille Saint-Saëns), "Má vlast: Vltava" (Bedřich Smetana), New World Symphony No. 9, Op. 95" (Antonín Dvořák)	6:02
4.	"Concerto romantico"	"Carnaval, Op. 9: Préambule, Chopin" (Robert Schumann), "Liebestraum No. 3" (Franz Liszt), "Nocturne, Op. 9, No. 2" (Frédéric Chopin)	6:02
5.	"Concerto etnico"	"Italian Symphony No. 4, Op. posth. 90" (Felix Mendelssohn), "New World Symphony No. 9, Op. 95" (Antonín Dvořák), "Symphony No. 1, Op. 68" (Johannes Brahms), "Polovtsian Dances" (Alexander Borodin)	5:23
6.	"Concerto mistico"	"Oboe Concerto in D minor, S D935" (Alessandro Marcello), "Serse: Ombra mai fu" (George Frideric Handel)	4:43
7.	"Concerto barocco"	"Surprise Symphony No. 94, Hob. 1/94" (Joseph Haydn), "Cello Concerto in E-flat major, deest" (Luigi Boccherini), "Concerti grossi, Op. 6, Nos. 1 and 12" (George Frideric Handel), "London Symphony No. 104, Hob. 1/104" (Joseph Haydn)	4:10
8.	"Concerto surreale"	"New World Symphony No. 9, Op. 95" (Antonín Dvořák), "Piano Concerto in A minor, Op. 16" (Edvard Grieg), "Symphony No. 1, Op. 68" (Johannes Brahms), "Étude Op. 25, No. 1" (Frédéric Chopin)	5:20
9.	"Concerto epico"	"Violin Concerto in E minor, Op. 64" (Felix Mendelsshon), "Violin Concerto in E-flat major No. 1, Op. 6" (Niccolò Paganini), "Cello Concerto in B minor, Op. 104 (Antonín Dvořák), "Aida: Triumphal March" (Giuseppe Verdi), "Pictures at an Exhibition" (Modest Mussorgsky)	6:26

== Personnel ==
- Gian Piero Reverberi – conducting, production, additional sounds, mixing
- Koch Graphic Studio – artwork
- Victor Togliani – cover art
- Sergio Barlozzi – sound engineer, mixing
- Franco Fochesato – sound engineer, mixing
- Klaus Strazicky – sound engineer

Credits are adapted from the album's liner notes.

== Charts ==
Chart performance for la storia del classico
Chart (2000)	Peak position
Swiss Albums (Schweizer Hitparade)	63
