= Not Quite Jerusalem (soundtrack) =

Soundtrack album by Rondò Veneziano
- Released: 1985
- Studio: Varirecording, Milan
- Genre: Classical crossover; easy listening
- Length: 37:46
- Label: Fanfare
- Producer: Gian Piero Reverberi

Rondò Veneziano chronology
Odissea veneziana (1984)	Not Quite Jerusalem (1985)	Casanova (1985)

Not Quite Jerusalem is the sixth studio album by Italian chamber orchestra Rondò Veneziano, released in 1985 by Fanfare Records. It is the soundtrack from the film of the same name (directed by Lewis Gilbert), composed, orchestrated, conducted and produced by Gian Piero Reverberi. The single named "The Love Theme From Not Quite Jerusalem" was released in the UK on 4 April 1985 and picked at number 6 in the "Airplay Bubbling" chart on Music Week.

== Overview ==
The film was edited by director Lewis Gilbert without a soundtrack, using provisional music from the albums The Genius of Venice and Venice in Peril, the British versions of the original albums released in Italy as Rondò veneziano (1980) and La Serenissima (1981). The result was so well received that he asked Gian Piero Reverberi to modify some of these pieces so they would fit within the correct running time and to add new ones. The composer admitted that the music had been completely changed, losing their original meaning, and that from that moment on he would never compose a soundtrack again.

== Track listing ==
All tracks are written by Gian Piero Reverberi and Laura Giordano.

The material has been re-orchestrated and modified for the occasion and comes from the original compositions entitled: "Andante veneziano" (a.k.a. "Symphony"), "Danza mediterranea" (a.k.a. "Mediterranean Dance"), "La Serenissima", "Notturno in gondola" and "Sinfonia per un addio". The tracks 2, 5, 7, 13 and 15 are not part of the soundtrack but were included to extend the album's running time. Some additional tracks heard in the film have never been released, including a much longer version of the "Main Theme: Staccato" with electric bass and drums, a different version of the "Gila's Theme" with orchestral cellos section instead of a solo cello, two different versions of the "Attack Theme" without strings, an unnamed tense orchestral composition and a solo for sitar.

No.	Title	Length
1.	"Main Theme: Orchestral (La Serenissima, Symphony)"	01:34
2.	"La Serenissima"	02:16
3.	"Love Theme: Part One (Notturno in gondola)"	01:26
4.	"Angus' Theme: Reprise (Mediterranean Dance)"	01:00
5.	"Mediterranean Dance: Total"	04:59
6.	"Rothwell's Theme (Symphony)"	04:16
7.	"Arabesco"	03:33
8.	"Love Theme: Total (Notturno in gondola)"	04:32
9.	"Main Theme: Staccato (La Serenissima, Symphony)"	01:31
10.	"Love Theme: Part Two (Notturno in gondola)"	01:37
11.	"Gila's Theme: Reprise (Sinfonia per un addio)"	01:03
12.	"Attack Theme"	00:48
13.	"Gila's Theme: Total (Sinfonia per un addio)"	05:41
14.	"Love Theme: Part Three (Notturno in gondola)"	02:12
15.	"Laguna incantata"	03:58

== Personnel ==
- Gian Piero Reverberi – arrangement, conducting, mixing, production
- Harry Thumann – sound engineer, mixing
- Michele Muti – sound engineer, mixing
- Plinio Chiesa – sound engineer, mixing

Credits are adapted from the album's liner notes.

== Charts ==
Chart performance for The Love Theme From Not Quite Jerusalem
Chart (1985)	Peak position
English Airplay Bubbling (Music Week)	6
