= Venezia 2000 =

Compilation album by Rondò Veneziano
- Released: 1983
- Studio: Varirecording Studios Milano, Milan; Queen Studio, Milan
- Genre: Classical crossover; easy listening
- Length: 34:24
- Label: Baby
- Producer: Gian Piero Reverberi

Rondò Veneziano chronology
Scaramucce (1982)	Venezia 2000 (1983)	Odissea veneziana (1984)

Alternative cover
- France release as Venise de l'an 2000

Venezia 2000 is the fourth album and the first official compilation by the Italian chamber orchestra Rondò Veneziano, released in 1983 by Baby Records. The album is a non-stop mix of their popular tracks. The album reached the first place in the Swiss chart, and also became double platinum. In France, the album was released as Venise de l'an 2000.

== Track listing ==
Symphony Part 1

1. "Sinfonia per un addio" – 4:15
2. "La Serenissima" – 2:05
3. "Notte amalfitana" – 3:03
4. "Rondò veneziano" – 2:23
5. "Aria di festa" – 0:59
6. "Arlecchino" – 2:09
7. "Aria di festa" – 1:14
8. "Rondò veneziano" – 0:55

Symphony Part 2

1. "San Marco" – 2:59
2. "Canal Grande" – 2:35
3. "Arabesco" – 3:03
4. "Scaramucce" – 2:37
5. "Giochi d'acqua" – 1:58
6. "San Marco" – 1:16
7. "Colombina" – 2:50

== Personnel ==
- Gian Piero Reverberi – arrangement, mixing, producer, writer
- Laura Giordano – writer
- Massimo Noè – mixing
- Enzo Mombrini, Erminia Munari – cover art

Credits are adapted from the album's liner notes.

== Charts ==
=== Weekly charts ===
Weekly chart performance for Venezia 2000
Chart (1983–1984)	Peak position
Dutch Albums (Album Top 100)	41
European Albums (Eurotipsheet)	43
German Albums (Offizielle Top 100)	2
Italian Albums (Billboard)	3
Italian Albums (Musica e dischi)	3
Italian Albums (Radiocorriere TV)	4
Swiss Albums (Schweizer Hitparade)	1

Weekly chart performance for Venise de l'an 2000
Chart (1984)	Peak position
European Albums (Eurotipsheet)	24

=== Year-end charts ===
Year-end chart performance for Venezia 2000
Chart (1984)	Position
German Albums (Offizielle Top 100)	53
Swiss Albums (Schweizer Hitparade)	30

== Certifications ==
Certifications for Venezia 2000
Region	Certification	Certified units/sales
Austria (IFPI Austria)	Gold	25,000^{*}
Germany (BVMI)	Gold	250,000^{^}
Switzerland (IFPI Switzerland)	2× Platinum	100,000^{^}
^{*} Sales figures based on certification alone.^{^} Shipments figures based on certification alone.
