= Masquerade (Rondò Veneziano album) =

Studio album by Rondò Veneziano
- Released: 30 September 1989
- Studio: Country Lane, Munich
- Genre: Classical crossover; easy listening
- Length: 31:30
- Label: Baby
- Producer: Gian Piero Reverberi

Rondò Veneziano chronology
Concerto (1988)	Masquerade (1989)	Barocco (1990)

Alternative cover
- Germany, the Netherlands and Europe release as Visioni di Venezia

Masquerade is the eleventh studio album by Italian chamber orchestra Rondò Veneziano, released in September 1989 by Baby Records. In Germany, the album was released in two versions, with different titles (Visioni di Venezia, also in the Netherlands and Europe, and Armonie) and track order. There, the album reached tenth place on the chart and was certified gold in 1991.

== Critical reception ==
On Radiocorriere TV, Pierguido Cavallina reviewed the album as a "pleasant listen that has a baroque flavour [...]. Reverberi is a true musician after all. He has recently returned to writing 'classical' music [...] Masquerade, for its part, is a pleasure to listen to".

== Track list ==
All tracks are written by Gian Piero Reverberi and Ivano Pavesi, except where noted.

=== Masquerade (International) ===
No.	Title	Music	Length
1.	"Costellazioni"		3:13
2.	"Venti d'oriente"		3:02
3.	"Luci e colori di Venezia"	Gian Piero Reverberi, Ivano Pavesi, Franco Fochesato	3:19
4.	"Ultimo incontro"		3:09
5.	"Accademia"		4:00
6.	"Visioni di Venezia"		4:00
7.	"Oltremare"		2:51
8.	"Le muse"		2:51
9.	"Note veneziane"		2:35
10.	"Floralis"		2:17

=== Visioni di Venezia (Germany) ===
No.	Title	Music	Length
1.	"Visioni di Venezia"		3:58
2.	"Ultimo incontro"		3:09
3.	"Note veneziane"		2:34
4.	"Miniature" (from the album Concerto)		3:04
5.	"Segreto" (unreleased track)		2:45
6.	"Floralis"		2:17
7.	"Accademia" (shorter version)		3:04
8.	"Velieri lontani" (unreleased track)		2:37
9.	"Venti d'oriente"		3:01
10.	"Costellazioni"		3:13
11.	"Oltremare"		2:51
12.	"Luci e colori di Venezia"	Gian Piero Reverberi, Ivano Pavesi, Franco Fochesato	3:19

=== Armonie (Germany) ===
No.	Title	Music	Length
1.	"Costellazioni"		3:13
2.	"Venti d'oriente"		3:01
3.	"Luci e colori di Venezia"	Gian Piero Reverberi, Ivano Pavesi, Franco Fochesato	3:19
4.	"Ultimo incontro"		3:09
5.	"Accademia"		4:00
6.	"Visioni di Venezia"		3:58
7.	"Oltremare"		2:51
8.	"Le muse"		2:50
9.	"Note veneziane"		2:34
10.	"Floralis"		2:21
11.	"Miniature" (from the album Concerto)		3:04

== Personnel ==
- Gian Piero Reverberi – arrangement, conducting, production
- Jesús Eduardo Álvarez Herrera – classical guitar
- Angus McKie – cover art
- Harry Thumann – sound engineer
- Klaus Strazicky – sound engineer

Credits are adapted from the album's liner notes.

== Charts ==
Chart performance for Masquerade
Chart (1989–1991)	Peak position
European Albums (Music & Media)	45
French Albums (SNEP)	4
Swiss Albums (Schweizer Hitparade)	4

Chart performance for Visioni di Venezia
Chart (1990–1991)	Peak position
European Albums (Music & Media)	22
Dutch Albums (Album Top 100)	60
German Albums (Offizielle Top 100)	10

== Certifications ==
Certifications for Visioni di Venezia
Region	Certification	Certified units/sales
Germany (BVMI)	Gold	250,000^{^}
^{^} Shipments figures based on certification alone.
