= Serenissima =

[La] Serenissima ([The] Most Serene) may refer to:

== Certain countries ==
- La Serenissima (Italian), a name for the Republic of Venice
- Serenissima Res Publica Poloniae (Latin), the official Latin name of the Polish–Lithuanian Commonwealth

== Art, entertainment, and media ==
- La Serenissima (musical ensemble), a British early music/period instrument ensemble
- La Serenissima (album), a 1981 album by Rondò Veneziano, also released as Venice in Peril
- "La Serenissima", a single by Rondò Veneziano, later covered by DNA and by Mike Candys
- "La Serenissima", an instrumental track from Loreena McKennitt's release, The Book of Secrets (1997)
- "Serenissima", a 1996 board game about 14th century Mediterranean commerce by Eurogames (game publisher)

== Sport ==
- Scuderia Serenissima, an auto racing team
- La Serenissima, a nickname for the San Marino national football team

== Other uses ==
- La Serenísima, an Argentine dairy products maker
- Autostrada A4 (Italy), nicknamed Serenissima after its destination, Venice

== See also ==
- Most Serene Republic
