= Rondò veneziano (album) =

Studio album by Rondò Veneziano
- Released: 1980
- Studio: Varirecording, Milan
- Genre: Classical crossover; easy listening
- Length: 34:56
- Label: Baby
- Producer: Gian Piero Reverberi

Rondò Veneziano chronology
| Rondò veneziano (1980) | La Serenissima (1981) |

Alternative cover
- UK release as The Genius of Venice

Rondò veneziano is the debut self-titled studio album by Italian chamber orchestra Rondò Veneziano, released in 1980 by Baby Records. In Italy, the album was a success, reaching the top three of the chart. In the UK, the album was released in 1984 by Ferroway Records under the title The Genius of Venice. By the end of 1981, the album had sold over 50,000 copies in Germany.

== Overview ==
Some of the tracks from the album were used as the soundtrack to the Lewis Gilbert's 1985 film Not Quite Paradise.

== Track listing ==
All tracks are written by Gian Piero Reverberi and Laura Giordano. In the British version the tracks "Tramonto sulla laguna", "Giochi d'acqua", "Notte amalfitana", "Andante veneziano" and "Danza mediterranea" are renamed as "Laguna", "Waterfall", "Solitude", "Symphony" and "Mediterranean Dance".

=== Rondò veneziano (International) ===
| No. | Title | Length |
|---|---|---|
| 1. | "Rondò veneziano" | 3:30 |
| 2. | "Tramonto sulla laguna" | 3:41 |
| 3. | "San Marco" | 3:24 |
| 4. | "Allegro veneziano" | 3:12 |
| 5. | "Giochi d'acqua" | 3:45 |
| 6. | "Colombina" | 3:09 |
| 7. | "Notte amalfitana" | 4:53 |
| 8. | "Andante veneziano" | 4:19 |
| 9. | "Danza mediterranea" | 5:01 |

=== The Genius of Venice (UK) ===
| No. | Title | Length |
|---|---|---|
| 1. | "Rondò veneziano" | 3:30 |
| 2. | "Laguna" | 3:41 |
| 3. | "San Marco" | 3:24 |
| 4. | "Allegro veneziano" | 3:12 |
| 5. | "Waterfall" | 3:45 |
| 6. | "Colombina" | 3:09 |
| 7. | "Solitude" | 4:53 |
| 8. | "Symphony" | 4:19 |
| 9. | "Mediterranean Dance" | 5:01 |

== Personnel ==
- Gian Piero Reverberi – production, recording, mixing
- Harry Thumann – recording, mixing
- Plinio Chiesa – recording, mixing
- Victor Togliani – cover art

Credits are adapted from the album's liner notes.

== Charts ==
Chart performance for Rondò veneziano
| Chart (1981–1982) | Peak position |
|---|---|
| Dutch Albums (Album Top 100) | 23 |
| German Albums (Offizielle Top 100) | 32 |
| Italian Albums (Billboard) | 1 |
| Italian Albums (Musica e dischi) | 3 |
| Italian Albums (Radiocorriere TV) | 1 |

Chart performance for The Genius of Venice
| Chart (1984) | Peak position |
|---|---|
| UK Albums (OCC) | 60 |
