= Zodiaco – Sternzeichen =

Studio album by Rondò Veneziano
- Released: 23 October 1998
- Studio: Arco Studio, Munich; Sator Studio, Munich; Park Studio, Tutzing; DG Studio, Genoa
- Genre: Classical crossover; easy listening; Italo dance
- Length: 49:29
- Label: Koch International
- Producer: Gian Piero Reverberi

Rondò Veneziano chronology
Marco Polo (1997)	Zodiaco – Sternzeichen (1998)	Attimi di magia – Magische Augenblicke (1999)

Zodiaco – Sternzeichen is the twenty-first studio album by Italian chamber orchestra Rondò Veneziano, released in 1998 by Koch International (Austria). In Europe it was released as Zodiaco – The Zodiac and in Spain as Zodiaco. In Italy it was re-released with a slightly modified cover in 2008 by Deltadischi as Zodiaco. The album peaked at number 35 in Switzerland. The album was advertised on Billboard on November 14, 1998.

== Overview ==
It is the second of three concept albums released by the orchestra following Marco Polo (1997) and preceding Honeymoon – Luna di miele (1999), inspired by the theme of the zodiac signs. The track "Toro – Terra" was re-recorded in 2000 with lyrics as "Aspittamu u ventu" by Sicilian singer-songwriter Vincenzo Spampinato for the album Kokalos.3 (label: Lengi Music).

== Track listing ==
All tracks are written by Gian Piero Reverberi and Ivano Pavesi, except where noted.

No.	Title	Music	Length
1.	"Zodiaco"	Gian Piero Reverberi, Giuseppe Valente	3:51
2.	"Acquario – Aria"		4:55
3.	"Toro – Terra"		4:54
4.	"Scorpione – Acqua"		2:56
5.	"Ariete – Fuoco"		3:48
6.	"Bilancia – Aria"		6:00
7.	"Leone – Fuoco"		3:48
8.	"Capricorno – Terra"	Gian Piero Reverberi, Giuseppe Valente	3:53
9.	"Pesci – Acqua"		3:22
10.	"Sagittario – Fuoco"		2:43
11.	"Cancro – Acqua"	Gian Piero Reverberi, Giuseppe Valente	3:34
12.	"Vergine – Terra"		3:46
13.	"Gemelli – Aria"		3:24

== Personnel ==
- Gian Piero Reverberi – arrangement (2–7, 9–10, 12–13), conducting (2–7, 9–10, 12–13), mixing, production
- Giuseppe Valente a.k.a. Giuseppe Zuppone – arrangement (1, 8, 11), conducting (1)
- Sergio Barlozzi – drumset, sound engineer (oboe and flute)
- Karlheinz Köpfle – artwork
- Victor Togliani – cover art
- Franco Fochesato – sound engineer (background sound)
- Klaus Strazicky – sound engineer (strings, guitars, choir, timpani and piano)

Credits are adapted from the album's liner notes.

== Charts ==
Chart performance for Zodiaco – Sternzeichen
Chart (1998–1999)	Peak position
Swiss Albums (Schweizer Hitparade)	35
