= G. P. Reverberi – Rondò Veneziano =

Studio album by Rondò Veneziano
- Released: 7 November 1992
- Studio: Arco Studios, Munich; Pilot Studios, Munich
- Genre: Classical crossover
- Length: 48:52
- Label: DDD – La Drogueria di Drugolo
- Producer: Gian Piero Reverberi

Rondò Veneziano chronology
Prestige (1991)	G. P. Reverberi – Rondò Veneziano (1992)	Il mago di Venezia (1994)

Alternative cover
- Germany and Europe release as Stagioni di Venezia

G. P. Reverberi – Rondò Veneziano is the sixteenth studio album by Italian chamber orchestra Rondò Veneziano, released in 1992 by DDD – La Drogueria di Drugolo. In Germany and Europe it was renamed as Stagioni di Venezia in 1993 by BMG Ariola. The album peaked at number 14 in France and 70 in Germany.

== Overview ==
Due to legal problems with Baby Records in 1992 Gian Piero Reverberi matured the idea of changing record label, choosing DDD – La Drogueria di Drugolo who personally dedicated himself to the new production of the group. The label had already been producing many artists since the 1980s such as Eros Ramazzotti, Mia Martini, Enzo Jannacci, Fiorella Mannoia and Matia Bazar. The new album featured Reverberi's name on the cover almost as if to recognise a certain priority, deserved after all, of the composer. The dates of the official tour were included in the booklet.

In an interview published in Music & Media on 7 November 1992, Gian Piero Reverberi described the new album as follows:"The first album had the same atmosphere and formula as baroque music [...] but since then I tried to make the music more modern by introducing guitar and synthesizers to give a more electronic atmosphere. On the one hand there is acoustic violin and chamber orchestra but on the other the tones are more atmospheric like movie soundtrack music or perhaps in the same vein as the music of Philip Glass."

== Track listing ==
All tracks are written by Gian Piero Reverberi and Ivano Pavesi, except where noted. "Rondò veneziano" and "La Serenissima" were recorded in new versions with slightly different arrangements and tempos.

No.	Title	Music	Length
1.	"Stagioni di Venezia"		3:11
2.	"Riverberi"		3:12
3.	"Il palio"		3:02
4.	"Antichi ricordi"		4:39
5.	"Via vai"		3:20
6.	"Corteo dei dogi"		4:32
7.	"Rondò veneziano"	Gian Piero Reverberi, Laura Giordano	3:20
8.	"Burano"		3:19
9.	"Voli e vele"		3:06
10.	"Ponte dei Sospiri"		4:14
11.	"Nonna Favola"		2:54
12.	"Murano"		3:21
13.	"Nuvole a colori"		4:32
14.	"La Serenissima"	Gian Piero Reverberi, Laura Giordano	2:12

== Personnel ==
- Gian Piero Reverberi – arrangement, conducting, mixing, production
- Ossi Shaller – electric guitar (10)
- Studio Anastasia – cover art
- Klaus Strazicky – mixing, sound engineer

Credits are adapted from the album's liner notes.

== Charts ==
Chart performance for G. P. Reverberi – Rondò Veneziano
Chart (1992–1993)	Peak position
European Albums (Music & Media)	66
French Albums (SNEP)	14

Chart performance for Stagioni di Venezia
Chart (1993)	Peak position
German Albums (Offizielle Top 100)	70
