= Venice in Peril (disambiguation) =

Venice in Peril may refer to:

- Venice in Peril Fund, a British charity that raises funds to restore and conserve works of art and architecture in Venice
- Venice in Peril Records, a sub-label of EMI Records formed in 1982
- La Serenissima (album), a 1981 album by Rondò Veneziano, also released as Venice in Peril
