= La Piazza =

Studio album by Rondò Veneziano
- Released: 21 October 2002
- Studios: DG Studio, Genoa; Veryton Studio, Munich
- Genres: Classical crossover; classical music; easy listening
- Length: 51:02
- Label: Baby
- Producer: Gian Piero Reverberi

Rondò Veneziano chronology
Papagena (2001)	La Piazza (2002)	25 – Live in Concert (2005)

Alternative cover
- France release as Concertissimo

La Piazza is the twenty-sixth studio album by Italian chamber orchestra Rondò Veneziano, released in 2002 by Baby Records International. In France the album was released as Concertissimo by RCA and BMG with a different track list. The album peaked at number 67 in Germany and 93 in France.

== Overview ==
As explained on the official website during the album's promotion (which initially had a slightly different cover with a 3D effect), the tracks are described as follows: "La Piazza", a track referring to Piazza San Marco, an ideal meeting point for all those who visit Venice and want to embark on this new adventure; "Andromeda", a tribute to Greek culture, which with its masterpieces laid the foundations of artistic aesthetics; "Festa celtica", refers to an exhibition on Celtic culture held at Palazzo Grassi, the track brings to life a day of celebration with the harmonious colors of this extraordinary people; "Luna in laguna", a summer full moon night with the reflections of moonlight shining on the calm waves of the lagoon; "Symphonic Run", the thrilling ride of a noble knight in a tournament; "Ronda di stelle", describes the thousands of bright dots in a blue sky that create the illusion of a dance in which the stars chase each other like fireflies; "Notturno romantico," the sound of a violin that carries through an open window the miracle of a romance from other times to a passerby, who stops for a moment and then continues on their way with a more serene soul; "Le vele", a Venetian regatta, a flock of white wings that float on small boats, brush against each other, and dance to the rhythm of the currents generated by the wind; "Abissi", describes the fascination of the deep sea, where everything seems the same and motionless, but where many different sparks of life are also hidden; "Ode russa", the solemn song of an ancient bard who tells of the era of many small journeys and many small heroes, all united by the desire for the culture of Mother Russia; "Piano su piano", an Italian play on words that means "To play piano on the Piano", which is both "to play" and "piano" since the two meanings are rightly identified by a single word; "Note di notte," an Adagio in the typical Rondò Veneziano style, which brings us back to a solitary square, in which, however, the scent of a thousand lovers can still be felt; "Gioco finale", intended as an encore for the 2000-2001 concert season; "Sinfonia corale", a tribute to the genius of Johann Sebastian Bach: a medley of four of the most beautiful moments of music of all time.

== Track listing ==
All tracks are written by Gian Piero Reverberi and Ivano Pavesi, except where noted. The tracks "Sinfonia corale" and "Suite di passione", with music by Johann Sebastian Bach, are arranged only by Ivano Pavesi. In the French version the tracks "La Piazza" and "Andromeda" are renamed as "Venise en fête" and "Concertissimo", the unreleased track "Rito indiano" (see SIAE) is renamed as "Rito andino".

=== La Piazza (International) ===
No.	Title	Music	Length
1.	"La Piazza"		3:34
2.	"Andromeda"		3:14
3.	"Festa celtica"		3:21
4.	"Luna in laguna"		4:25
5.	"Symphonic Run"		3:20
6.	"Ronda di stelle"		3:07
7.	"Notturno romantico"		3:50
8.	"Le vele"		3:52
9.	"Abissi"		3:13
10.	"Ode russa"		2:56
11.	"Piano su piano"		4:11
12.	"Note di notte"		3:16
13.	"Gioco finale"		1:48
14.	"Sinfonia corale"	Johann Sebastian Bach	6:55

=== Concertissimo (France) ===
No.	Title	Music	Length
1.	"Concertissimo"		3:14
2.	"Venise en fête"		3:33
3.	"Festa celtica"		3:21
4.	"Luna in laguna"		4:25
5.	"Symphonic Run"		3:20
6.	"Ronda di stelle"		3:06
7.	"Notturno romantico"		3:50
8.	"Le vele"		3:51
9.	"Rito andino" (unreleased track also known as "Rito indiano")		3:24
10.	"Abissi"		3:12
11.	"Ode russa"		2:55
12.	"Piano su piano"		4:10
13.	"Note di notte"		3:15
14.	"Gioco finale"		1:47
15.	"Sinfonia corale"	Johann Sebastian Bach	6:55
16.	"Suite di passione" (unreleased track)	Johann Sebastian Bach	4:49

== Personnel ==
- Gian Piero Reverberi – additional sounds, arrangement, conducting, mixing, production
- Ivano Pavesi – arrangement
- Sergio Barlozzi – additional sounds, drum set, mixing
- Fabrizio Giudice – classical guitar
- Ossi Schaller – electric guitar
- Munich Bach Choir – choir
- Ricky Andreoni – cover art
- Victor Togliani – cover art
- Franco Fochesato – mixing, sound engineer
- Klaus Strazicky – sound engineer

Credits are adapted from the album's liner notes.

== Charts ==
Chart performance for La Piazza
Chart (2002)	Peak position
German Albums (Offizielle Top 100)	67

Chart performance for Concertissimo
Chart (2002)	Peak position
French Albums (SNEP)	93
