= O du fröhliche =

German Christmas carol

- German Christmas carol
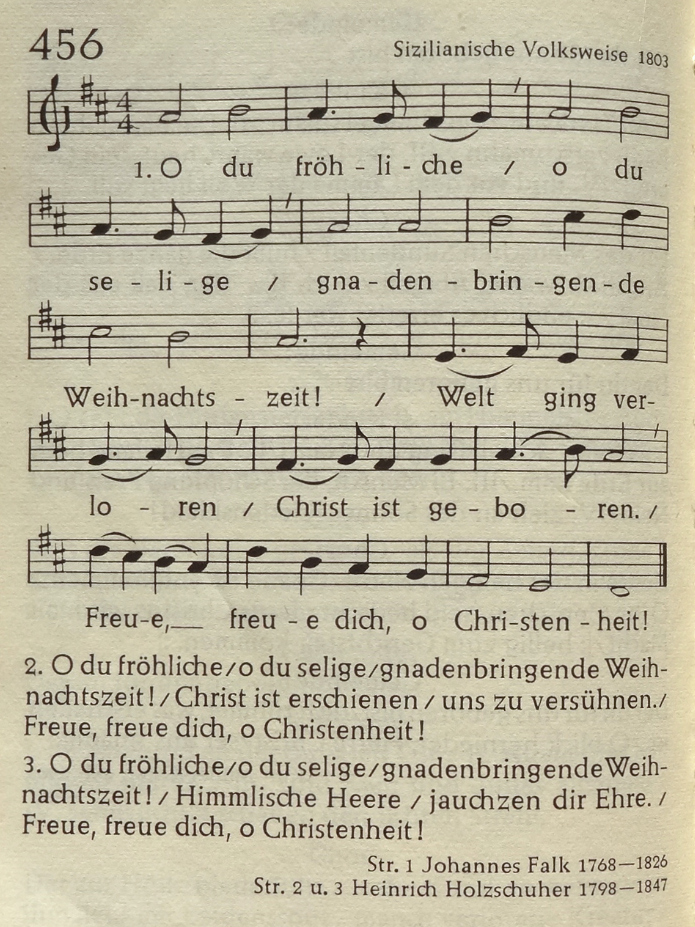
- Print in Evangelisches Kirchengesangbuch
- English: O, how joyful
- Written: 1815/26
- Text: by Johannes Daniel Falk, completed by Heinrich Holzschuher
- Language: German
- Melody: anonymous "O sanctissima"

"O du fröhliche" ("Oh, how joyful", literally: "Oh, you joyful ... [Christmastime]") is a German Christmas carol. The author of the original text was the prominent Weimar "orphan father" Johannes Daniel Falk (1768–1826), who set his lyric to the anonymous hymn-tune "O sanctissima" (O most holy). Shortly after Falk's death, his former assistant Heinrich Holzschuher (1798–1847) from Wunsiedel completed the set of three verses that are sung today.

== Original song ==
After Falk lost four of his seven children to typhoid fever, he founded the Rettungshaus für verwahrloste Kinder (Rescue house for abandoned children) in Weimar. In late 1815 or early 1816, he dedicated this song to the children of the orphanage. The melody was taken from the anonymous Catholic hymn "O sanctissima" (also known as "Sicilian Mariners Hymn"), which he found in the posthumous edition of J.G. Herder's Stimmen der Völker in Liedern after hearing it sung by Pietro Granucci, an Italian foundling under his care. In Falk's original text, the song was titled "Allerdreifeiertagslied" (A song for three holidays), highlighting the three major festivals of Christianity: Christmas, Easter and Pentecost.

== Original text ==
MIDI rendition

Organ with congregational singing

O du fröhliche, o du selige,
Gnadenbringende Weihnachtszeit!
Welt ging verloren, Christ ist geboren:
Freue, freue dich, o Christenheit!

O du fröhliche, o du selige,
Gnadenbringende Osterzeit!
Welt lag in Banden, Christ ist erstanden:
Freue, freue dich, o Christenheit!

O du fröhliche, o du selige,
Gnadenbringende Pfingstenzeit!
Christ unser Meister, heiligt die Geister:
Freue, freue dich, o Christenheit!

O (you) joyful, O (you) blessed,
Grace-bringing Christmas time!
The world was lost, Christ is born:
Rejoice, rejoice, O Christendom!

O (you) joyful, O (you) blessed,
Grace-bringing Easter time!
World lay in bondage, Christ is risen:
Rejoice, rejoice, O Christendom!

O (you) joyful, O (you) blessed,
Grace-bringing Pentecost time!
Christ our Master, sanctifies the spirits:
Rejoice, rejoice, O Christendom!

== Today's text ==
The song became famous as a Christmas carol that took its first verse verbatim from Johannes Daniel Falk. The second and third verses were partially rewritten in 1826 by Heinrich Holzschuher, a former assistant to Falk. The song's current form (with some regional differences in the text) is:

O du fröhliche, o du selige,
gnadenbringende Weihnachtszeit!
Welt ging verloren, Christ ist geboren:
Freue, freue dich, o Christenheit!

O du fröhliche, o du selige,
gnadenbringende Weihnachtszeit!
Christ ist erschienen, uns zu versühnen:
Freue, freue dich, o Christenheit!

O du fröhliche, o du selige,
gnadenbringende Weihnachtszeit!
Himmlische Heere jauchzen Dir Ehre:
Freue, freue dich, o Christenheit!

O (you) joyful, O (you) blessed,
Grace-bringing Christmas time!
The world was lost, Christ is born:
Rejoice, rejoice, O Christendom!

O (you) joyful, O (you) blessed,
Grace-bringing Christmas time!
Christ appeared to our atonement:
Rejoice, rejoice, O Christendom!

O (you) joyful, O (you) blessed,
Grace-bringing Christmas time!
Heavenly hosts rejoicing to honor you:
Rejoice, rejoice, O Christendom!

Oh, how joyfully; oh, how merrily
Christmas comes with its grace divine.
Grace again is beaming; Christ the world redeeming.
Hail, ye Christians, hail the joyous Christmas time!

Oh, how joyfully; oh, how merrily
Christmas comes with its grace divine.
Peace on earth is reigning, Christ our peace regaining,
Hail, ye Christians, hail the joyous Christmas time!

Oh, how joyfully; oh, how merrily
Christmas comes with its life divine.
Angels high in glory chant the Christmas story.
Hail, ye Christians, hail the joyous Christmas time!

The hymn has been translated into many languages, including English ("O, how joyfully"), French, Latin, Swedish ("O du saliga, o du heliga"), Norwegian ("Å du heilage, nådeberande"), Czech ("Ó ty radostný čase vánoční"), and Esperanto ("Feliĉega vi, ĉarmoplena vi").

== Religious use and importance ==
The song is used in the current German Protestant hymnal Evangelisches Gesangbuch (EG 44), in various regional editions of the German Catholic Gotteslob, in the Free Church Feiern & Loben (F&L 220) and in the Mennonite Mennonitisches Gesangbuch (MG 264). In the Protestant churches of Germany, the song is traditionally sung at the end of Christmas Eve services.

== Recordings ==
The carol is included in the album Sinfonia di Natale by Rondò Veneziano (1995).

== See also ==
- List of Christmas carols
