= Rapsodia veneziana =

Studio album by Rondò Veneziano
- Released: 1986
- Studio: Country Lane Studios, Munich
- Genre: Classical crossover; easy listening
- Length: 38:47
- Label: Baby
- Producer: Gian Piero Reverberi

Rondò Veneziano chronology
Casanova (1985)	Rapsodia veneziana (1986)	Arabesque (1987)

Alternative cover
- Germany release as Fantasia veneziana

Rapsodia veneziana is the eighth studio album by Italian chamber orchestra Rondò Veneziano, released in Italy by Baby Records in 1986. It reached number one in Switzerland and received platinum certification there. In Germany it was released as Fantasia veneziana, and in Belgium (with two different versions), Luxembourg, Sweden and the Netherlands as Lagune.

== Track listing ==
All tracks are written by Gian Piero Reverberi and Laura Giordano. In one of the two the Belgian versions the tracks "Fantasia veneziana (in La maggiore)" (the original title is "Fantasia in La maggiore", see SIAE) and "La Giudecca" are renamed as "Lagune" and "Bal masque".

=== Rapsodia veneziana (International) and Fantasia veneziana (Germany) ===
No.	Title	Length
1.	"Fantasia veneziana (in La maggiore)"	3:30
2.	"Perle d'oriente"	2:45
3.	"Arazzi (1ª parte)"	3:00
4.	"Torcello"	3:02
5.	"Arazzi (2ª parte)"	2:03
6.	"Festa mediterranea"	2:30
7.	"Isole"	2:44
8.	"La Giudecca"	2:49
9.	"Calli segrete"	3:29
10.	"Gondole"	4:37
11.	"Misteriosa Venezia"	3:25
12.	"Laguna stellata"	2:17
13.	"Notturno veneziano"	2:30

=== Lagune (Belgium) ===
No.	Title	Length
1.	"Lagune"	3:30
2.	"Perle d'oriente"	2:45
3.	"Arazzi (1ª parte)"	3:00
4.	"Torcello"	3:02
5.	"Arazzi (2ª parte)"	2:03
6.	"Festa mediterranea"	2:30
7.	"Pulcinella" (from the album Scaramucce)	4:06
8.	"Bal masque"	2:49
9.	"Calli segrete"	3:29
10.	"Gondole"	4:37
11.	"Misteriosa Venezia"	3:25
12.	"Notturno veneziano"	2:30
13.	"L'anello" (from the album L'odyssée de Venise)	3:20

== Personnel ==
- Gian Piero Reverberi – production
- Enzo Mombrini – cover art
- Harry Thumann – sound engineer
- Klaus Strazicky – sound engineer (assistant)

Credits are adapted from the album's liner notes.

== Charts ==
=== Weekly charts ===
Weekly chart performance for Rapsodia veneziana
Chart (1986–1987)	Peak position
European Albums (Music & Media)	26
Italian Albums (Musica e dischi)	12
Swiss Albums (Schweizer Hitparade)	1

Weekly chart performance for Fantasia veneziana
Chart (1987)	Peak position
Austrian Albums (Ö3 Austria)	15
German Albums (Offizielle Top 100)	4

=== Year-end charts ===
Year-end chart performance for Rapsodia veneziana
Chart (1987)	Position
Swiss Albums (Schweizer Hitparade)	26

== Certifications ==
Certifications for Rapsodia veneziana
Region	Certification	Certified units/sales
Austria (IFPI Austria)	Gold	25,000^{*}
Germany (BVMI)	Gold	250,000^{^}
Switzerland (IFPI Switzerland)	Platinum	50,000^{^}
^{*} Sales figures based on certification alone.^{^} Shipments figures based on certification alone.
