= Kommet, ihr Hirten =

Christmas carol

- German Christmas carol
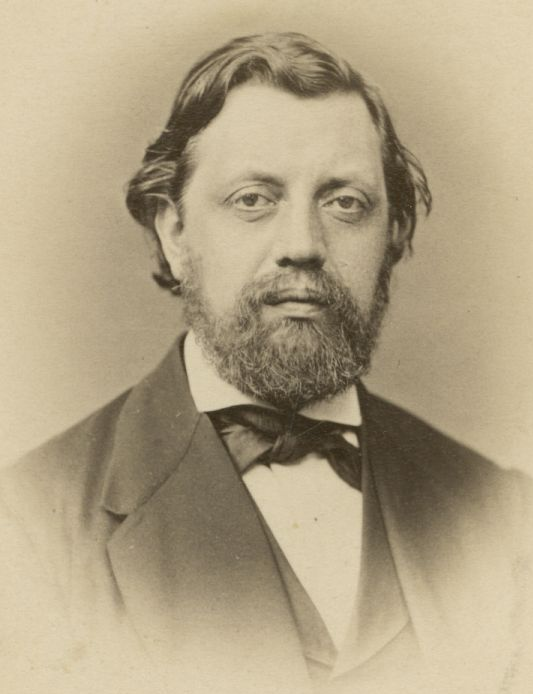
- Carl Riedel, who wrote the text
- English: "Come, All Ye Shepherds"
- Text: by Carl Riedel
- Language: German
- Based on: "Nesem vám noviny"
- Melody: Bohemian
- Published: 1870

"Kommet, ihr Hirten" (Come, ye shepherds) is a German Christmas carol from Bohemia which was derived from a Czech carol, "Nesem vám noviny". It reflects elements from the nativity story, the annunciation to the shepherds, their walk to the manger and their Adoration, inviting to follow their example. The first line, "Kommet, ihr Hirten, ihr Männer und Fraun", addresses shepherds, men, and women.

== History ==
The text of "Kommet, ihr Hirten" was derived from a Czech carol, "Nesem vám noviny". The German text was written as a free translation from the Czech original by Carl Riedel in Leipzig. It was first published under the title Die Engel und die Hirten (The Angels and the Shepherds) in 1870 in his collection Altböhmische Gesänge für gemischten Chor (Old-Bohemian chants for mixed choir). The song is in the tradition of shepherd songs, derived from the Annunciation to the shepherds and the Adoration of the Shepherds from the Gospel of Luke (Luke 2:8-20). Riedel's version is suited for a broad public.

The song is still popular. It is included in the Protestant hymnal Evangelisches Gesangbuch as EG 48, and in some regional sections of the Catholic hymnal Gotteslob of 1975 and its second edition, the Gotteslob of 2013.

In English, the song became known as "Come, All Ye Shepherds", translated by Mari Ruef Hofer in 1912.

== Text ==
The Czech song "Nesem vám noviny" (Bringing the news) has five stanzas. Riedel wrote a version in three stanzas of five lines each, rhyming in pairs with a concluding short last line. The beginning is "Kommet, ihr Hirten, ihr Männer und Fraun" (Come, you shepherds, men and women).

Kommet, ihr Hirten, ihr Männer und Fraun,
Kommet, das liebliche Kindlein zu schaun,
Christus, der Herr, ist heute geboren,
Den Gott zum Heiland euch hat erkoren.
Fürchtet euch nicht!

Lasset uns sehen in Bethlehems Stall,
Was uns verheißen der himmlische Schall;
Was wir dort finden, lasset uns künden,
Lasset uns preisen in frommen Weisen:
Halleluja!

Wahrlich, die Engel verkündigen heut
Bethlehems Hirtenvolk gar große Freud:
Nun soll es werden Friede auf Erden,
Den Menschen allen ein Wohlgefallen:
Ehre sei Gott!

Come, all ye shepherds, ye children of earth,
Come ye, bring greetings to yon heavenly birth.
For Christ the Lord to all men is given,
To be our Savior sent down from heaven:
Come, welcome Him!

Hasten then, hasten to Bethlehem's stall,
There to see heaven descend to us all.
With holy feeling, there humbly kneeling,
We will adore Him, bow down before Him,
Worship the King.

Angels and shepherds together we go
Seeking the Savior from all earthly woe;
While angels, winging, His praise are singing,
Heaven's echoes ringing, peace on earth bringing,
Good will to men.

== Melody ==
In 1847, the melody was first published in the collection Katolicky kancionál in Olomouc. Manuscripts are not dated but seem to stem from the first half of the 19th century. It is a bordun melody similar to folk music melodies.

== Recordings ==
The carol is included in the album Sinfonia di Natale by Rondò Veneziano (1995).

== See also ==
- List of Christmas carols
