= Johannes Daniel Falk =

German publisher and poet

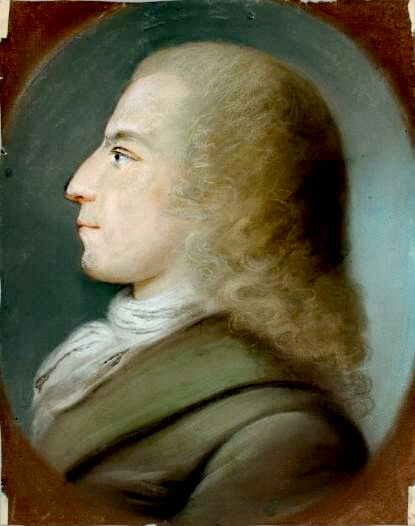
Photo of Johannes Daniel Falk

Johannes Daniel Falk (28 October 1768 Danzig – 14 February 1826 Weimar) was a German publisher and poet.

Falk was born in the port city of Danzig (modern-day Gdańsk), Royal Prussia, Polish–Lithuanian Commonwealth, where he received his first education against the wishes of his father, who wanted to employ the child in his business as wig maker. The Danzig city council granted Falk a theology stipendium at Halle, but he did not become a preacher and frequented literary circles of Schiller and Goethe instead.

In late 1815 or early 1816, he wrote the German text O du fröhliche that became a popular Christmas carol, to the melody of the Catholic hymn O Sanctissima.

Falk was the founder of the Falk'sche Institute, a public education place for orphans in Weimar. He died in that city in 1826.
