= Marco Polo (album) =

Studio album by Rondò Veneziano
- Released: 24 October 1997
- Studios: Arco Studios, Munich; DG Studio, Genoa; Studio Molinetti, Recco
- Genres: Classical crossover; easy listening; world music
- Length: 51:29
- Label: Koch International
- Producer: Gian Piero Reverberi

Rondò Veneziano chronology
Gian Piero Reverberi Conducts Rondò Veneziano – In concerto (1997)	Marco Polo (1997)	Zodiaco – Sternzeichen (1998)

Marco Polo is the nineteenth studio album by Italian chamber orchestra Rondò Veneziano, released in 1997 by Koch International (Austria). The album peaked at number 13 in Switzerland and 52 in Germany.

== Overview ==
It is a concept album about the travels of Marco Polo, using also traditional Tibetan and Mongolian music. To promote the album, an interview with Gian Piero Reverberi was released on CD, entitled Ein Interview Mit Gian Piero Reverberi (Koch International, 350 498) where he explains the project and the first use of world music played by Rondò Veneziano.

== Track listing ==
All tracks are written by Gian Piero Reverberi and Ivano Pavesi, except where noted.

No.	Title	Music	Length
1.	"Ouverture Marco Polo"		2:55
2.	"Marco Polo"		5:10
3.	"Il progetto: il viaggio"		3:42
4.	"I preparativi"		2:49
5.	"L'addio: gli affetti"		2:42
6.	"La partenza"		2:38
7.	"Verso est"		4:22
8.	"Il sogno: la Cina"	trad. "Üǰesgüleng goo - Um J̌andan Sirege"	1:37
9.	"La danza: la gioia"		3:13
10.	"Il canto: la meditazione"	trad. Tibetan monk chant	5:03
11.	"Festa al villaggio"	trad. "Üǰesgüleng goo - Um J̌andan Sirege", "Gandii modu"	2:37
12.	"Alba in pianura"	trad. "Qan-kökeyin uyangga"	3:02
13.	"La Grande Muraglia"		4:00
14.	"Il diario: la storia"		2:27
15.	"La meta: il trionfo"		4:57

== Personnel ==
- Gian Piero Reverberi – arrangement, conducting, piano, keyboard, mixing, production
- Giuseppe Valente a.k.a. Giuseppe Zuppone – arrangement, mixing (10)
- Sera Je – Tibetan monks (10)
- Mongolian music (sampled from the album Mongolian Instrumental Music, Series: World Music Library, 34, Seven Seas [KICC 5134], 1991; tracks: 1, 13 and 17) – Doljin Enhtaivan: limbe (11–12); Togtooliin Chagdarjav: morin khuur (11), Dashnym Enhtuya: yoochin (11–12), Tsegmid Gerelmaa: shudraga (11), Gurddrj Gantuya: yatga (11)
- Sergio Barlozzi – drumset
- Franco Fochesato – sound engineer, programming, mixing (10)
- Koch Graphic Studio – cover art
- Alberto Parodi – sound engineer
- Klaus Strazicky – sound engineer

Credits are adapted from the album's liner notes.

== Charts ==
Chart performance for Marco Polo
Chart (1997–1998)	Peak position
German Albums (Offizielle Top 100)	52
Swiss Albums (Schweizer Hitparade)	13
