= Odissea veneziana =

Studio album by Rondò Veneziano
- Released: 1984
- Studio: Country Lane Studios in Munich; Varirecording Studios, Milan; Baby Studios, Milan
- Genre: Classical crossover; easy listening
- Length: 40:42
- Label: Baby
- Producer: Gian Piero Reverberi

Rondò Veneziano chronology
Venezia 2000 (1983)	Odissea veneziana (1984)	Not Quite Jerusalem (1985)

Alternative cover
- France release as L'odyssée de Venise

Odissea veneziana is the fifth studio album by Italian chamber orchestra Rondò Veneziano, released in 1984 by Baby Records. In France, it was released as L'odyssée de Venise and in the UK as Odissea.

This album should not be confused with another Odissea veneziana, which is a reissue of Casanova (1985), but with the addition of two tracks from this album.

It has attained particular fame in the United Kingdom, where the instrumental section has been used as the theme tune for the BBC's television coverage of Horse Racing.

== Track list ==
All tracks are written by Gian Piero Reverberi and Laura Giordano, except were noted. In the British version the track "Odissea veneziana" is renamed as "Odissea".

=== Odissea veneziana (International) ===
No.	Title	Music	Length
1.	"Odissea veneziana"	Gian Piero Reverberi, Dario Farina	2:38
2.	"Tiziano"		11:28
3.	"Campo dei Mori"		2:49
4.	"Prime luci sulla laguna"		3:11
5.	"Ca' d'Oro"		6:06
6.	"Mosaico"		4:06
7.	"Rosso veneziano"		3:06
8.	"Fantasia veneziana"		4:41
9.	"Invito alla danza"		3:14

=== L'odyssée de Venise (France) ===
No.	Title	Music	Length
1.	"Odissea veneziana"	Gian Piero Reverberi, Dario Farina	2:38
2.	"Tiziano"		11:28
3.	"Campo dei Mori"		2:49
4.	"Prime luci sulla laguna"		3:11
5.	"L'anello" (unreleased track)		3:18
6.	"Ca' d'Oro"		6:06
7.	"Cecilia" (from the album Casanova)		3:15
8.	"Mosaico"		4:06
9.	"Rosso veneziano"		3:06
10.	"Invito alla danza"		3:14

== Personnel ==
- Gian Piero Reverberi – producer
- Harry Thumann – sound engineer (1, 4–9)
- Klaus Strazicky – sound engineer (assistant) (1, 4–9)
- Giancarlo Jammetti – sound engineer (2)
- Massimo Noè – sound engineer (3)
- Enzo Mombrini, Erminia Munari – cover art

Credits are adapted from the album's liner notes.

== Charts ==
=== Weekly charts ===
Initial weekly chart performance for Odissea veneziana
Chart (1985–1986)	Peak position
Austrian Albums (Ö3 Austria)	7
European Albums (Eurotipsheet)	41
German Albums (Offizielle Top 100)	3
Italian Albums (Billboard)	2
Italian Albums (Musica e dischi)	5
Italian Albums (Radiocorriere TV)	2
Swiss Albums (Schweizer Hitparade)	1

Initial weekly chart performance for L'odyssée de Venise
Chart (1986)	Peak position
European Albums (Eurotipsheet)	19
French Albums (SNEP)	17

=== Year-end charts ===
1985 year-end chart performance for Odissea veneziana
Chart (1985)	Position
Swiss Albums (Schweizer Hitparade)	19

1986 year-end chart performance for Odissea veneziana
Chart (1986)	Position
German Albums (Offizielle Top 100)	59
