= Arabesque (Rondò Veneziano album) =

Studio album by Rondò Veneziano
- Released: 1987
- Studio: Country Lane, Munich
- Genre: Classical crossover; easy listening
- Length: 35:59
- Label: Baby
- Producer: Gian Piero Reverberi

Rondò Veneziano chronology
Rapsodia veneziana (1986)	Arabesque (1987)	Concerto (1988)

Alternative cover
- Germany release as Misteriosa Venezia

Arabesque is the ninth studio album by Italian chamber orchestra Rondò Veneziano, released in 1987 through Baby Records.

In Germany the album was released under the title Misteriosa Venezia with a different track order and a different cover. In particular, the publication included two unpublished tracks "Cameo" and "Porta d'oriente", the track "Arabesque" was renamed "Misteriosa Venezia", the track "Fiaba antica" was divided into two parts, the tracks "La Scala d'Oro" and "Profumo d'oriente" were also excluded, and "Affresco" has a longer duration.

The album was a big success in Germany, topping the chart for three weeks in a row and eventually going platinum.

== Track listings ==
All tracks are written by Gian Piero Reverberi and Laura Giordano.

=== Arabesque (International) ===
No.	Title	Length
1.	"Arabesque"	3:06
2.	"Corso delle gondole"	2:27
3.	"Feste veneziane"	2:30
4.	"Profumo d'oriente"	3:18
5.	"Fiaba antica"	3:09
6.	"Armonie"	2:37
7.	"La Scala d'Oro"	3:24
8.	"Arcobaleno"	3:30
9.	"Ritorno a Venezia"	3:09
10.	"Affresco"	2:27
11.	"Specchio della laguna"	4:10
12.	"Rive e marine"	2:10

=== Misteriosa Venezia (Germany) ===
No.	Title	Length
1.	"Misteriosa Venezia"	3:05
2.	"Corso delle gondole"	2:29
3.	"Ritorno a Venezia"	3:09
4.	"Armonie"	2:36
5.	"Fiaba antica (1ª parte)" (modified version)	2:46
6.	"Cameo" (unreleased track)	3:43
7.	"Fiaba antica (2ª parte)" (modified version)	1:34
8.	"Feste veneziane"	2:38
9.	"Affresco" (longer version)	3:21
10.	"Specchio della laguna"	4:10
11.	"Porta d'oriente" (unreleased track)	3:15
12.	"Corso delle gondole"	2:25
13.	"Rive e marine"	2:11

== Personnel ==
- Gian Piero Reverberi – production
- Angus McKie – cover art
- Harry Thumann – sound engineer
- Klaus Strazicky – sound engineer (assistant)

Credits are adapted from the album's liner notes.

== Charts ==
=== Weekly charts ===
Weekly chart performance for Arabesque
Chart (1987–1988)	Peak position
European Albums (Music & Media)	6
Italian Albums (Billboard)	18
Italian Albums (Musica e dischi)	16
French Albums (SNEP)	7
Swiss Albums (Schweizer Hitparade)	2

Weekly chart performance for Misteriosa Venezia
Chart (1987–1988)	Peak position
Austrian Albums (Ö3 Austria)	14
German Albums (Offizielle Top 100)	1

=== Year-end charts ===
Year-end chart performance for Arabesque
Chart (1988)	Position
Swiss Albums (Schweizer Hitparade)	24

Year-end chart performance for Misteriosa Venezia
Chart (1988)	Position
German Albums (Offizielle Top 100)	35

== Certifications ==
Certifications for Misteriosa Venezia
Region	Certification	Certified units/sales
Austria (IFPI Austria)	Gold	25,000^{*}
Germany (BVMI)	Platinum	500,000^{^}
^{*} Sales figures based on certification alone.^{^} Shipments figures based on certification alone.
