= The Genius of Vivaldi, Mozart, Beethoven =

Box set by Rondò Veneziano
- Released: 4 December 1990
- Studio: Country Lane Studio, Munich
- Genre: Classical crossover; classical music; easy listening
- Length: 127:23
- Label: Baby
- Producer: Gian Piero Reverberi

Rondò Veneziano chronology
Barocco (1990)	The Genius of Vivaldi, Mozart, Beethoven (1990)	Prestige (1991)

Alternative cover
- Last Europe release as Rondò Veneziano spielt Wolfgang Amadeus Mozart, Ludwig van Beethoven, Antonio Vivaldi

The Genius of Vivaldi, Mozart, Beethoven is the thirteenth studio album by Italian chamber orchestra Rondò Veneziano, released in 1990 by Baby Records.

In France, it was released as Le génie de Vivaldi, Mozart, Beethoven and in Germany as Concerto per Vivaldi, Concerto per Mozart and Concerto per Beethoven by BMG Ariola. In Europe it was re-released in 2004 by BMG as Rondò Veneziano spielt Wolfgang Amadeus Mozart, Ludwig van Beethoven, Antonio Vivaldi. The album peaked at number 11 in Switzerland.

== Overview ==
This is the first cover album by Rondò Veneziano, drawn from the classical and baroque repertoire: the project is explained in the box set's liner notes: "The series The Genius of... has been produced bearing in mind the main difficulty any amateur who wishes to get familiar with the great composers of classical music will have to face when confronted with the monumental size of their works. To become familiar with the entire production they have created during their lifetime would require endless hours either in theatres or through a huge collection of recordings. [...] The sequence of the various themes and the order of succession has been arranged following their harmonic, rhythmic and dynamic characteristics. Nothing has been added arbitrarily: cutting and linking was made using solely the composer's original material. Only when the original compositions were sonatas for solo-instruments these had to be fully orchestrated in order to maintain homogeneous musical effects. The collection offers a sequence of "musical gems" in a new and unconventional presentation that anyone - amateur or connoisseur - can enjoy and the tracks are musical "units" complete in their anthological form, independent of their role within the composer's original framework".

== Track listing ==
All tracks are arranged by Ivano Pavesi and conducted by Gian Piero Reverberi.

=== The Genius of Vivaldi ===
1. "Autunno" – 6:51
2. "Inverno" – 3:15
3. "Estro armonico" – 4:43
4. "Il piacere" – 3:05
5. "La cetra" – 2:40
6. "Primavera" – 6:26
7. "Cimento dell'armonia" – 3:14
8. "Estate" – 5:34
9. "La stravaganza" – 4:24

=== The Genius of Mozart ===
1. "Così fan tutte" – 4:09
2. "Don Giovanni" – 7:25
3. "Sonata (K.545)" – 2:24
4. "Serenata (Part I)" – 5:27
5. "Serenata (Part II)" – 3:59
6. "Jupiter (Part I)" – 7:21
7. "Jupiter (Part II)" – 4:51
8. "Linz Symphonie" – 3:12
9. "Il flauto magico (Part I)" – 4:00
10. "Il flauto magico (Part II)" – 3:55

=== The Genius of Beethoven ===
1. "Coriolan (Ouverture)" – 5:53
2. "Romanza" – 5:03
3. "Chiaro di luna (Part I)" – 4:43
4. "Chiaro di luna (Part II)" –4:25
5. "Pastorale" – 5:07
6. "Sonata a Kreutzer" – 6:33
7. "Apoteosi della danza" –3:22
8. "Piano Concertos" – 5:06

== Personnel ==
- Ivano Pavesi – arrangement
- Gian Piero Reverberi – conducting, production
- Angus McKie – cover art
- Klaus Strazicky – sound engineer

Credits are adapted from the album's liner notes.

== Charts ==
Chart performance for The Genius of Vivaldi, Mozart, Beethoven
Chart (1991)	Peak position
Swiss Albums (Schweizer Hitparade)	11

Chart performance for Le génie de Mozart
Chart (1991)	Peak position
French Albums (SNEP)	26

Chart performance for Concerto per Mozart
Chart (1990–1991)	Peak position
European Albums (Eurotipsheet)	42
German Albums (Offizielle Top 100)	14
