= Prestige (Rondò Veneziano album) =

Studio album by Rondò Veneziano
- Released: 1991
- Studio: Country Lane, Munich
- Genre: Classical crossover; easy listening
- Label: Baby
- Producer: Gian Piero Reverberi

Rondò Veneziano chronology
The Genius of Vivaldi, Mozart, Beethoven (1991)	Prestige (1991)	G. P. Reverberi – Rondò Veneziano (1992)

Alternative cover
- Germany release as Magica melodia

Prestige is the fourteenth studio album by Italian chamber orchestra Rondò Veneziano, released in 1991 in Italy. In Germany the album was released as Magica melodia with a different track list and in Belgium as Interlude. A single of the same name was also released in Germany to support the album, but this song was not included in the original Italian release.

The album peaked at number 9 in Italy (only LP); however, it rose to number 4 in Switzerland, 24 in France and 27 in Germany.

== Track listing ==
All tracks are written by Gian Piero Reverberi and Ivano Pavesi.

=== Prestige (International) and Interlude (Belgium) ===
No.	Title	Length
1.	"Orion"	3:06
2.	"Gentil tenzone"	3:24
3.	"Venezia lunare"	3:25
4.	"Prestige"	3:25
5.	"Idillio"	2:50
6.	"Canto d'addio"	3:33
7.	"Rêver Venise"	3:14
8.	"Damsels"	3:00
9.	"Controcanto"	3:29
10.	"In fuga"	3:15
11.	"Estasi veneziana"	3:04
12.	"Larmes de pluie"	4:34

=== Magica melodia (Germany) ===
No.	Title	Length
1.	"Magica melodia" (unreleased track)	3:24
2.	"Rêver Venise"	3:14
3.	"Venezia lunare"	3:25
4.	"Gentil tenzone"	3:24
5.	"Larmes de pluie"	4:34
6.	"Estasi veneziana"	3:04
7.	"Barocco" (from the album Barocco)	3:05
8.	"Damsels"	3:00
9.	"Controcanto"	3:29
10.	"In fuga"	3:15
11.	"Orion"	3:06
12.	"Canto d'addio"	3:33
13.	"Incontro" (unreleased track)	2:25

== Personnel ==
- Gian Piero Reverberi – production, arrangement, mixing
- Enzo Mombrini – artwork
- Erminia Munari – artwork
- Victor Togliani – cover art
- Klaus Strazicky – sound engineering, mixing

Credits are adapted from the album's liner notes.

== Charts ==
Chart performance for Prestige
Chart (1991–1992)	Peak position
European Albums (Music & Media)	84
French Albums (SNEP)	24
Swiss Albums (Schweizer Hitparade)	4
Italian Albums: LP (Radiocorriere TV)	9

Chart performance for Magica melodia
Chart (1991–1992)	Peak position
European Albums (Music & Media)	88
German Albums (Offizielle Top 100)	27
