= Casanova (Rondò Veneziano album) =

Studio album by Rondò Veneziano
- Released: 1985
- Studio: Country Lane Studio, Munich
- Genre: Classical crossover; easy listening
- Label: Baby
- Producer: Gian Piero Reverberi

Rondò Veneziano chronology
Not Quite Jerusalem (1985)	Casanova (1985)	Rapsodia veneziana (1986)

Alternative cover
- Germany release as Odissea veneziana

Casanova is the seventh studio album by Italian orchestra Rondò Veneziano, released in 1985 through Baby Records. The album became a commercial success, peaking at number 2 in Italy and also becoming the chart leader in Switzerland. The album went gold in France, selling 100,000 copies. In Germany it was released as Odissea veneziana with a different tracklist.

== Track listing ==
All tracks are written by Gian Piero Reverberi and Laura Giordano, except were noted.

=== Casanova (International) ===
No.	Title	Length
1.	"Casanova"	3:08
2.	"Donna Lucrezia"	3:00
3.	"Nuovi orizzonti"	3:14
4.	"Nostalgia di Venezia"	2:29
5.	"Rosaura"	2:38
6.	"Giardino incantato"	5:14
7.	"Sogno veneziano"	3:17
8.	"Bettina"	3:10
9.	"Preludio all'amore"	2:58
10.	"L'orientale"	3:41
11.	"Interludio"	3:16
12.	"Cecilia"	3:43

=== Odissea veneziana (Germany) ===
No.	Title	Music	Length
1.	"Odissea veneziana" (from the album Odissea veneziana)	Gian Piero Reverberi, Dario Farina	2:35
2.	"Sogno veneziano"		3:16
3.	"Bettina"		3:09
4.	"Preludio all'amore"		2:57
5.	"L'orientale"		3:40
6.	"Interludio"		3:15
7.	"Cecilia"		3:43
8.	"Casanova"		3:06
9.	"Donna Lucrezia"		3:00
10.	"Nuovi orizzonti"		3:14
11.	"Nostalgia di Venezia"		2:28
12.	"Rosaura"		2:37
13.	"Giardino incantato"		5:14
14.	"Rosso veneziano" (from the album Odissea veneziana)		3:03

== Personnel ==
- Gian Piero Reverberi – producer, writer
- Laura Giordano – writer
- Harry Thumann – sound engineer
- Klaus Strazicky – sound engineer (assistant)
- Angus McKie – cover art

Credits are adapted from the album's liner notes.

== Charts ==
Chart performance for Casanova
Chart (1985–1986)	Peak position
European Albums (Eurotipsheet)	94
Italian Albums (Billboard)	2
Italian Albums (Musica e dischi)	6
Italian Albums (Radiocorriere TV)	2
French Albums (SNEP)	12
Swiss Albums (Schweizer Hitparade)	1

Latter weekly chart performance for Odissea veneziana
Chart (1992)	Peak position
European Albums (Music & Media)	71
Spanish Albums (AFYVE)	9

== Certifications ==
Certifications for Casanova
Region	Certification	Certified units/sales
France (SNEP)	Gold	100,000^{*}
^{*} Sales figures based on certification alone.^{^} Shipments figures based on certification alone.

Certifications for Odissea veneziana
Region	Certification	Certified units/sales
Austria (IFPI Austria)	Gold	25,000^{*}
Germany (BVMI)	Gold	250,000^{^}
^{*} Sales figures based on certification alone.^{^} Shipments figures based on certification alone.
