= O sanctissima =

Roman Catholic hymn

O sanctissima

"O sanctissima" (O most holy) is a Roman Catholic hymn in Latin, seeking the prayers of the Blessed Virgin Mary, and often sung in various languages on her feast days. The earliest known publication was from London in 1792, presenting it as a traditional song from Sicily; no original source or date has been confirmed for the simple melody or poetic text. The tune is often called "Sicilian Mariners Hymn" or similar titles, referring to the seafarers' nightly invocation of Mary as maternal protector: Our Lady, Star of the Sea. The tune has been notably reused for the German Christmas carol "O du fröhliche" (O, how joyful) and the English recessional hymn "Lord, Dismiss Us With Thy Blessing", and appears to have been adapted as the first half of the American Civil Rights anthem "We Shall Overcome".

Similar Latin lyrics have been set to entirely different tunes since the 1500s, by notable composers and arrangers including Leonhard Kleber (probably editing another composer), Louis-Nicolas Clérambault, E.T.A. Hoffmann, Antonín Dvořák, and Fritz Kreisler (using a melody of Arcangelo Corelli).

== Latin lyric and English translation ==
Below is a common version of the text; many other versions exist.

O sanctissima, o piissima,
dulcis Virgo Maria!
Mater amata, intemerata,
ora, ora pro nobis.

Tu solatium et refugium,
Virgo Mater Maria.
Quidquid optamus, per te speramus;
ora, ora pro nobis.

Ecce debiles, perquam flebiles;
salva nos, o Maria!
Tolle languores, sana dolores;
ora, ora pro nobis.

Virgo, respice, Mater, aspice;
audi nos, o Maria!
Tu medicinam portas divinam;
ora, ora pro nobis.

O most holy, o most loving,
sweet Virgin Mary!
Beloved Mother, undefiled,
pray, pray for us.

You are solace and refuge,
Virgin Mother Mary.
Whatever we wish, we hope it through you;
pray, pray for us.

Look, we are weak and deeply deplorable;
save us, o Mary!
Take away our lassitude, heal our pains;
pray, pray for us.

Virgin, look at us, Mother, care for us;
hear us, o Mary!
You bring divine medicine;
pray, pray for us.

The first lines of the Latin text are similar to the final line of the 12th-century prayer Salve Regina: "O clemens, O pia, O dulcis Virgo Maria." An 1820 book claims, without verification, that these words were already engraved at Speyer Cathedral at the time of Saint Bernard of Clairvaux (1090–1153). A 1612 book also associates the saint and the cathedral with these words, without claiming they were already engraved there during his lifetime.

== Widening circulation ==
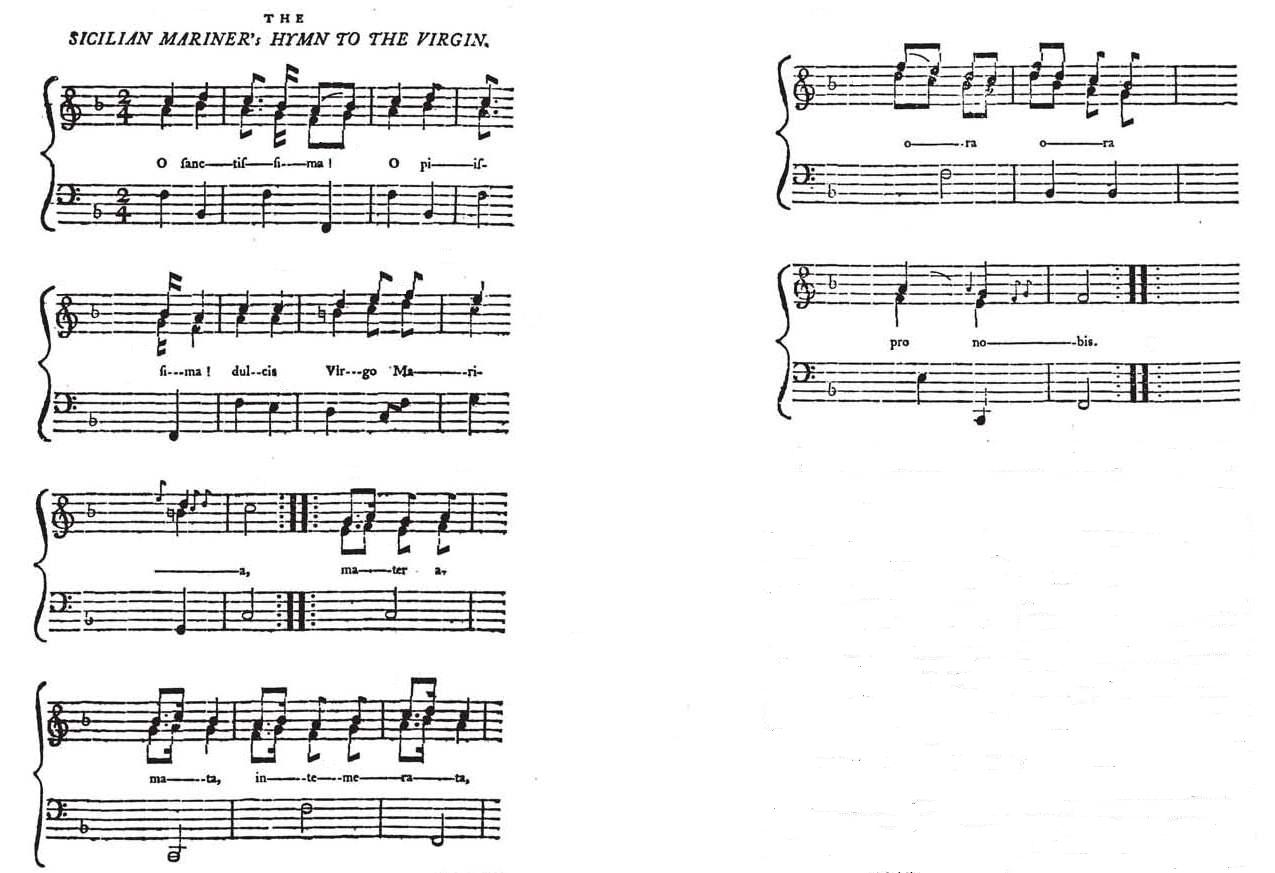
Earliest known printing: European Magazine, November 1792

"O sanctissima" was published as "The Prayer of the Sicilian Mariners", with text and music for voice and harp, in Edward Jones's Miscellaneous Collection of French and Italian Ariettas. His undated publication is sometimes estimated as 1785, but his cited position as Bard to His Royal Highness the Prince of Wales did not begin until "about 1790". The hymn was published anonymously by European Magazine in 1792 and then by an American magazine in 1794. By the early 1800s, "O sanctissima" was spreading widely in multiple languages. J.G. Herder included the song posthumously in his prominent book of traditional folksongs (Stimmen der Völker in Liedern, 1807), while Haydn (Hob. XXIIIc:F2) and Beethoven (WoO 157:4) each wrote choral arrangements of the Latin hymn. A German-language version ("O du fröhliche", c.1816) became a well-known Christmas carol, with original lyrics by J.D. Falk referring not to the Blessed Virgin Mary, but rather to Jesus himself and his day of birth. In English:

O, how joyfully; O, how merrily
Christmas comes with its grace divine.
Grace again is beaming; Christ the world redeeming.
Hail, ye Christians, hail the joyous Christmas time!

Or, in another English-language rendition:

O thou happy, O thou holy,
Glorious peace bringing Christmas time.
Angel throngs to meet thee; on Thy birth we greet Thee:
Hail to Christ, the Son of God, our newborn king!

In the 20th century, a group of textual variants commonly known as "O Thou Joyful" became popular in the United States. Although most of these texts are anonymous, one has been attributed to William Glass.

By 1835, the tune (with its first half repeated) also came to be used for the English recessional hymn "Lord, Dismiss Us With Thy Blessing", and by 1945 it appears to have influenced the melody of the American civil rights anthem "We Shall Overcome", with a close match between the chantlike first half of both tunes.
