= Honeymoon – Luna di miele =

Studio album by Rondò Veneziano
- Released: 20 August 1999
- Studio: Studio Mulinetti, Recco; Arco Studio, Munich
- Genre: Classical crossover; classical music; easy listening
- Label: Koch Records
- Producer: Gian Piero Reverberi

Rondò Veneziano chronology
Attimi di magia – Magische Augenblicke (1999)	Honeymoon – Luna di miele (1999)	La storia del classico (2000)

Honeymoon – Luna di miele is the twenty-third studio album by Italian chamber orchestra Rondò Veneziano, released in 1999 by Koch Records (Austria). In Italy it was re-released with a slightly modified cover in 2008 by Deltadischi. The album peaked at number 47 in Switzerland.

== Overview ==
As reported in the booklet, it's a concept album about a honeymoon in Venice with visits to some of the city's famous monuments interspersed between one bridge ("Ponte") and another. Inside there are some excerpts from classical compositions by César Franck in "La Fenice" (Prélude, Choral et Fugue, FWV 21), Georges Bizet (Overture from Carmen), Frédéric Chopin (Polonaise in A-flat major, Op. 53) and Giuseppe Verdi (La donna è mobile from Rigoletto) in "Conservatorio". It is the last album in which there are compositions by Giuseppe Valente also known as Zuppone.

== Track listing ==
All tracks are written by Gian Piero Reverberi and Ivano Pavesi, except where noted.

No.	Title	Music	Length
1.	"Luna di miele"	Gian Piero Reverberi, Giuseppe Valente	4:13
2.	"Venezia S. Lucia"		3:17
3.	"Ca' Rezzonico"		3:11
4.	"Ponte"		0:18
5.	"Palazzo Ducale"		2:18
6.	"Basilica dei Frari"		3:27
7.	"Ponte"		0:19
8.	"Palazzo Fortuny"		4:52
9.	"Serenata veneziana"		4:52
10.	"Ponte"		0:19
11.	"Conservatorio"	Gian Piero Reverberi, Ivano Pavesi, Georges Bizet, Frédéric Chopin, Giuseppe Verdi	4:08
12.	"Ponte"		0:48
13.	"La Fenice"	Gian Piero Reverberi, Ivano Pavesi, César Franck	3:55
14.	"Mercatino"		3:01
15.	"Serata al Lido"		3:34
16.	"Ponte"		0:22
17.	"Luna di miele" (acoustic version without drumset)	Gian Piero Reverberi, Giuseppe Valente	4:13

== Personnel ==
- Gian Piero Reverberi – arrangement, conducting, production, mixing, editing, mastering
- Fabrizio Giudice – classic guitar (10)
- Paolo Cattaneo – tenor (12)
- Deborah Biondi – piano (12)
- Koch Graphic Studio – artwork
- Victor Togliani – cover art
- Sergio Barlozzi – drumset
- Franco Fochesato – sound engineer, mixing, editing, mastering
- Alberto Parodi – sound engineer
- Klaus Strazicky – sound engineer

Credits are adapted from the album's liner notes.

== Charts ==
Chart performance for Honeymoon – Luna di miele
Chart (1999)	Peak position
Swiss Albums (Schweizer Hitparade)	47
