= Concerto (Rondò Veneziano album) =

Studio album by Rondò Veneziano
- Released: 1988
- Studio: Country Lane, Munich
- Genre: Classical crossover; easy listening
- Length: 35:59
- Label: Baby
- Producer: Gian Piero Reverberi

Rondò Veneziano chronology
Arabesque (1987)	Concerto (1988)	Masquerade (1989)

Alternative cover
- Germany release as Poesia di Venezia

Concerto is the tenth studio album by Italian chamber orchestra Rondò Veneziano, released in 1988 through Baby Records. In Germany the album was released as Poesia di Venezia and in Belgium as Splendore di Venezia by Silver Star in 1999. The album failed to chart in Italy, but topped the Swiss chart.

== Overview ==
"Controdanze" is a special composition with 3 dances (Minuetto, Polka and Gavotta) this technique is called Musical Holographie: when listening to the mono-left only you can hear the Minuetto (3/4), when listening to the mono-right only you can hear the Polka (2/4) and on stereo you can hear the Gavotta (4/4). The cover for the album "Poesia di Venezia".

The cover of Poesia di Venezia is inspired by the painting by Giovanni Paolo Panini entitled Musical Feast Given by the Cardinal de La Rochefoucauld for the Marriage of the Dauphin, Paris, Louvre.

== Track listing ==
All tracks are written by Gian Piero Reverberi and Ivano Pavesi. In the Belgian and German version the track "Concerto" is renamed as "Poesia di Venezia".

=== Concerto (International) ===
No.	Title	Length
1.	"Concerto"	3:55
2.	"Seduzione"	2:33
3.	"Sonetto"	2:33
4.	"Splendore di Venezia"	2:38
5.	"Miniature"	3:04
6.	"Controdanze"	3:00
7.	"Tema veneziano"	2:52
8.	"Nuvole"	2:27
9.	"Carrousel"	3:33
10.	"Tramonto d'autunno"	3:45
11.	"Chimere"	3:10
12.	"Perla del mare"	2:01

=== Poesia di Venezia (Germany) ===
No.	Title	Length
1.	"Poesia di Venezia"	3:55
2.	"Sonetto"	2:33
3.	"Tema veneziano"	2:52
4.	"Carrousel"	3:32
5.	"Controdanze"	3:00
6.	"Tramonto d'autunno"	3:45
7.	"Splendore di Venezia"	2:38
8.	"Nuvole"	2:27
9.	"Seduzione"	2:33
10.	"Perla del mare"	1:59
11.	"Chimere"	3:10
12.	"Rêverie" (unreleased track)	3:07
13.	"Gondole sulla laguna" (unreleased track)	3:14

=== Splendore di Venezia (Belgium) ===
No.	Title	Length
1.	"Splendore di Venezia"	2:38
2.	"Nuvole"	2:27
3.	"Seduzione"	2:33
4.	"Perla del mare"	1:59
5.	"Chimere"	3:10
6.	"Rêverie" (unreleased track)	3:07
7.	"Gondole sulla laguna" (unreleased track)	3:14
8.	"Poesia di Venezia"	3:55
9.	"Sonetto"	2:33
10.	"Tema veneziano"	2:52
11.	"Carrousel"	3:32
12.	"Controdanze"	3:00
13.	"Tramonto d'autunno"	3:45

== Personnel ==
- Jesús Eduardo Álvarez Herrera – classical guitar (1, 3, 5, 9, 11)
- Gian Piero Reverberi – production, conduction
- Angus McKie – cover art
- Harry Thumann – sound engineer
- Klaus Strazicky – sound engineer

Credits are adapted from the album's liner notes.

== Charts ==
Chart performance for Concerto
Chart (1988–1990)	Peak position
European Albums (Music & Media)	28
French Albums (SNEP)	3
Swiss Albums (Schweizer Hitparade)	1

Chart performance for Poesia di Venezia
Chart (1988–1999)	Peak position
Dutch Albums (Album Top 100)	96
German Albums (Offizielle Top 100)	8

== Certifications ==
Certifications for Poesia di Venezia
Region	Certification	Certified units/sales
Austria (IFPI Austria)	Gold	25,000^{*}
Germany (BVMI)	Gold	250,000^{^}
^{*} Sales figures based on certification alone.^{^} Shipments figures based on certification alone.
