= Willi Burger =

Italian harmonica player

Willi Burger (born 1934 in Milan), is an Italian harmonica player.

He won a world championship of chromatic harmonica in 1955 in a competition of Fédération Internationale de l'Harmonica, and he is considered one of the renowned classical harmonica players.

He has recorded albums with accompaniment of pianoforte (Marcello Parolini), classical guitar (J.E. Alvarez), string quintet (Capriccio Harmonico Ensemble). In other type of music, he has participated with Funky Beat. He also collaborated with the Italian songwriters Gino Paoli and Fabrizio De André. He has performed the harmonica in various important theatres in Italy and in harmica festivals of Europe, Taipei and Singapore. In 2006, he won the competition Crystal Harmonica conceived by the Belgian harmonica association. He is a member of the Diploma examination panel for Harmonica diploma examination (National University of Singapore). In 2008 he played at the gala concert of SPAH in St. Louis (USA) accompanied on piano by Marcello Parolini.

== Bibliography ==
- Approfondimento biografico su Doctorharp.it
- Biografia di Willi Burger
