= Sinfonia di Natale =

Studio album by Rondò Veneziano
- Released: 13 November 1995
- Studio: Arco Studios, Munich; Pilot Studios, Munich
- Genre: Classical crossover; classical music; easy listening
- Length: 50:35
- Label: DDD – La Drogueria di Drugolo
- Producer: Gian Piero Reverberi

Rondò Veneziano chronology
Il mago di Venezia (1994)	Sinfonia di Natale (1995)	Gian Piero Reverberi Conducts Rondò Veneziano – In concerto (1997)

Alternative cover
- Germany and Europe release as Weihnachten mit Rondò Veneziano – Sinfonia di Natale

Sinfonia di Natale is the eighteenth studio album by Italian chamber orchestra Rondò Veneziano, released in 1995 by DDD – La Drogueria di Drugolo in Italy and distributed in Europe by BMG Ariola.

In France, it was released as Symphonie de Noël and in Germany and Europe as Weihnachten mit Rondò Veneziano – Sinfonia di Natale (with the track 11 renamed as Laudamus Jesus).

== Track listing ==
All tracks are written by Gian Piero Reverberi, except were noted.

No.	Title	Music	Length
1.	"Sinfonia di Natale"		4:48
2.	"Ave Maria"	"Ave Maria" (Franz Schubert), "Ave Maria" (Charles Gounod)	4:54
3.	"Weihnacht Suite"	"Alle Jahre wieder" (Friedrich Silcher), "Gloria in excelsis Deo", "Tochter Zion" (George Frideric Handel), "Adeste fideles	4:49
4.	"Petit Papa Noël"	(Henri Martinet, Max Eschig)	2:05
5.	"Suite di Natale"	"In dulci jubilo", "Süßer die Glocken nie klingen", "Leise rieselt der Schnee" (Eduard Ebel), "Macht hoch die Tür"	3:48
6.	"Händel/Bach"	"Messiah": Sinfonia, For Unto Us a Child is Born (George Frideric Handel), "Weihnachts-Oratorium": Sinfonia (Johann Sebastian Bach), "Messiah": Hallelujah (George Frideric Handel)	6:30
7.	"White Christmas"	(Irving Berlin)	3:18
8.	"Christmas Suite I"	"Vom Himmel hoch, da komm ich her" (Valentin Schumann), "We Wish You a Merry Christmas", "Es ist ein Ros entsprungen" (Michael Praetorius)	3:54
9.	"Christmas Suite II"	"Kommet, ihr Hirten", "O du fröhliche", "The Little Drummer Boy" (Katherine Kennicott Davis), "Fröhliche Weihnacht überall"	5:59
10.	"Stille Nacht"	(Franz Xaver Gruber)	3:24
11.	"Rondò Veneziano Laudamus Jesus"		3.07
12.	"Caro Babbo Natale..."		2:42
13.	"Sinfonia di Natale (Reprise)"		1:10

== Personnel ==
- Gian Piero Reverberi – producer and sound engineer
- Glonner Chorbuben – choir
- Achim Natzeck – artwork
- Camillo Franchi Scarselli – cover art
- Klaus Strazicky – sound engineer

Credits are adapted from the album's liner notes.

== Charts ==
Chart performance for Sinfonia di Natale
Chart (1996)	Peak position
European Albums (Music & Media)	68

Chart performance for Weihnachten mit Rondò Veneziano – Sinfonia di Natale
Chart (1995–1996)	Peak position
German Albums (Offizielle Top 100)	15
