= Not Quite Paradise =

- Film poster
- Directed by: Lewis Gilbert
- Written by: Paul Kember
- Based on: stage play Not Quite Jerusalem by Paul Kember
- Produced by: Lewis Gilbert; William P. Cartlidge
- Starring: Joanna Pacuła; Sam Robards; Kevin McNally; Todd Graff; Selina Cadell; Ewan Stewart
- Cinematography: Tony Imi
- Edited by: Alan Strachan
- Music by: Gian Piero Reverberi; Rondò Veneziano
- Production company: Acorn Pictures
- Distributed by: J. Arthur Rank Film Distributors (UK); New World Pictures (US)
- Release dates: 28 March 1985 (UK); 6 June 1986 (US)
- Running time: 114 minutes
- Country: United Kingdom
- Language: English

Not Quite Paradise is a 1985 British comedy-drama directed by Lewis Gilbert. It was originally released in Europe under the title Not Quite Jerusalem, adapted by Paul Kember from his 1982 play of the same name.

It was filmed on two kibbutzim, Eilot and Grofit, as well as at the Mikveh Israel Agricultural School.

The soundtrack was composed by Rondò Veneziano and released in the UK under the film's original title.

== Plot ==
Six naive British and American volunteers arrive on kibbutz Kfar Ezra for a working holiday, exchanging their labour for the opportunity to experience first-hand its unique collective lifestyle. When Mike (Sam Robards), a young medical student, falls in love with Gila (Joanna Pacuła), the Israeli girl who is organising the volunteers' work and accommodation, he must choose between a life with her and returning home.

== Cast ==
- Joanna Pacuła as Gila
- Sam Robards as Mike
- Kevin McNally as Pete
- Todd Graff as Rothwell T. Schwartz
- Selina Cadell as Carrie
- Ewan Stewart as Angus
- Bernard Strother as Dave
- Kate Ingram as Grace
- Gary Cady as Steve
- Naomi Rosenberg as Finnish Twin
- Schuli Rosenberg as Finnish Twin
- Yaacov Ben Sira as Dobush
- Esti-Katz as Rivka
- Aharon Greener as Asher
- Zafrir Kochanovsky as Menachem
- Libby Morris as Mrs. Schwartz
- Bernard Spear as Mr. Schwartz
- Poly Reshef as Ami
- Irit Frank as Nurse
- Juliano Mer-Khamis as Hassan, Terrorist

== Production ==
The film was originally meant to star Julie Walters who had just appeared in the previous film from Lewis Gilbert, Educating Rita. The movie was financed off the back of the success of Educating Rita but was not as critically or commercially successful.

== Critical reception ==
Not Quite Paradise received very poor reviews. Nina Darnton of The New York Times panned the film as "an example of a good idea spoiled by a hackneyed, heavy-handed script, awkward directorial pacing, and posed acting... The script, while trying to humorously characterize national stereotypes, succeeds only in being insulting." Joe Baltake of the Philadelphia Daily News called it "annoyingly schizophrenic – thuddingly humorless when it isn't shockingly offensive." In a savage review in the Los Angeles Times, Patrick Goldstein argued that an "awkward" and "uneven" script, "a paucity of intriguing characters", and an overwrought soundtrack of quivering violins "delivers a dreary, cliché-ridden film with all the wallop of a sheaf of crumbling parchment paper."

London's Time Out contrasted the "strong material" in Paul Kember's original play to this melodramatic, "caramelized" screen version: "Gilbert has created a toffee-apple with the apple removed: bite through the sweet crust of romantic Holy Land locations, handsome Israelis, dashing Arab terrorists and corny jokes, and what remains is sheer emptiness." TV Guide was equally dismissive, noting, "the world of an Israeli kibbutz is reduced to a few simple-minded cinematic clichés... no different from a boarding school or overnight camp. The only really indigenous thing to be found here is the beautifully photographed Israeli scenery, which borders on travelog material rather than background setting."
