= La Serenissima (album) =

Studio album by Rondò Veneziano
- Released: 1981
- Studio: Varirecording, Milan
- Genre: Classical crossover; easy listening
- Length: 34:22
- Label: Baby
- Producer: Gian Piero Reverberi

Rondò Veneziano chronology
Rondò veneziano (1980)	La Serenissima (1981)	Scaramucce (1982)

Alternative cover
- Australia and UK release as Venice in Peril

La Serenissima is the second studio album by Italian chamber orchestra Rondò Veneziano, released in 1981 by Baby Records.

In Australia and the UK, the album was released in 1983 by Ferroway Records as Venice in Peril. The album managed to reach the top 40 of the chart in both countries, and was certified gold in the UK. The title track is used by the AHL's Henderson Silver Knights as their theme song.

== Overview ==
Some of the tracks from the album were used as the soundtrack to the Lewis Gilbert's 1985 film Not Quite Paradise.

== Track listing ==
All tracks are written by Gian Piero Reverberi and Laura Giordano.

No.	Title	Length
1.	"La Serenissima"	2:18
2.	"Rialto"	3:00
3.	"Canal Grande"	2:57
4.	"Sinfonia per un addio"	5:42
5.	"Arlecchino"	3:06
6.	"Regata dei dogi"	2:54
7.	"Notturno in gondola"	4:30
8.	"Capriccio veneziano"	3:46
9.	"Magico incontro"	3:02

== Personnel ==
- Gian Piero Reverberi – arrangement, conducting, sound engineering, production
- Harry Thumann – sound engineering
- Michele Muti – sound engineering
- Plinio Chiesa – sound engineering
- Guido Parmigiani – cover art

Credits are adapted from the album's liner notes.

== Charts ==
Chart performance for La Serenissima
Chart (1981–1982)	Peak position
Italian Albums (Billboard)	10
Italian Albums (Musica e dischi)	8
Italian Albums (Radiocorriere TV)	8

1983 chart performance for Venice in Peril
Chart (1983)	Peak position
UK Albums (OCC)	59

1984 chart performance for Venice in Peril
Chart (1984)	Peak position
UK Albums (OCC)	39

1988–1990 chart performance for Venice in Peril
Chart (1988–1990)	Peak position
Australian Albums (ARIA)	37
UK Albums (OCC)	34

== Certifications ==
Certifications for Venice in Peril
Region	Certification	Certified units/sales
United Kingdom (BPI)	Gold	100,000^{^}
^{^} Shipments figures based on certification alone.
