= Scaramucce =

Studio album by Rondò Veneziano
- Released: October 1982
- Studio: Varirecording, Milan
- Genre: Classical crossover; easy listening
- Length: 33:04
- Label: Baby
- Producer: Gian Piero Reverberi

Rondò Veneziano chronology
La Serenissima (1981)	Scaramucce (1982)	Venezia 2000 (1983)

Scaramucce is the third studio album by Italian chamber orchestra Rondò Veneziano, released in 1982 through Baby Records.

== Overview ==
Compared to the first two albums, Scaramucce has more classical elements than electronic ones. The Venetian Baroque has a great influence here again, but most of the pieces are very rhythmic. The album was a moderate success, reaching 33rd place in the German chart and 14th in Italy.

Some of the tracks from the album were used as the soundtrack to the Lewis Gilbert's 1985 film Not Quite Paradise.

== Track listing ==
All tracks are written by Gian Piero Reverberi and Laura Giordano.

=== Scaramucce (International) ===
No.	Title	Length
1.	"Scaramucce"	3:35
2.	"Alla corte del re"	2:54
3.	"Arabesco"	3:33
4.	"Laguna incantata"	3:55
5.	"Campielli"	3:08
6.	"Pulcinella"	4:06
7.	"Oboe d'amore"	2:37
8.	"Re Sole"	3:35
9.	"Riflessi sull'acqua"	3:28
10.	"Trasparenze"	2:41

=== Scaramucce (Germany) ===
No.	Title	Length
1.	"Scaramucce"	3:35
2.	"Alla corte del re"	2:54
3.	"Arabesco"	3:33
4.	"Laguna incantata"	3:55
5.	"Campielli"	3:08
6.	"La Serenissima" (from the album La Serenissima)	2:18
7.	"Pulcinella"	4:06
8.	"Oboe d'amore"	2:37
9.	"Re Sole"	3:35
10.	"Riflessi sull'acqua"	3:28

== Personnel ==
- Gian Piero Reverberi – production, mixing
- Cedric Beatty – mixing
- Plinio Chiesa – recording
- Enzo Mombrini, Erminia Munari – cover art

Credits are adapted from the album's liner notes.

== Charts ==
Chart performance for Scaramucce
Chart (1982–1983)	Peak position
German Albums (Offizielle Top 100)	33
Italian Albums (Billboard)	15
Italian Albums (Musica e dischi)	14
Italian Albums (Radiocorriere TV)	15
