= Barocco (album) =

Studio album by Rondò Veneziano
- Released: 1990
- Studio: Country Lane, Munich
- Genre: Classical crossover; easy listening
- Label: Baby
- Producer: Gian Piero Reverberi

Rondò Veneziano chronology
Masquerade (1989)	Barocco (1990)	The Genius of Vivaldi, Mozart, Beethoven (1990)

Alternative cover
- Germany and Europe release as Musica... fantasia

Barocco is the twelfth studio album by Italian chamber orchestra Rondò Veneziano, released in November 1989 through Baby Records. In France it was renamed as Mystère, in Germany and Europe as Musica... fantasia with a modified track list. It was released in Belgium as Capriccio veneziano in 2001 by Silver Star.

== Track listings ==
All tracks are written by Gian Piero Reverberi and Ivano Pavesi, except where noted. The German version has an unreleased track named "Venezia notturna".

=== Barocco (International) and Mystère (France) ===
1. "Barocco" – 3:05
2. "Musica... fantasia" – 2:50
3. "Le dame, i cavalieri" – 2:55
4. "Carme veneziano" – 3:13
5. "I sestieri" – 2:54
6. "Féerie" – 2:37
7. "Crepuscolo" – 2:56
8. "Divertissement" – 3:19
9. "Crepuscolo (Reprise)" – 2:05
10. "Tournament" – 2:57
11. "Cattedrali" – 4:25
12. "D'ombres et de lumières" – 2:50

=== Musica... fantasia (Germany) ===
1. "Musica... fantasia" – 2:50
2. "Crepuscolo" – 2:57
3. "Divertissement" – 3:19
4. "Crepuscolo (Reprise)" – 2:06
5. "Le dame, i cavalieri" – 2:55
6. "Cattedrali" – 4:25
7. "Tournament" – 2:59
8. "Féerie" – 2:38
9. "La Scala d'Oro" (Reverberi, Laura Giordano) – 3:23
10. "D'ombres et de lumières" – 2:51
11. "Carme veneziano" – 3:14
12. "I sestieri" – 2:54
13. "Le muse" – 2:50
14. "Venezia notturna" (unreleased track) – 3:51

== Personnel ==
- Gian Piero Reverberi – production, mixing, sound engineering
- Angus McKie – cover art
- Klaus Strazicky – sound engineering, mixing

Credits are adapted from the album's liner notes.

== Charts ==
Chart performance for Barocco
Chart (1990–1991)	Peak position
European Albums (Music & Media)	56
Italian Albums (Musica e dischi)	18
Swiss Albums (Schweizer Hitparade)	4

Chart performance for Musica... fantasia
Chart (1990–1991)	Peak position
European Albums (Music & Media)	68
German Albums (Offizielle Top 100)	21

Chart performance for Mystère
Chart (1992)	Peak position
European Albums (Music & Media)	48
French Albums (SNEP)	8

== Certifications ==
Certifications for Musica... fantasia
Region	Certification	Certified units/sales
Germany (BVMI)	Gold	250,000^{^}
^{^} Shipments figures based on certification alone.
