= Rondò Veneziano =

Italian chamber orchestra

- Logo

Background information
- Origin: Italy
- Genres: Classical crossover; Classical music; Easy listening; Italo dance; Orchestral pop; World music
- Years active: 1979–present
- Labels: Baby; Cleo Music AG; DDD – La Drogueria di Drugolo; Koch International
- Members: Stefano Marchioro
- Past members: Gian Piero Reverberi
- Website: rondoveneziano.com

Rondò Veneziano is an Italian chamber orchestra, specializing in Baroque music, playing original instruments, but incorporating a rock-style rhythm section of synthesizer, bass guitar and drums, originally led by Maestro Gian Piero Reverberi, who is also the principal composer of all of the original Rondò Veneziano pieces. The unusual addition of modern instruments, more suitable for jazz, combined with Reverberi's arrangements and original compositions, have resulted in lavish novel versions of classical works over the years. As a rule in their concert tours, the musicians, mostly women, add to the overall Baroque effect wearing Baroque-era attire and coiffures. The orchestra's album sales exceeded 30 million in 2017. Since 2025, the new pianist and conductor is Stefano Marchioro, who previously served as keyboard programmer for Gian Piero Reverberi from 1996 to 2010.

== History ==
The orchestra's first decade of albums included only entirely original compositions in the style of the baroque rondò, "a musical composition built on the alternation of a principal recurring theme and contrasting episodes".

In later years, in addition to many new and original albums continuing Gian Piero Reverberi's own unique Rondò style and tradition, Rondò Veneziano also brought their fusion of classical and contemporary instruments to a small number of albums dedicated to some of the great composers of the classical and baroque tradition.

In an interview, Maestro Reverberi said on the sound of Rondò Veneziano: "Rondò Veneziano's music is first of all positive. Also when it seems to be sad, it's never sad. It's always positive in a sense that at the end there's always a good future. So I think that also the reason of the success it that it's music where you don't have to think negative or to feel negative or if you feel negative it should be something that brings you to think positive."

In Italy, their debut album Rondò veneziano (1980) reached number 1 on the Germano Ruscitto chart and number 3 on the musica e dischi chart. It reached number 32 in Germany, where it sold more than 50,000 copies. The album La Serenissima (1981) reached number 10 on the Germano Ruscitto chart and number 8 on the musica e dischi chart. The album Scaramucce (1982) reached number 15 on the Germano Ruscitto chart, and number 14 on the musica e dischi chart, in Italy. It reached number 33 in Germany. The album Venezia 2000 (1983) reached number 3 on the Musica e dischi chart in Italy and number 2 in Germany.

A version of "La Serenissima" (the theme from the album Venice in Peril) was released in the United Kingdom as a single and reached number 58 on the UK Singles Chart in October 1983. The track was also widely used at that time by BBC Television, as the theme tune to Hospital Watch. The track was later to feature on the globally successful Venice in Peril album which was released as part of an international campaign to save Venice from sinking into the lagoon. A reissue of the album Venice in Peril reached number 34 in the UK.

In 1985, they provided the score for the movie Not Quite Jerusalem (known as Not Quite Paradise in the United States). This score was a reworking of many of the original pieces featured on the Venice in Peril and The Genius of Venice albums. The orchestra has produced 70 albums since its founding in 1979.

== Music videos ==
Rondò Veneziano's music videos are typically cartoon-like, usually featuring robots, spaceships, or views of Venice. Almost all directed by Guido Manuli, with animation by Walter Cavazzuti and Giovanni Ferrari, they were inspired by album covers created by Victor Togliani, Mombrini & Munari and Angus McKie.

=== La Serenissima (1981) ===
Directed by Guido Manuli, it's one of the most famous music videos, later imitated by Daft Punk: "from the waters flooding the lagoon city, amidst the roar of lightning, a group of violinists emerge, complete with music stands and scores, in an apocalyptic crescendo of a classical concert of wiged mannequins in eighteenth-century clothing, imperturbably playing the musical instruments. The dual nuances, both xerographed and airbrushed (a bit like the Japanese robot armor), with continuous cross-screen double-impression shimmers on the faces of the mannequins and statues, make it an extremely innovative piece of kitsch animation: ancient mannequins without faces yet also modern, even robotic: among the violins, violas, and electric guitars, they have hands (replacing Mickey Mouse's gloves), very similar to the robotic fists of Mazinger and Grendizer; while the spaceship, descriptive in its detailed and modern design, with a friendly astronaut on board, more graphic, recalls the more Italian atmospheres of the previous video for La Bionda, created with a more anamorphic style and modern colors. [...] And finally, the ending is interesting and distinctive, in which the spheres of light (filmed in double impression) fade into large iridescent bubbles that save the surviving protagonists, who, undaunted, continue the performance by boarding the spaceship, which is, however, very different from Japanese technology, making it more akin to science fiction and fantasy, blended with a more European design".

=== Odissea veneziana (1984) ===
Directed by Guido Manuli with sets designed by Victor Togliani (and reused for the cover of the 1985 German album Odissea veneziana), "the music video features a blond boy with a sword, flying on a huge, semi-mythological white bird towards a ruined castle in the Venetian lagoon, filled with reptiles and flying lizards, where he finds the entire Rondò Veneziano playing. There are various stylistic blends, from Japanese anime to playful Disney-style reworkings of the young protagonist, a fun Italian reworking of Wart from The Sword in the Stone".

=== Casanova (1985) ===
This is the most sophisticated and modern music video, in which Guido Manuli now seems to have fully mastered Japanese anime, in his own personal fusion of techniques and styles, even drawing inspiration from the atmosphere of The Rose of Versailles but completely revisited in an Italian style. It's a free and surreal interpretation of Giacomo Casanova, the famous Venetian seducer who, in his daring adventures, among many young ladies, does not forget to offer the kiss of Prince Charming to Snow White. Airbrushed sets, intense backgrounds inspired by the Gardens of Bomarzo, special effects, bright colors, and well-crafted serial animation seem to pave the way for the subsequent feature film about Giuseppe Garibaldi.

=== Il mago di Venezia (1994) ===
Directed by Kuno Dreysse, it's a music video that combines live action and animation. A child enters the Doge's Palace in Venice and steps into a violin that transports him to fantastical worlds. Upon opening a chest, he finds a pop-up book with Rondò Veneziano playing inside.

== Discography ==
- Rondò veneziano (1980)
- La Serenissima (1981)
- Scaramucce (1982)
- Venezia 2000 (1983)
- Odissea veneziana (1984)
- Casanova (1985)
- Not Quite Jerusalem (1985)
- Rapsodia veneziana (1986)
- Arabesque (1987)
- Concerto (1988)
- Masquerade (1989)
- Barocco (1990)
- The Genius of Vivaldi, Mozart, Beethoven (1990)
- Prestige (1991)
- Rondò 2000 – The Best of Rondò Veneziano (1992)
- G. P. Reverberi – Rondò Veneziano (1992)
- Il mago di Venezia (1994)
- Sinfonia di Natale (1995)
- Gian Piero Reverberi Conducts Rondò Veneziano – In concerto (1997)
- Marco Polo (1997)
- Zodiaco – Sternzeichen (1998)
- Attimi di magia – Magische Augenblicke (1999)
- Honeymoon – Luna di miele (1999)
- La storia del classico (2000)
- Papagena (2001)
- La Piazza (2002)
- 25 – Live in Concert (2005)
- Chamber Orchestra (2009)
- Once Upon a Time – A Musical DVD Odyssee (2010)
