= Harry Thumann =

German composer and producer (1952–2001)

- Born: Harald Thumann; 28 February 1952
- Origin: Germany
- Died: 2001
- Genres: Disco, space disco, funk, electronic
- Occupations: Record producer, sound engineer
- Instrument: Keyboards
- Labels: Philips Records, Baby Records

Harry Thumann (28 February 1952 – 2001) was a German electronic composer, record producer and sound engineer. He designed and built synthesizers and studio equipment.

== Early life and career ==
Born Harald Thumann in Germany, he began as a drummer while training in audio engineering at German broadcasters. When he lost interest in touring, he opened his first recording studio in a bedroom at the family home.

== Country Lane Studios ==
Thumann participated in the development of the SSL 4000 series of consoles and installed the first one in his studio. He found premises with live-in accommodation in Germering near Munich and opened Country Lane Studios.

Thumann adopted MIDI early, using Commodore 64 computers with MIDI cards to control a system that grew to include a Fairlight II and Moog 3C modular system.

With the Yamaha DMP-7 digital mixer, Thumann built a second control room housing several DMP-7s as an integrated digital console system, interfaced with a rebuilt Neve broadcast console. Country Lane moved into audio-visual production and began producing its own telefilms.

== Recordings ==
Thumann produced a string of albums for Rondò Veneziano that combined acoustic instruments and synthesizers.

He released his first solo album, American Express, in 1979. The single "Underwater" later appeared in the 2008 video game Grand Theft Auto IV. His second album, Andromeda (1983), included "Sphinx," which reportedly inspired the theme to Knight Rider. Both albums were released only on vinyl and are out of print, though American Express later received a remastered digital release on iTunes.

Thumann also released records under the name Wonder Dog, which he called "dog records." These had some success in Germany and the UK (through E&S Music). The single "Ruff Mix" reached No. 31 on the UK Singles Chart in September 1982.

== Discography ==
=== Albums ===
==== American Express (1979) ====
American Express (1979)

1. "American Express" – 7:26
2. "Give A Little Help" – 8:30
3. "Underwater" – 6:05
4. "You Turn Me On" – 4:45
5. "Christine" – 6:30

==== Andromeda (1983) ====
Andromeda (1983)

1. "Andromeda" – 7:48
2. "I'm Happy to Be in the Sun" – 5:30
3. "Out of Tune" – 2:31
4. "Welcome Back, Jolette" – 4:58
5. "Bitch" – 3:30
6. "Paris 1944" – 3:57
7. "Sphinx" – 5:19
8. "Living on a Farm" – 2:56

=== Singles ===
Year	Title	UK	US Dance	NL
1979	"Underwater"	#41	#17	#12
1982	"Ruff Mix" (as Wonder Dog)	#31	–	–
1982	"Andromeda"	–	–	–
1982	"Living on a Farm"	–	–	–

=== Remixes ===
- "Break Down the Line" (Extended Version) on Jam Tronik's "Stand by Me" (Dance Mix) (1992)
