= Radiocorriere TV =

Italian magazine

- Cover of Radiocorriere's issue of 26 June 1955, featuring Maria Callas
- Direttore: Fabrizio Casinelli
- Frequency: Weekly
- Format: tabloid
- Circulation: 700,000
- First issue: 1925
- Final issue: 1995
- Company: RAI
- Country: Italy
- Language: Italian
- Website: www.radiocorriere.teche.rai.it

Radiocorriere TV
- Categories: Listings magazine; Entertainment & media
- Format: Online
- Publisher: Rcc edizioni
- First issue: 1999
- Country: Italy
- Language: Italian
- Website: http://www.radiocorrieretv.rai.it

Radiocorriere TV (since 1954) (English: Radio Courier TV), formerly Radiocorriere (1930–1954) and Radio Orario (1925–1930), is an Italian-language listings magazine, with weekly print editions published in Italy between 1925 and 1995 under the press of RAI (formerly URI). It rebooted under publisher RCC Edizioni and owner Rai Trade with print editions from 1999–2008, then closed due to poor sales and reopened as an online magazine in 2012. Since 1995 it has also had occasional special-edition print runs under various publishers.

On 3 January 2014 Rai Teche published online the complete 1925–1995 archives of URI/RAI's Radio Orario/Radiocorriere/TV.

== History and profile ==
The magazine was founded in January 1925 in Rome with the name Radiorario as the official magazine of URI ("Unione Radiofonica Italiana", i.e. "Italian Radio Union", Italy's first licensed broadcasting company which had formed in Turin a few months before), with the aim of publishing the schedules of Italian radio and major foreign radio stations. In 1926 the editorial staff was moved to Milan and the magazine was renamed Radio Orario. In 1928 EIAR replaced URI and in 1930 the magazine assumed its definitive name, Radiocorriere. In a few years, in conjunction with the spreading of the radio, the circulation of the magazine reached 8 million copies per year.

On 15 May 1943 the publications were suspended, and they reprised after EIAR became RAI, in November 1945. In the 1950s the magazine started to cover culture topics, news, music and television, and in 1952 its circulation had risen to about one million copies per week. Because of the competition of other magazines such as TV Sorrisi e Canzoni, in the 1970s the circulation started to decline, and after trying to relaunch its circulation through several structure and layout changes, the magazine eventually closed in December 1995. In its last year, it had a circulation of 111,681 copies per week. In 2010, RAI resurrected Radiocorriere and turned it into a weekly online magazine curated by its press office.

== See also ==
- List of magazines in Italy
