= Koch Entertainment =

American media company

- Type: Private
- Industry: Music distribution Film distribution Broadcast syndication Record label
- Founded: 1987; 39 years ago
- Founder: Franz Koch
- Defunct: 2009; 17 years ago
- Fate: Folded into E1 Entertainment
- Successor: Lionsgate Canada
- Headquarters: Port Washington, New York, U.S.
- Parent: Koch International
- Divisions: Koch Entertainment Distribution; Koch-Lorber Films; Koch Vision; Koch Records; Koch Entertainment Canada; DRG Records

Koch Entertainment was an American record label and a distributor of film, television, and music. It was purchased by Canadian entertainment company ROW Entertainment in 2005.

== History ==
=== First years ===
The company began in 1975 as part of Koch International originally of Tirol, later of Munich. Founded by Tirolean banker Franz Koch, Koch was an independent Austrian record label, recording studio, and music distribution company that specialized in German Folk Music and later popular classical music recordings. For over 20 years, the international arm of the company operated under the name Koch Entertainment, a music, film, and television distribution & record label company that was started in 1987 by Franz's son Michael in New York City. In 1988, the parent Austrian company Koch acquired Schwann Records from Schwann Verlag.

=== 1990s ===
By 1991, Koch had become one of the first national independent distributors of domestic labels in the U.S. by offering an alternative to the traditional system of regional independent distribution or national major label distribution. In 1992, Koch was ranked #315 on Inc. Magazine's list of America's 500 fastest-growing private companies, and has since grown into an entertainment conglomerate. It acquired the specialist German label Schwann, Koch expanded into the Canadian market in 1995 by forming the Toronto-based Koch Entertainment Canada. In 1996, Koch International took over Discover, a budget label which had been set up by conductor Ali Rahbari to challenge the dominance in the budget classical sector of Naxos. The new Koch Discover International was to be jointly controlled by Franz Koch and Rahbari. The Austrian parent Koch divested Schwann to Deutsche Grammophone's parent Universal Music GmbH in 2002.

=== 2000s ===
In 2003, Koch formed the DVD label Koch Lorber in collaboration with Richard Lorber. In 2005, Koch was acquired by the Canadian company ROW Entertainment (later Entertainment One, now Lionsgate Canada).
