= Baby Records (Italy) =

Italian record label

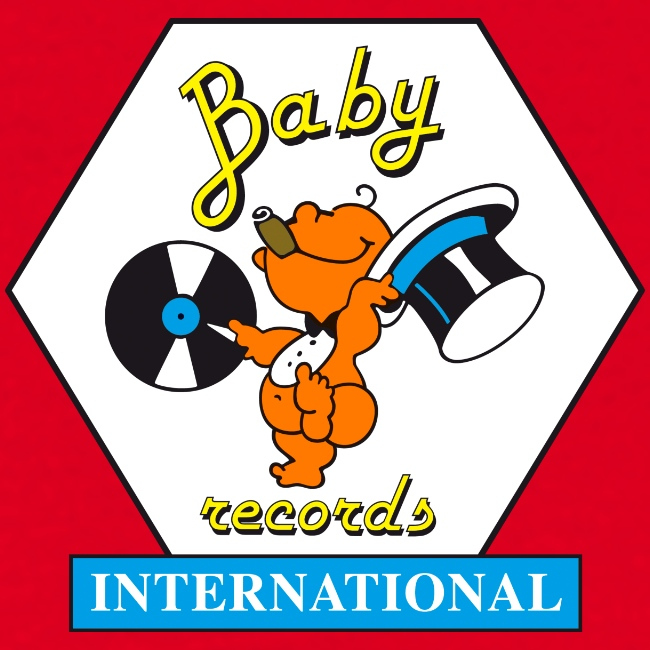
- Founded: 1974
- Founder: Freddy Naggiar
- Defunct: 1994
- Distributors: Self-distributed (only 1974), CGD (1975-1988), PolyGram (1988-1994), BMG Ariola (1988-1990, West Germany only)
- Genre: pop, disco, italo disco, instrumental, orchestral
- Country of origin: Italy
- Location: Milan

Baby Records was an Italian record label which was founded in 1974 by Freddy Naggiar.

== History ==
Initially located in Piazza della Repubblica in Milan, the company later moved to new premises in Via Timavo. Naggiar signed a distribution contract with Yep and in 1975 the label got its first hit in the Italian charts with Santo California's "Tornerò".

== Success ==
Over the years Baby Records signed many popular Italo disco and Electropop acts including Den Harrow, Gazebo, Albert One, La Bionda, Pino Presti, K.I.D., Stefano Pulga, Spargo, DD Sound, Kimera, Santo California, Al Bano & Romina Power, Ricchi e Poveri, Dario Farina, and others. It also released albums by Italian 1960s pop star Rosanna Fratello, albums of children's songs sang by Romina Power and I Cavalieri del Re, and instrumental music albums by American pianist and composer Stephen Schlaks and Venetian ensemble Rondò Veneziano.

In 1983, Baby Records released Mixage, the first of a series of dance music compilation albums. This was followed by Bimbomix, a compilation album targeted to a younger audience. In 1986, an unofficial Baby Records anthem called Highway To Freedom was released by a group called Fahreinheit 104, which consisted of Baby Records singers, producers, and composers, including Tom Hooker, Maurizio Vandelli, Dario Farina, and Jane Hill. The music video, shot in a Kent chalk quarry, also featured Eddy Huntington alongside the cast of thousands of others. In 1987, it released Italian prog-rock band Le Orme's "Dimmi che cos'è".

== Later years ==
By the end of the 1980s, the company ventured into international and television productions. Successful releases in the 1990s included Down Low's "Once Upon a Time" and super group Rappers Against The Racism's "Only You" reached a new peak in the charts. In 1994 Baby Records changed its name to Baby Records International and expanded its operations to other areas, such as Germany, England and North America.
