= Gian Piero Reverberi =

Italian composer (born 1939)

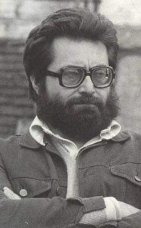
- Born: 29 July 1939 (age 87); Genoa, Kingdom of Italy
- Occupations: Pianist, composer, arranger, conductor, entrepreneur
- Years active: 1959 - 2025
- Known for: Rondò Veneziano
- Relatives: Gian Franco Reverberi (brother)

Signature
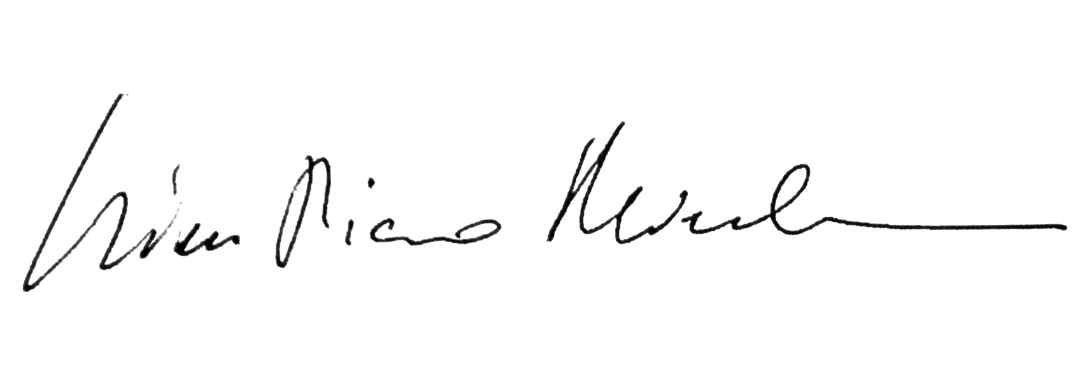

Gian Piero Reverberi (Italian pronunciation: [dʒam ˈpjɛːro reˈvɛrberi]; born 29 July 1939) is an Italian pianist, composer, arranger, conductor, and entrepreneur.

== Biography ==
After obtaining Diplomas in piano and composition from the Paganini Conservatory in Genoa, Reverberi worked in a wide range of media, including TV themes, spaghetti Western soundtracks to pop and rock records, where, with Robert Mellin, he composed the memorable music to the children's TV series The Adventures of Robinson Crusoe in 1964. He created the Rondò Veneziano ensemble. He also worked with his brother Gian Franco on the song "Last Men Standing" (or "Nel cimitero di Tucson") from the soundtrack of Django, Prepare a Coffin (Preparati la bara!), which was sampled in Gnarls Barkley's hit "Crazy".

As a producer, Reverberi worked for New Trolls and Le Orme progressive rock bands, being also listed as one of the official members of the latter for a short stint. In the 1960s-1970s he was also the producer of several albums of singer-songwriters such as Lucio Battisti, Fabrizio De André, Luigi Tenco and Gino Paoli.

In 1979, he founded the Rondò Veneziano chamber orchestra, which he has led ever since, having been the main composer, arranger, and conductor of the group. They play original instrumentals, incorporating a modern rock-style rhythm section comprising synthesizer, bass guitar and drums.

== Discography ==
- 1966 – Lui non t'ama come me/Sono momenti/Ti penso e prego (Orchestra di Gian Piero Reverberi)
- 1969 – Plenilunio d'agosto/Dialogo d'Amore
- 1971 – Messaggio per te (musica di Gian Piero Reverberi)/Hot Underground Group
- 1975 – Reverberi
- 1976 – Timer
- 1977 – Stairway to Heaven
- 1990 – Colonna sonora per l'International Tennis Tournament di Monaco di Baviera con l'album GSC - Open Universe (BMG Ariola)
- 1993 – L'antivirtuoso
- 1997 – The Adventures of Robinson Crusoe (with Robert Mellin)

== See also ==
- Rondò Veneziano
