= Anastacia discography =

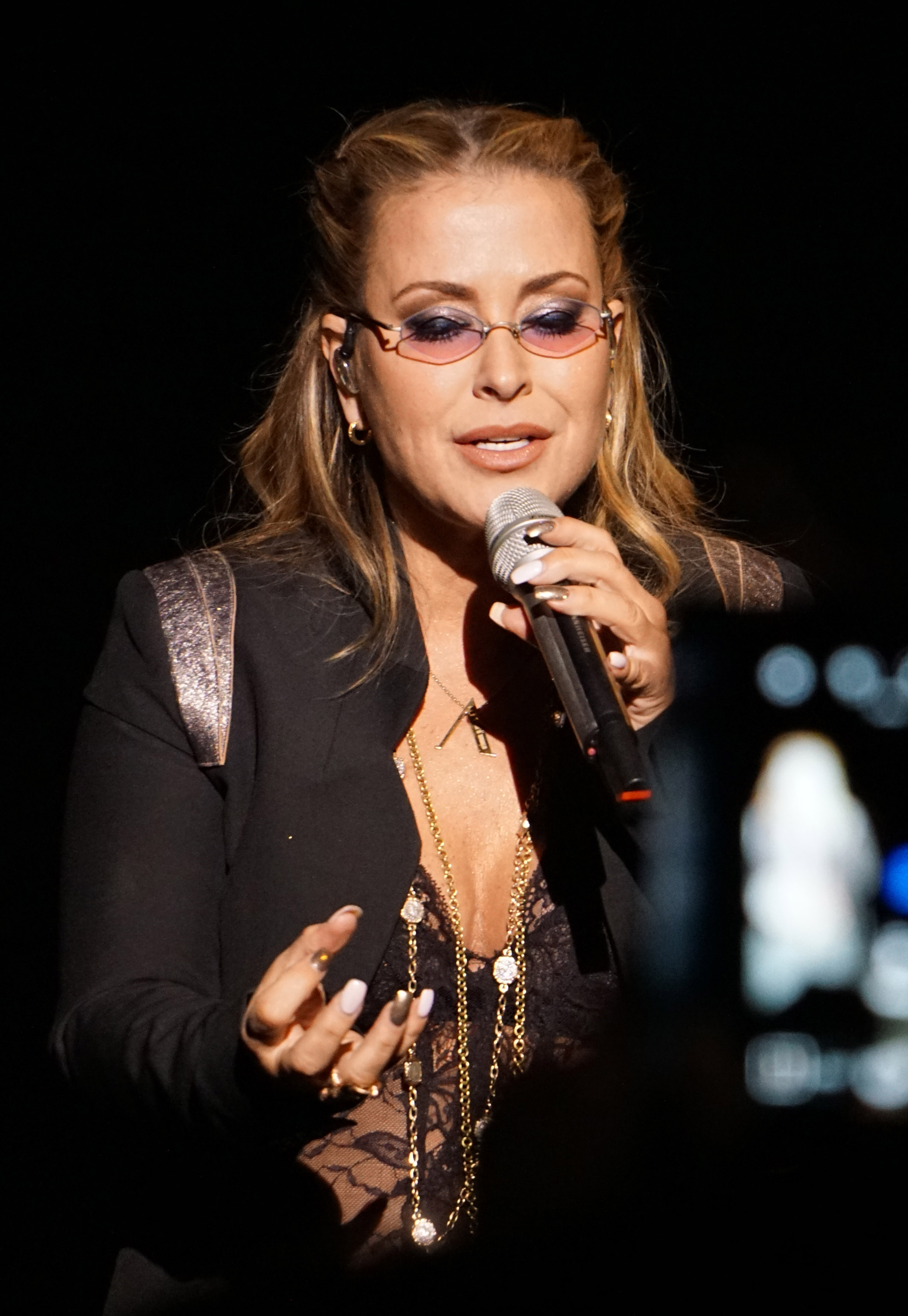
- Anastacia performing at the Shepherd's Bush Empire, 2015
- Studio albums: 8
- Live albums: 3
- Compilation albums: 2
- Singles: 34
- Music videos: 34

The discography of Anastacia, an American singer, consists of eight studio albums, 34 singles, 34 music videos, and two DVDs. Her debut album, Not That Kind, was released on June 16, 2000, and reached the top ten in eight countries in Europe and Asia. It went four times platinum in Europe and triple platinum in Australia; her debut single, "I'm Outta Love", was a global smash hit in 2000 topping the charts in Belgium, Australia and New Zealand, peaking at number two in France, Switzerland, Italy and Ireland as well as also reaching number six in Germany and the UK. The second single, "Not That Kind", reached number 11 in the UK and became a Top 10 hit in Italy; it also entered the Top 20 in Switzerland and France. "Cowboys & Kisses" was released as the third single off the album, charting in the top forty in some European countries. As the last promotional-only single, "Made for Lovin' You" charted in the UK at number twenty-seven and in France at number seventy-two.

Her second album, Freak of Nature, released in 2001, achieved successful sales in the UK where it went triple platinum as well as being a hit throughout continental Europe; however, unlike her debut it did not match the same level of international success. The first single released was "Paid My Dues". The song became an overall hit, in 2001, peaking in Denmark, Italy, Norway and Switzerland, and reaching the top ten in several other mainland European countries. The second single, released in 2002, "One Day in Your Life", reached number eleven in the UK and the top ten in many European countries. The next single, "Why'd You Lie to Me", reached the top thirty in the UK. "You'll Never Be Alone", the fourth single, reached number twenty-eight on the Adult Contemporary chart in the US.

Anastacia quickly became her most successful album to date, giving her a number one album in the UK where it has been certified 4× platinum, and reaching the top of national charts in Ireland, the Netherlands, Australia, Greece and Germany. Unlike her first two albums, which were released in her homeland of America, Anastacia was not, despite being scheduled for release on three occasions. The first single, released in March, was "Left Outside Alone", which saw a change in direction for Anastacia. It was one of the biggest songs in Europe of 2004, reaching number one in Austria, Italy, Spain and Switzerland; number two in Denmark, Germany, Ireland, the Netherlands and Norway; and number three in the United Kingdom and Hungary. The song also peaked atop the Australian chart, where it went on to become the country's second biggest-selling single of 2004. Anastacia released three further internationally successful singles: "Sick and Tired" (which gave her another number one in Spain and another UK top five single), "Welcome to My Truth" (her best-selling hit in Spain), and the ballad "Heavy on My Heart", proceeds from the sale of which went towards her Anastacia Fund (a charitable organization providing research funding for breast cancer).

On July 24, Anastacia announced that her fourth studio album Heavy Rotation would be released October 27, 2008, in Europe and Asia (and elsewhere in 2009). Her fourth studio album proved to be less successful than her previous ones; her singles failed to reach the top 40 in her most commercially successful country (UK). The album's first single, "I Can Feel You", began playing in some radio markets on August 25, 2008. The second single from Heavy Rotation, "Absolutely Positively", later served as a promotional single only. The third official single from the album had been confirmed as "Defeated" and was released as a promotional single only in Europe without a music video. It's a Man's World, an album of covers of songs by male rock artists, was released on November 9, 2012. Anastacia confirmed via her Twitter account that she was currently writing songs for producers John Fields and Steve Diamond, and also recording her sixth studio album, which would return to her own chosen "sprock" sound. The album, Resurrection, was released in May 2014 with the lead single, "Stupid Little Things", released on April 4. In 2017, a new album, Evolution, was released, which charted in various European countries.

== Albums ==
=== Studio albums ===
Title	Details	Peak chart positions										Certifications
Title	Details	AUS	AUT	FRA	GER	ITA	NLD	SPA	SWE	SWI	UK	Certifications
Not That Kind	Released: June 15, 2000; Label: Epic, Daylight; Formats: CD, LP, cassette	2	3	6	2	5	1	25	9	1	2	AUS: 3× Platinum; AUT: Platinum; FRA: 2× Platinum; GER: 5× Gold; NLD: 3× Platinum; SPA: Gold; SWE: Gold; SWI: 3× Platinum; UK: 3× Platinum
Freak of Nature	Released: November 23, 2001; Label: Epic, Daylight; Formats: CD, cassette	10	2	15	1	3	1	13	1	1	4	AUS: Platinum; AUT: Platinum; FRA: 2× Gold; GER: 3× Platinum; SPA: Platinum; SWE: 2× Platinum; SWI: 5× Platinum; UK: 3× Platinum
Anastacia	Released: March 29, 2004; Label: Epic; Formats: CD, digital download	1	1	14	1	2	1	2	1	1	1	AUS: 2× Platinum; AUT: 2× Platinum; FRA: Gold; GER: 5× Platinum; ITA: 2× Platinum; SPA: 2× Platinum; SWE: Platinum; SWI: 3× Platinum; UK: 4× Platinum
Heavy Rotation	Released: October 24, 2008; Label: Mercury; Formats: CD, digital download	47	6	60	13	6	15	3	15	3	17	SWE: Gold; SWI: Gold
It's a Man's World	Released: November 9, 2012; Label: BMG; Formats: CD, digital download	—	14	—	16	—	7	89	—	16	—	
Resurrection	Released: May 2, 2014; Label: BMG; Formats: CD, digital download	—	11	33	5	5	7	12	—	5	9	
Evolution	Released: September 15, 2017; Label: Universal; Formats: CD, digital download	—	15	—	12	12	86	16	—	10	— (Note: Evolution did not enter the UK Albums Chart, but peaked at number 34 on the UK Albums Downloads Chart on September 22, 2017.)	
Our Songs	Released: September 22, 2023; Label: Stars by Edel; Formats: CD, digital download, LP	—	5	—	2	—	—	—	—	8	— (Note: Our Songs did not enter the UK Albums Chart, but peaked at number 16 on the UK Albums Downloads Chart on September 29, 2023.)	GER: Gold
Symphonic Revolution	Scheduled: November 20, 2026; Label: Stars by Edel; Formats: CD, digital download, LP	To be released										
"—" denotes an album that did not chart.

=== Compilation albums ===
Title	Album details	Peak chart positions										Certifications
Title	Album details	AUS	AUT	GER	IRE	ITA	NLD	SPA	SWE	SWI	UK	Certifications
Pieces of a Dream	Released: November 7, 2005; Label: Epic; Formats: CD, digital download	23	4	7	11	3	10	9	23	3	6	AUS: Gold; AUT: Platinum; GER: Platinum; IRE: Platinum; SPA: Gold; SWI: Platinum; UK: Platinum
Ultimate Collection	Released: November 6, 2015; Label: Sony; Formats: CD, digital download	—	—	65	98	27	69	51	—	41	10	UK: Gold

=== Live albums ===
Title	Album details
A 4 App	Released: December 16, 2016; Label: Sony; Formats: CD, LP, digital download
Live at the O2 Apollo Manchester 2017	Released: May 29, 2017; Label: Sony; Formats: CD, digital download
Live at the Eventim Apollo Hammersmith 2017	Released: June 12, 2017; Label: Sony; Formats: CD, digital download
NTK25 – Live in Concert	Released: February 20, 2026; Label: Edel; Formats: CD, LP, digital download

=== Video albums ===
Title	Details	Notes	Certifications
One Day in Your Life	Released: August 20, 2002; Label: Epic, Epic Music Video	Music video for "One Day in Your Life"; Biography; The making of "One Day in Your Life"	
The Video Collection	Released: December 2, 2002; Label: Epic, Epic Music Video	10 music videos; The making of 4 music videos; 2 remix videos; A biography and photo gallery	GER: Gold; UK: Gold
Live at Last	Released: March 27, 2006; Label: Epic, Epic Music Video	Concerts footage (Berlin and Munich); Documentary; 4 music videos; 5 alternate videos	
#NTK25 – Live in Concert	Released: February 20, 2026; Label: Stars by Edel	95 minutes. Concerts footage from Brussels, Belgium. Recorded on April 14, 2025	

== Singles ==
=== As lead artist ===
Year	Title	Peak chart positions										Certifications	Album
Year	Title	AUS	AUT	FRA	GER	ITA	NLD	SPA	SWE	SWI	UK	Certifications	Album
2000	"I'm Outta Love"	1	3	2	6	2	3	10	15	2	6	AUS: 2× Platinum; AUT: Gold; FRA: Gold; GER: Gold; SWE: Gold; SWI: Gold; UK: Platinum	Not That Kind
2000	"Not That Kind"	21	68	13	56	9	26	9	49	18	11	FRA: Gold	Not That Kind
2001	"Cowboys & Kisses"	—	—	—	83	35	25	—	—	33	28		Not That Kind
2001	"Made for Lovin' You"	—	—	72	—	—	—	—	—	—	27		Not That Kind
2001	"Paid My Dues"	39	3	10	3	5	4	7	2	1	14	AUT: Gold; FRA: Gold; GER: Gold; SWI: Gold	Freak of Nature
2002	"One Day in Your Life"	6	9	27	9	7	8	10	16	5	11	AUS: Gold	Freak of Nature
2002	"Boom"	23	37	—	35	10	40	14	7	10	—		The Official Album of the 2002 FIFA World Cup
2002	"Why'd You Lie to Me"	66	37	—	55	31	13	—	25	39	25		Freak of Nature
2002	"You'll Never Be Alone"	—	42	—	56	28	—	—	34	36	31		Freak of Nature
2003	"Love Is a Crime"	—	—	—	—	—	—	—	—	—	—		Chicago: Music from the Miramax Motion Picture
2004	"Left Outside Alone"	1	1	9	2	1	2	1	6	1	3	AUS: 2× Platinum; AUT: Gold; GER: Gold; SWI: Gold; UK: Platinum	Anastacia
2004	"Sick and Tired"	8	2	—	2	3	2	3	10	2	4	AUS: Gold; GER: Gold; UK: Silver	Anastacia
2004	"Welcome to My Truth"	41	41	—	30	14	14	4	49	35	25		Anastacia
2005	"Heavy on My Heart"	55	29	—	29	12	16	8	—	35	21		Anastacia
2005	"Pieces of a Dream"	—	29	—	20	3	8	1	—	18	48		Pieces of a Dream
2006	"I Belong to You" (with Eros Ramazzotti)	—	2	—	1	1	7	—	—	1	—	AUT: Gold; GER: Gold; ITA: Gold; SWI: Gold	Pieces of a Dream
2008	"I Can Feel You"	— (Note: "I Can Feel You" did not enter the ARIA Singles Chart, but peaked at number 31 on the ARIA Physical Singles Chart.)	20	—	25	11	24	—	17	27	67		Heavy Rotation
2009	"Absolutely Positively"	—	—	—	—	—	—	—	—	—	—		Heavy Rotation
2009	"Defeated"	—	—	—	—	—	—	—	—	—	—		Heavy Rotation
2012	"What Can We Do (Deeper Love)"	—	—	—	—	—	—	—	—	—	—		Non-album single
2012	"Dream On"	—	—	—	—	—	—	—	—	—	—		It's a Man's World
2012	"Best of You"	—	—	—	—	—	—	—	—	—	—		It's a Man's World
2014	"Stupid Little Things"	—	45	115	38	20	—	26	—	23	— (Note: "Stupid Little Things" did not enter the UK Singles Chart, but debuted and peaked at number 20 on the UK Independent Singles Chart on May 17, 2014.)	ITA: Gold; SWI: Gold	Resurrection
2014	"Staring at the Sun"	—	—	—	—	—	—	—	—	—	—		Resurrection
2014	"Lifeline"	—	—	—	—	—	—	—	—	—	—		Resurrection
2015	"Take This Chance"	—	—	—	—	—	—	—	—	—	—		Ultimate Collection
2015	"Army of Me"	—	—	—	—	—	—	—	—	—	—		Ultimate Collection
2017	"Caught in the Middle"	—	—	—	—	—	—	—	—	—	—		Evolution
2020	"Stronger (What Doesn't Kill You)"	—	—	—	—	—	—	—	—	—	—		Goodnight Songs for Rebel Girls
2022	"American Night"	—	—	—	—	—	—	—	—	—	—		American Night
2023	"Best Days"	—	—	—	—	—	—	—	—	—	— (Note: "Best Days" did not enter the UK Singles Chart Top 100, but debuted at number 70 on the UK Singles Downloads Chart Top 100.)		Our Songs
2023	"Supergirl"	—	—	—	—	—	—	—	—	—	—		Our Songs
2023	"Now or Never"	—	—	—	—	—	—	—	—	—	—		Our Songs
2023	"Just You" (with Peter Maffay)	—	—	—	—	—	—	—	—	—	—		Our Songs
2024	"Highs & Lows"	—	—	—	—	—	—	—	—	—	—		Our Songs
2026	"Left Outside Alone (Symphonic Revolution version)"	—	—	—	—	—	—	—	—	—	—		Symphonic Revolution
"—" denotes a single that did not chart, or was not released in that territory.

=== Collaborations ===
Year	Single	Album
1993	"Forever Luv" (David Morales, The Bad Yard Club and Anastacia)	The Program
1998	"Mi Negra, Tu Bombón" (Omar Sosa and Anastacia)	Spirit of the Roots
1999	"Tienes Un Solo" (Omar Sosa and Anastacia)	Spirit of the Roots
2000	"Saturday Night's Alright for Fighting" (with Elton John)	Elton John One Night Only – The Greatest Hits
2001	"Let It Be" (performed by Paul McCartney, Anastacia and other artists)	Nobel Peace Prize Concert
2001	"I Ask of You" (Anastacia with Luciano Pavarotti)	Pavarotti & Friends May 29, 2001, for Afghanistan
2001	"What More Can I Give" (Michael Jackson and various artists)	United We Stand: What More Can I Give benefit concert
2001	"Love Is Alive" (Anastacia with Vonda Shepard)	Ally McBeal: For Once in My Life
2001	"911" (Wyclef Jean featuring Anastacia)	Non-album single
2001	"I Thought I Told You That" (Anastacia featuring Faith Evans)	Freak of Nature
2002	"You Shook Me All Night Long" (with Celine Dion)	Divas Las Vegas
2002	"Bad Girls" (Anastacia featuring Jamiroquai)	2002 BRIT Awards
2003	"We Are the Champions", "We Will Rock You, "Amandla" (Anastacia with Queen, Beyoncé, Bono, Cast and David A. Stewart)	46664
2004	"I Do" (Anastacia featuring Sonny Sandoval)	Anastacia
2005	"Everything Burns" (Ben Moody featuring Anastacia)	Fantastic 4: The Album and Pieces of a Dream
2006	"I Belong to You" (Eros Ramazzotti )	Calma Apparente
2007	"Sing" (Annie Lennox and various artists)	Songs of Mass Destruction
2009	"Stalemate" (Ben's Brother featuring Anastacia)	Battling Giants
2010	"Safety" (Dima Bilan featuring Anastacia)	Mechtatel
2010	"Burning Star" (Natalia and Anastacia)	Best of Natalia
2011	"What Can We Do (Deeper Love)" (Tiësto featuring Anastacia)	Non-album singles
2012	"If I Was Your Boyfriend" (Tony Moran and Anastacia)	Non-album singles
2014	"Lifeline (Luce per sempre)" (Anastacia and Kekko Silvestre)	Resurrection
2015	"Who's Loving You" (Auryn and Anastacia)	Ghost Town
2017	"Ti amo" (Umberto Tozzi and Anastacia)	40 anni che ti amo
2018	"Another Night" (Alex Christensen featuring Anastacia)	Classical 90s Dance 2
2018	"Mr. Vain" (Alex Christensen featuring Anastacia)	Classical 90s Dance 2

== Other appearances ==
Year	Song	Album / Event
2002	"One Day in Your Life" "Elvis Medley Finale: Jailhouse Rock"	Divas Las Vegas
2002	"Some Day My Prince Will Come"	DisneyMania
2003	"Love Is a Crime"	Chicago: Music from the Miramax Motion Picture
2020	"Stronger"	Goodnight Songs for Rebel Girls

== Music videos ==
List of music videos
Title	Year	Director(s)	Ref.
"I'm Outta Love"	1999	Nigel Dick	
"Not That Kind"	2000	Marc Webb	
"Cowboys & Kisses"	2001	Nigel Dick	
"Made for Lovin' You"	2001	Simon Hilton	
"Paid My Dues"	2001	Liz Friedlander	
"One Day in Your Life"	2002	Dave Meyers	
"Boom!"	2002	Marcos Siega	
"Why'd You Lie to Me"	2002	Mike Lipscombe	
"You'll Never Be Alone"	2002	Mike Lipscombe	
"Love Is a Crime"	2003	Matthew Rolston	
"Left Outside Alone"	2004	Bryan Barber	
"Sick and Tired"	2004	Philipp Stölzl	
"Welcome to My Truth"	2004	Diane Martel	
"Heavy on My Heart"	2005	Ronald Vietz	
"Left Outside Alone"	2005	David Lippman, Charles Mehling	
"Everything Burns"	2005	Antti Jokinen	
"Pieces of a Dream"	2005	David Lippman, Charles Mehling	
"I Belong to You"	2006	Don Allan	
"I Can Feel You"	2008	Chris Applebaum	
"Absolutely Positively"	2008	Nigel Dick	
"What Can We Do (A Deeper Love)"	2012	Peter Svenson	
"Best of You"	2012	Marcus Sternberg	
"Stupid Little Things"	2014	Marcus Sternberg	
"Staring at the Sun"	2014	DJay Brawner	
"Staring at the Sun" (Digital Dog Remix)	2014	Ricki Neill	
"Lifeline"/"Luce per sempre"	2014	Unknown	
"Take This Chance"	2015	Unknown	
"Who's Loving You"	2016	Unknown	
"Caught in the Middle"	2017	Peter Svenson	
"Another Night"	2018	Marcell Brell	
"American Night"	2022	Unknown	
"Best Days"	2023	Marcell Brell	
"Now or Never"	2023	Marcell Brell	
"Just You"	2023	Marcell Brell	
