= Live at Last (Anastacia video) =

Anastacia: Live at Last

Video by Anastacia
- Released: March 27, 2006
- Genre: Pop rock
- Length: (Disc 1) 1 hour, 33 min. (Disc 2) 1 hour, 27 min, 5 sec.
- Label: Epic Music Video
- Director: Jim Gable

Anastacia chronology
| The Video Collection (2002) | Anastacia: Live at Last (2006) |

Anastacia: Live at Last is a DVD collection from pop/rock music singer Anastacia, released on March 27, 2006. It is her first full live concert DVD. It includes footage from her Live at Last tour concerts in Berlin (Velodrom – October 24, 2004) and Munich (Olympiahalle – October 26, 2004). It does however omit one track that was performed, "One Day in Your Life", that was usually performed by Anastacia with two members of the audience in a "sing-off" competition. The second disc also features her four last single music videos and five alternate videos to songs.

== Track list ==
Disc 1 – Concert

1. Opening Sequence
2. Intro
3. "Seasons Change"
4. "Why'd You Lie to Me"
5. "Sick and Tired"
6. "Secrets"
7. "Not That Kind"
8. "Funky Band Breakdown"
9. "Freak of Nature"
10. "Ballet Interlude"
11. "Black Roses"
12. "You'll Never Be Alone"
13. "Heavy on My Heart"
14. "Welcome to My Truth"
15. "Underground Army"
16. "Who's Gonna Stop the Rain"
17. "Overdue Goodbye"
18. "Time"
19. "Left Outside Alone"
20. "I Do"
21. "Make a Difference Exit"
22. "Paid My Dues"
23. "I'm Outta Love"

Disc 2 – Bonus features

- The Making of "Live at Last" & "Encore Tour" [Documentary Film] (1 hour, 03 sec.)
- Concert Playback Videos to:

1. "Seasons Change" – 4:17
2. "Rearview" – 4:12
3. "Underground Army" – 4:22
4. "Time (Video Remix)" – 2:34
5. "I Do" – 3:30

- Music videos:

1. "Everything Burns" (Music Video Version) (Featuring Ben Moody) – 3:38
2. "Left Outside Alone (U.S.Music Video Version)" – 4:17
3. "Pieces of a Dream (Music Video Version)" – 4:03
4. "I Belong to You" (Featuring Eros Ramazzotti) – 4:24

== One Day in Your life ==
The performance One Day in Your Life isn't included on the DVD, although it was performed in every venue, as a sing-a-long with audience members.

== Charts ==
| Chart (2006) | Peak position |
|---|---|
| Australian Music DVDs Chart | 33 |
| Austrian Music DVDs Chart | 1 |
| Belgian (Flanders) Music DVDs Chart | 2 |
| Belgian (Wallonia) Music DVDs Chart | 2 |
| Czech Republic Music Videos Chart | 1 |
| Danish Music DVDs Chart | 5 |
| Dutch Music DVDs Chart | 2 |
| Finnish Music DVDs Chart | 1 |
| German Albums Chart | 23 |
| Greek Music DVDs Chart | 5 |
| Hungarian Music DVDs Chart | 4 |
| Italian Music DVDs Chart | 1 |
| Portuguese Music DVDs Chart | 3 |
| Spanish Music DVDs Chart | 3 |
| Swedish Music DVDs Chart | 3 |
