= Live at Last Tour =

2004–05 concert tour by Anastacia

- Tour by Anastacia
- Promotional poster for tour
- Location: Europe
- Associated album: Anastacia
- Start date: September 28, 2004
- End date: August 14, 2005
- Legs: 3
- No. of shows: 83

Anastacia concert chronology
- Live at Last Tour (2004–05); Heavy Rotation Tour (2009)

The Live at Last Tour (also known as the Encore Tour in the summer of 2005) was the first concert tour by American recording artist Anastacia in support of her third studio album, Anastacia (2004). The tour played over 80 shows across Europe.

== Setlist ==
Live at Last
1. "Video Sequence"
2. "Seasons Change"
3. "Why'd You Lie to Me"
4. "Sick and Tired"
5. "Secrets"
6. "Instrumental Sequence" (contains excerpts of "Sexy M.F.", "Play That Funky Music" and "Underdog")
7. "Not That Kind" / "Freak of Nature"
8. "Black Roses"
9. "You'll Never Be Alone"
10. "Heavy on My Heart"
11. "Welcome to My Truth"
12. "One Day in Your Life" (performed with audience members)
13. "Video Sequence" (contains excerpts from "Underground Army")
14. "Who's Gonna Stop The Rain" / "Overdue Goodbye"
15. "Video Sequence" (contains excerpts from "Time")
16. "Left Outside Alone"
17. "I Do"

Encore:

18. "Paid My Dues"
19. "I'm Outta Love"
Encore Tour
1. "Video Sequence"
2. "Seasons Change"
3. "Why'd You Lie To Me"
4. "Rearview"
5. "Sick And Tired"
6. "Secrets"
7. "Instrumental Sequence" (contains excerpts of "Sexy M.F.", "Play That Funky Music" and "Underdog")
8. "Not That Kind" / "Don'tcha Wanna" / "Freak of Nature"
9. "Black Roses"
10. "You'll Never Be Alone"
11. "Heavy on My Heart"
12. "Welcome to My Truth" ^{1}
13. "One Day in Your Life"
14. "Video Sequence" (contains excerpts from "Underground Army")
15. "Who's Gonna Stop The Rain" / "Overdue Goodbye" / "The Saddest Part"
16. "Video Sequence" (contains excerpts from "Time")
17. "Everything Burns"
18. "Left Outside Alone"
19. "I Do"

Encore:

20. "Paid My Dues"
21. "I'm Outta Love"

^{1} Performed at select concerts

== Tour dates ==
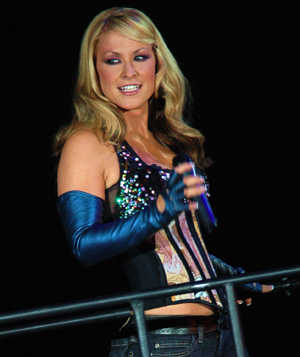
Anastacia performing during her 2005 European Tour.

Live at Last Tour

Date	City	Country	Venue
Europe
September 25, 2004	Rotterdam	Netherlands	Rotterdam Ahoy
September 28, 2004	Rotterdam	Netherlands	Rotterdam Ahoy
September 30, 2004	Frankfurt	Germany	Festhalle Frankfurt
October 2, 2004	Münchenstein	Switzerland	St. Jakobshalle
October 4, 2004	Stuttgart	Germany	Hanns-Martin-Schleyer-Halle
October 6, 2004	Paris	France	Zénith de Paris
October 8, 2004	Antwerp	Belgium	Sportpaleis
October 10, 2004	Oberhausen	Germany	König Pilsener Arena
October 12, 2004	Hamburg	Germany	Color Line Arena
October 14, 2004	Oslo	Norway	Oslo Spektrum
October 16, 2004	Gothenburg	Sweden	Scandinavium
October 18, 2004	Stockholm	Sweden	Stockholm Globe Arena
October 20, 2004	Copenhagen	Denmark	Forum Copenhagen
October 22, 2004	Hanover	Germany	Preussag Arena
October 24, 2004	Berlin	Germany	Velodrom
October 26, 2004	Munich	Germany	Olympiahalle
October 28, 2004	Milan	Italy	FilaForum
October 30, 2004	Vienna	Austria	Wiener Stadthalle
November 1, 2004	Cologne	Germany	Kölnarena
November 3, 2004	Birmingham	England	NEC Arena
November 5, 2004	Manchester	England	Manchester Evening News Arena
November 7, 2004	Glasgow	Scotland	SECC Concert Hall 4
November 9, 2004	Belfast	Northern Ireland	Odyssey Arena
November 11, 2004	Dublin	Ireland	Point Theatre
November 14, 2004	London	England	Wembley Arena
November 16, 2004	London	England	Wembley Arena
November 20, 2004	Badalona	Spain	Palau Municipal d'Esports de Badalona
November 22, 2004	Madrid	Spain	Palacio Vistalegre
November 24, 2004	Lisbon	Portugal	Pavilhão Atlântico
February 4, 2005	Antwerp	Belgium	Sportpaleis
February 6, 2005	Geneva	Switzerland	SEG Geneva Arena
February 7, 2005	Geneva	Switzerland	SEG Geneva Arena
February 9, 2005	Casalecchio di Reno	Italy	PalaMalaguti
February 11, 2005	Bolzano	Italy	PalaOnda
February 13, 2005	Graz	Austria	Stadthalle Graz
February 15, 2005	Vienna	Austria	Wiener Stadthalle
February 17, 2005	Budapest	Hungary	Papp László Budapest Sportaréna
February 19, 2005	Ljubljana	Slovenia	Hala Tivoli
February 21, 2005	Prague	Czech Republic	T-Mobile Arena
February 23, 2005	Frankfurt	Germany	Festhalle Frankfurt
February 25, 2005	Rotterdam	Netherlands	Rotterdam Ahoy Sportpaleis
February 26, 2005	Rotterdam	Netherlands	Rotterdam Ahoy Sportpaleis
March 1, 2005	Cologne	Germany	Kölnarena
March 3, 2005	Nuremberg	Germany	Nuremberg Arena
March 5, 2005	Karlsruhe	Germany	Europahalle
March 7, 2005	Bremen	Germany	AWD-Dome
March 10, 2005	Helsinki	Finland	Hartwall Areena
March 11, 2005	Helsinki	Finland	Hartwall Areena
March 16, 2005	Dortmund	Germany	Westfalenhallen
March 18, 2005	Leipzig	Germany	Arena Leipzig
March 20, 2005	London	England	Wembley Arena Pavilion
March 21, 2005	London	England	Wembley Arena Pavilion
March 24, 2005	Sheffield	England	Hallam FM Arena
March 26, 2005	Manchester	England	Manchester Evening News Arena
March 28, 2005	Newcastle	England	Metro Radio Arena
March 30, 2005	Glasgow	Scotland	SECC Concert Hall 4
April 1, 2005	Birmingham	England	NEC Arena
April 3, 2005	Friedrichshafen	Germany	Halle A1
April 5, 2005	Munich	Germany	Olympiahalle
April 6, 2005	Munich	Germany	Olympiahalle

Encore Tour

Date	City	Country	Venue
Europe
June 29, 2005	Wals-Siezenheim	Austria	Stadion Wals-Siezenheim
July 1, 2005	Nuremberg	Germany	Luitpoldhain
July 3, 2005	Wolfsburg	Germany	Volkswagen Arena
July 6, 2005^{[A]}	Frankfurt	Germany	Hauptwache
July 8, 2005	Arnhem	Netherlands	GelreDome XS
July 10, 2005	Koblenz	Germany	Kurfürstliches Schloss
July 12, 2005	Mannheim	Germany	Maimarktgelände
July 14, 2005	Warwickshire	England	Warwick Castle
July 17, 2005	Dublin	Ireland	Marlay Park
July 19, 2005^{[B]}	Liverpool	England	Big Top Arena
July 22, 2005^{[C]}	Ischgl	Austria	Idalp-Openairbühne
July 24, 2005	Cernobbio	Italy	Villa Erba
July 26, 2005^{[D]}	Rome	Italy	Ippodromo delle Capannelle
July 28, 2005	Catanzaro	Italy	Arena Magna Grecia
July 30, 2005	Genoa	Italy	Piazza del Mare
August 1, 2005	Pula	Croatia	Pula Arena
August 3, 2005^{[E]}	Nîmes	France	Arena of Nîmes
August 5, 2005^{[F]}	Monte Carlo	Monaco	Salle des Étoiles
August 7, 2005	Bratislava	Slovakia	Štadión Petržalka
August 10, 2005	Malmö	Sweden	Mölleplatsen
August 12, 2005	Bergen	Norway	Koengen
August 14, 2005^{[G]}	Skanderborg	Denmark	Bøgescenerne

Festivals and other miscellaneous performances
^{A} Opern Air
^{B} Liverpool Summer Pops
^{C} Top of the Mountain Summer Concert
^{D} Romarock Festival
^{E} Festival de Nîmes
^{F} Monaco Red Cross Ball
^{G} Smukfest

Cancellations and rescheduled shows

March 14, 2005	Horsens, Denmark	Forum Horsens Arena	Cancelled
June 27, 2005	Berlin, Germany	Kindl-Bühne Wuhlheide	Cancelled
July 12, 2005	Ludwigshafen, Germany	Südweststadion	Moved to the Maimarktgelände in Mannheim, Germany
July 24, 2005	Como, Germany	Stadio Giuseppe Sinigaglia	Moved to Villa Erba in Cernobbio, Italy

== Broadcasts and recordings ==
DVD cover of Anastacia's Live at Last

The DVD features footage from her Berlin and Munich concerts of the Fall 2004 leg of the tour. It omits the song One Day in Your Life (performed as a duet between two audience members) for unexplained reasons . Along with the concert, the DVD also contains a documentary. It includes interviews with Anastacia along with music videos to five unreleased songs from Anastacia:

- "Underground Army"
- "I Do"
- "Rearview"
- "Seasons Change"
- "Time" (Video Remix)

along with the music videos of:

- "Left Outside Alone" (US Version)
- "Everything Burns"
- "Pieces Of A Dream"
- "I Belong to You"

Other special features include performances of "Rearview", "One Day in Your Life" and "The Saddest Part" from the "Encore Tour". The DVD was not released in North America which came as a huge disappointment to fans.

== Personnel ==
Live at Last 2004

Band

- Music Director & lead guitar: Rob Bacon
- Guitar: Michael "Fish" Herring
- Bass: Robert "JJ" Smith
- Keyboards: Michael Bluestein
- Drums: Chris "CJ" Johnson

Backup singers

- Dee Dee Foster
- Cindy Mizelle
- Lisa Vaughn

Dancers

- Shana Lord
- Jon Cruz
- Raistalla
- Michael Cothren Pena

Live at Last (2005)

Band

- Lead guitar: Rob Bacon
- Guitar: Yogi Lonich
- Bass: Robert "JJ" Smith
- Keyboards: Michael Bluestein
- Drums: Chris "CJ" Johnson

Backup singers

- Dee Dee Foster
- Cindy Mizelle
- Brandon Rogers

Dancers

- Shana Lord
- Jon Cruz
- Yayoi Ito
- Michael Cothren Pena

The Encore Tour

Band

- Lead guitar: Tony Bruno
- Guitar: Yogi Lonich
- Bass: Robert "JJ" Smith
- Keyboards: Michael Bluestein
- Drums: Chris "CJ" Johnson

Backup singers

- Dee Dee Foster
- Cindy Mizelle
- Brandon Rogers

Dancers

- Shana Lord
- Jon Cruz
- Yayoi Ito
- Jose Cueva
