= Canela Cox =

American singer-songwriter

- Born: Canela Cox; 1984 (age 41–42); Los Angeles, California, US
- Genre: R&B
- Occupation: Singer-songwriter
- Years active: 2000–present
- Labels: DreamWorks Records (2001); Genuine/Monopoly Records (2004 – 2005; 2007–present)

Canela Cox, known mononynously as Canela, is an American singer-songwriter. An R&B artist, she is best known in the mixtape circuit for her DJ Clue-remixed song, "Sponsor", and for co-writing Anastacia's song "Why'd You Lie to Me". She once recorded an album in 2001, however it was shelved after her label folded.

== Biography ==
=== Early life ===
Cox was born in Los Angeles. She moved to Amsterdam at age 12, where her mother, former Diana Ross background vocalist Rocq-E Harrell, performed as an R&B singer and recording artist. Upon moving back to the United States at age 18, she continued to pursue her musical endeavors performing with numerous musical groups throughout Los Angeles.

=== 2000 – 2001 ===
In 2000, Cox was featured on Jennifer Lopez's multi-plantinum selling single, "Love Don't Cost a Thing" as a background vocalist. While performing with Lopez at a Los Angeles concert, her talent was recognized by Rodney Jerkins, who brought her to DreamWorks Records' attention, and was immediately signed to the label in 2001.

In early 2001, Cox began to record for her self-titled debut album, which featured production by Darkchild, Tim & Bob, Lil' Mo, Fred Jerkins III, Brycyn Evans, & DJ Clue. She and DreamWorks announced at the time that it would be released sometime in December 2001.

Cox's single, "Sponsor", was released to radio in March 2001 during the process of the recording for her album. In addition to its release, a DJ Clue remix, featuring Fabolous, was released to mixtape circuits, which received heavy underground play. Both versions of the single, however, failed to chart.

Months following the failure of Cox's previous single, "Everything", produced by Darkchild, was released to radio as the official lead single for her debut. A music video was shot for the song, and was able to be viewed on BET's 106 & Park. However, "Everything" suffered the same failure as her buzz single. Because her single failed to chart, DreamWorks Records put a halt on Cox's debut.

In December 2001, just days before Cox's debut album was to be released, DreamWorks Records was bought by Universal Music Group, which caused the label to fold, thus the album was shelved.

=== 2002 – 2004 ===
Months after Cox dispersed from DreamWorks Records, she co-wrote Anastacia's 2002 single "Why'd You Lie to Me". She also provided vocals for rapper Won G's 2004 single "Caught Up in the Rapture".

In 2004, Cox was signed to Genuine Entertainment (in conjunction with Monopoly Records); there, Cox began recording for another album. Its buzz singles, "Blazed" and "Bedrock", were released through Monopoly Records in 2004, however neither single managed to chart. Because of lack of promotion and failed attempts to put out a single properly, Cox left Monopoly Records, and began singing and songwriting for other artists.

=== 2005–present ===
In 2005, Cox was featured as a background vocalist for the soundtrack to Coach Carter. Cox was also featured on rapper Ak'Sent's "Pick Up" the following year. Though the single failed to chart, it became an online success for both Cox & Ak'Sent.

Months following Cox's success with "Pick Up", Cox provided vocals for numerous Disney Channel soundtracks: High School Musical 2; The Proud Family, Jump In; and Cheetah Girls 2.

In 2006, Cox joined pop band, Anything but Monday; the group was featured in the reality show "30 Days 'til I'm Famous". The group's debut album has faced several delays and has yet to be released as of 2025.

In 2007, it was announced that Cox had rejoined her former indie label, Monopoly Records.

That same year, Cox began recording new material for her new album. She released the buzz single, "I'll C U Later" in early 2007, and went on to release two more — "I Want U for Me" and "Kiss 'N Tell" — a year later.

== Discography ==
=== Albums ===
Year	Album	Chart positions		RIAA Certification
Year	Album	US	U.S. R&B	RIAA Certification
2001	Canela	—	—	Shelved
TBA	Untitled Second Album	TBA	TBA	TBA

=== Singles ===
- 2001: "Sponsor"
- 2001: "Everything"
- 2004: "Caught Up in the Rapture" (Won-G feat. Canela Cox)
- 2004: "Blazed"
- 2004: "Bedrock" ^{1}
- 2006: "Pick Up" (Ak'Sent feat. Canela Cox)
- 2007: "I'll C U Later"
- 2008: "Kiss 'N Tell"
- 2008: "I Want U for Me"

^{1} later re-recorded by Ak'Sent & re-released in 2006
