= Freak of Nature =

2001 studio album by Anastacia

Studio album by Anastacia
- Released: November 23, 2001
- Studios: Cove City Sound Studios (Glen Cove, New York); The Dream Factory, Right Track Recording, Sony Music Studios (New York City, New York); Encore Studios (Burbank, California); Homesite 13 (Novato, California); Ocean Way Recording (Hollywood, California)
- Genres: Pop; dance; R&B; soul; rock; funk
- Length: 47:14
- Labels: Epic; Daylight
- Producers: Louis Biancaniello; Richie Jones; Ric Wake; Sam Watters

Anastacia chronology
Not That Kind (2000)	Freak of Nature (2001)	Anastacia (2004)

Singles from Freak of Nature
- 1. "Paid My Dues" Released: November 12, 2001; 2. "One Day in Your Life" Released: February 25, 2002; 3. "Boom" Released: March 20, 2002; 4. "Why'd You Lie to Me" Released: September 9, 2002; 5. "You'll Never Be Alone" Released: November 18, 2002

Freak of Nature is the second studio album by American singer Anastacia, released on November 23, 2001, by Epic Records and Daylight Records. The making of the album saw Anastacia refine the pop, R&B, soul, rock, and dance influences on Not That Kind, adopting a more focused and personal approach as she co-wrote the album’s songs, with lyrics exploring themes of self-confidence, resilience, relationships, and her experiences within the music industry. As with her debut, she collaborated with producers Ric Wake, Sam Watters, and Louis Biancaniello, with additional production from Richie Jones.

The album received mixed reviews, with critics praising Anastacia's powerful vocals, while some criticised its songwriting and production for being overly polished. Commercially, Freak of Nature became another major success, reaching number one in numerous European countries including Germany, the United Kingdom, Switzerland, Benelux, and Scandinavia, as well as number 27 on the US Billboard 200. The album earned extensive multi-platinum certifications across Europe, including 3× Platinum status in both Germany and the United Kingdom, and 5× Platinum in Switzerland.

The release of Freak of Nature was supported by several successful singles, including "Paid My Dues", "One Day in Your Life", "Why'd You Lie to Me", and "You'll Never Be Alone", with the first two becoming major international hits and reaching the top ten across multiple European markets. During the same era, Anastacia also released "Boom", the official song of the 2002 FIFA World Cup, which became a notable international success and later appeared on several reissues of the album. In further promotion, Anastacia also embarked on promotional album tour also titled Freak of Nature.

== Background ==
In March 1999, disappointed after years of bad luck in the music industry, Anastacia finally signed a contract with Daylight Records, a custom label of Sony Music Entertainment's Epic Records and began work on her debut album Not That Kind. Boosed by the success of lead single "I'm Outta Love", the album became a major breakthrough across Europe and other international markets, establishing Anastacia as one of Sony Music's fastest-rising artists and selling millions of copies worldwide. However, despite her growing popularity overseas, success in the United States remained limited, leading her team to develop a more extensive promotional strategy for her follow-up release.

Work on Freak of Nature focused on showing artistic growth while maintaining the pop, R&B, soul, rock, and dance influences that defined her debut. Anastacia co-wrote all of the album's songs and reteamed with producers Ric Wake, Sam Watters, and Louis Biancaniello to work on material for the album. The singer described the album as a more focused and confident project, explaining that she had a clearer understanding of herself as an artist and wanted to challenge herself both lyrically and musically. Musically, Freak of Nature expanded on the formula of Not That Kind with a mixture of powerful pop anthems, emotional ballads, funk influences, and R&B-driven tracks, many of which reflected Anastacia’s personal experiences and struggles within the music industry.

== Promotion ==
Freak of Nature was promoted through an extensive international campaign, with a strong initial focus on Europe followed by a structured rollout in the United States. In Europe, promotion was supported by continued media appearances, televised performances, and press engagement during a period in which Anastacia was already established as a prominent pop artist. The United States campaign was launched later and positioned as a more coordinated effort than that of her debut album Not That Kind. The US release included advance promotion such as press coverage, listening events, and industry showcases intended to increase exposure prior to and following release. Further promotion was driven by the release of "Boom", issued as the official song of the 2002 FIFA World Cup, which provided additional international visibility through association with a major global sporting event. The album's promotional cycle also included multiple remix commissions for club and radio formats, as well as wide distribution of music videos across major television networks including MTV, VH1, and MTV2.

=== Release ===
For the US edition of the album, three tracks, "One Day in Your Life", "You'll Never Be Alone", and "Don't Stop (Doin' It)", were remixed for inclusion. The release also featured a newly recorded song, "I Thought I Told You That", a collaboration with R&B singer Faith Evans. A European collector's edition followed in November 2002, expanding the album with a bonus disc that included "I Thought I Told You That", a cover of the Disney standard "Someday My Prince Will Come", and "Boom". The edition also added three remixes alongside two live recordings, further extending the album’s promotional cycle across European markets.

== Critical reception ==
Professional ratings
Review scores
Source	Rating
AllMusic	4/5 stars
The Encyclopedia of Popular Music	3/5 stars
Entertainment Weekly	B
Entertainment.ie	2/5 stars
MTV Asia	8/10
New York Post	4/4 stars
NME	2/10
Q	3/5 stars
Slant Magazine	3/5 stars
Yahoo! Music	7/10 stars

AllMusic editor Jose F. Promis found that Freak of Nature "continues with the late-'80s bombastic funk/soul/pop revival ushered in by her debut, Not That Kind, but this time there's a few more ballads in the mix [...] Reminiscent of Taylor Dayne at times, Anastacia successfully avoids the sophomore slump by delivering an album full of raw emotion, power, and musicality which manages to improve upon its predecessor." New York Post critic Dan Aquilante praised Anastacia’s surprising vocal style, noting that her "teen-pop appearance" contrasts with her "big, funkified, R&B/soul attack." He highlighted her Aretha Franklin, Donna Summer and Tina Turner influences, while praising "Why'd You Lie to Me" and "Overdue Goodbye."Entertainment Weekly noted that "Anastacia is really about R&B – in the Patti LaBelle-meets-Deborah Cox mode. Her second CD, Freak of Nature, is bombastic and overproduced, but Anastacia has major-league pipes, solid rhythm, and an ear for the commercial hook."

Aidin Vaziri from Rolling Stone wrote that Freak of Nature "is pure polish. With producer Rick Wake overseeing a majority of the cuts, the songs are tempered with as much plucky R&B; passion as they are cold hard dollar signs. Anastacia eases off the pummeling power ballads that made up most of her debut, but there are still moments of sheer overkill." Similarly, Yahoo! Music's James Salmon Overall cited the album as "highly polished, well-penned pop album that is given a much-needed edge by a performer whose voice should be bottled and donated to scientific research." He felt that "Anastacia does manage to vary both tempo and mood with considerable skill. Just when you think she's about to grind to an insipid halt she snaps out of it with good old fashioned pop rants against the male species."

Slant Magazine's Sal Cinquemani fel that Freak of Nature "steers clear of the power ballads that weighed down her debut. Though the album’s highlight is the summery, midtempo "Overdue Goodbye," Anastacia should keep the sloppy slow numbers to a minimum and, like a good bombastic diva-in-training, keep her eye on the dancefloor." In a negative review, Entertainment.ie wrote: "Anastacia's choice of material is consistently weak, largely built around 80's style power ballads that make her sound like a poor man's Tina Turner. Only on a handful of heavy, dramatic funk tracks is she allowed to really show what she can do. Freak of Nature is not without its merits as a pop album, but its title flatters itself." NME's Louis Pattison called the album an "inauspicious follow-up" and a "relic of pop days gone by". Blender rated the album one star out of five.

== Commercial performance ==
Freak of Nature was a major commercial success across Europe and was similarly successful in Europe as Anastacia's previous album Not That Kind, continuing her strong run of chart dominance across the continent. The album reached number one in numerous countries, including Belgium's Flemish region, Denmark, the Netherlands, Germany, Norway, Sweden, and Switzerland, as well as topping the European Top 100 Albums chart. It also performed strongly in other European markets, peaking at number 2 in Austria and Portugal, number 3 in Italy, and number 4 in the United Kingdom, alongside top-ten placements in Ireland, Scotland, Finland, Hungary, and Poland. Outside Europe, the album marked a significant breakthrough in the United States, where it became her highest-charting album on the US Billboard 200, peaking at number 27. It also charted in Australia , Japan, and New Zealand, though with comparatively lower peaks than Not That Kind.

The album demonstrated strong longevity, appearing on multiple year-end charts in both 2001 and 2002. It was particularly successful in continental Europe, finishing as high as number 2 on the 2002 European year-end chart and placing within the top ten year-end positions in countries such as Germany, Switzerland, Austria, and the Netherlands. In terms of sales, Freak of Nature received extensive multi-platinum certifications across Europe, including 3× Platinum in both Germany and the United Kingdom (900,000 units each) and 5× Platinum in Switzerland. It also achieved multi-platinum status in Sweden and the Netherlands, Platinum certifications in markets such as Australia, Austria, Belgium, Denmark, Spain, and Norway, and Gold certifications in France, Poland, Hungary, and New Zealand. Overall, the album was certified 3× Platinum by International Federation of the Phonographic Industry (IFPI) for Europe, indicating over 3 million units shipped across the continent.

== Track listing ==
Freak of Nature track listing
No.	Title	Writer(s)	Producer(s)	Length
1.	"Freak of Nature"	Anastacia; Richie Jones; Eric Kupper; Billy Mann	Ric Wake; Jones^{[a]}	3:39
2.	"Paid My Dues"	Greg Lawson; Damon Sharpe; LaMenga Kafi; Anastacia	Wake; Jones^{[a]}	3:21
3.	"Overdue Goodbye"	Anastacia; Mann	Wake; Jones^{[a]}	4:34
4.	"You'll Never Be Alone"	Anastacia; Sam Watters; Louis Biancaniello	Biancaniello; Watters	4:21
5.	"One Day in Your Life"	Anastacia; Watters; Biancaniello	Biancaniello; Watters	3:28
6.	"How Come the World Won't Stop"	Anastacia; Mann	Wake; Jones^{[a]}	4:03
7.	"Why'd You Lie to Me"	Anastacia; Sharpe; Lawson; Trey Parker; Damon Butler; Canela Cox	Wake	3:43
8.	"Don'tcha Wanna"	Anastacia; Watters; Biancaniello; Stevie Wonder; Yvonne Wright	Biancaniello; Watters	3:43
9.	"Secrets"	Anastacia; Brian James	Wake; Jones^{[a]}	5:22
10.	"Don't Stop (Doin' It)"	Anastacia; Watters; Biancaniello	Biancaniello; Watters	4:21
11.	"I Dreamed You"	Anastacia; Derek Bramble; Lindy Robbins	Wake	5:04
12.	"Overdue Goodbye (Reprise)"	Anastacia; Mann	Wake; Jones^{[a]}	1:35
Total length:				47:14

Japanese edition bonus track
No.	Title	Writer(s)	Producer(s)	Length
13.	"Boom" (2002 FIFA World Cup official song)	Anastacia; Glen Ballard	Ballard	3:19
Total length:				50:33

US edition
No.	Title	Writer(s)	Producer(s)	Length
1.	"Freak of Nature"	Anastacia; Jones; Kupper; Mann	Wake; Jones^{[a]}	3:39
2.	"Paid My Dues"	Lawson; Sharpe; Kafi; Anastacia	Wake; Jones^{[a]}	3:21
3.	"Overdue Goodbye"	Anastacia; Mann	Wake; Jones^{[a]}	4:34
4.	"You'll Never Be Alone" (US version)	Anastacia; Watters; Biancaniello	Biancaniello; Watters; Jones^{[a]}	4:39
5.	"One Day in Your Life" (US version)	Anastacia; Watters; Biancaniello	Biancaniello; Watters; Jones^{[a]}; Wake^{[a]}	3:50
6.	"How Come the World Won't Stop"	Anastacia; Mann	Wake; Jones^{[a]}	4:03
7.	"I Thought I Told You That" (featuring Faith Evans)	Miklós Malek; Nicole Renée; Anastacia	Wake	3:35
8.	"Why'd You Lie to Me"	Anastacia; Sharpe; Lawson; Parker; Butler; Cox	Wake	3:43
9.	"Don'tcha Wanna"	Anastacia; Watters; Biancaniello; Wonder; Wright	Biancaniello; Watters	3:43
10.	"Secrets"	Anastacia; James	Wake; Jones^{[a]}	5:22
11.	"Don't Stop (Doin' It)" (US version)	Anastacia; Watters; Biancaniello	Biancaniello; Watters; Jones^{[a]}; Shawn Lucas^{[a]}	4:27
12.	"I Dreamed You"	Anastacia; Bramble; Robbins	Wake	5:04
13.	"Overdue Goodbye (Reprise)"	Anastacia; Mann	Wake; Jones^{[a]}	1:35
Total length:				51:35

Collectors edition bonus disc
No.	Title	Writer(s)	Producer(s)	Length
1.	"I Thought I Told You That" (featuring Faith Evans)	Malek; Renée; Anastacia	Wake	3:35
2.	"Someday My Prince Will Come"	Frank Churchill; Larry Morey	Ballard	3:44
3.	"Boom" (2002 FIFA World Cup official song)	Anastacia; Ballard	Ballard	3:19
4.	"Paid My Dues" (The S-Man's Darkstar Mix)	Lawson; Sharpe; Kafi; Anastacia	Wake; Jones^{[a]}; Roger Sanchez^{[b]}	5:17
5.	"One Day in Your Life" (Hex Hector/Mac Quayle Club Mix)	Anastacia; Watters; Biancaniello	Wake; Jones^{[a]}; Hector^{[b]}	10:12
6.	"Why'd You Lie to Me" (Nu Soul DNB Mix)	Anastacia; Sharpe; Lawson; Parker; Butler; Cox	Wake; Charlie Rosario^{[b]}; Maurice Joshua^{[b]}	6:38
7.	"Freak of Nature" (live from Japan, September 13, 2002)	Anastacia; Jones; Kupper; Mann	Chuckii Booker	4:23
8.	"Overdue Goodbye" (live from Japan, September 13, 2002)	Anastacia; Mann	Booker	5:41
Total length:				42:49

Notes

- ^{^a} signifies an additional producer
- ^{^b} signifies a remixer
- "Boom" does not appear on the UK collectors edition bonus disc

Sample credits

- "Don'tcha Wanna" contains portions of "I Believe (When I Fall in Love It Will Be Forever)" by Stevie Wonder.

== Charts ==
=== Weekly charts ===
Weekly chart performance for Freak of Nature
Chart (2001–2002)	Peak position
Australian Albums (ARIA)	10
Austrian Albums (Ö3 Austria)	2
Belgian Albums (Ultratop Flanders)	1
Belgian Albums (Ultratop Wallonia)	12
Czech Albums (ČNS IFPI)	7
Danish Albums (Hitlisten)	1
Dutch Albums (Album Top 100)	1
European Albums (Music & Media)	1
Finnish Albums (Suomen virallinen lista)	8
French Albums (SNEP)	15
German Albums (Offizielle Top 100)	1
Hungarian Albums (MAHASZ)	5
Irish Albums (IRMA)	7
Italian Albums (FIMI)	3
Japanese Albums (Oricon)	59
New Zealand Albums (RMNZ)	39
Norwegian Albums (VG-lista)	1
Polish Albums (ZPAV)	7
Portuguese Albums (AFP)	2
Scottish Albums (Official Charts)	2
Spanish Albums (AFYVE)	13
Swedish Albums (Sverigetopplistan)	1
Swiss Albums (Schweizer Hitparade)	1
UK Albums (Official Charts)	4
US Billboard 200	27

=== Year-end charts ===
2001 year-end chart performance for Freak of Nature
Chart (2001)	Position
Austrian Albums (Ö3 Austria)	62
Danish Albums (Hitlisten)	14
Dutch Albums (Album Top 100)	28
Finnish Albums (Suomen virallinen lista)	53
French Albums (SNEP)	132
Italian Albums (FIMI)	22
Swedish Albums (Sverigetopplistan)	19
Swiss Albums (Schweizer Hitparade)	16
UK Albums (OCC)	52
Worldwide Albums (IFPI)	47

2002 year-end chart performance for Freak of Nature
Chart (2002)	Position
Australian Albums (ARIA)	53
Austrian Albums (Ö3 Austria)	4
Belgian Albums (Ultratop Flanders)	22
Belgian Albums (Ultratop Wallonia)	80
Danish Albums (Hitlisten)	19
Dutch Albums (Album Top 100)	7
European Albums (Music & Media)	2
French Albums (SNEP)	89
German Albums (Offizielle Top 100)	3
Italian Albums (FIMI)	19
Swedish Albums (Sverigetopplistan)	10
Swiss Albums (Schweizer Hitparade)	3
UK Albums (OCC)	29

== Certifications ==
Certifications for Freak of Nature
Region	Certification	Certified units/sales
Australia (ARIA)	Platinum	70,000^{^}
Austria (IFPI Austria)	Platinum	40,000^{*}
Belgium (BRMA)	Platinum	50,000^{*}
Denmark (IFPI Danmark)	Platinum	50,000^{^}
Finland (Musiikkituottajat)	Platinum	39,275
France (SNEP)	2× Gold	200,000^{*}
Germany (BVMI)	3× Platinum	900,000^{^}
Hungary (MAHASZ)	Gold	
Netherlands (NVPI)	2× Platinum	160,000^{^}
New Zealand (RMNZ)	Gold	7,500^{^}
Norway (IFPI Norway)	2× Platinum	100,000^{*}
Poland (ZPAV)	Gold	35,000^{*}
Spain (Promusicae)	Platinum	100,000^{^}
Sweden (GLF)	2× Platinum	160,000^{^}
Switzerland (IFPI Switzerland)	5× Platinum	200,000^{^}
United Kingdom (BPI)	3× Platinum	900,000^{^}
Summaries
Europe (IFPI)	3× Platinum	3,000,000^{*}
^{*} Sales figures based on certification alone.^{^} Shipments figures based on certification alone.

== Release history ==
Release dates and formats for Freak of Nature
Region	Date	Edition	Label	Ref.
Australia	November 23, 2001	Standard	Sony	
France	November 26, 2001	Standard	Sony	
Germany	November 26, 2001	Standard	Sony	
Italy	November 26, 2001	Standard	Sony	
United Kingdom	November 26, 2001	Standard	Epic	
United States	June 18, 2002	Standard	Epic; Daylight	
Japan	July 24, 2002	Standard	Sony Japan	
United Kingdom	November 11, 2002	Collectors	Epic	
Germany	November 11, 2002	Collectors	Sony	
France	November 18, 2002	Collectors	Sony	
