= The Video Collection (Anastacia video) =

Video by Anastacia
- Released: December 2, 2002
- Genres: Pop; R&B; soul; rock; house
- Length: over 90 min.
- Label: Epic Music Video

Anastacia chronology
The Video Collection (2002)	Live at Last (2006)

The Video Collection is a DVD compilation of ten music videos by American singer-songwriter Anastacia, released on December 2, 2002. The release features extras including a biography, four making-ofs and two remix videos.

== DVD features ==
- Music videos:

1. "I'm Outta Love" – 4:03
2. "Not That Kind" – 3:20
3. "Cowboys & Kisses" – 4:40
4. "Made for Lovin' You" – 3:36
5. "Paid My Dues" – 3:30
6. "One Day in Your Life" (U.S. Version) – 3:24
7. "One Day in Your Life" (International Version) – 3:24
8. "Boom" – 3:31
9. "Why'd You Lie to Me" – 3:42
10. "You'll Never Be Alone" – 4:03

- The making of:

1. "One Day in Your Life" Video – 25:03
2. "Boom" Video – 2:54
3. "Why'd You Lie to Me" Video – 3:44
4. "You'll Never Be Alone" Video – 9:26

- Remix videos:

1. "I'm Outta Love" (Hex Hector Remix) – 4:12
2. "Not That Kind" (Kerri Chandler Remix) – 3:56

- Special features:

- Biography
- Photo Gallery
- Who is Anastacia? – 4:14

== Charts and certification ==
=== Weekly charts ===
Chart (2002)	Peak
Austria	1
Finland	1
Chart (2004)	Peak
Spain	15
Chart (2005)	Peak
Portugal	20

=== Certifications ===
Country	Certification
Portugal	Gold
United Kingdom	Gold
Germany	Gold
