= One Day in Your Life (Anastacia song) =

2002 single by Anastacia

Single by Anastacia

from the album Freak of Nature
- Released: February 25, 2002
- Studio: Homesite 13 (Novato, California); Right Track (New York City)
- Genre: Disco
- Length: 3:28
- Label: Epic; Daylight
- Songwriters: Anastacia; Sam Watters; Louis Biancaniello
- Producers: Sam Watters; Louis Biancaniello

Anastacia singles chronology
"Paid My Dues" (2001)	"One Day in Your Life" (2002)	"Boom" (2002)

Music videos
- "One Day in Your Life" on YouTube; "One Day in Your Life" (international version) on YouTube

"One Day in Your Life" is a song by American singer Anastacia from her second studio album, Freak of Nature (2001). Co-written with and produced by Sam Watters and Louis Biancaniello, the song was released as the album's second single on February 25, 2002, by Daylight Records and Epic Records. It was the first single from Freak of Nature to be released in the United States, peaking at number one on the Billboard Dance Club Play chart.

== Composition ==
"One Day in Your Life" was written by Anastacia and co-written with and produced by Sam Watters and Louis Biancaniello. A "soulful" disco song, it features a funk synthesizer.

== Critical reception ==
Jose F. Promis from AllMusic called it "dramatic" and said that "it follows the same formula as her previous hit, 'I'm Outta Love,' but better, with more soaring, epic vocals, and sounds like a rock version of a forgotten disco classic." Mark Bautz from Entertainment Weekly commented that "it has a kicky Flashdance retro vibe." Aidin Vaziri from Rolling Stone called it "a moment of sheer overkill."

== Chart performance ==
Though "One Day in Your Life" never charted on the US Billboard Hot 100, it earned Anastacia her first chart-topper on the Billboard Dance Club Play chart, staying atop for one week. The single fared far better elsewhere, charting within the top ten in Australia and several European countries, including Austria, Germany, Hungary, Italy, the Netherlands, and Switzerland, while peaking at number 11 on the UK Singles Chart.

== Live performances ==
Anastacia performed "One Day in Your Life" at several live events such as the Edison Awards on February 27, 2002 (where she won the award for Best International Female), VH1's Divas Las Vegas on May 23, 2002, the Royal Variety Performance on December 2, 2002, and the Life Ball on May 20, 2006, as well as on television shows like Live with Regis and Kelly in the United States, Top of the Pops in the United Kingdom, Wetten, dass..? in Germany, and Rove Live in Australia. In addition, she performed the song on her 2004–05 Live at Last Tour (although it was not included on the Live at Last DVD) and on her 2009 Heavy Rotation Tour.

== Music videos ==
Being her first music video directed by Dave Meyers, who has also directed videos for Janet Jackson, Britney Spears, Pink, and Bow Wow, the video was shot on January 16–17, 2002 in Los Angeles and Santa Monica, California. In the beginning, while the sun is rising up, Anastacia is shown eating a bowl of cereal for breakfast, while singing the first verse of the song. After the slow opening, she dances through the room and you see other people in a sort of a game house. The video shows men playing volleyball on the beach and other people swimming in the pool. Then Anastacia is seen lying on a pool side with braids wearing a bikini. When the second chorus breaks, an old man sprinkles her wet using his hose. Next, the camera travels through a sand castle. When it gets out of the castle, Anastacia is seen dancing while behind her people are skateboarding on a ramp. An alternate version of the video also exists, which was released in the United States. This version of the video mainly contains footage from the regular video featuring some new scenes, from the same video shoot. Both versions are available on her The Video Collection DVD.

== Track listings ==
US DVD single

1. "One Day in Your Life" (video clip)
2. "One Day in Your Life" (video clip—US version)
3. "One Day in Your Life" (making of the video)

UK CD single

1. "One Day in Your Life" (album version) – 3:26
2. "One Day in Your Life" (M*A*S*H classic mix) – 7:41
3. "One Day in Your Life" (Almighty mix) – 7:44
4. "One Day in Your Life" (video)

UK cassette single

1. "One Day in Your Life" (album version) – 3:26
2. "One Day in Your Life" (M*A*S*H radio mix 2) – 3:56
3. "One Day in Your Life" (Almighty mix) – 7:44

European CD single

1. "One Day in Your Life" (album version) – 3:26
2. "One Day in Your Life" (M*A*S*H classic mix) – 8:48

Australian CD single

1. "One Day in Your Life" (album version)
2. "One Day in Your Life" (M*A*S*H radio mix)
3. "One Day in Your Life" (Almighty mix)
4. "One Day in Your Life" (M*A*S*H classic mix)
5. "One Day in Your Life" (video)

Japanese CD single

1. "One Day in Your Life" (album version) – 3:27
2. "Bad Girls" (live at the Brits 2002 with Jamiroquai) – 4:13
3. "One Day in Your Life" (M*A*S*H radio mix) – 3:38
4. "One Day in Your Life" (Almighty dub) – 6:00

== Credits and personnel ==
Credits are adapted from the UK CD single liner notes.

Studios

- Recorded at Homesite 13 (Novato, California) and Right Track Recording (New York City)
- Mixed at Homesite 13 (Novato, California)

Personnel

- Anastacia – writing, vocals, background vocals
- Sam Watters – writing, background vocals, production, arrangement, engineering
- Louis Biancaniello – writing, keyboards, production, arrangement, mixing, programming, engineering
- Dameon Aranda – guitar
- Pete Karam – engineering
- Nick Howard – engineering assistant
- Andrew Selluss – engineering assistant

== Charts ==
=== Weekly charts ===
Chart (2002)	Peak position
Australia (ARIA)	6
Austria (Ö3 Austria Top 40)	9
Belgium (Ultratop 50 Flanders)	18
Belgium (Ultratop 50 Wallonia)	28
Denmark (Tracklisten)	15
European Hot 100 Singles (Music & Media)	19
Finland (Suomen virallinen lista)	14
France (SNEP)	27
Germany (GfK)	9
Greece (IFPI)	24
Hungary (Rádiós Top 40)	2
Hungary (Single Top 40)	2
Ireland (IRMA)	15
Italy (FIMI)	7
Netherlands (Dutch Top 40)	8
Netherlands (Single Top 100)	15
New Zealand (Recorded Music NZ)	15
Norway (VG-lista)	11
Poland (Polish Airplay Chart)	2
Romania (Romanian Top 100)	12
Scotland Singles (OCC)	10
Spain (Promusicae)	10
Sweden (Sverigetopplistan)	16
Switzerland (Schweizer Hitparade)	5
UK Singles (OCC)	11
US Bubbling Under Hot 100 (Billboard)	18
US Dance Club Play (Billboard)	1
US Mainstream Top 40 (Billboard)	30

=== Year-end charts ===
Chart (2002)	Position
Australia (ARIA)	75
Austria (Ö3 Austria Top 40)	75
Germany (Media Control)	99
Netherlands (Dutch Top 40)	44
Sweden (Hitlistan)	96
Switzerland (Schweizer Hitparade)	64
UK Singles (OCC)	126
UK Airplay (Music Week)	31

== Certifications ==
Region	Certification	Certified units/sales
Australia (ARIA)	Gold	35,000^{^}
^{^} Shipments figures based on certification alone.

== Release history ==
Release dates and formats for "One Day in Your Life"
Region	Date	Format(s)	Label(s)	Ref.
Germany	February 25, 2002	CD; maxi-CD	Sony Music	
United Kingdom	March 25, 2002	Cassette; maxi-CD	RCA	
Australia	April 1, 2002	Maxi-CD	Sony Music	
France	April 30, 2002	CD	Sony Music	
United States	May 7, 2002	Contemporary hit radio	Daylight; Epic	
Japan	July 10, 2002	Maxi-CD	Sony Music	
France	August 20, 2002	DVD	Sony Music	
United States	August 20, 2002	DVD	Daylight; Epic	
