= Boom (Anastacia song) =

2002 single by Anastacia

Single by Anastacia

from the album The Official Album of the 2002 FIFA World Cup and Freak of Nature (Japanese and Collectors editions)
- Released: March 20, 2002
- Studio: Conway (Los Angeles)
- Length: 3:18
- Label: Epic; Daylight
- Songwriters: Anastacia; Glen Ballard
- Producer: Glen Ballard

Anastacia singles chronology
"One Day in Your Life" (2002)	"Boom" (2002)	"Why'd You Lie to Me" (2002)

"Boom" is a song by American recording artist Anastacia, which served as the official song of the 2002 FIFA World Cup held in South Korea and Japan. Co-written with and produced by Glen Ballard, it was released as a single on March 20, 2002, by Daylight Records and Epic Records. The song was included on The Official Album of the 2002 FIFA World Cup, as well as on the collector's edition of Anastacia's second studio album Freak of Nature (2001). In 2014, MTV Italy declared it the country's favorite FIFA World Cup song.

== Music video ==
Directed by Marcos Siega, the music video for "Boom" was shot in London in 2002. It was later included on her first DVD, The Video Collection. In the beginning of the video, a car is driving along and the radio plays "One Day in Your Life" in the background. Suddenly the car stops and a light flash is seen in the sky. Then the song starts and Anastacia is performing it on a small stage in front of a crowd. During the video, several people get beamed up to this party, some of them being soccer players.

== Track listings ==
- Australia
1. "Boom" (Album Version) – 3:18
2. "Boom" (M*A*S*H Radio Mix) – 3:04
3. "Boom" (Thunderpuss Radio Mix) - 3:20
4. "Boom" (M*A*S*H Master Mix) – 6:23
5. "Boom" (Thunderpuss Club Mix) – 10:52
- Europe
1. "Boom" (Album Version) – 3:18
2. "Boom" (Almighty Radio Edit) – 4:03
3. "Boom" (M*A*S*H Radio Mix) – 3:04
4. "Boom" (Thunderpuss Club Mix) – 10:52
5. "Boom" (Video)
- Austria
1. "Boom" (Album Version) – 3:18
2. "Boom" (Almighty Radio Edit) – 4:03
- Japan
1. "Boom" (Album Version) – 3:18
2. "Paid My Dues" (Album Version) – 3:22

== Charts ==
=== Weekly charts ===
Chart (2002)	Peak position
Australia (ARIA)	23
Austria (Ö3 Austria Top 40)	37
Belgium (Ultratop 50 Flanders)	27
Belgium (Ultratip Bubbling Under Wallonia)	5
Croatia International (HRT)	3
Eurochart Hot 100 (Music & Media)	43
Finland (Suomen virallinen lista)	19
Germany (GfK)	35
Hungary (Rádiós Top 40)	20
Hungary (Single Top 40)	12
Italy (FIMI)	10
Netherlands (Dutch Top 40)	40
Netherlands (Single Top 100)	41
Portugal (AFP)	8
Spain (Promusicae)	14
Sweden (Sverigetopplistan)	7
Switzerland (Schweizer Hitparade)	10

=== Year-end charts ===
Chart (2002)	Position
Sweden (Hitlistan)	86
Switzerland (Schweizer Hitparade)	77

== Release history ==
Release dates and formats for "Boom"
Region	Date	Format	Label	Ref.
Japan	March 20, 2002	CD	Sony Music	
France	June 3, 2002	Maxi-CD	Sony Music	
Germany	June 3, 2002	Maxi-CD	Sony Music	
Australia	June 10, 2002	Maxi-CD	Sony Music	
