= Stalemate (song) =

Single by Ben's Brother featuring Anastacia

from the album Battling Giants
- Released: 26 October 2009
- Recorded: 2009
- Genre: Pop rock
- Length: 4:21
- Label: Island
- Songwriters: Jamie Hartman; Camilla Boler
- Producers: Sacha Skarbek; Ben's Brother

Ben's Brother singles chronology
| "Q & A" (2009) | "Stalemate" (2009) |

Anastacia singles chronology
| "Defeated" (2009) | "Stalemate" (2009) | "Burning Star" (2010) |

Audio
- "Stalemate (feat. Anastacia) (Bonus Track)" on YouTube

"Stalemate" is a song by the English band Ben's Brother from their second studio album, Battling Giants (2009). Released as the album's third single on 26 October 2009, the album version of the song features Joss Stone, while the single version features Anastacia. "Stalemate" had its official premiere on BBC Radio 2 on 21 September 2009.

== Song information ==
The original version of the song, included on Battling Giants, was a collaboration between Ben's Brother and English singer Joss Stone. This version appears on Stone's fourth studio album, Colour Me Free!. However, for the single release, American singer Anastacia replaced her as EMI did not allow Stone's vocals to be featured on the single. Nevertheless, Virgin Records later released a greatest hits compilation album in 2011 titled The Best of Joss Stone 2003–2009 which included the original version of the song.

Anastacia said about the song: "I loved the song from the moment I heard it, and i was thrilled to be asked to add my vocals to it. It's been an amazing opportunity to work with the band. In an interview, Anastacia announced plans to include the version of "Stalemate" with her vocals on her upcoming fifth studio album, meaning chronologically, it will be the first single from it. Jamie Hartman spoke about working with Anastacia: "Anastacia is an amazing singer and a great performer—it was a total pleasure working with her and I'm looking forward to performing with her live!"

Ben's Brother and Anastacia performed the song together on This Morning on 29 October 2009, and at the O_{2} Shepherd's Bush Empire on 2 November 2009. A French-language version of the track was also recorded, also featuring Anastacia, entitled "L"Impasse".

== Music video ==
Hartman said on his blog that the music video for the song would be filmed in London on 22 September 2009. The official video premiered on YouTube on 14 October 2009. The video does not feature Ben's Brother drummer Karl Brazil, who was touring with James Blunt at the time, and instead features session drummer Tom O. Mitchell.

== Track listings ==
- UK digital download
1. "Stalemate" (featuring Anastacia) (Main Version) – 4:21
2. "Stalemate" (featuring Anastacia) (Demo Version) – 4:30
3. "Stalemate" (featuring Anastacia) (Music Video) - 3:56
- UK promotional CD single
1. "Stalemate" (featuring Anastacia) (Radio Edit) – 3:45
2. "Stalemate" (featuring Joss Stone) (Album Version) – 4:21

== Charts ==
| Chart (2009) | Peak position |
|---|---|
| UK Airplay Chart | 72 |

== Release history ==
| Region | Date | Label | Format(s) |
|---|---|---|---|
| United Kingdom | 21 September 2009 | Island | Airplay |
| United Kingdom | 26 October 2009 | Island | CD; digital download |
