= Burning Star (song) =

Single by Natalia and Anastacia
- Released: September 17, 2010
- Recorded: 2010
- Genre: Dance-pop; electropop; pop rock
- Length: 3:33
- Label: Sony Music Entertainment
- Songwriters: Luke Boyd; Micah Otano; Mike Barkulis

Natalia singles chronology
"On the Radio" (2009)	"Burning Star" (2010)

Anastacia singles chronology
"Stalemate" (2009)	"Burning Star" (2010)	"Dream On" (2012)

Audio
- "Burning Star" on YouTube

"Burning Star" is a pop duet recorded by Belgian singer Natalia and American singer Anastacia, used to promote their concert series Natalia Meets Anastacia. The single was produced by Hans Francken and written by Luke Boyd, Micah Otano and Mike Barkulis. The song premiered on 17 September 2010 on Q-Music Radio. It peaked at number 45 on the Swiss Singles Chart in the week of its release.

== Background ==
The single was released on September 17, 2010, as a special gift for Anastacia's birthday. She commented, "The song I did with Natalia called Burning Star airs around September 17th... It is not a bad b-day gift for me! Eh! Eh! Eh! I really like this song! It's a track that's on my next album, so I hope you guys like it!" On September 20, Natalia was a guest on the Q-Music radio show Ornelis en Rogiers Ochtendshow, where she promoted the single. Anastacia joined her by a phone call directly from her home in United States.

== Track listing ==
- Digital download
1. "Burning Star" — 3:33
- German CD single
1. "Burning Star" - 3:33
2. "Burning Star" (Demo) - 3:18

== Charts ==
Chart (2010)	Peak position
Belgian Singles Chart (Flanders)	45

== Release history ==
Date	Country	Label	Format
September 17, 2010	Europe	Sony Music Entertainment	Digital download
September 20, 2010	Scandinavia	Sony Music Entertainment	Digital download
September 24, 2010	Germany	Sony Music Entertainment	CD single
