= Bad Yard Club =

The Bad Yard Club are an ensemble of performers put together by David Morales.

The performers were producers Sly Dunbar and Handel Tucker, keyboardists Eric Kupper and Peter Daou, vocalists CeCe Rogers, Anastacia and Donna Giles, and dancehall/reggae rappers Delta, Papa San, Stanryck and Natural E.

The collaboration nabbed two #1 on the Billboard Hot Dance Music/Club Play chart with "Gimme Luv (Eenie Meenie Miny Mo)" and "The Program" (both featuring Papa San).

== See also ==
- List of Number 1 Dance Hits (United States)
- List of artists who reached number one on the US Dance chart
