= Make A Difference =

Make A Difference (MAD)
- Founded: 2006
- Founders: Jithin John Varghese, Santosh Warrier, Kavin KK, Gloria Benny, Jithin Nedumala, Sujith Varkey
- Type: Non-Profit Society. Registered 80G / 12A
- Purpose: Equitable outcomes for children in shelters
- Location(s): Ahmedabad, Bangalore, Bhopal, Chandigarh, Chennai, Cochin, Coimbatore, Dehradun, Delhi, Guntur, Gwalior, Hyderabad, Lucknow, Mangalore, Mumbai, Mysore, Nagpur, Pune, Trivandrum, Vellore, Vijaywada and Vizag
- Region served: India
- Method: Empowering Children, Changing the Ecosystem, Enabling the Sector
- Website: makeadiff.in

Make A Difference (MAD) is an Indian non-profit organisation, working to ensure better outcomes for children in orphanages and shelters across India. Make A Difference works with nearly 3460 children in 67 shelter homes across 23 cities in India, delivering impact through a fellow-managed volunteering model of 4,255 young participants. It is currently run by Jithin C Nedumala. Make A Difference is registered in Cochin, with a core team based in Bangalore, and operations spread across over 24 Indian cities.

== History ==
Make A Difference was founded by Jithin Nedumala in year 2006 when he was 19 years and Sujith Varkey, together with Gloria Benny, Kavin K K, Santosh Babu and Jithin John Varghese. These six founding members fleshed out the concept of Make A Difference and formed a founding team with friends, peers and members of the community. The NGO had been set up to work with children in need of care and protection and majority of children had undergone adverse childhood experiences (ACE). According to organisation, ACE is an unforgettable, traumatic experience of abuse, neglect or domestic harassment experienced by a person during childhood days and some examples of it are physical abuse, mother treated violently, loss of a loved one, emotional neglect and experiencing a natural calamity and in some cases obesity, alcoholism, depression and early death too. As per organisation's principle only a safe and stable nurturing relationship with a caring adult can help the victim not only to recover from the trauma but thrive in the real world and keeping this in mind they launched the campaign nationally in 23 cities in India where MAD have its volunteers and offices.

The first generation of Make A Difference started with the recruitment of teachers via a presentation made by Jithin, Sujith and Kavin to friends and peers in 2006. Approximately 20 volunteers signed up, and the first chapter of MAD was set up in Cochin, soon after which the organisation formally registered as a non-profit society.

From that point on, Make A Difference grew exponentially. Others to have played seminal roles in the growth and success of Make A Difference have been Samarth Agarwal who served as CEO from 2011 to 2012, Sanjana Kuruvilla who has been on the board since 2008.

Make A Difference remained completely student and volunteer driven until 2010, when the size and complexity of operations drove the need for a full-time workforce to provide strategic and operational support for city teams around the country. This was the same year that Michelle Obama chose Make A Difference to be one of the four non-profits she visited on her trip to India. and the organisation which was not taken as seriously and was struggling to get tie-ups with NGOs until than found itself flooded with lot of calls from individuals and organisations wanting to collaborate with them. Till 2010, MAD had around 800 volunteers who used to teach more than 2,800 children in 10 cities and about 30 students from their five centres in Mumbai met Michelle Obama on November 6, 2010 at the university of Mumbai in Fort during her visit to India that year.

Gloria Benny, one of the founding members, parted ways from the organization later on, to start her own organization.

== Events ==
Back-a-thon is an event organized to create awareness among public. In this, the participants would walk back indicating illiteracy should be removed from a child's life.
Dream Camp is an event organized periodically by the organization. The camp is intended to provide the kids, a stress free environment where they could explore the world, understand and develop confidence towards achieving their dreams. In 2019, MAD Cochin conducted an online campaign through social media with tagline "BrokenIsBeautiful" and offline campaigns being conducted through awareness sessions in city colleges in addition to an on-ground event at David Hall Art Cafe, Fort Kochi in the evening after a cycle rally at Fort Kochi. The campaign is launched as a part of spreading awareness about Adverse Childhood Experiences(ACE).

== Awards and recognition ==
- Make A Difference's work in India was recognised by Michelle Obama who chose Make A Difference as one of the few organisations to visit on her trip to India in 2010.
- Make A Difference was one of four NGO's called to launch the Queen's Young Leaders Trust via the first ever Royal Google+ Hangout in 2014.
- 2014 - eNGO Challenge Award: Winner, Communications and Outreach category.
- 2014 - Website of The Year India: Winner, Charities Category.
