= Anastacia =

American singer (born 1968)

- Anastacia performing in 2023

Background information
- Born: Anastacia Lyn Newkirk; September 17, 1968 (age 58); Chicago, Illinois, U.S.
- Genres: Pop; pop rock; blue-eyed soul; dance-pop
- Occupations: Singer; songwriter
- Works: Discography
- Years active: 1993–present
- Labels: Epic; Mercury; BMG Rights; Sony Music; Universal Music Group
- Spouse: Wayne Newton (m. 2006; div. 2010)
- Website: anastacia.com

Signature
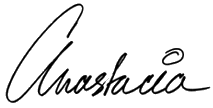

Anastacia Lyn Newkirk (/ˌænəˈsteɪʒə/ AN-ə-STAY-zhə; born September 17, 1968), known mononymously as Anastacia, is an American singer-songwriter who has released nine albums and sold over 50 million records worldwide, and collecting a total of 227 gold and platinum certifications. Thanks to her distinctive tone she has been described as "the little lady with the big voice." Anastacia defines her musical style as "sprock", meaning a fusion of soul, pop, and rock.

Anastacia began her career in 1983 as a dancer. In 1990, she started her music career as a backing vocalist. In 2000, she released "I'm Outta Love", her debut single, which quickly topped charts worldwide and paved the way for her first album, Not That Kind. The following year, she released her second album Freak of Nature. In 2004, she released her album Anastacia, preceded by the single "Left Outside Alone", which remained number one across European charts for 15 weeks. After switching record labels, she returned in 2008 with Heavy Rotation and in 2012 she released It's a Man's World, an album of covers of male rock songs. In 2014, she released Resurrection. Its lead single was "Stupid Little Things". In 2023, she released Our Songs, an album of English-language reinterpretations of German songs.

The majority of her success and dominance was primarily in Europe, Oceania, Asia, Africa, and South America, while in her home country, the United States, she experienced moderate chart success. Her career had been impacted by personal struggles due to serious illnesses, which she claimed "slowed down her career".

== Life and career ==
=== 1968–1982: Early life ===
She was born in Chicago, on September 17, 1968. The second of three children, she grew up in a family of artists: her mother, Diane Hurley, was a Broadway actress of Irish descent, and her father, Robert Newkirk, of German descent, who suffered from bipolar disorder, was a singer who performed in East Coast clubs. Her mother's passion for Russian literature led her to name her daughter Anastacia.

Her childhood had a difficult start: her father abandoned the family and divorced her mother when Anastacia was seven years old. At the age of 13, she discovered she had Crohn's disease. She later gave interviews about it: "My illness has changed me in many ways. It affects everything, from my health to my work to my relationships. What some see as a curse is a gift to me, because it helped me discover who I really am."

At the age of 15, together with her mother, her sister, and her autistic brother, she moved to New York, to the West Side of Manhattan, into a small one-bedroom apartment. Her mother was cast in a Broadway musical but shortly afterward had to abandon her career to care for her son.

At Manhattan's Professional Children's School, Anastacia was a classmate of River Phoenix, Christian Slater, Ricki Lake, and Malcolm-Jamal Warner, who invited her to the prom. She graduated with difficulty due to her dyslexia. Her vocal improvisations and extraordinary voice earned her the nickname "freak of nature," which came first from her mother.

As a child, fascinated by fossils and bones, she developed an interest in archaeology; later, as she grew closer to psychology, she considered a career as a child therapist, and only afterward did she develop a passion for music, which she defined as her "third choice." Before finding success, she worked as an aerobics instructor, then as a secretary in various offices, a hairdresser, a sales assistant in a clothing store, a cashier, a waitress in a restaurant, and an employee in a pastry shop.

=== 1983–1997: Career beginnings ===
In 1983, she began her career as a dancer at the New York club 1018, which she regularly attended with her sister. There, she discovered house music and freestyle dance. In 1990, she started her musical career singing at weddings and working as a backing vocalist for pop star Tiffany on the album New Inside. In 1991, she appeared as a dancer in the music video for My Fallen Angel by Dominican performer Coro. Before Coro's rise to fame, the two had been romantically involved for about a year and a half. Coro proposed marriage but Anastacia declined. Coro later came out as gay. That same year, Steven Spielberg chose Anastacia to sing at his wedding to actress Kate Capshaw. She began performing in nightclubs and casinos with various bands.

Arnold Schwarzenegger hired her to sing at his birthday party, at which he made her perform the same song 12 times: "Whatta Man" by the American groups En Vogue and Salt-n-Pepa. In 1992, she gained further recognition when she appeared on D. L. Hughley's show, performing Get Here by Oleta Adams.

In 1993, together with David Morales, she founded the Bad Yard Club, a collective of producers, musicians, and singers dedicated to creating music. Anastacia recorded the track "Forever Luv" for the album The Program. Record labels hesitated to sign her, partly because they did not know how to market a white woman with a "black" voice, and partly because she refused to conform to producers' demands that she sing pop or hip hop for commercial reasons: "They told me how I should dress, how I should move, what I should think. The reaction of those who met me after hearing my demo was priceless—everyone expected to see a Black girl, but instead there I was: small, White, and wearing glasses. All I wanted was to be myself, to sing with my own voice, and to dress the way I wanted." Producers considered her voice unusual and believed it did not fit into any musical category.

Despite repeated rejections from record labels, Anastacia stayed true to her path. In 1994, she sang backing vocals for Jamie Foxx on his debut album Peep This, and in 1995 for Paula Abdul on her third studio album Head over Heels. From 1997 to 1999, she was a member of the funk/reggae/jazz/R&B cover band The Kraze. In July 1996, she sung in "the Choir of Life" for The Kurt Carr Singers on their record, No One Else The Choir were the Additional Background for the singers, and the album was released in March 1997. Later on was the collaborated with Cuban composer Omar Sosa on the songs Mi Negra, tu bombón and Tienes Un Solo, included in his album Spirit of the Roots. That same year, she found work as a receptionist at celebrity hairstylist José Eber's Beverly Hills salon, but was fired a few months later for being "too outgoing" and having an "overpowering" voice.

Shortly afterward, she signed an exclusive contract to join an all-female music group with three other singers, including Michelle Visage. However, the project failed, and Anastacia was left bound by the restrictive contract.

=== 1998–2000: Breakthrough and Not That Kind ===
In 1998, Anastacia was unemployed after being fired from a beauty salon for "being too loud", and she was disheartened after years of setbacks in the music industry. She was considering a career shift to child psychology. Encouraged by Lisa Braude, who later became her manager, Anastacia auditioned for MTV's talent show The Cut in 1998. She became one of the ten finalists, performing her original song "Not That Kind". Her performance on the show, which was hosted by rapper Lisa "Left Eye" Lopes, garnered interest from record labels. Though she did not win the competition, she impressed prominent artists such as Elton John and Michael Jackson, as well as judges David Foster and Faith Evans. In March 1999, Anastacia signed a record deal with Daylight Records, a custom label under Sony Music Entertainment's Epic Records.

With the support of top American producers and songwriters, Anastacia released her debut album, Not That Kind, on June 13, 2000. The album reached the top ten in eight countries across Europe, the United States, and Asia, and achieved four-times platinum status in Europe and triple platinum in Australia. Her debut single, "I'm Outta Love", became a global hit in 2000, topping the charts in Belgium, Australia, and New Zealand. It peaked at number two in France, Switzerland, Italy, and Ireland, and reached number six in both Germany and the UK. In the United States, it was a minor radio success and a top ten hit on the Hot Dance Club Play chart.

The second single, "Not That Kind", reached number 11 in the UK and entered the top ten in Italy, as well as the top 20 in Switzerland and France. The third single, "Cowboys & Kisses", charted within the top 40 in several European countries. A final promotional single, "Made for Lovin' You", reached number 27 in the UK and number 72 in France. Although her singles had limited success on American mainstream charts, Anastacia won the award for World's Best Selling New Female Pop Artist at the 2001 World Music Awards. By 2006, Not That Kind had sold over five million copies worldwide.

=== 2001–2006: Freak of Nature, breast cancer diagnosis and Anastacia ===
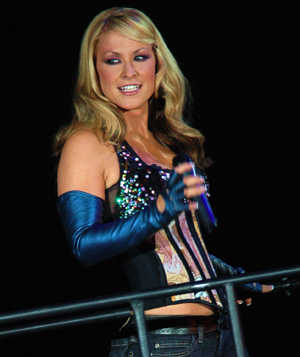
Anastacia performing live in 2005

Anastacia's second album, Freak of Nature, released in November 2001, achieved success in the UK, where it went triple platinum, and was also a hit throughout continental Europe; however, it did not match the success of her international debut. The first single released was "Paid My Dues". The song became an overall hit in 2001, peaking in Denmark, Italy, Norway, and Switzerland, and reaching the top ten in several other mainland European countries. The second single, released in 2002, "One Day in Your Life", reached number eleven in the UK and the top ten in many European countries. The next single, "Why'd You Lie to Me", reached the top thirty in the UK. "You'll Never Be Alone", the fourth single, reached number twenty-eight on the Adult Contemporary chart in the U.S. The album was released in the United States in May 2002. Soon after, she released a double-disc edition featuring two bonus hits, remixes for three of the tracks on the album, and two live tracks taken from a Japan gig performed on September 13, 2002. People reviewed her album, writing, "Anastacia is most successful when she shifts gears on more reflective, folk-tinged pop-rock tunes such as 'Overdue Goodbye' and 'How Come the World Won't Stop,' on which her more nuanced vocals flow naturally."

Anastacia joined Celine Dion, Shakira, Cher, Mary J. Blige, Dixie Chicks, and Stevie Nicks for VH1 Divas Las Vegas in 2002 and also contributed the song "Love Is a Crime" to the Chicago soundtrack. The song peaked at number one on the Hot Dance Club Play chart and enjoyed moderate airplay on the Rhythmic/Dance format. Anastacia sang "Boom", the official song for the 2002 FIFA World Cup held in South Korea and Japan, at the opening ceremony. Freak of Nature sold seven million copies.

In January 2003, Anastacia decided to undergo a breast reduction due to back strain. From a routine mammogram conducted for the surgery, she discovered that she had breast cancer. She immediately had surgery and radiotherapy. Anastacia subsequently established the Anastacia Fund to promote awareness of breast cancer among younger women. She has attributed her health scare as an inspiration for her third album. According to an interview she gave in 2005 on the British music station The Box, her voice lost its power and she became unable to record, so she spent a long time writing and trying to create a sound with which she could finally be happy.

As stated on the Australian talk show Rove in 2004, Anastacia wanted to add more edge to her vocals, as she felt something was missing from her previous work. She brought in rock instruments to create a new atmosphere. She felt that she needed more funkiness and pop but not too much edge. Out of this came a new sound she described as sprock—a combination of soul, pop, and rock. She named the album after herself. Anastacia entered record studios in September 2003 to begin recording the album, working with Glen Ballard, Dallas Austin, and David A. Stewart for release in 2004. On the album, Anastacia also collaborated with P.O.D. lead singer Sonny Sandoval on the socially conscious track "I Do". The first single, released in March, was "Left Outside Alone", which marked a change in direction for Anastacia. It was one of the biggest songs of 2004 in Europe, reaching number one in Austria, Italy, Spain, and Switzerland; number two in Denmark, Germany, Ireland, the Netherlands, and Norway; and number three in the United Kingdom and Hungary. Overall, the song remained at number one on the European Billboard singles chart for 15 weeks. The song also topped the Australian charts, becoming Anastacia's second number one in the country, where it went on to become the second-biggest-selling single of 2004.

Anastacia quickly became her most successful album to date, earning her a third consecutive triple platinum certification in the UK and reaching the top of the national charts in Ireland, the Netherlands, Australia, Greece, Germany, and other countries. Unlike her first two albums, which were released in her homeland of America, Anastacia was not released there, despite being scheduled for release on three occasions. "Left Outside Alone" was released twice but failed to receive heavy airplay. It only gained sporadic airplay on the Adult Contemporary format. Again, it sparked Rhythmic/Dance format airplay, and the dance mix of "Left Outside Alone" peaked at number five on the Hot Dance Club Play chart. After the original version of "Left Outside Alone" failed to catch on due to lukewarm promotion, particularly on radio, the album was postponed and eventually cancelled after the release date of August 30, 2005, passed—only to be released digitally in the US years later. Anastacia released three further internationally successful singles: "Sick and Tired" (which gave her another number one in Spain and another UK top five single), "Welcome to My Truth" (her best-selling hit in Spain), and the ballad "Heavy on My Heart", sales of which went towards the Anastacia Fund, her charitable organization providing research funding for breast cancer.

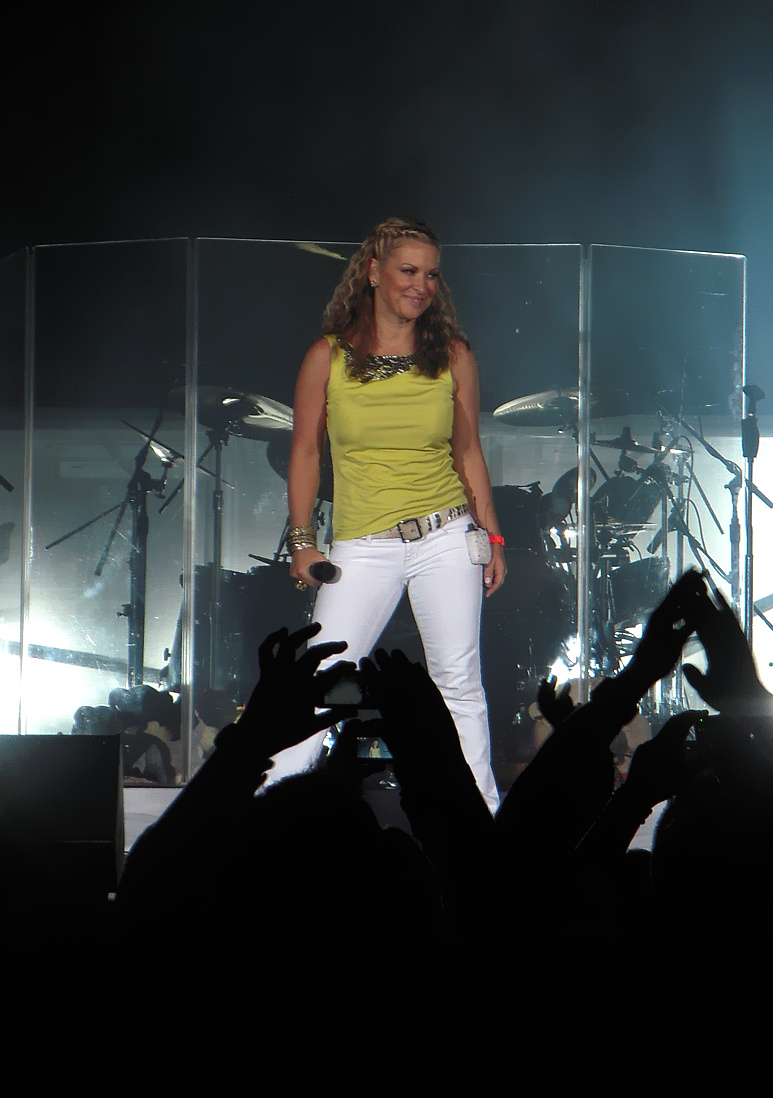
Anastacia performing live in 2005

A limited edition of her album Anastacia was released with a bonus DVD, poster, and slipcase. The DVD included a making-of documentary, footage from her 2002 Europe Promo Tour, and a photo gallery. From September 2004 to August 2005, Anastacia embarked on the Live at Last Tour. In 2005, the tour was renamed the Encore Tour. The tour became the second most popular tour of 2005, behind only U2's Vertigo Tour.

In late 2005, she released her first greatest hits collection, titled Pieces of a Dream. The album spawned the hit singles "Pieces of a Dream", which peaked at number one in Spain, and the duet with Eros Ramazzotti, "I Belong to You (Il Ritmo della Passione)", which was a number one hit in Germany, Hungary, Italy, and Switzerland, and a hit throughout continental Europe. Even though Sony BMG required her to release this collection, Anastacia has said that she is happy it was created, as it serves as a "story book" or summary of the first six years of her career. In 2006, she was recognized for worldwide sales of over 20 million copies of her first three albums, with Anastacia reaching eight million copies sold. Not long after the release of "I Belong to You (Il Ritmo Della Passione)", Anastacia released her first live DVD, Live at Last, on March 27, 2006, in Europe. The DVD features footage from concerts in Berlin and Munich. It includes music videos for her four singles: "Left Outside Alone", "Everything Burns", "Pieces of a Dream", and "I Belong to You (Il Ritmo Della Passione)", as well as five alternative videos—"I Do", "Rearview", "Seasons Change", "Underground Army", and "Time"—and a documentary about the tour.

Soon after the DVD's release, Anastacia took a break from the music industry and began focusing on her growing fashion line with the German brand s.Oliver, launching a clothing collection called "Anastacia by s.Oliver" in 2006, which was sold at 550 stores worldwide. A limited-edition CD named "Welcome to My Style" was also available for free to customers who spent 60 euros or more on the clothing in November. A limited-edition clothing line called "Limited Luxury" was launched on November 2, 2007, which was designed in collaboration with Swarovski.

=== 2007–2013: Heavy Rotation and collaborations ===
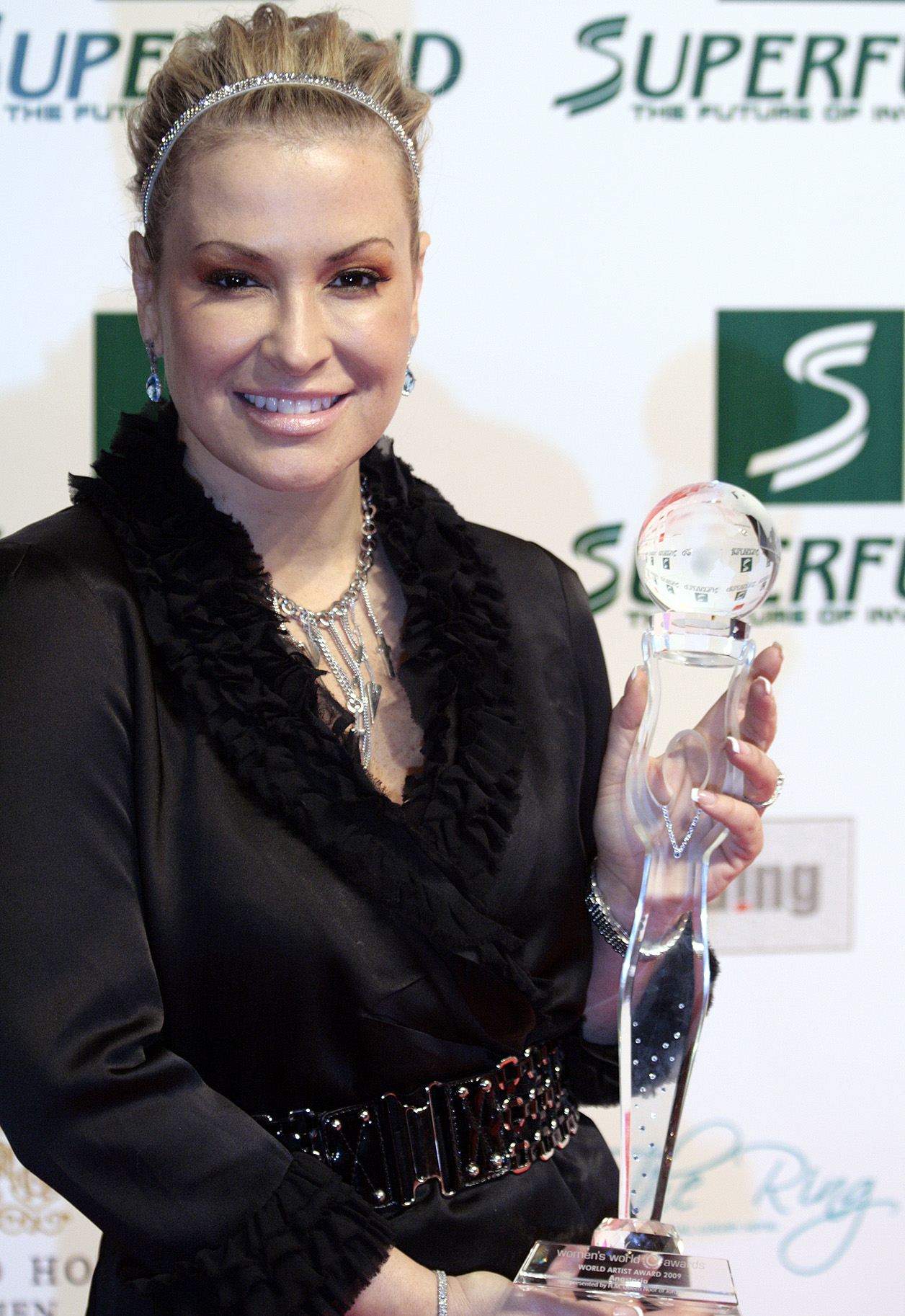
Anastacia, with her World Artist Award, at the 2009 Women's World Awards in Austria

Anastacia performed at the memorial Concert for Diana on July 1, 2007, which would have been Princess Diana's forty-sixth birthday. This was one of her first major appearances since she took a break from the industry. She opened the medley section of the show and sang a rendition of "Superstar", from Andrew Lloyd Webber's Jesus Christ Superstar, with a gospel chorus behind her. In August 2007, a video was posted on the "Anastacia by S. Oliver" website. During the video, when Anastacia was asked about her future plans, she confirmed that she was working on an album as well as the clothing line. A specific release month or title was not mentioned. In November 2007, her biography on the official Anastacia website was updated to say there would be an album in 2008, with a tour to follow. During this period, Anastacia left Sony and moved to Mercury. In an interview for the UK breakfast show This Morning, she said that David Massey's move from Sony to Mercury was key to her own label change because Massey had originally signed her and had been involved in all of her previous albums.

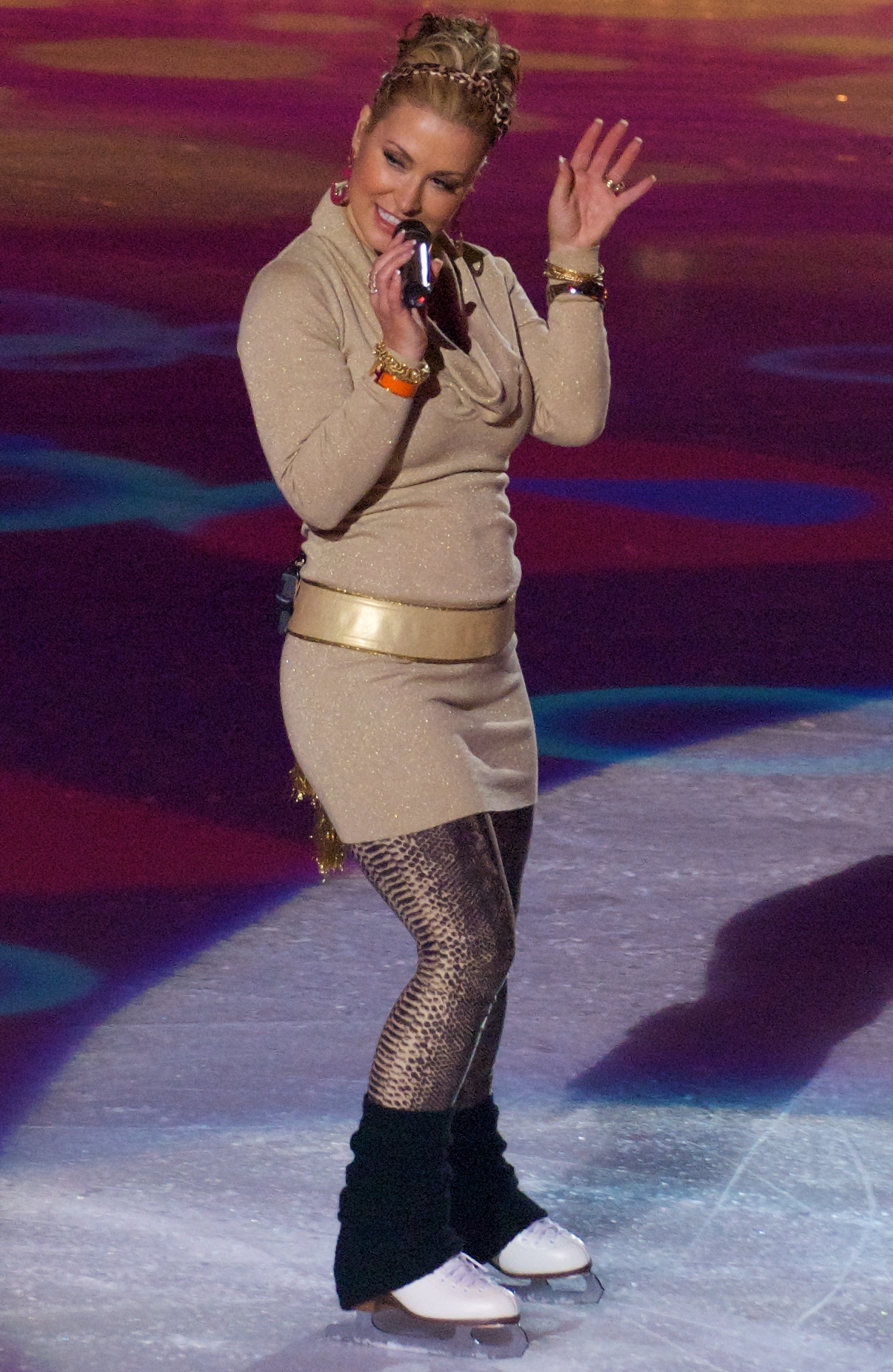
Anastacia performing at the 2010 Art on Ice gala in Switzerland

On July 24, Anastacia announced that her fourth studio album, Heavy Rotation, would be released in Europe and Asia on October 27, 2008 (and elsewhere in 2009). The album featured collaborations with producers Ne-Yo, The Heavyweights, Lester Mendez, J.R. Rotem, and Rodney Jerkins, departing from the pop rock sound of her previous material. The album's first single, "I Can Feel You", began playing in some radio markets on August 25, 2008. The second single from Heavy Rotation was "Absolutely Positively", which later served as a promotional single only. The third official single from the album, "Defeated", was released as a promotional single in Europe without a music video. Her fourth studio album proved less successful; its singles failed to reach the top 40 in her most commercially successful country, the UK. Anastacia remained positive, stating that other artists have faced similar challenges when changing record labels, also attributing the lack of success to the worldwide economic crisis and the label's decision to shift her sound from her own "sprock" style on the previous record to a more "urban" feel. In later years, Anastacia regretted the change in sound, citing personal problems that led to a creative sell-out. Despite the lack of commercial success, the album was ranked number ten on Billboard magazine's online "Readers' Poll: 10 Best Albums of 2008". In 2009, the Women's World Award presented Anastacia with the World Artist Award.

In June 2009, Anastacia began the Heavy Rotation Tour, her second tour throughout Europe to promote her fourth studio album. The tour was funded by the singer herself, rather than her label, and was well received by critics and fans alike. In November and December 2009, Anastacia, Chaka Khan and Lulu headlined the Here Come the Girls, a special Christmas concert tour that visited the United Kingdom only. On December 7, 2009, Anastacia opened the annual Royal Variety Performance with Lulu and Chaka Khan, performing a rendition of Dan Hartman's "Relight My Fire". The tour sold out 24 shows. In October 2009, Anastacia released a collaborative single with British band Ben's Brother entitled "Stalemate", which was included on the band's album Battling Giants. During the winter of 2009, Anastacia once again joined Lulu for the Here Come the Girls Tour with Heather Small replacing Chaka Khan. In March 2010, Anastacia re-entered the recording studio. Around this time, she headlined several shows at Art on Ice in Zürich, the Hallenstadion and Lausanne. Her website stated: "In a unique, groundbreaking combination of Olympic-level figure skating and smash hit pop, the music of Anastacia will soundtrack and seamlessly inspire a performance from some of the world's best figure skaters, perfectly choreographed to complement her hits."

During the summer of 2010, Anastacia became one of the main judges on British talent series Don't Stop Believing, a contest inspired by the musical comedy-drama Glee. During promotion for the reality show, the singer stated that she had left Mercury Records and was without a label. Following "Stalemate", Anastacia released "Safety", a duet with Russian singer Dima Bilan, recorded in Los Angeles in May 2010. The song was performed live for the first time at the Muz-TV Music Awards Moscow in June 2010 and was released as a single in Russia in August 2010. On August 13, Anastacia announced that she would join Belgian singer Natalia Druyts for a joint tour, Natalia Meets Anastacia, for six arena shows performed at the Sportpaleis, Belgium. On August 17, Natalia and Anastacia recorded a collaborative single, "Burning Star", which was released on September 17, 2010, to promote the concert series.

On November 13, Anastacia became the first international singer to perform a concert in Northern Cyprus, which was occupied by Turkish forces. In February 2011, Anastacia was a guest at the Gigi D'Alessio concert at Radio City Music Hall in New York, performing as an opening act. On November 11, 2011, she performed in Madrid for the SAP Sapphire Conference. In June 2012, Anastacia was confirmed as a guest judge for the ninth series of The X Factor UK at the Glasgow auditions for Kelly Rowland alongside judges Louis Walsh, Gary Barlow and Tulisa Contostavlos. Her appearance on the show was highly praised, with commentators noting she had "great chemistry" with the others and had greatly impressed the producers, causing speculation that the singer would become the new fourth judge. However, it was later revealed that she had to reject the judging offer due to contractual agreements for the Night of the Proms European winter tour as well as the release of her independent cover album.

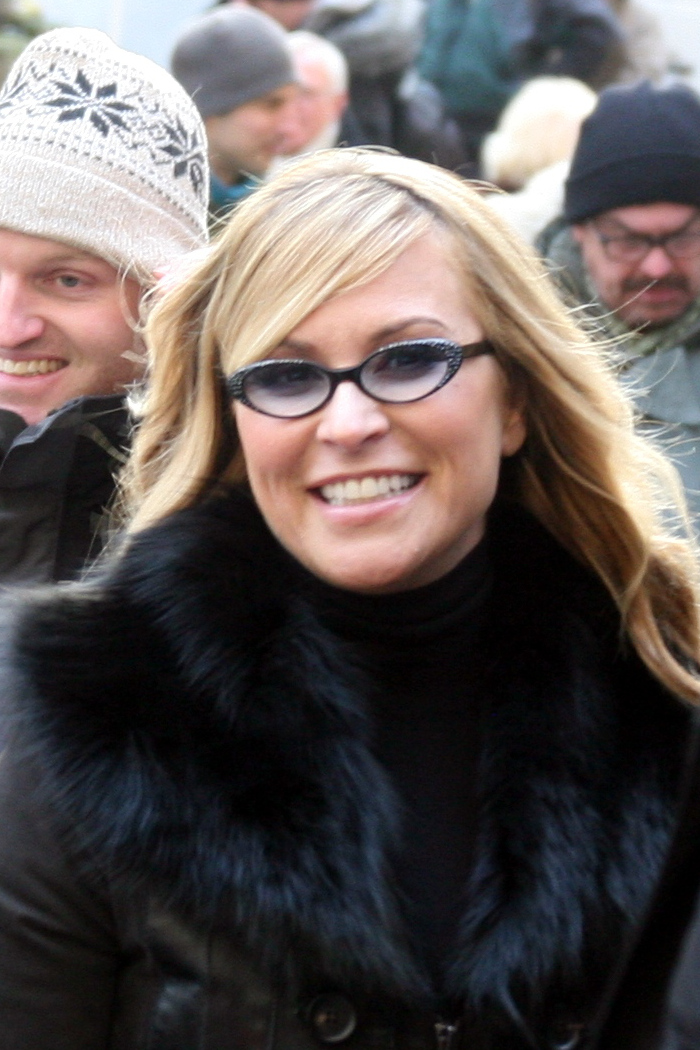
Anastacia in Prague in 2012

During summer 2012, Anastacia toured throughout Europe. In July 2012, Anastacia announced on her Twitter page and Facebook fan page the release of a commercial single for the car company Škoda Auto. She performed the song "What Can We Do (Deeper Love)" for the first time on 10 July at the Jazz Festival in Montreux, Switzerland. She later released the video for the song through her social media pages. On 17 September, it was announced that Anastacia had signed with the "BMG Masters Model" service of BMG Rights Management, along with the service's primary German-based distributing partner, Rough Trade Distribution. Global distribution is expected to be achieved via a range of partnering labels and distribution services. The deal included the release of her next two albums, It's a Man's World, a collection of covers of songs by male rock artists released on 9 November 2012, followed by an album of original material.

Throughout November and December 2012, Anastacia took part in the annual Night of the Proms, a series of concerts held in Belgium, the Netherlands, and Germany which combine classical music with famous pop songs. On 2 February 2013, Anastacia tweeted that she would start writing for her next studio album of new material the following week. In 2012, Anastacia starred as a fictionalized version of herself in the film All You Can Dream, directed by Valerio Zanoli. The film follows a young girl who is guided by her guardian angel and favourite singer Anastacia. The film aimed to end bullying and was part of a project, Let's Make a Difference.

On 27 February 2013, Anastacia announced that she had cancelled her European tour because she was diagnosed with breast cancer for the second time and was undergoing treatment. Due to her decade-long charitable efforts in breast cancer awareness, Anastacia became only the second woman to be presented with the Humanitarian Award at the GQ Men of the Year Awards in 2013.

=== 2014–2020: Resurrection, Ultimate Collection and Evolution ===
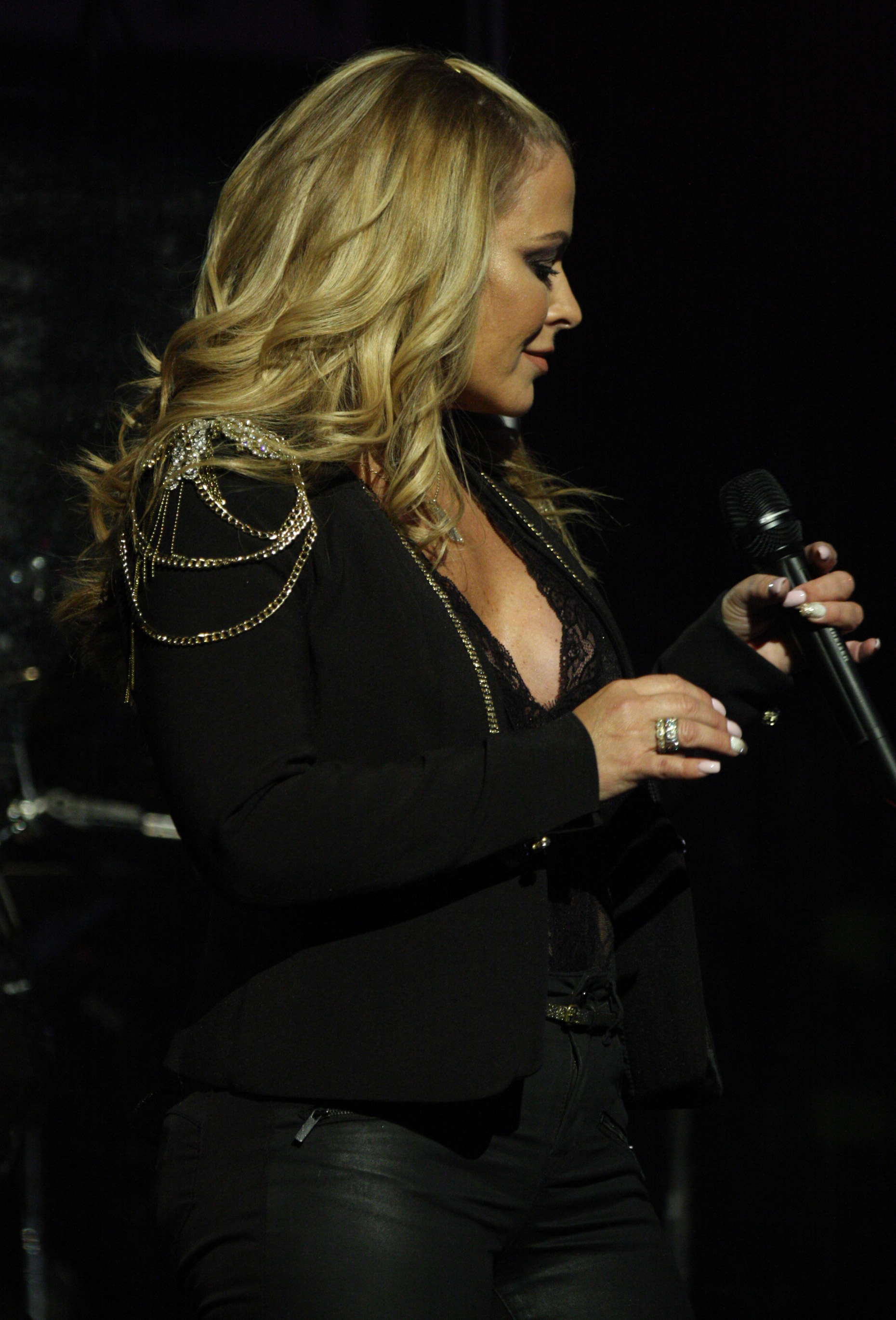
Anastacia performing on The Resurrection Tour in Sydney, Australia (2015)

The album, entitled Resurrection, was released in May 2014 and was met with both critical and commercial success, giving the singer her sixth top ten Italian album and fifth top ten UK album. It also reached the top five of the Swiss and German charts and the top ten of the Dutch charts. Reviews were overwhelmingly positive, acknowledging a return to form for the singer as well as a creative resurgence. The lead single "Stupid Little Things" was released on 4 April 2014. The single was moderately successful, reaching the top ten in Belgium and the top 20 in Italy. It was quickly met with a positive reaction from music critics, with MTV's Brad Stern naming it one of the "5 Must-Hear Pop Songs of the Week!" and calling it a "return to form" for the "pop princess" and proof that Anastacia is a true survivor, after her second battle with breast cancer. Anastacia was given the German Radio Regenbogen Award for Charity and Entertainment in April 2014.

In June 2014, Anastacia announced that due to a hernia procedure she would be unable to promote the album for several weeks. After returning to her promotional tour, Anastacia played numerous festivals throughout Europe, including headlining Manchester Pride, which was heavily praised. She was also named as one of the judges on the German talent show Rising Star. In November 2014, Anastacia began her Resurrection Tour, her first tour to include Australia. The tour ended in September 2015 after 80 shows and was well received by fans and critics. During this period, it was also announced that Anastacia had re-signed with her original label and that a compilation album would be released. In 2015, Anastacia released a jewellery collection with Tat 2 Designs, which consisted of bracelets, earrings, and necklaces designed by Anastacia and Briana Erin. Anastacia's Ultimate Collection was released in November 2015 and peaked in the top ten of the UK charts, giving the singer her sixth top ten album in Britain. During the same month, Anastacia attended The Children For Peace Gala at Spazio Novecento in Rome, where she received the special artist award. She then embarked on the Ultimate Collection Tour to promote the album.

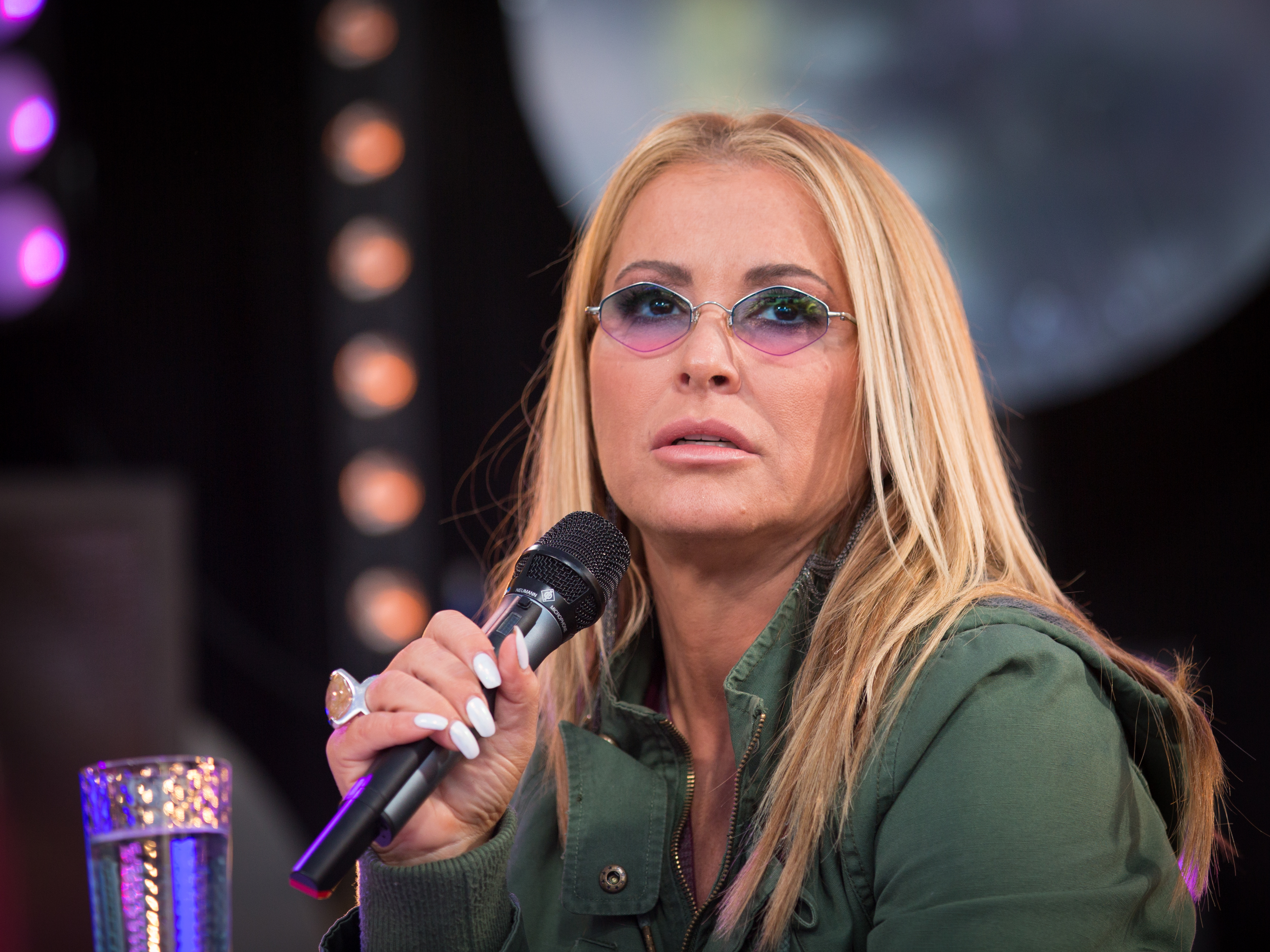
Anastacia at the SWR3 New Pop Festival (2017)

In August 2016, Anastacia became a contestant on the fourteenth series of the British television dance contest Strictly Come Dancing, broadcast on BBC One. Partnered with dancer Brendan Cole, the couple were voted in the bottom two to compete in the dance-off in the show's second week. A doctor ruled Anastacia unable to compete due to an injury sustained during the previous day's performance; instead, the result was decided by saving the competitor with the higher number of audience votes, resulting in Melvin Odoom and his professional partner Janette Manrara's elimination. The decision was controversial, resulting in complaints, and judge Bruno Tonioli reportedly threatened to quit. She was eliminated from the show in its sixth week, finishing in tenth place. On February 17, 2016, Women's Wear Daily announced that Anastacia teamed up with Blumarine for an eyewear collection. The "Blumarine Eyewear by Anastacia" capsule collection included three styles of sunglasses and two optical frames and was released in April 2016.

In June 2017, she supported Lionel Richie during some UK dates of his All the Hits Tour. The following July, she released the single "Caught in the Middle", which preceded her seventh studio album, Evolution, released in September 2017. After the album's success, she embarked on the Evolution Tour to promote it. In 2018, Anastacia appeared on Ballando con le stelle, the Italian version of Dancing with the Stars, in a special one-off performance. In January 2019, it was announced that Anastacia would portray Killer Queen in the 2019 Dutch run of the We Will Rock You musical. She performed in Amsterdam and The Hague from December 6, 2019, to January 13, 2020, covering various Queen songs.

=== 2021–2022: The Masked Singer and touring ===
Anastacia was revealed as the winner of the third season of The Masked Singer Australia in October 2021, competing as the "Vampire" mask, making her the first American singer to win the show. Singing cover songs on The Masked Singer reminded Anastacia of her early career when she was trying to establish herself as an artist. When speaking to Australian media outlets in 2021, she suggested that Evolution (2017) could be her last album and she might only release singles in the future. However, in October 2022, she announced that she was preparing to release her eighth studio album in 2023.

In November 2021, Anastacia announced a concert tour, I'm Outta Lockdown – The 22nd Anniversary European Tour in 2022. The tour was initially planned for the 20th anniversary of the release of her debut single "I'm Outta Love" in 2020, but was delayed due to the COVID-19 pandemic. The tour ran from September to February 2023, and was well received, with the Newcastle World writing: "There's no denying that Anastacia is a true performer; she knows how to work a crowd (she made hilarious commentary throughout the whole show) and has the type of stage presence that most performers would kill to have. However, what stuck with me the most wasn't actually her vocal and performing talents, but rather her personality. As I mentioned earlier, she communicated with the crowd in a hilarious yet lovely manner – thanking everyone for their support throughout, making jokes and also sending positive messages surrounding mental health and kindness."

On February 7, 2022, Anastacia released the single "American Night", the theme song to the 2021 film American Night, starring Jonathan Rhys Meyers and Paz Vega; Anastacia made a cameo appearance in the film. The official music video was released the same day. In November 2022, Anastacia released a capsule collection called "Not That Kind of Bag Collection", with Italian brand Poshead. She designed three exclusive bags named after her songs: Not That Kind, Freak of Nature and Paid My Dues.

=== 2023–2024: Our Songs ===
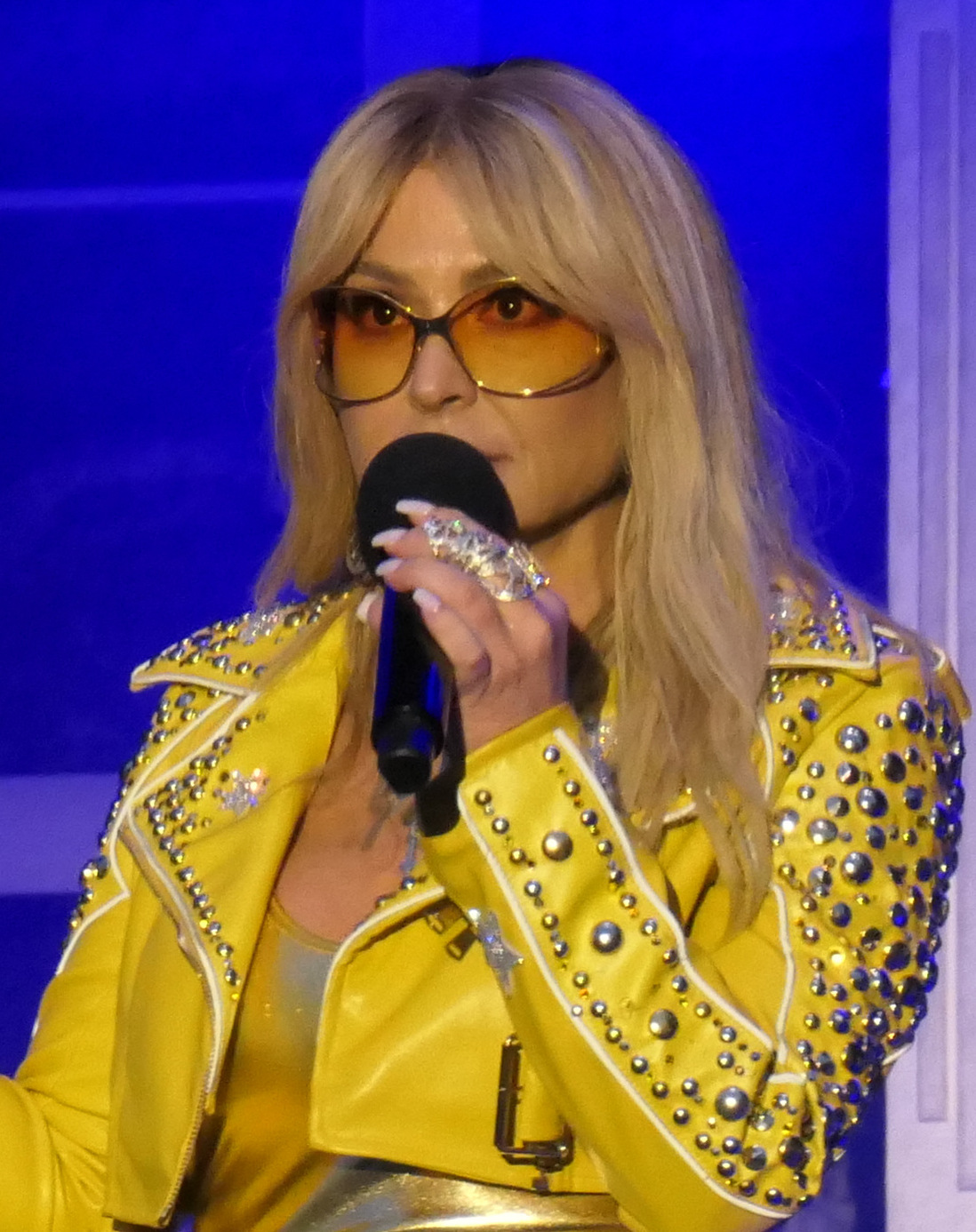
Anastacia performing in 2025

On April 28, 2023, Anastacia released a single titled "Best Days", a loosely translated cover of "Tage Wie Diese (Days Like These)" by German punk rock band Die Toten Hosen. She also announced that her eighth studio album is called Our Songs. In the United Kingdom, "Best Days" debuted at number 70 on the Singles Downloads Chart Top 100 on May 5, 2023. On May 19, 2023, Anastacia was a guest performer as Kangaroo on the French series Mask Singer, where she sang "Don't Let the Sun Go Down on Me" by Elton John. The second single, a cover of Reamonn's "Supergirl", was released on July 14, 2023.

On September 21, 2023, Anastacia announced that she is joining German singer Peter Maffay on his Farewell Tour in 2024. She released the video of their duet "Just You" on the same day; the song was originally performed by Maffay as "So bist du" in 1979. On September 22, 2023, Anastacia released Our Songs. The album received a Gold certification in Germany, and a special Gold Deluxe Edition of Our Songs was released on June 21, 2024.

In December 2023, she performed at Night of the Proms in Germany, 11 years after her previous appearance at the event. In addition to singing her own songs, Anastacia performed "Broken Strings" with English singer James Morrison.

=== 2025–present: #NTK25 Live In Concert albums ===
Anastacia performing on her NTK 26 tour in September 2026

Her live album and DVD, "#NTK25 - Live in Concert" was released By Stars by Edel on January 16, 2026. In 2026, she appeared as a guest judge on Australian Idol and RuPaul's Drag Race: UK vs. the World.

Her album, Symphonic Revolution, is set to be released in November 2026. It is a compilation of her biggest hits with an orchestra.

== Philanthropy ==
Anastacia has supported many nonprofit organizations and attended various charity events such as Life Ball in 2006 (Europe's largest annual AIDS charity event), Make a Difference, and Challenge for the Children. Anastacia was one of the fifteen artists to record their take on a Disney song on the compilation album Disneymania (2002). She recorded "Someday My Prince Will Come" from Snow White and the Seven Dwarfs. It is also included on the Collector's Edition of her second album, Freak of Nature. Anastacia performed a cover of AC/DC's "You Shook Me All Night Long" with Celine Dion at the VH1 Divas Las Vegas, a concert to benefit The VH1 Save The Music Foundation. The song was featured on the Divas Las Vegas live album.

In 2003, Anastacia performed at the charity event 46664, organized by Nelson Mandela to raise awareness of AIDS. She sang with Beyoncé, U2, and Queen, and also contributed to the song "Amandla", recording the song and providing some of the lyrics. Annie Lennox joined forces with Anastacia and 22 other female artists to raise awareness of the transmission of HIV to unborn children in West Africa, Central Africa, Southern Africa, and Southeast Africa. The single "Sing" was released on World AIDS Day, 1 December 2007, in conjunction with Annie Lennox's appearance at the Nelson Mandela 46664 concert in South Africa.

After being diagnosed with cancer, Anastacia created "The Anastacia Fund" in partnership with Estée Lauder. The organisation helps raise awareness about breast cancer and the importance of mammograms for women 35 and under. She has expressed concerns that women under 40 are generally not targeted for screenings except in cases with a family history of breast cancer, and she wants to help make a difference after a mammogram helped save her own life. Anastacia began selling her stage clothing on eBay, donating a portion to the Breast Cancer Research Foundation. The auctions were hosted by an eBay Trading Assistant and Certified Business Consultant. New listings began every Friday for six months. In 2008, she performed at the "Pink Ribbon Gala" in Stockholm along with nine female artists who have fought breast cancer. She also appeared on "Divas II", a benefit concert along with many other female artists, and performed at the ChildLine Concert in Dublin, Ireland.

== Personal life ==
Anastacia has lived in Los Angeles, Florida and currently resides in Denver, Colorado.

Over the course of her life, Anastacia has suffered several health problems, including being diagnosed with Crohn's disease, suffering breast cancer twice, and the heart condition supraventricular tachycardia. In recognition of her decade-long charitable efforts in breast cancer awareness, she was presented with the Humanitarian Award at the GQ Men of the Year Awards in 2013.

Anastacia was in a relationship with actor Shawn Woods from 1994 to 2001, and dated the German DJ Patrice Bouédibéla.

She became engaged to her bodyguard Wayne Newton in September 2006. The couple married in Huatulco, Mexico, on April 21, 2007. She became a stepmother to his two children from a previous relationship. In April 2010, it was confirmed that the two had filed a petition for divorce, citing irreconcilable differences. She wrote the song "Pendulum" about her divorce, saying: "It's totally about the loss of my marriage, but it's a beautiful song. I think I lost a bit of myself for a while. My career got so busy I'd be thinking: 'Who the hell am I?'"

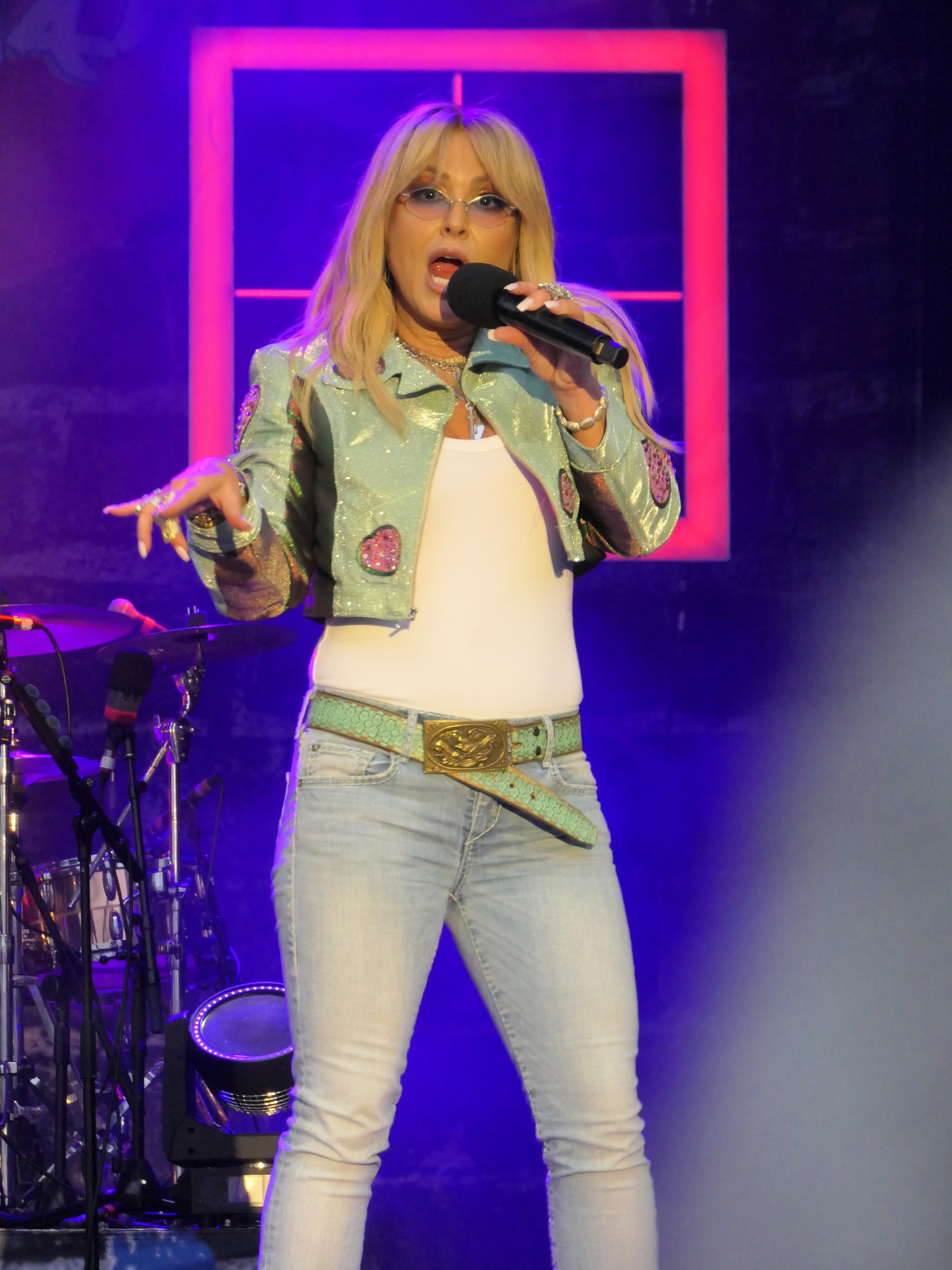
Anastacia on her NTK 2025 tour at the Hohentwiel Festival in Singen, Germany

== Public image ==
Known for her small stature and powerful voice, she has been nicknamed the "little lady with the big voice". She is known for wearing trademark darkly tinted corrective spectacles.

She has appeared in television commercials for Mastercard's "Something for the Fans" campaign, Škoda, Honda, and Dr Pepper, in which she sang "Be You" with Cyndi Lauper. She has graced the covers of numerous international magazines, including Ecuador's Cosmopolitan; Germany's Maxim; Bulgaria's Eva; Italy's Grazia; the UK's Fault, Fabulous and Love Sunday; and the Netherlands' Veronica. She has also appeared in pictorials for the US's FHM and Playboy and the UK's You. Along with a pictorial for FHM magazine, she was placed at number 19 on their list of The 20 Hottest Women In Music 2002.

Anastacia is well known for writing her own songs, which are often autobiographical and uplifting, saying:

Every song I write has some message of empowerment. In this day and age artists focus on the production of a song or the arrangement. But for me, my music is about my words, my lyrics – I want my songs to speak to people, to help them through bad times and to let them know anything is possible. You can survive, you can evolve. Just look at me.

She wrote her single "Paid My Dues" about her early career in the music industry. In an interview with Billboard, she said: "For years, I had been told my voice was too black, that I should get contacts and ditch the glasses, that I was too in-your-face, the list goes on. Now, these are the very things that people respond to."

List of fashion and beauty lines by Anastacia
Year	Title	Brand	Notes
2006–2010	"Anastacia by s.Oliver"	s.Oliver	Clothing line
2016	"The Blumarine Eyewear by Anastacia"	Blumarine	Eyewear collection
2017	"Music Loves Fashion"	Aldi	Clothing collection
2022	"Not That Kind of Bag Collection"	Poshead	Handbag collection

== Discography ==
Studio albums

- Not That Kind (2000)
- Freak of Nature (2001)
- Anastacia (2004)
- Heavy Rotation (2008)
- It's a Man's World (2012)
- Resurrection (2014)
- Evolution (2017)
- Our Songs (2023)
- Symphonic Revolution (2027)

== Filmography ==
=== As herself ===
Film
Year	Title	Role	Notes
2012	All You Can Dream	Anastacia	Feature film
2021	American Night	Herself	Cameo

Television
Year	Title	Role	Notes
1998	The Cut	Contestant	
2001	Ally McBeal	Herself	Episodes: "The Getaway" and "Queen Bee"
2002	I Love the '80s	Herself	TV Series documentary
2002	2002 MLB All-Star Game	National Anthem Performer	Television special
2002	VH1 Divas Las Vegas	Performer	Television special
2002	Gold, Gold, Gold	Herself	Television film (Germany)
2003	What More Can I Give	Anastacia	Television special
2004	Eurojunior	Musical guest	Episode: "Episode dated 6 July 2004"
2005	Domino Day	Guest star	Episode: "Domino Day 2005"
2005	MTV A Cut	Host & Judge	Winners: Youth of Britain
2008	Star Academy	Guest star	French television series
2009	The X Factor Italy	Performer/Guest Judge	Episode: "Episode 2.9"
2009	Panelák	Herself	Episode: "Mr. Nanuk"
2010	EuroVoice Music Contest 2010	Special guest	
2010	Don't Stop Believing	Judge	
2012	The X Factor	Herself	Episodes: "Auditions 6", "Auditions 3"
2014	The Voice	Herself	Episode: "La finale"
2015, 2016	Strictly Come Dancing	Various roles	Musical guest on season 13 Contestant on season 14
2018	Ballando con le Stelle	Herself	Dancer; Episode: "Terza puntata"
2021	The Masked Singer Australia	Vampire	Contestant and winner on season 3
2023	Mask Singer	Kangaroo	Guest performer; Episode: "Episode 5.6"
2024	Kiwis große martin.partynacht	Music Act	Germany; English title: Kiwi's Big Party Night
2026	RuPaul's Drag Race: UK vs. the World	Herself	Guest Judge (Series 3)
2026	Australian Idol	Herself	Guest Judge; Episode: "Auditions 7"

== Tours ==
Headlining

- Live at Last Tour (2004–05)
- Heavy Rotation Tour (2009)
- Resurrection Tour (2014–15)
- Ultimate Collection Tour (2016–17)
- Evolution Tour (2018)
- I'm Outta Lockdown: 22nd Anniversary Tour (2022–23)
- Not That Kind: 25th Anniversary Tour (2025-2026)

Co-headlining

- Here Come the Girls (with Chaka Khan, Heather Small and Lulu) (2009, 2010)
- Art on Ice (with David Garrett and Seven) (2010)
- Natalia Meets Anastacia (with Natalia) (2011)
- Night of the Proms (with Naturally 7) (2012)
- Vi Elsker (with Craig David, La Bouche and 2 Unlimited) (2024)

Promotional

- US Club Tour (1999–2000)
- Europe Promo Tour (2000)
- Australian Promo Tour (2000, 2002)

Opening act

- Rocket Man: Greatest Hits Live (for Elton John) (2009)
- All the Hits, All Night Long Tour (for Lionel Richie) (2018)
- We Love Rock 'n' Roll: Farewell Tour (for Peter Maffay) (2024)

== See also ==
- Artists with the most number-one European singles
- List of number-one dance hits (United States)
- List of artists who reached number one on the U.S. dance chart
