= You'll Never Be Alone =

Single by Anastacia

from the album Freak of Nature
- B-side: "You Shook Me All Night Long" (live)
- Released: November 18, 2002
- Studio: Homesite 13 (Novato, California); Right Track (New York City); Ocean Way (Hollywood, California)
- Length: 4:21 (European version); 4:38 (US version); 3:53 (radio edit)
- Label: Epic; Daylight
- Songwriters: Anastacia; Louis Biancaniello; Sam Watters
- Producers: Louis Biancaniello; Sam Watters

Anastacia singles chronology
"Why'd You Lie to Me" (2002)	"You'll Never Be Alone" (2002)	"Love Is a Crime" (2003)

Music video
- "You'll Never Be Alone" on YouTube

"You'll Never Be Alone" is a song by American recording artist Anastacia from her second studio album, Freak of Nature (2001). Co-written with and produced by Louis Biancaniello and Sam Watters, the ballad was released in Europe as the album's fifth and final single in November 2002. In the United States, it appeared on the Billboard Adult Contemporary chart, peaking at number 28.

== Recording and production ==
"You'll Never Be Alone" was written by Anastacia and co-written and produced by Louis Biancaniello and Sam Watters. It was recorded at Homesite 13 in Novato, California, Ocean Way Recording in Los Angeles, and Right Track Recording in New York City.

== Critical reception ==
Jose F. Promis wrote for AllMusic that "When Anastacia slows down the tempo for the ballads (some organic and acoustic, some bordering on power ballads), she succeeds by utilizing her strong vocal chops without venturing into vocal histrionics." Louis Pattison from NME wrote that the song "drips like Celine Dion dipped in honey. Yahoo! Music's James Salmon called it "an insipid halt", while Slant Magazine's Sal Cinquemani named it "syrupy".

== Music video ==
Shot in Los Angeles, the music video for "You'll Never Be Alone" was Anastacia's second to be directed by Mike Lipscombe, the first being "Why'd You Lie to Me". The video was later included on her first music DVD The Video Collection. When the video begins, Anastacia is standing in front of the camera singing the song. As the camera leaves, she and her boyfriend are shown cuddling in front of her boyfriend's house. After saying goodbye, she drives away. On her way presumably home, gray wolves are crossing the road, causing the car to get off the road. After hitting a tree, her "spirit leaves her body" to warn her boyfriend that she has been in an accident. Back at the boyfriend's house, his dog senses the spirit's presence and he wakes up his master. In the meantime, Anastacia's spirit guides them to the place where the accident happened, without him knowing the spirit is there. Together they arrive at the car, when the spirit goes back into the real body and the boyfriend carries her back to the road. In the end, Anastacia awakens in her boyfriend's arms as he carries her into the ambulance.

== Track listings ==
- United Kingdom
1. "You'll Never Be Alone" (Album Version) – 4:21
2. "You Shook Me All Night Long" (Live with Celine Dion) – 3:51
3. "Lord Is Blessing Me" (Live) – 2:55
4. "You'll Never Be Alone" (Video)
- Austria
1. "You'll Never Be Alone" (Album Version) – 4:21
2. "You Shook Me All Night Long" (Live with Celine Dion) – 3:51
- Europe
1. "You'll Never Be Alone" (Album Version) – 4:21
2. "You Shook Me All Night Long" (Live with Celine Dion) – 3:51
3. "Lord Is Blessing Me" (Live) – 2:55
4. "Late Last Night" – 4:26
5. "You'll Never Be Alone" (Video)

== Charts ==
Chart (2002–2003)	Peak position
Austria (Ö3 Austria Top 40)	42
Belgium (Ultratop 50 Flanders)	44
Belgium (Ultratip Bubbling Under Wallonia)	9
Eurochart Hot 100 (Music & Media)	60
Germany (GfK)	56
Italy (FIMI)	28
Netherlands (Dutch Top 40 Tipparade)	2
Netherlands (Single Top 100)	54
Portugal (AFP)	6
Scotland Singles (OCC)	31
Sweden (Sverigetopplistan)	34
Switzerland (Schweizer Hitparade)	39
UK Singles (OCC)	31
US Adult Contemporary (Billboard)	28

== Release history ==
Release dates and formats for "You'll Never Be Alone"
Region	Date	Format(s)	Label(s)	Ref.
Germany	November 18, 2002	Maxi CD	Sony Music	
United Kingdom	November 25, 2002	Maxi CD	RCA	
Denmark	December 9, 2002	CD	Sony Music	
