= Why'd You Lie to Me =

2002 single by Anastacia

Single by Anastacia

from the album Freak of Nature
- B-side: "Bad Girls" (live); "Boom"
- Released: September 9, 2002
- Studio: The Dream Factory (New York City); Cove City Sound (Glen Cove, New York); Encore (Burbank, California)
- Length: 3:43
- Label: Epic; Daylight
- Songwriters: Anastacia; Damon Sharpe; Greg Lawson; Trey Parker; Damon Butler; Canela Cox
- Producer: Ric Wake

Anastacia singles chronology
"Boom" (2002)	"Why'd You Lie to Me" (2002)	"You'll Never Be Alone" (2002)

Music video
- "Why'd You Lie to Me" on YouTube

"Why'd You Lie to Me" is a song by American singer Anastacia from her second studio album, Freak of Nature (2001). Written by Anastacia, Damon Sharpe, Greg Lawson, Trey Parker, Damon Butler, and Canela Cox, the song first appeared on the US edition of Anastacia's debut album Not That Kind in March 2001. It was released as the third single from Freak of Nature on September 9, 2002, by Daylight Records and Epic Records. In the United States, the track served as the album's second single.

== Critical reception ==
With a positive review, James Salmon from Yahoo! Music said: "Just when you think she's about to grind to an insipid halt, she snaps out of it with good old fashioned pop rants against the male species ('Why'd You Lie To Me')." Jose Promis from Allmusic compared it to a "Destiny's Child-sounding".

== Music video ==
Directed by Mike Lipscombe and produced by Michael J. Pierce, the music video for "Why'd You Lie to Me" was shot at Raleigh Studios in Los Angeles on July 6–7, 2002. It was later included on Anastacia's first music DVD, The Video Collection. The video is notable for being the first to show the singer without her trademark glasses. Choreography was done by Tina Landon. In June 2010, Anastacia confirmed in her last tour she films a new alternative video of this single and a new music video of "I Thought I Told You That".

== Track listings ==
UK CD1

1. "Why'd You Lie to Me" (album version)
2. "Why'd You Lie to Me" (M*A*S*H master mix)
3. "Bad Girls" (live at the Brits 2002 with Jamiroquai)
4. "Why'd You Lie to Me" (video)

UK CD2

1. "Why'd You Lie to Me" (album version)
2. "Why'd You Lie to Me" (Kardinal Beats mix)
3. "Boom" (album version)
4. "Boom" (video)

UK cassette single

1. "Why'd You Lie to Me" (album version)
2. "Why'd You Lie to Me" (NDB Nu Soul mix)
3. "Why'd You Lie to Me" (M*A*S*H master mix)

European CD single

1. "Why'd You Lie to Me" (album version) – 3:43
2. "Why'd You Lie to Me" (M*A*S*H master mix) – 7:03

European maxi-CD single

1. "Why'd You Lie to Me" (album version) – 3:43
2. "Why'd You Lie to Me" (M*A*S*H master mix) – 7:03
3. "Why'd You Lie to Me" (M*A*S*H deep club) – 8:14
4. "Why'd You Lie to Me" (Kardinal Beats mix) – 4:31
5. "Why'd You Lie to Me" (video)

Australian CD single

1. "Why'd You Lie to Me" (album version) – 4:02
2. "Why'd You Lie to Me" (M*A*S*H remix radio edit) – 3:40
3. "Why'd You Lie to Me" (Kardinal Beats mix) – 4:31
4. "Bad Girls" (live at the Brits 2002 with Jamiroquai) – 4:13

== Charts ==
Chart (2002–2003)	Peak position
Australia (ARIA)	66
Austria (Ö3 Austria Top 40)	37
Belgium (Ultratip Bubbling Under Flanders)	2
Belgium (Ultratip Bubbling Under Wallonia)	8
Croatia International (HRT)	7
Eurochart Hot 100 (Music & Media)	56
Finland (Suomen virallinen lista)	19
Germany (GfK)	55
Hungary (Rádiós Top 40)	34
Hungary (Single Top 40)	18
Ireland (IRMA)	35
Italy (FIMI)	31
Netherlands (Dutch Top 40)	13
Netherlands (Single Top 100)	48
Romania (Romanian Top 100)	12
Scotland Singles (Official Charts)	30
Sweden (Sverigetopplistan)	25
Switzerland (Schweizer Hitparade)	39
UK Singles (Official Charts)	25

== Release history ==
Release dates and formats for "Why'd You Lie to Me"
Region	Date	Format(s)	Label(s)	Ref.
Germany	September 9, 2002	12-inch vinyl; CD; maxi CD	Sony Music	
United Kingdom	September 9, 2002	Cassette; maxi CD	RCA	
United States	September 23, 2002	Adult contemporary radio	Daylight; Epic	
Australia	September 30, 2002	Maxi CD	Sony Music	

== Cover versions and media appearances ==
The song was covered by Operación Triunfo series six finalist Noelia. She sang the song live on May 27, 2008, when the gala show took place. She was nominated by the panel for eviction, but was saved by the teachers. The song is also used as the fanfare to introduce "The Lie of the Day" segment on The Laura Ingraham Radio Show.
