= Ultimate Collection Tour =

2016–17 concert tour by Anastacia

- Tour by Anastacia
- Promotional poster for the tour
- Location: Europe
- Associated album: Ultimate Collection
- Start date: April 3, 2016
- End date: August 12, 2017
- Legs: 4
- No. of shows: 100

Anastacia concert chronology
- Resurrection Tour (2014–15); Ultimate Collection Tour (2016–17); Evolution Tour (2018)

The Ultimate Collection Tour (also known as Ultimate Collection Live) was the fourth headlining concert tour by American recording artist Anastacia in support of her second greatest hits album, Ultimate Collection (2015). The tour began in April 2016 and played 100 shows in Europe.

After her stint on Strictly Come Dancing, the singer announced the third leg of the tour.

This was followed by forthcoming release of a live album of the tour. The album, A 4 App, was released on December 16, 2016. The album features fan requested songs chosen from her app. In May 2017, the singer released live recordings of the shows in Manchester and London.

== Setlist ==
The following setlist was obtained from the April 4, 2016, concert held in Milan, Italy; at the Gran Teatro Linear4 Ciak. It does not represent all concerts throughout the tour.

1. "Instrumental Sequence"
2. "Army of Me"
3. "Sick and Tired"
4. "Stupid Little Things"
5. "Instrumental Sequence"
6. "Paid My Dues"
7. "Welcome to My Truth"
8. "Pieces of a Dream"
9. "Why'd You Lie to Me"
10. "Cowboys & Kisses"
11. "The Saddest Part"
12. "In Your Eyes"
13. "Everything Burns"
14. "Dance Sequence" (contains elements of "Lifeline")
15. "Heavy on My Heart"
16. "Stay"
17. "You'll Never Be Alone"
18. "I Belong to You (Il Ritmo della Passione)"
19. "Instrumental Sequence"
20. "Not That Kind"
21. "Love Is a Crime"
22. "I'm Outta Love"

Encore

23. "Left Outside Alone"
24. "One Day in Your Life"

== Tour dates ==
Date	City	Country	Venue
Europe
April 3, 2016	Padova	Italy	Gran Teatro Geox
April 4, 2016	Milan	Italy	Gran Teatro Linear4 Ciak
April 6, 2016	Bolzano	Italy	PalaResia
April 8, 2016^{[A]}	Barcelona	Spain	Sala 1 Pau Casals
April 9, 2016	Madrid	Spain	Palacio Municipal de Congresos
April 17, 2016	Kempten	Germany	Bigbox Allgäu
April 18, 2016	Nuremberg	Germany	Meistersingerhalle
April 20, 2016	Utrecht	Netherlands	Ronda
April 21, 2016	Luxembourg City	Luxembourg	Den Atelier
April 23, 2016	Paris	France	Le Trianon
April 24, 2016	Brussels	Belgium	Ancienne Belgique
April 26, 2016	Hamburg	Germany	Mehr! Theater am Großmarkt
April 27, 2016	Hanover	Germany	Theater am Aegi
April 29, 2016	Stuttgart	Germany	Beethoven-Saal
April 30, 2016	Berlin	Germany	Admiralspalast
May 2, 2016	London	England	London Palladium
May 3, 2016	Birmingham	England	Symphony Hall
May 5, 2016	Manchester	England	Albert Hall
May 6, 2016	Glasgow	Scotland	Glasgow Royal Concert Hall
May 8, 2016	Dublin	Ireland	Olympia Theatre
May 10, 2016	Gateshead	England	Sage One
May 12, 2016	Groningen	Netherlands	De Oosterpoort
May 14, 2016^{[B]}	Siegen	Germany	Großes Zelttheater
June 4, 2016^{[C]}	Esbjerg	Denmark	Vognsbølparken
June 6, 2016	Mannheim	Germany	Rosengarten Mozartsaal
June 9, 2016^{[D]}	London	England	Hampton Court Palace
June 17, 2016	Essen	Germany	Colosseum Theater
June 19, 2016	Zürich	Switzerland	Kongresssaal
June 20, 2016	Lausanne	Switzerland	Théâtre de Beaulieu
June 22, 2016	Budapest	Hungary	László Papp Budapest Sports Arena
June 24, 2016	Halle	Germany	Händel Halle
June 25, 2016^{[E]}	The Hague	Netherlands	Zuiderpark
June 26, 2016^{[F]}	Genk	Belgium	Stadsplein 1
June 29, 2016	Bilbao	Spain	Euskalduna Conference Centre
July 1, 2016	Murcia	Spain	Cuartel de Artillería
July 2, 2016	Valencia	Spain	Jardines de Los Viveros
July 4, 2016^{[G]}	Straubing	Germany	Festspielplatz – Am Hagen
July 5, 2016	Verbania	Italy	Teatro Magiore
July 6, 2016^{[H]}	Carpi	Italy	Piazza dei Martiri
July 9, 2016^{[I]}	Tysnes	Norway	Kontor
July 11, 2016^{[J]}	Munich	Germany	Tollwood Musik-Arena
July 12, 2016^{[K]}	Dinslaken	Germany	Burgtheater Dinslaken
July 14, 2016^{[L]}	Schopfheim	Germany	Marktplatz Schopfheim
July 15, 2016^{[M]}	Giessen	Germany	Open-Air-Kino-Gelände
July 16, 2016^{[K]}	Dinslaken	Germany	Burgtheater Dinslaken
July 19, 2016^{[N]}	Grugliasco	Italy	Gru Village
July 20, 2016^{[O]}	Lucca	Italy	Piazza Napoleone
July 22, 2016	Taormina	Italy	Teatro Anfiteatro Greco di Taormina
July 23, 2016	Palermo	Italy	Teatro di Verdura
July 24, 2016	Pula	Italy	Forte Arena
July 26, 2016^{[P]}	Rottweil	Germany	Ferienzauber Rottweil
July 28, 2016^{[Q]}	Rudkøbing	Denmark	Rue Mark 11
July 30, 2016^{[R]}	Oulu	Finland	Koskikeskus Island
August 2, 2016	Monte Urano	Italy	Piazza della Libertà
August 4, 2016	Ostuni	Italy	Foro Boario
March 11, 2017	Merkers	Germany	Erlebnisbergwerk Konzertsaal
March 12, 2017	Wuppertal	Germany	Uni-Halle
March 15, 2017	Saarbrücken	Germany	Saarlandhalle
March 24, 2017^{[S]}	Warsaw	Poland	Torwar Hall
March 25, 2017^{[S]}	Łódź	Poland	Atlas Arena
April 23, 2017^{[T]}	Samnaun	Switzerland	Alp Trida
May 5, 2017^{[U]}	Bern	Switzerland	Kursaal Arena
May 6, 2017	Zug	Switzerland	Bossard Arena
May 24, 2017	Basingstoke	England	The Anvil
May 25, 2017	Bristol	England	Colston Hall
May 27, 2017	Manchester	England	O_{2} Apollo Manchester
May 28, 2017	Birmingham	England	Symphony Hall
May 30, 2017	Glasgow	Scotland	Glasgow Royal Concert Hall
May 31, 2017	Edinburgh	Scotland	Usher Hall
June 1, 2017	Gateshead	England	Sage One
June 3, 2017	Sheffield	England	Sheffield City Hall
June 4, 2017	Cardiff	Wales	St David's Hall
June 5, 2017	Nottingham	England	Nottingham Royal Concert Hall
June 7, 2017	Ipswich	England	Regent Theatre
June 8, 2017	London	England	Eventim Apollo
June 10, 2017	Bournemouth	England	Windsor Hall
June 11, 2017	Brighton	England	Brighton Dome
July 5, 2017^{[V]}	Madrid	Spain	Plaza Central del Real Jardín Botánico
July 7, 2017^{[W]}	Tortona	Italy	Piazza Allende
July 8, 2017^{[X]}	Schaan	Liechtenstein	Saal am Lindaplatz
July 9, 2017^{[Y]}	Weert	Netherlands	Riviereweg
July 11, 2017^{[Z]}	Pesaro	Italy	Stadio Tonino Benelli
July 12, 2017^{[AA]}	Marostica	Italy	Piazza Castello
July 14, 2017^{[AB]}	Calella de Palafrugell	Italy	Auditori a l'aire liure
July 15, 2017^{[AC]}	Marbella	Spain	Auditorio de Marbella
July 17, 2017^{[AD]}	Tuttlingen	Germany	Burg Honberg
July 18, 2017^{[AE]}	Singen	Germany	Festung Hohentwiel
July 20, 2017^{[AF]}	Winterbach	Germany	Festivalgelände Fabrikstraße
July 21, 2017^{[AG]}	Freiburg	Germany	Naturerlebnispark Mundenhof
July 22, 2017^{[AH]}	Bad Lippspringe	Germany	Arminiuspark
July 25, 2017^{[AI]}	Ebern	Germany	Schloss Eyrichshof
July 26, 2017^{[AJ]}	Calw	Germany	Kloster Hirsau
July 29, 2017^{[AK]}	Flisa	Norway	Finnskogen
August 2, 2017^{[AL]}	Schwetzingen	Germany	Schwetzinger Schlossgarten
August 4, 2017^{[AM]}	Alzey	Germany	Alzeyer Schlosshof
August 5, 2017^{[AN]}	Hamburg	Germany	Parkplatz am Born Center
August 6, 2017^{[AO]}	Warendorf	Germany	Freibad am Emssee
August 8, 2017	Hanau	Germany	Amphitheater Hanau
August 11, 2017^{[AP]}	Troisdorf	Germany	Stadthalle Troisdorf
August 12, 2017^{[AQ]}	Middelkerke	Belgium	Sportpark De Krokodiel

Festivals and other miscellaneous performances

^{A} This concert was a part of the "Festival Mil·lenni"
^{B} This concert was a part of "KulturPur"
^{C} This concert was a part of the "Esbjerg Rock Festival"
^{D} This concert was a part of the "Hampton Court Palace Festival"
^{E} This concert was a part of "Night at the Park"
^{F} This concert was a part of "Genk on Stage"
^{G} This concert was a part of "Bluetone"
^{H} This concert was a part of "Carpi Summer Fest"
^{I} This concert was a part of "Tysnesfest"
^{J} This concert was a part of "Tollwood Summerfestival"
^{K} This concert was a part of "Fantastival"
^{L} This concert was a part of "Sommersound"
^{M} This concert was a part of "Open-Air-Kino-Gelände Gießen"
^{N} This concert was a part of "Gru Village Festival"
^{O} This concert was a part of "Lucca Summer Festival"
^{P} This concert was a part of "Rottweiler Ferienzauber"
^{Q} This concert was a part of "Langelands Festival"
^{R} This concert was a part of "Qstock"
^{S} These concerts were a part of the "Night of the Proms"
^{T} This concert was a part of the "International Spring Snow Festival"
^{U} This concert was a part of "Moments in Music"
^{V} This concert was a part of "Noches del Botánico"
^{W} This concert was a part of "Arena Derthona"
^{X} The concert was a part of "FL1 Life"
^{Y} This concert was a part of "Bospop"
^{Z} This concert was a part of the "RDS Summer Song"
^{AA} This concert was a part of the "Marostica Summer Festival"
^{AB} This concert was a part of the "Festival de Cap Roig"
^{AC} This concert was a part of the "Starlite Festival"
^{AD} This concert was a part of the "Tuttlinger Honberg-Sommer"
^{AE} This concert was a part of "Hohentwielfestival"
^{AF} This concert was a part of "Zeltspektakel"
^{AG} This concert was a part of the "Zelt-Musik-Festival"
^{AH} This concert was a part of "Landesgartenschau"
^{AI} This concert was a part of the "Rösler Open Air"
^{AJ} This concert was a part of "Calwer Klostersommer in Hirsau"
^{AK} This concert was a part of "Trestokkfestivalen"
^{AL} This concert was a part of "Musik im Park"
^{AM} This concert was a part of the "Da Capo Festival"
^{AN} This concert was a part of the "Sommertour"
^{AO} This concert was a part of the "Warendorf Live"
^{AP} This concert was a part of "Open.Air.Platz Troisdorf"
^{AQ} This concert was a part of the "Nostalgie Beach Festival"

Cancellations and rescheduled shows

April 11, 2016	Zürich, Switzerland	Kongresssaal	Rescheduled to June 19, 2016
April 12, 2016	Lausanne, Switzerland	Théâtre de Beaulieu	Rescheduled to June 20, 2016
April 14, 2016	Essen, Germany	Colosseum Theater	Rescheduled to June 17, 2016
April 15, 2016	Mannheim, Germany	Rosengarten Mozartsaal	Rescheduled to June 6, 2016

=== Box office score data ===
Venue	City	Tickets sold / Available	Gross revenue
Eventim Apollo	London	1,810 / 2,866 (63%)	$133,309

== Band ==
- Drums: Steve Barney
- Guitar: DeeRal Aldridge, Anders Grahn
- Bass guitar: Orefo Orakwue
- Keyboards: Gary Sanctuary
- Backing vocalist: Maria Quintile
- Dancers: Christine Anderson and Anjula Kelly-Nair
