= Ultimate Collection (Anastacia album) =

Greatest hits album by Anastacia
- Released: November 6, 2015
- Recorded: 1999–2015
- Length: 62:30
- Label: Sony Music
- Producer: Sam Watters; Louis Biancaniello; Dallas Austin; Glen Ballard; Ric Wake; Richie Jones; Michael Biancaniello; Ben Moody; Jay Baumgardner; John Shanks; David Hodges; The Shadowmen; Greg Lawson; Eros Ramazzotti; Claudio Guidetti; Jamie Hartman; MdL; Tom Meredith; Ryan Louder

Anastacia chronology
Resurrection (2014)	Ultimate Collection (2015)	A 4 App (2016)

Singles from Ultimate Collection
- 1. "Take This Chance" Released: September 29, 2015; 2. "Army of Me" Released: October 23, 2015

Ultimate Collection is a compilation album by American recording artist Anastacia, released on November 6, 2015 by Sony Music. The album includes singles from five of the singer's previous albums Not That Kind (2000), Freak of Nature (2001), Anastacia (2004), It's a Man's World (2012), Resurrection (2014) and songs taken from Anastacia's first greatest hits Pieces of a Dream (2005). Two new songs are also contained in the track list: a cover of Christina Aguilera's "Army of Me" and the lead single, "Take This Chance". Singles from Anastacia's fourth album Heavy Rotation (2008) were excluded from the project.

== Background ==
In August 2015, it was announced that after nine years, Anastacia had reunited with her original label Sony Music Entertainment.

== Promotion ==
On October 31, Anastacia performed at Heaven Night Club. The performance included the new song "Army of Me", as well as "Paid My Dues", "I'm Outta Love" and "Left Outside Alone". On November 4, she went to BBC Breakfast as well as BBC Radio Wales. On November 6, Anastacia was interviewed at ITV's Lorraine. On November 7, she appear and perform 2 songs on BBC Radio 2 and on November 8, she appear on The National Lottery Live.

To further promote the compilation, Anastacia embarked on the accompanying the Ultimate Collection Tour in April 2016.

== Track listing ==
Ultimate Collection
No.	Title	Writer(s)	Producer(s)	Length
1.	"I'm Outta Love"	Anastacia; Sam Watters; Louis Biancaniello	Watters; L. Biancaniello	4:05
2.	"Left Outside Alone"	Anastacia; Dallas Austin; Glen Ballard	Austin; Ballard	4:07
3.	"Sick and Tired"	Anastacia; Austin; Ballard	Austin; Ballard	3:32
4.	"Paid My Dues"	Greg Lawson; Damon Sharpe; LaMenga Kafi; Anastacia	Ric Wake; Richie Jones	3:22
5.	"Stupid Little Things"	Anastacia; Watters; L. Biancaniello; Michael Biancaniello; Courtney Harrell	L. Biancaniello; Watters; M. Biancaniello	3:55
6.	"Not That Kind"	Anastacia; Will Wheaton; Marvin Young	Wake	3:23
7.	"Everything Burns" (Ben Moody featuring Anastacia)	Moody	Moody; Jay Baumgardner	3:45
8.	"Welcome to My Truth"	Anastacia; Kara DioGuardi; John Shanks	Shanks	4:04
9.	"You'll Never Be Alone"	Anastacia; L. Biancaniello; Watters	L. Biancaniello; Watters	4:38
10.	"Pieces of a Dream"	Anastacia; Ballard; David Hodges	Hodges	4:03
11.	"Best of You"	Dave Grohl; Taylor Hawkins; Nate Mendel; Chris Shiflett	Ballard	4:01
12.	"Heavy on My Heart"	Anastacia; Billy Mann	Ballard	4:28
13.	"One Day in Your Life" (European version)	Anastacia; Watters; L. Biancaniello	Watters; L. Biancaniello	3:29
14.	"Cowboys & Kisses"	Anastacia; JIVE; Charlie Pennachio	Wake; The Shadowmen	4:32
15.	"Why'd You Lie to Me"	Anastacia; Sharpe; Lawson; Trey Parker; Damon Butler; Canela Cox	Wake	3:45
16.	"Love Is a Crime"	Lawson; Denise Rich; Sharpe; Wake	Wake	3:20
17.	"I Belong to You (El Ritmo de la Pasión)" (with Eros Ramazzotti)	Ramazzotti; Claudio Guidetti; Anastacia; DioGuardi; Kaballà	Ramazzotti; Guidetti	4:27
18.	"Army of Me"	Christina Aguilera; Jamie Hartman; David Glass; Phil Bentley	Hartman	3:25
19.	"Take This Chance"	Giorgio Tuinfort; Johan Carlsson; Caitlin Morris; David Guetta; Steve Diamond; Jacob Luttrell; Anastacia	MdL; Tom Meredith; Ryan Louder	4:20
Total length:				62:29

== Charts ==
Chart (2015–2016)	Peak position
Belgian Albums (Ultratop Flanders)	78
Belgian Albums (Ultratop Wallonia)	133
Dutch Albums (Album Top 100)	69
German Albums (Offizielle Top 100)	65
Irish Albums (IRMA)	98
Italian Albums (FIMI)	27
Scottish Albums (OCC)	11
Spanish Albums (Promusicae)	51
Swiss Albums (Schweizer Hitparade)	41
UK Albums (OCC)	10
UK Album Downloads (OCC)	13

== Certifications ==
Region	Certification	Certified units/sales
United Kingdom (BPI)	Gold	100,000^{‡}
^{‡} Sales+streaming figures based on certification alone.

== Release history ==
Region	Date	Format(s)	Label	Ref.
Worldwide	November 6, 2015	CD; digital download	Sony Music	
