= Resurrection Tour =

2014–15 concert tour by Anastacia

- Tour by Anastacia
- Promotional poster for the tour
- Associated album: Resurrection
- Start date: October 19, 2014
- End date: August 28, 2015
- Legs: 3
- No. of shows: 57 in Europe; 7 in Australia; 64 in total

Anastacia concert chronology
- Heavy Rotation Tour (2009); Resurrection Tour (2014–15); Ultimate Collection Tour (2016–17)

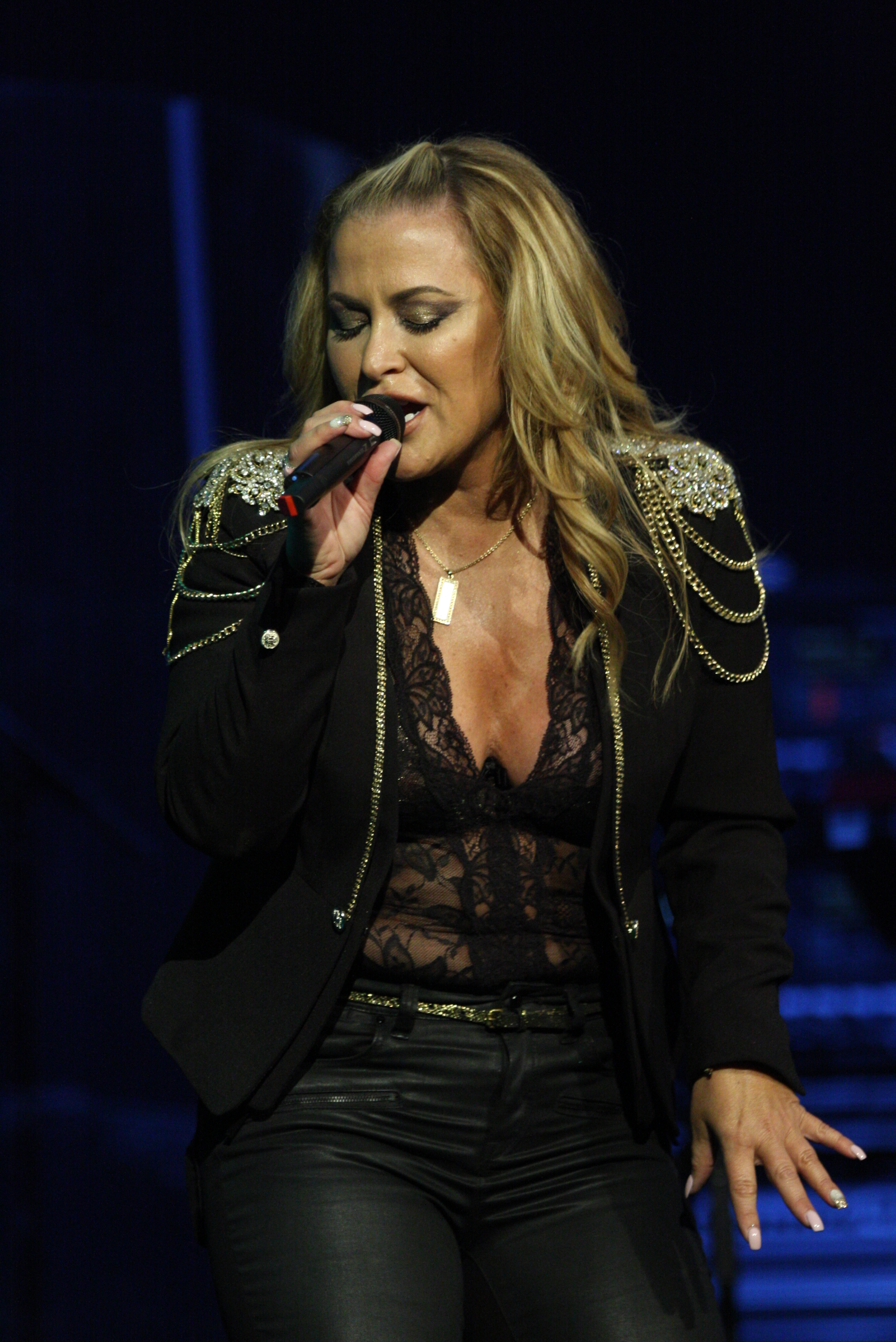
Anastacia performing on The Resurrection Tour in Sydney, Australia

The Resurrection Tour was the third headlining concert tour by the American recording artist Anastacia, and her first in 5 years, in support of her sixth studio album, Resurrection (2014). The tour began October 2014 in Europe and also visited Australia. Her biggest crowd was in Vienna, at the festival Donauinselfest on June 27, 2015; she sang for more than 100,000 people. The tour visited over 20 European countries.

== Opening act ==
- Fyre! (Europe—Leg 1)

== Setlist ==
The following setlist was obtained from the January 20, 2015, concert, at the Palladium Köln in Cologne, Germany. It does not represent all concerts during the tour.

1. "Left Outside Alone"
2. "Staring at the Sun"
3. "Sick and Tired"
4. "Pieces of a Dream"
5. "Welcome to My Truth"
6. "Heavy on My Heart"
7. "Stay"
8. "Back in Black"
9. "The Other Side of Crazy"
10. "Sweet Child o' Mine"
11. "Instrumental Sequence"
12. "Lifeline"
13. "Defeated"
14. "Broken Wings"
15. "Evolution"
16. "Stupid Little Things"
17. "Paid My Dues"

Encore

18. "Freak of Nature" (performed by backing vocalist)
19. "One Day in Your Life"
20. "I'm Outta Love"

== Tour dates ==
Date	City	Country	Venue
Europe
October 19, 2014	Brussels	Belgium	Ancienne Belgique
October 20, 2014	Amsterdam	Netherlands	Paradiso
October 23, 2014	Lisbon	Portugal	Praça de Touros do Campo Pequeno
October 25, 2014	Madrid	Spain	Palacio Municipal de Congresos de Madrid
January 11, 2015	Rome	Italy	Sala Santa Cecilia
January 12, 2015	Florence	Italy	Teatro Obihall
January 14, 2015	Milan	Italy	Fabrique
January 15, 2015	Padua	Italy	Gran Teatro Geox
January 17, 2015	Zürich	Switzerland	Kongresssaal
January 19, 2015	Munich	Germany	Kesselhaus
January 20, 2015	Cologne	Germany	Palladium Köln
January 23, 2015	London	England	O_{2} Shepherd's Bush Empire
January 24, 2015	Paris	France	Le Trianon
January 26, 2015	Frankfurt	Germany	Jahrhunderthalle
January 28, 2015	Vienna	Austria	Wiener Stadthalle, Halle F
January 30, 2015	Locarno	Switzerland	Palazetto Fevi
February 13, 2015	Minsk	Belarus	Prime Hall
February 14, 2015	Moscow	Russia	Barvikha Concert Hall
April 14, 2015^{[A]}	Zermatt	Switzerland	Zeltbühne
April 16, 2015	Sofia	Bulgaria	National Palace of Culture
April 18, 2015	Warsaw	Poland	Klub Stodoła
Australia
April 29, 2015	Sydney	Australia	The Star Event Centre
May 1, 2015	Wollongong	Australia	WIN Entertainment Centre
May 2, 2015	Gold Coast	Australia	Jupiters Theatre
May 5, 2015	Brisbane	Australia	Eaton Hills Hotel Grand Ballroom
May 7, 2015	Melbourne	Australia	Palais Theatre
May 8, 2015	Hobart	Australia	Wrest Point Entertainment Centre
May 10, 2015	Perth	Australia	Perth Concert Hall
Europe
June 23, 2015^{[B]}	Bremen	Germany	Musical Theater Bremen
June 24, 2015^{[B]}	Kiel	Germany	Kieler Woche
June 26, 2015^{[C]}	Skellefteå	Sweden	Festivalområdet
June 27, 2015^{[D]}	Vienna	Austria	Donauinsel
July 1, 2015	Belgrade	Serbia	Kombank Arena
July 3, 2015^{[E]}	Murten	Switzerland	Pantschau
July 4, 2015^{[F]}	Werchter	Belgium	Werchter Festival Grounds
July 6, 2015^{[G]}	Barcelona	Spain	Auditori Aire Lliure
July 9, 2015	Mainz	Germany	Mainzer Zitadelle
July 11, 2015^{[H]}	Weert	Netherlands	Evenemententerrein Weert Noord
July 12, 2015^{[I]}	Luxembourg City	Luxembourg	Place Guillaume II
July 14, 2015^{[J]}	Brescia	Italy	Piazza della Loggia
July 15, 2015	Cattolica	Italy	Arena della Regina
July 17, 2015^{[K]}	Zürich	Switzerland	Dolder Kunsteisbahn
July 18, 2015^{[L]}	Locarno	Switzerland	Piazza Grande
July 20, 2015	Palermo	Italy	Teatro di Verdura
July 22, 2015^{[M]}	Rome	Italy	Cavea dell'Auditorium Parco della Musica
July 23, 2015	Pescara	Italy	Teatro monumento Gabriele D'Annunzio
July 25, 2015^{[N]}	Piazzola sul Brenta	Italy	Company Arena
July 26, 2015^{[O]}	Tarvisio	Italy	Piazza Unità Tarvisio
July 28, 2015^{[P]}	Grugliasco	Italy	Arena Esterna Le Gru
July 30, 2015^{[Q]}	Lauchheim	Germany	Schloss Kapfenburg Festivalbühne
August 1, 2015^{[R]}	Ringsted	Denmark	Lystanlægget
August 5, 2015^{[S]}	Meersburg	Germany	Neues Schlossplatz
August 7, 2015^{[T]}	Rottenburg am Neckar	Germany	Eugen-Bolz-Platz
August 8, 2015	Leipzig	Germany	Parkbühne am Clara-Zetkin-Park
August 13, 2015^{[U]}	Larvotto	Monaco	Salle des Étoiles
August 15, 2015^{[V]}	Harstad	Norway	Festivalområdet Harstad
August 16, 2015	Oslo	Norway	Rockefeller Music Hall
August 18, 2015^{[W]}	Marbella	Spain	Auditorio Starlite
August 21, 2015^{[X]}	Bochum	Germany	Sparkassen-Zelt
August 23, 2015	Hohenems	Austria	Tennis.Event.Center
August 25, 2015	Tirana	Albania	Qemal Stafa Stadium
August 27, 2015	Barletta	Italy	Moat of the Castle of Barletta
August 28, 2015	Naples	Italy	Teatro Partenope

Festivals and other miscellaneous performances

^{A} This concert was a part of the "Zermatt Unplugged"
^{B} This concert featured the Bremer Philharmoniker
^{C} This concert was a part of the "Stadsfesten Skellefteå"
^{D} This concert was a part of the "Donauinselfest"
^{E} This concert was a part of the "Stars of Sounds Openair Festival"
^{F} This concert was a part of the "TW Classic"
^{G} This concert was a part of the "Festival Jardins de Pedralbes de Barcelona"
^{H} This concert was a part of the "Bospop"
^{I} This concert was a part of "Rock um Knuedler"
^{J} This concert was a part of the "Brescia Summer Festival"
^{K} This concert was a part of "Live at Sunset"
^{L} This concert was a part of "Moon and Stars"

^{M} This concert was a part of "Luglio suona bene"
^{N} This concert was a part of the "Hydrogen Live Festival"
^{O} This concert was a part of the "No Borders Music Festival"
^{P} This concert was a part of the "GruVillage Festival"
^{Q} This concert was a part of the "Festival Schloss Kapfenburg"
^{R} This concert was a part of the "Ringsted Festival"
^{S} This concert was a part of the "Meersburg Open Air"
^{T} This concert was a part of the "Rottenburger Sommer Open Air"
^{U} This concert was a part of the "Monte-Carlo Sporting Summer Festival"
^{V} This concert was a part of "Bakgården"
^{W} This concert was a part of the "Starlite Festival"
^{X} This concert was a part of the "Zeltfestival Ruhr"

Cancellations and rescheduled shows

October 25, 2014	Madrid, Spain	Sala La Riviera	Moved to the Palacio Municipal de Congresos de Madrid
October 27, 2014	Milan, Italy	Fabrique	Rescheduled to January 14, 2015
October 29, 2014	Rome, Italy	Sala Santa Cecilia	Rescheduled to January 11, 2015
October 30, 2014	Florence, Italy	Teatro Obihall	Rescheduled to January 12, 2015
November 1, 2014	Padua, Italy	Gran Teatro Geox	Rescheduled to January 15, 2015
November 3, 2014	Zürich, Switzerland	Kongresssaal	Rescheduled to January 17, 2015
November 5, 2014	Munich, Germany	Kesselhaus	Rescheduled to January 19, 2015
November 10, 2014	Cologne, Germany	E-Werk	Rescheduled to January 20, 2015, and moved to the Palladium Köln
November 12, 2014	Frankfurt, Germany	Jahrhunderthalle	Rescheduled to January 26, 2015
November 13, 2014	Vienna, Austria	Wiener Stadthalle, Halle F	Rescheduled to January 28, 2015
November 16, 2014	Paris, France	Le Trianon	Rescheduled to January 24, 2015
November 17, 2014	London, England	O_{2} Shepherd's Bush Empire	Rescheduled to January 23, 2015
April 24, 2015	Christchurch, New Zealand	Horncastle Arena	Cancelled
April 26, 2015	Auckland, New Zealand	ASB Theatre	Cancelled
May 5, 2015	Hobart, Australia	Wrest Point Entertainment Centre	Rescheduled to May 8, 2015
May 8, 2015	Adelaide, Australia	Festival Theatre	Cancelled

=== Box office score data ===
Venue	City	Tickets sold / Available	Gross revenue
Palais Theatre	Melbourne	1,813 / 1,813 (100%)	$122,413
