= Evolution (Anastacia album) =

Studio album by Anastacia
- Released: September 15, 2017
- Genre: Pop rock
- Length: 45:00
- Label: Four Eyez; Polydor; Universal
- Producer: Robin Ahlm; Anders Bagge; Louis Biancaniello; Can "Stress" Canatan; John Fields; Alex Geringas; Anders Grahn; Yei Gonzalez; Jakob Redtzer; Johan Röhr; Sam Watters

Anastacia chronology
A 4 App (2016)	Evolution (2017)	Our Songs (2023)

Singles from Evolution
- 1. "Caught in the Middle" Released: July 28, 2017

Evolution is the seventh studio album by American recording artist Anastacia. It was released on September 15, 2017 through Four Eyez Productions, Polydor Records and Universal Music Group. This marked Anastacia's first album of original material in three years since Resurrection (2014). A pop rock album with dance elements, Evolution was preceded by the release of one single, "Caught in the Middle".

== Background and promotion ==
The album was chiefly recorded and produced by Swedish musician Anders Bagge and recorded in Stockholm, while Anastacia was still on her Ultimate Collection Tour during the summer of 2016. Regarding the album title, she said: "At first I wanted to title this album Stamina, but the word sounded too clinical. When I wrote it, I realized I was stronger than I thought. I would like to awaken strength and courage in my listeners too." Her record company Universal Music Group described the album as "pure energy with bursting rock numbers, catchy pop songs and touching ballads."

== Promotion ==
In support of the album, Anastacia performed on Starnacht in der Wachau on September 1, 2017, followed by an appearance on the Nürburgring on September 10, 2017. From September 10 to 14, Anastacia did several interviews in radio stations, such as Bayern 1, RTL Radio Center, Hamburg Zwei, and Hamburg Journal. On September 29, 2017, she was a guest on German talk show Riverboat. On December 14 2017, Anastacia performed the ballad "My Everything" at the José Carreras Gala in Germany.

=== Singles ===
Evolution's first and only single "Caught in the Middle" was written by Anders Bagge, Lauren Dyson, Javier Gonzalez, and Ninos Hanna and released digitally on July 28, 2017. A video for the song was released one week later on August 4, 2017 on VEVO.

== Critical reception ==
Professional ratings
Review scores
Source	Rating
Laut.de	1/5 stars
The Guardian	3/5 stars

The Guardian critic Rachel Aroesti rated the album three out of five stars and wrote: "Evolution, [Anastacia's] seventh album, is unlikely to propel her back into similar levels of stardom, but it once again provides a welcome alternative to the current pop status quo – a slightly nauseating sound that mixes nursery rhyme chants with loud, abrasive production. Managing to feel anthemic in a gentler and more pleasingly melodic way, its songwriting proves as robust as Anastacia’s still inimitable pipes, genre-hopping between rock, dance and slower, musical-style numbers with dexterity and warmth." Renowned for Sound editor Haydon Benfield remarked that "much like her previous records, Evolution places Anastacia’' powerful mezzo-soprano at the centre of proceedings with the music providing an eclectic – yet coherent blend of electronic and dance, funk and soul, and rock and pop. So perhaps Evolution is a bit of a misnomer, but Anastacia’s music does continue to provide a refreshing – if not fresh – alternative to the usual pop offerings [...] With Evolution, Anastacia continues to offer a solid alternative to mainstream pop although it won’t see her racing back up the charts."

== Track listing ==
Evolution track listing
No.	Title	Writer(s)	Producer(s)	Length
1.	"Caught in the Middle"	Anders Bagge; Lauren Dyson; Javier Gonzalez; Ninos Hanna	Bagge; Yei Gonzalez	2:57
2.	"Redlight"	Anastacia; Bagge; Jimmy Claeson; Y. Gonzalez; Faye Medeson	Bagge; Y. Gonzalez	3:15
3.	"Stamina"	Alex Shield; Sharon Vaughn; Charlotte Kjær	Bagge; Johan Röhr	3:46
4.	"Boxer"	Anastacia; Samuel Gajicki; Ninsun Poli; Robin Strandlund	Bagge; Röhr	3:48
5.	"My Everything"	Anastacia; Bagge; Can "Stress" Canatan; Linnea Deb; Hanna; Victor Thell	Bagge; Röhr	3:05
6.	"Nobody Loves Me Better"	Robin Ahlm; Bagge; Stran Cetin; Emelie Eriksson; Alvora Larsdotter	Bagge; Ahlm	3:23
7.	"Reckless"	Louis Biancaniello; Sam Watters; Marley Munroe	Biancaniello; Watters	3:08
8.	"Not Coming Down"	Anastacia; Y. Gonzalez; Eriksson; Hanna; Marcus Holmberg	Y. Gonzalez; Bagge	3:22
9.	"Before"	Anastacia; Wilhelm Börjesson; Jakob Redtzer; Poli	Redtzer; Bagge	3:48
10.	"Pain"	Anastacia; Bagge; Tommy Denander; Y. Gonzalez; Tony Malm; Santi Rodriguez Liem; Emil Schmidt	Bagge; Y. Gonzalez	3:52
11.	"Why"	Anastacia; Bagge; Anders Grahn; Röhr	Röhr; Bagge	4:17
12.	"Boomerang"	Anastacia; Steve Diamond; John Fields	Fields; Y. Gonzalez	3:03
13.	"Higher Livin'"	Anastacia; Diamond; Alex Geringas; Grahn	Geringas; Grahn	3:16
Total length:				45:00

== Charts ==
Chart performance for Evolution
Chart (2017)	Peak position
Austrian Albums (Ö3 Austria)	15
Belgian Albums (Ultratop Flanders)	61
Belgian Albums (Ultratop Wallonia)	38
Czech Albums (ČNS IFPI)	26
Dutch Albums (Album Top 100)	86
German Albums (Offizielle Top 100)	12
Italian Albums (FIMI)	12
Spanish Albums (PROMUSICAE)	16
Swiss Albums (Schweizer Hitparade)	10
UK Album Downloads (OCC)	34

== Release history ==
Evolution release history
Region	Date	Format	Label	Ref
United States	September 15, 2017	Digital download; CD	Universal	
United Kingdom	September 15, 2017	Digital download; CD	Four Eyez Productions	
France	September 15, 2017	Digital download; CD	Polydor	
