= Heavy Rotation Tour =

2009 concert tour by Anastacia

- Tour by Anastacia
- Promotional poster for the tour
- Location: Europe
- Associated album: Heavy Rotation
- Start date: June 6, 2009
- End date: September 13, 2009
- Legs: 2
- No. of shows: 33

Anastacia concert chronology
- Live at Last Tour (2004–05); Heavy Rotation Tour (2009); Here Come the Girls (2009–10)

The Heavy Rotation Tour was the second headlining concert tour by American recording artist Anastacia in support of her fourth studio album, Heavy Rotation (2008). The singer played over 30 shows in Europe.

== Background ==
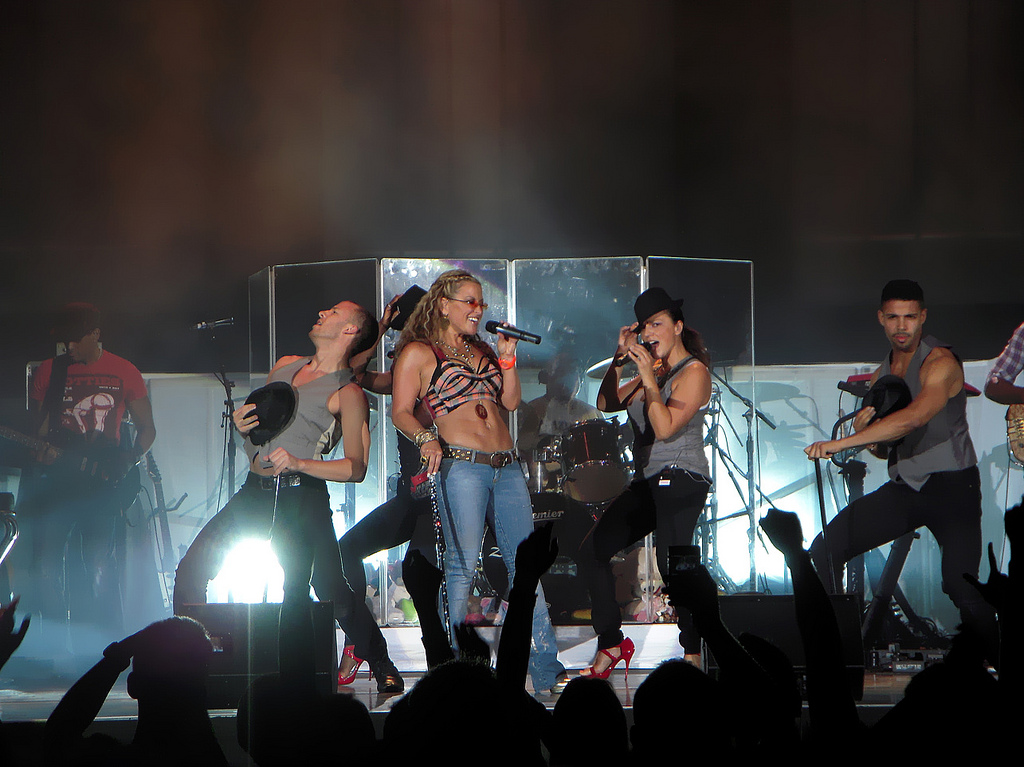
Anastacia performing in Budapest

The tour was briefly mentioned in November 2008 by Anastacia. A month later, fan footage of Anastacia leaving a hotel in Switzerland was posted on YouTube. When fans asked about the touring Zurich, Anastacia replied, "We don't have Zurich on the map yet. […] I know one of the territories close to you is Geneva […] I'm not even going to Rome on this one. That doesn't mean I don't want to come that just how they’re doing the routing." The tour was confirmed via Anastacia's official website on February 27, 2009.

Keely Myers and Chris Vaughan of "The Production Office" were responsible for the technical production of the tour. The creative director and producer of the show is Kim Gavin. Live Nation has been listed as the tour promoter. The tour venues are smaller compared to the ones performed during her first concert tour, but she said that she wanted to create a more intimate show for her fans.

Anastacia made an appearance on This Morning on May 20, 2009, to promote the tour, where she also described the theme of the show as, "[...] a full day in the life..." because of the fact that many of her songs are "very storytelling" as well as "[...] a little bit Midler, a lot of theatre action going on, but video as well". On May 22, 2009, Anastacia announced on her official blog that her mother will also be appearing with her on stage during the shows in Italy, Graz, Prague and Calella de Palafrugell.

== Critical response ==
Caroline Sullivan of The Guardian reviewed the show at the HMV Hammersmith Apollo giving it four stars out of five

Is she fazed? Not a bit. As she says toward the end of this long, vibrant show, she is so charged up that she doesn't know "what to do with this energy" [...] Forcefulness is Anastacia's stock in trade. She's a pop-soul belter of the old school, blasting out ballads and dance numbers with equal vigour [...] If it's subtlety you want, look elsewhere, but for straightforward, good-hearted entertainment, she's the go-to girl

== Opening acts ==
- Stevie Appleton (England, Wales)
- Ricardo Azevedo (Portugal)
- Sofia Sida (Helsinki)
- Miad Ballai (Stockholm)
- IdaAida (Sønderborg)
- Zakkie (Antwerp)
- King Jack (Amsterdam)
- Karima (Taormina)
- Caroline Chevin (Zürich)
- Irene Fornaciari (Rome)
- Noémi Virág (Budapest)
- Claudia Cream (Bucharest)
- Saulės Kliošas (Vilnius)
- Ani Lorak (Kyiv)

== Setlist ==
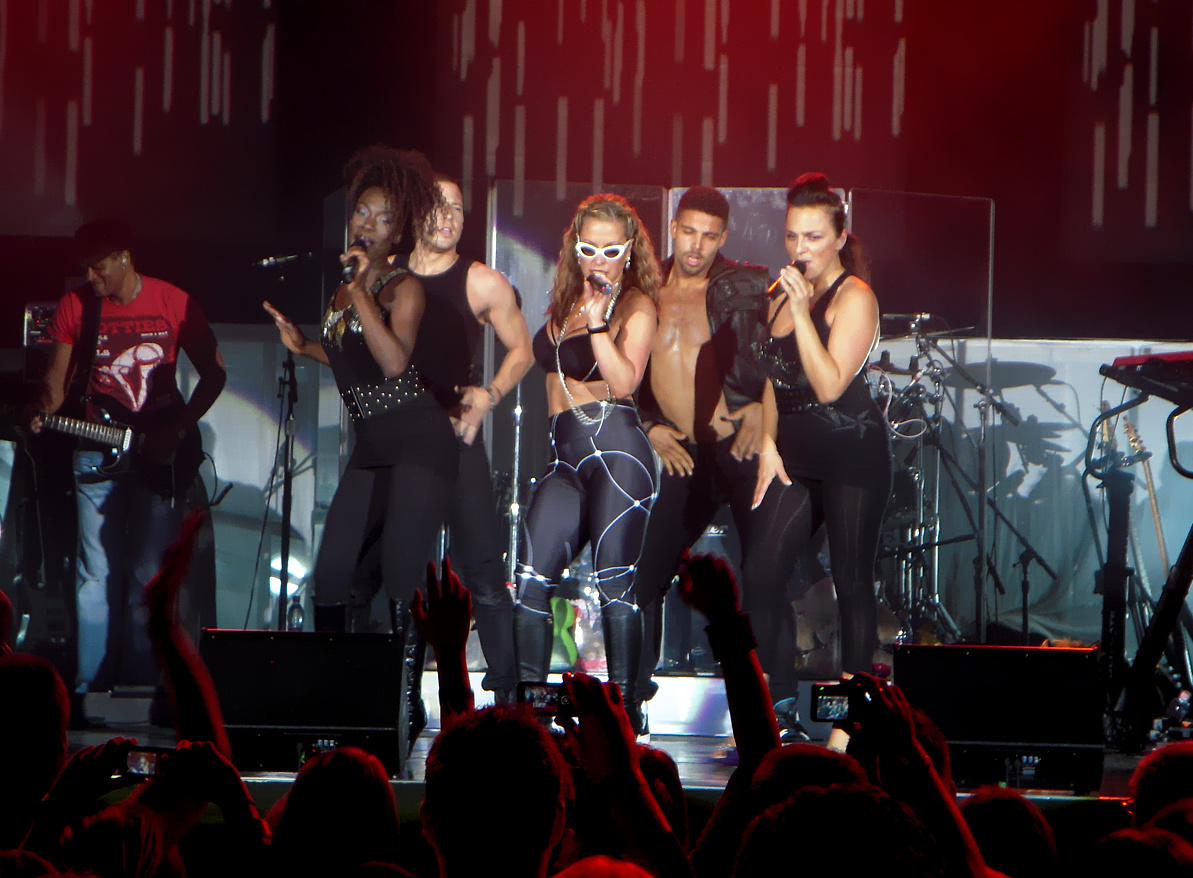
Anastacia performing "Heavy Rotation" in Budapest

The following setlist was obtained from the concert held on June 28, 2009, at the NIA Academy in Birmingham, England. It does not represent all concerts for the duration of the tour.

1. "Video Sequence"
2. "One Day in Your Life"
3. "I Can Feel You"
4. "Same Song"
5. "I Thought I Told You That"
6. "You'll Never Be Alone"
7. "Defeated"
8. "Cowboys & Kisses"
9. "Why'd You Lie to Me"
10. "In Your Eyes"
11. "You'll Be Fine"
12. "Video Sequence"
13. "Paid My Dues"
14. "Beautiful Messed Up World"
15. "Sick and Tired"
16. "I Belong to You (Il Ritmo della Passione)"
17. "Not That Kind"

Encore

18. "Heavy Rotation"
19. "I'm Outta Love"
20. "Left Outside Alone"

== Tour dates ==
| Date | City | Country | Venue |
Europe
| June 6, 2009 | Helsinki | Finland | Hartwall Areena |
| June 9, 2009 | Stockholm | Sweden | Annexet |
| June 11, 2009 | Sønderborg | Denmark | Mølleparken |
| June 13, 2009 | Antwerp | Belgium | Lotto Arena |
| June 14, 2009 | Amsterdam | Netherlands | Heineken Music Hall |
| June 16, 2009 | Baden-Baden | Germany | Festspielhaus Baden-Baden |
| June 18, 2009^{[A]} | Hamburg | Germany | Freilichtbühne im Stadtpark |
| June 19, 2009 | Düsseldorf | Germany | Philips Halle |
| June 21, 2009 | Frankfurt | Germany | Alte Oper |
| June 22, 2009 | Munich | Germany | Philharmonie im Gasteig |
| June 25, 2009 | London | England | HMV Hammersmith Apollo |
| June 26, 2009 | Cardiff | Wales | Cardiff International Arena |
| June 28, 2009 | Birmingham | England | NIA Academy |
| June 30, 2009^{[B]} | Cork | Ireland | The Docklands |
| July 2, 2009 | Manchester | England | Carling Apollo Manchester |
| July 5, 2009 | Zürich | Switzerland | Hallenstadion |
| July 8, 2009^{[C]} | Lucca | Italy | Piazza Napoleone |
| July 10, 2009 | Taormina | Italy | Teatro antico di Taormina |
| July 12, 2009 | Rome | Italy | Cavea |
| July 14, 2009 | Graz | Austria | Freiluftarena B |
| July 16, 2009 | Prague | Czech Republic | Tesla Arena |
| July 18, 2009^{[D]} | Calella de Palafrugell | Spain | Auditori del Jardí Botànic de Caixa |
| July 20, 2009^{[E]} | Madrid | Spain | Escenario Puerta del Ángel |
| July 21, 2009^{[F]} | Valencia | Spain | Jardines de Viveros |
| July 23, 2009 | Guimarães | Portugal | Pavilhão Multiusos de Guimarães |
| July 25, 2009 | Lisbon | Portugal | Pavilhão Atlântico |
| August 1, 2009^{[G]} | East Cowes | England | Osborne House |
| September 1, 2009 | Bucharest | Romania | Sala Polivalentă |
| September 3, 2009 | Esch-sur-Alzette | Luxembourg | Rockhal |
| September 5, 2009 | Bratislava | Slovakia | Sibamac Arena |
| September 6, 2009 | Budapest | Hungary | SYMA Sports and Conference Centre |
| September 10, 2009 | Vilnius | Lithuania | Siemens Arena |
| September 13, 2009 | Kyiv | Ukraine | Palace of Sports |

Festivals and other miscellaneous performances
^{A} This concert was a part of "NDR Open Air"
^{B} This concert was a part of "Live at the Marquee"
^{C} This concert was a part of the "Lucca Summer Festival"
^{D} This concert was a part of the "Festival de Cap Roig"
^{E} This concert was a part of "Veranos de la Villa"
^{F} This concert was a part of "Feria de Julio"
^{G} This concert was a part of the "Osborne House Summer Concerts"

Cancellations and rescheduled shows

| September 8, 2009 | Moscow, Russia | Olimpiyskiy North Hall | Cancelled |
| September 8, 2009 | Baku, Azerbaijan | Heydar Aliyev Palace | Cancelled |
| September 11, 2009 | Tallinn, Estonia | Saku Suurhall | Cancelled |

=== Box office score data ===
| Venue | City | Tickets sold / Available | Gross revenue |
|---|---|---|---|
| Jardines de Viveros | Valencia | 1,735 / 4,000 (43%) | $78,888 |

== Personnel ==
- Promoter: Live Nation Global Touring
- Creative Director: Kim Gavin
- Technical Production; Chris Vaughan & Keely Myers
- Musical Director: Orefo Orakwue
- Choreography: Gareth Walker
- Set Designer: Misty Buckley
- Dancers: Jay Revell and Tom Goddhall

=== Band ===
- Backing Vocals: Elizabeth Troy and Maria Quintile
- Bass Guitar: Orefo Orakwue
- Drums: Steve Barney
- Guitar: Dave Ital
- Keyboards: Hannah Vasabth and Marcus Byyrne
