= A 4 App =

Live album by Anastacia
- Released: December 16, 2016
- Recorded: July 1 – August 4, 2016
- Venue: Piazza dei Martiri, Carpi; Cuartel de Artillería, Murcia; Foro Boario, Ostuni; Teatro antico di Taormina, Taormina; Marktplatz Schopfheim, Schopfheim; Burgtheater Dinslaken, Dinslaken; Piazza della Libertà, Monte Urano; Teatro Magiore, Verbania
- Length: 43:29
- Label: Foureyez; LME

Anastacia chronology
Ultimate Collection (2015)	A 4 App (2016)	Evolution (2017)

A 4 App is a live album by American recording artist Anastacia. It has been released on December 16, 2016 through the PledgeMusic website by Sony Music. The album features a collection of non-album singles, B-Sides and unreleased tracks that were performed live during the Ultimate Collection Tour in 2016.

As part of the tour, Anastacia wanted her fans to choose which songs they'd like to hear (besides tracks already featured on the Ultimate Collection). The Anastacia App allowed her fans to vote for a particular song 24 hours prior to each concert. The most popular song each night was then added to the setlist and recorded for the album.

== Background ==
In September 2016, it was announced on PledgeMusic website that a new album would be released and that the fans could pre-order it in a signed version. 2 weeks later (October 31), the singer announced that the album would in fact be a live album with the tracks the fans voted on the Anastacia App. On a Facebook Live Q&A, the singer also said the album cover would be designed by a fan.

== Track listing ==
No.	Title	Writer(s)	Venue	Length
1.	"Resurrection"	Anastacia; Steve Diamond; John Fields	Piazza dei Martiri, Carpi, Italy	5:19
2.	"Overdue Goodbye"	Anastacia; Billy Mann	Cuartel de Artillería, Murcia, Spain	4:23
3.	"Rearview"	Anastacia; Kara DioGuardi; John Shanks	Foro Boario, Ostuni, Italy	4:25
4.	"In Your Eyes"	Anastacia; Glen Ballard	Foro Boario, Ostuni, Italy	4:17
5.	"Dark White Girl"	Anastacia; Diamond; Fields	Teatro Anfiteatro Greco di Taormina, Taormina, Italy	3:49
6.	"The Saddest Part"	Anastacia; John Rzeznik; DioGuardi	Marktplatz Schopfheim, Schopfheim, Germany	4:15
7.	"Who's Gonna Stop the Rain"	Carl Sturken; Evan Rogers	Burgtheater Dinslaken, Dinslaken, Germany	5:05
8.	"Pendulum"	Anastacia; Jamie Hartman	Piazza della Libertà, Monte Urano, Italy	3:52
9.	"Time"	Anastacia; Dallas Austin; Ballard	Teatro Magiore, Verbania, Italy	3:46
10.	"Underground Army"	Anne Preven; Scott Cutler	Burgtheater Dinslaken, Dinslaken, Germany	4:18
Total length:				43:29

== Release history ==
Region	Date	Format(s)	Label	Ref.
Various	December 16, 2016	CD	Sony Music	
Various	December 23, 2016	Digital download	Sony Music	
