= Army of Me (disambiguation) =

"Army of Me" is a 1995 song by Björk.

Army of Me may also refer to:

- Army of Me (band), American alternative rock band
- "Army of Me" (Christina Aguilera song), 2012
