= Greg Lawson (American musician) =

American songwriter and record producer

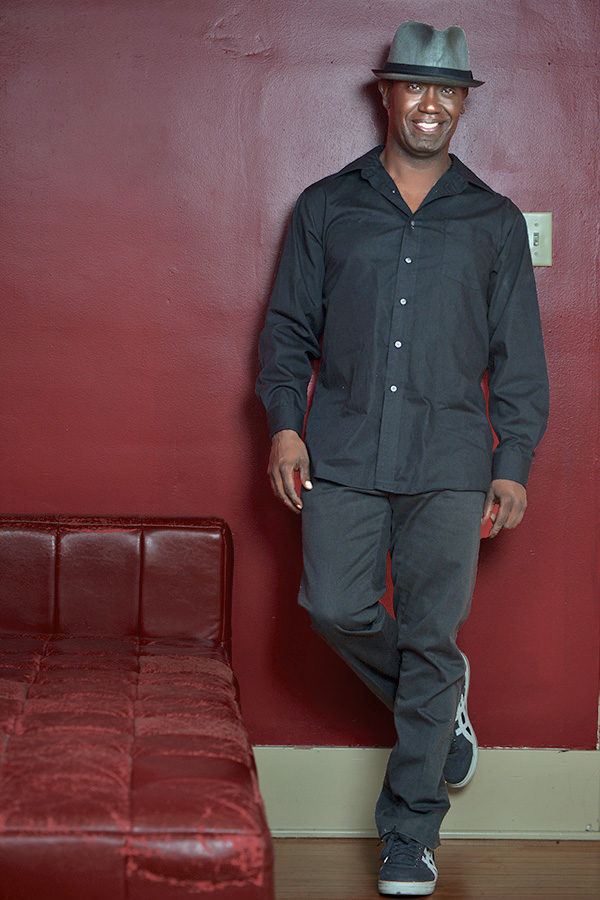

Background information
- Born: Greg Lawson
- Origin: Los Angeles, California, United States
- Occupations: Songwriter, record producer
- Years active: 1991–present

Greg Lawson is an American songwriter and record producer, who has written lyrics for Chicago: Music from the Miramax Motion Picture from the movie Chicago. He is known for soundtracks songs "Love Is a Crime" and "He Had It Comin'" from Chicago, as well as for Jennifer Lopez's "Love Don't Cost A Thing", and for Anastacia tracks including "Paid My Dues" and "Love Is a Crime".

"OopDeeWopDee", which was co-written and produced by Lawson, reached number 49 in Billboard magazine's chart.

== Awards and recognition ==
- Grammy Award winning compilation album, Chicago: Music from the Miramax Motion Picture
- Nomination for the song "Love Is a Crime" for Satellite Award for Best Original Song
