= Absolutely Positively =

Song by Anastacia

Single by Anastacia

from the album Heavy Rotation
- Released: February 28, 2009
- Length: 4:19 (album version); 3:52 (radio edit)
- Label: Mercury
- Songwriters: Chuck Harmony; Shaffer Smith
- Producer: Chuck Harmony

Anastacia singles chronology
"I Can Feel You" (2008)	"Absolutely Positively" (2009)	"Defeated" (2009)

Audio
- "Absolutely Positively" on YouTube

"Absolutely Positively" is a song by American singer Anastacia. It was written by Ne-Yo and Chuck Harmony and produced by the latter for her fourth studio album, Heavy Rotation (2008). The song was released by Mercury Records as the album's second single in February 2009, following a confirmation by Anastacia during a performance on This Morning on Monday, November 3, 2008. "Absolutely Positively" was released to European radio on November 7, 2008.

== Background ==
"Absolutely Positively" was written by American R&B singer Ne-Yo and commissioned after her record company had suggested a more "urban dance" sound for her fourth studio album, Heavy Rotation. Commenting on his contribution, Anastacia elaborated in 2009: "I was so grateful that he knew who I was and then the fact that he wrote two songs." In 2017, Anastacia admitted in an interview with Attitude that the song "just wasn't my vibe."

== Critical reception ==
Digital Spy editor Alex Fletcher wrote: "Soulful funk of "Absolutely Positively" has "Sound of 2008" stamped all over it." Another critic, Maddy Costa of The Guardian also called it "Stevie Wonder-style soul-funk." Virgin Media editor Ian Gittins praised the vocal performance, where Anastacia is "recalling vocal giants such as Patti Labelle on the playfully Motown-like "Absolutely Positively"."

== Music video ==
A music video for "Absolutely Positively" was filmed in November 2008 and directed by Nigel Dick, who also directed Anastacia's videos for "I'm Outta Love" and "Cowboys & Kisses". The music video premiered on November 28.

== Promotion ==
Anastacia performed the song in 2008 and 2009 at the following events:

- at the World Music Awards 2008 in Monte Carlo
- in Zürich at "Energy Stars for Free 2008"
- on the Paul O'Grady Show in England
- in Madrid at "Los Premios 40 Principales"
- on the Italian version of X Factor in 2009

== Track listing ==
Digital download
No.	Title	Writer(s)	Producer(s)	Length
1.	"Absolutely Positively" (radio edit)	Shaffer Smith; Chuck Harmony	Harmony	3:51
2.	"Absolutely Positively" (Moto Blanco radio mix)	Smith; Harmony	Harmony; Moto Blanco^{[A]}	3:55
3.	"Absolutely Positively" (Moto Blanco club mix)	Smith; Harmony	Harmony; Blanco^{[A]}	8:24

CD single
No.	Title	Writer(s)	Producer(s)	Length
1.	"Absolutely Positively" (radio edit)	Smith; Harmony	Harmony	3:51

Notes

- ^{^[A]} denotes additional producer

== Credits and personnel ==
- Lead vocals: Anastacia
- Background vocals: Anastacia, Ne-Yo
- Producers: Chuck Harmony
- Co-Producers: Ne-Yo
- Recorded by Chuck Harmony at The Carrington House in Atlanta, GA
- Vocals recorded by Bill Malina at Westlake Recording Studios in Los Angeles, CA

== Charts ==
Weekly chart performance for "Absolutely Positively"
Chart (2009)	Peak position
Hungary (Single Top 40)	7
Slovakia (Rádio Top 100)	39

== Release history ==
Release history for "Absolutely Positively"
Region	Date	Label	Format	Ref(s)
United Kingdom	January 10, 2009	Mercury	Radio	
Europe	February 28, 2009	Mercury	Digital download	
Germany	March 8, 2009	Mercury	CD single	
