= Staring at the Sun (Anastacia song) =

Single by Anastacia

from the album Resurrection
- Released: August 25, 2014
- Recorded: London Police Station (North Hollywood, Los Angeles)
- Genre: Pop
- Length: 3:43
- Label: BMG Rights
- Songwriters: Louis Biancaniello; Marley Munroe; Sam Watters
- Producers: Sam Watters; Louis Biancaniello

Anastacia singles chronology
"Stupid Little Things" (2014)	"Staring at the Sun" (2014)	"Lifeline" (2014)

"Staring at the Sun" is a song recorded by American singer-songwriter Anastacia from her sixth studio album, Resurrection (2014). It was written by Louis Biancaniello, Marley Munroe and Sam Watters, and produced by Watters and Biancaniello. The song was digitally released by BMG Rights as the second single from the album on August 25, 2014.

== Critical reception ==
According to Marcus Floyd of Renowned for Sound, "Staring at the Sun" is a "strong opening number" for the album where "you can hear and relate to the pain Anastacia clearly expresses with that voice of hers". Stating that the song recalls the "Anastacia’s signature sound", Pip Ellwood-Hughes of Entertainment Focus wrote that "Staring at the Sun" with her "powerful" and "soulful" vocals tear through a midtempo beat signalling that she’s back and ready to take on the charts once again. Jazz Tangcay of So So Gay considers the "perfect" song to open the album. Tangcay also stressed the vocal performance of singer in "Staring at the Sun", writing "it serves as a reminder to its listeners of just who Anastascia is and just what she’s vocally capable of". Paul Leake of Click Music comments that in the song Anastacia instead of focusing on the sad moments of her breakdown of her marriage, she use your voice to show their "undeniable resilience".

== Music video ==
On September 17, 2014, a music video for the song was released on Anastacia's official YouTube account. The music video for "Staring at the Sun" was directed by DJay Brawner and producer Anthem Films. On October 24, 2014, was released a music video for "Staring at the Sun (Digital Dog Remix)", which was directed by Ricki Neil.

== Formats and track listings ==
- Digital EP
1. "Staring at the Sun" – 3:43
2. "Staring at the Sun" (Acapella) – 3:30
3. "Staring at the Sun" (Instrumental) - 3:43
4. "Staring at the Sun" (Digital Dog Club Mix) - 5:42
- Digital Remix EP
1. "Staring at the Sun" (Radio Edit) – 3:43
2. "Staring at the Sun" (The Cube Guys Remix) – 6:07
3. "Staring at the Sun" (The Cube Guys Dub) - 6:07
4. "Staring at the Sun" (Digital Dog Club Mix) - 5:42

== Credits and personnel ==
Credits taken from Resurrection liner notes.

- Vocals: Anastacia
- Background vocals: Felicia Barton
- Writing: Louis Biancaniello, Marley Munroe, Sam Watters
- Producing: Sam Watters, Louis Biancaniello
- Keyboards and programming: Louis Biancaniello
- Mixed: Al Clay at Westside Pacific
- Mastered: Pat Sullivan at Bernie Grundman

== Charts ==
Chart (2014)	Peak position
Belgium (Ultratip Bubbling Under Wallonia)	31
CIS Airplay (TopHit)	11

== Release history ==
Release dates, record label and format details
Country	Date	Format	Label	Ref.
France	August 25, 2014	Digital EP	BMG	
Belgium	August 25, 2014	Digital EP	BMG	
Germany	August 25, 2014	Digital EP	BMG	
United Kingdom	September 1, 2014	Digital EP	BMG	
Russia	September 3, 2014	Contemporary hit radio	Studiya Soyuz	
Italy	May 8, 2015	Contemporary hit radio	BMG	
Italy	June 9, 2015	Digital EP (Remixes)	BMG	
