= Caught in the Middle (Anastacia song) =

Single by Anastacia

from the album Evolution
- Released: July 28, 2017
- Length: 2:57
- Label: Four Eyez; Polydor; Universal
- Songwriter(s): Anders Bagge; Lauren Dyson; Javier Gonzalez; Ninos Hanna
- Producer(s): Anders Bagge; Yei Gonzalez

Anastacia singles chronology
"Army of Me" (2015)	"Caught in the Middle" (2017)	"Stronger (What Doesn't Kill You)" (2020)

Music videos
- "Caught in the Middle" on YouTube

"Caught in the Middle" is a song recorded by American singer-songwriter Anastacia. Written by Anders Bagge, Lauren Dyson, Javier Gonzalez and Ninos Hanna and produced by Bagge, it was released on July 28, 2017. The song served as the lead single for her seventh studio album Evolution (2017).

== Music video ==
A music video for "Caught in the Middle" was filmed on 20–21 June 2017, and directed by Peter Svenson. The music video was released to Anastacia's VEVO on August 4, 2017.

== Track listings and formats ==
Digital download

1. "Caught in the Middle" – 2:57

== Charts ==
Chart performance for "Caught in the Middle"
Chart (2017)	Peak position
Croatia (HRT)	59

== Release history ==
Release dates and formats for "Caught in the Middle"
Region	Date	Format	Label	Ref
Various	July 28, 2017	Digital download	Four Eyez Productions	
Italy	July 28, 2017	Contemporary hit radio	Universal	
