= It's a Man's World (Anastacia album) =

Studio album by Anastacia
- Released: November 9, 2012
- Recorded: 2011–2012
- Genre: Pop rock; rock; hard rock
- Length: 48:22
- Label: BMG
- Producer: Glen Ballard

Anastacia chronology
Heavy Rotation (2008)	It's a Man's World (2012)	Resurrection (2014)

Singles from It's a Man's World
- 1. "Dream On" Released: October 26, 2012; 2. "Best of You" Released: November 2, 2012

It's a Man's World is the fifth studio album by American recording artist Anastacia. The album consists of covers of songs sung by male rock vocalists. The album was released on November 9, 2012 by BMG Rights Management, as a prelude to her then-upcoming album of original studio material, which was originally due for release in 2013.

== Background ==
The album was released digitally exclusively in Europe, with physical editions limited to select European countries and Anastacia's official store. The official store copies were all officially signed by Anastacia, and sold out in just three days. Copies available via the official store are able for purchase anywhere in Europe. Digital copies of the album contain an exclusive bonus track, a cover of Soundgarden's "Black Hole Sun". Entirely produced by Glen Ballard, the album is Anastacia's first studio album since Heavy Rotation (2008), and consists of cover versions of songs by male rock artists. The album was preceded by a promotional single, "Dream On", on October 26, 2012, before the album's official lead single, a cover of "Best of You" by the Foo Fighters, was released on November 2, 2012. A music video for the track was also released in promotion of the album. During an interview on German radio show hr3, Anastacia said of the album, "I think that in today's music market, it's a man's world. In essence, that's where the album title came from. It's also because the tracks I'm covering for this album are real men's songs. Do I think it's a man's world in the ultimate sense of the universe? No!"

== Promotion ==
In promotion of the album, Anastacia has toured extensively since July 2012, and participated in the Night of the Proms concert series as part of her tour, where she performed the album's official lead single, "Best of You". Anastacia revealed the release of the album to her British fans on an episode of The Xtra Factor, while she was a guest judge for the Glasgow auditions of the ninth series of The X Factor. She also performed tracks from the album at AIDA events in Germany and the Netherlands from September to December 2012. In further promotion of the album, Anastacia gave interviews on German radio show hr3, Dutch talk show Shownieuws, German radio show NRD, Germany's Radio Oberhausen, Swedish news channel TV4 News, British talk show Lorraine, and German television show Leute heute. She also premiered "Best of You" during the hr3 interview, and provided links for her fans to listen to previews of the album from October 13, 2012.

In December 2012, it was announced that Anastacia would embark on the It's a Man's World Tour across Europe, starting at O_{2} Shepherd's Bush Empire in London on April 6, 2013, and ending at Philharmonie in Munich on April 23. In February 2013, it was announced that the tour was to be cancelled due to Anastacia being diagnosed with breast cancer for a second time, after being in remission for nearly ten years.

== Track listing ==
No.	Title	Writer(s)	Original artist (date)	Length
1.	"Ramble On"	Jimmy Page; Robert Plant	Led Zeppelin (1969)	4:36
2.	"Best of You"	Dave Grohl; Taylor Hawkins; Nate Mendel; Chris Shiflett	Foo Fighters (2005)	4:20
3.	"Sweet Child o' Mine"	Axl Rose; Slash; Izzy Stradlin; Duff McKagan; Steven Adler	Guns N' Roses (1988)	3:58
4.	"You Can't Always Get What You Want"	Mick Jagger; Keith Richards	The Rolling Stones (1969)	5:40
5.	"One"	Bono; The Edge; Adam Clayton; Larry Mullen Jr.	U2 (1991)	3:50
6.	"Back in Black"	Angus Young; Malcolm Young; Brian Johnson	AC/DC (1980)	4:30
7.	"Dream On"	Steven Tyler	Aerosmith (1973)	4:35
8.	"Use Somebody"	Jared Followill; Matthew Followill; Nathan Followill; Caleb Followill	Kings of Leon (2008)	3:57
9.	"You Give Love a Bad Name"	Jon Bon Jovi; Desmond Child; Richie Sambora	Bon Jovi (1986)	4:04
10.	"Wonderwall"	Noel Gallagher	Oasis (1995)	3:57
Total length:				43:08

iTunes bonus track
No.	Title	Writer(s)	Original artist (date)	Length
11.	"Black Hole Sun"	Chris Cornell	Soundgarden (1994)	4:54
Total length:				48:22

== Personnel ==
Credits for It's a Man's World adapted from liner notes.

- Anastacia – vocals
- Glen Ballard – producer
- Scott Campbell – engineer, mixing
- Julian People Studio – art direction, design
- Samur Khouja – second engineer
- Andrew Macpherson – photography
- Bill Malina – engineer
- Jeremy Miller – second engineer
- Peter Stanislaus – second engineer
- Angela Vicari – production coordinator
- Sadaharu Yagi – second engineer

== Charts ==
Chart (2012–13)	Peak position
Austrian Albums (Ö3 Austria)	27
Belgian Albums (Ultratop Flanders)	25
Belgian Albums (Ultratop Wallonia)	51
Dutch Albums (Album Top 100)	7
German Albums (Offizielle Top 100)	16
Spanish Albums (Promusicae)	89
Swiss Albums (Schweizer Hitparade)	16
