= Chicago (soundtrack) =

Chicago: Music from the Miramax Motion Picture

Soundtrack album by Various artists
- Released: November 19, 2002
- Recorded: 2002
- Studios: Metalworks Studios, Mississauga, ON
- Genres: Pop, jazz, hip hop
- Length: 69:44
- Label: Epic Records
- Producer: Various artists

Singles from Chicago: Music From the Miramax Motion Picture
- 1. "Love Is a Crime" Released: January 18, 2003

Chicago: Music from the Miramax Motion Picture is a soundtrack album featuring all of the original songs of the 2002 Best Picture Academy Award-winning musical film Chicago starring Renée Zellweger, Catherine Zeta-Jones, Richard Gere, Queen Latifah, John C. Reilly, Mýa Harrison and Christine Baranski.

== Track listing ==
No.	Title	Writer(s)	Performer	Length
1.	"Overture/And All That Jazz"	John Kander and Fred Ebb	Catherine Zeta-Jones	6:04
2.	"Funny Honey"	Kander and Ebb	Renée Zellweger	3:39
3.	"When You're Good to Mama"	Kander and Ebb	Queen Latifah	3:19
4.	"Cell Block Tango"	Kander and Ebb	Zeta-Jones, Susan Misner, Denise Faye, Deidre Goodwin, Ekaterina Chtchelkanova and Mýa Harrison	7:22
5.	"All I Care About"	Kander and Ebb	Richard Gere	3:48
6.	"We Both Reached for the Gun"	Kander and Ebb	Gere and Christine Baranski	3:59
7.	"Roxie"	Kander and Ebb	Zellweger	3:22
8.	"I Can't Do It Alone"	Kander and Ebb	Zeta-Jones	3:51
9.	"Mister Cellophane"	Kander and Ebb	John C. Reilly	3:57
10.	"Razzle Dazzle"	Kander and Ebb	Gere	3:47
11.	"Class^{[a]}"	Kander and Ebb	Zeta-Jones and Latifah	2:54
12.	"Nowadays"	Kander and Ebb	Zellweger	2:14
13.	"Nowadays/Hot Honey Rag"	Kander and Ebb	Zellweger and Zeta-Jones	3:28
14.	"I Move On^{[b]}"	Kander and Ebb	Zellweger and Zeta-Jones	4:00
15.	"After Midnight"	Danny Elfman	instrumental	3:24
16.	"Roxie's Suite"	Elfman	instrumental	3:58
17.	"Cell Block Tango/He Had It Comin'^{[c]}"	Kander and Ebb	Latifah, Lil' Kim and Macy Gray	3:40
18.	"Love Is a Crime^{[c]}^{[d]}"	Greg Lawson, Denise Rich, Damon Sharpe and Ric Wake	Anastacia	3:21
Total length:				69:44

- ^a "Class" was filmed but cut from the final editing of the movie. The footage was later included on the DVD release and in the film's broadcast television premiere on NBC in 2005
- ^b "I Move On" is a song which Kander and Ebb wrote directly for the film adaptation, thus is not featured on the original Broadway musical.
- ^c Songs not featured in the film, bonus tracks.
- ^d A music video was released for the song but it was never officially released as a CD single for a worldwide market, as promoting it would have been impossible due to the singer's recently announced battle with breast cancer at that time. When Anastacia was shooting the video she had a 40 °C (104 °F) degree fever.
- ^c The song Roxie was featured in the Korean drama Come Back Mister!

=== Differences from the musical ===
- The songs "A Little Bit Of Good", "I Can't Do It Alone (Reprise)", "My Own Best Friend", "I Know A Girl", "Me and My Baby", "When Velma Takes The Stand", "Class", and "Finale" were cut from the Film, however most were repurposed in some way (such as the instrumental of "Me and My Baby" playing during its replacing scene).
- The Preface announced by a chorus member, heard at the start of the Overture was cut.
- The dialogue between Fred and Roxie heard at different points during "All That Jazz", with some of the lines repurposed as a scene after the end of the number.
- Some of Amos' speech during "Funny Honey" were cut from the song, instead stated before and after the number.
- "Cell Block Tango", and "When You're Good To Mama" were swapped in the runtime due to narrative changes.
- The song "Nowadays" and "Hot Honey Rag" appear together on the soundtrack.
- The song "Nowadays" has been changed by shortening Roxie and Velma's performance of the song and instead replacing it with Roxie auditioning with the song.
- The Finale has been cut, with elements of Roxie and Velma's speech being retained. However, at the end they only reprise the final phrase of "All That Jazz" instead of the entire last verse.

== Awards ==
- The album won the 2004 Grammy Award for Best Compilation Soundtrack Album for a Motion Picture, Television or Other Visual Media and was nominated for Best Song Written for a Motion Picture, Television or Other Visual Media
- The song "I Move On" was nominated for an Academy Award for Best Original Song
- The song "Cell Block Tango" won a Florida Film Critics Circle Award for Best Song
- The song "Love Is a Crime" was nominated for a Satellite Award for Best Original Song
- The song "All That Jazz" singing by Catherine Zeta-Jones and Renée Zellweger appears in AFI's 100 Years...100 Songs list on 98th place

== Chart performance ==
=== Weekly charts ===
Chart (2002–2003)	Peak position
Australian Albums (ARIA)	3
Austrian Albums (Ö3 Austria)	17
Belgian Albums (Ultratop Flanders)	17
Belgian Albums (Ultratop Wallonia)	24
Canadian Albums (Billboard)	5
Dutch Albums (Album Top 100)	86
French Albums (SNEP)	28
German Albums (Offizielle Top 100)	35
Hungarian Albums (MAHASZ)	13
New Zealand Albums (RMNZ)	13
Norwegian Albums (VG-lista)	35
Swiss Albums (Schweizer Hitparade)	39
US Billboard 200	2
US Soundtrack Albums (Billboard)	1

=== Year-end charts ===
Chart (2003)	Position
Australian Albums (ARIA)	42
New Zealand Albums (RMNZ)	49
US Billboard 200	25
US Soundtrack Albums (Billboard)	2
Worldwide Albums (IFPI)	30

Chart (2004)	Position
US Soundtrack Albums (Billboard)	23

== Certifications ==
Region	Certification	Certified units/sales
Australia (ARIA)	Platinum	70,000^{^}
New Zealand (RMNZ)	Gold	7,500^{^}
United States (RIAA)	2× Platinum	2,000,000^{^}
^{^} Shipments figures based on certification alone.
