= Heavy Rotation (Anastacia album) =

Studio album by Anastacia
- Released: October 24, 2008
- Recorded: April–August 2008
- Studios: 2nd Floor Studios (Los Angeles, California); The Barn (Los Angeles, California); Chalice Recording Studios (Los Angeles, California); Westlake Recording Studios (Los Angeles, California); The Carrington House (Atlanta, Georgia); Henson Recording Studios (Hollywood, California); The Ice Box (Burbank, California)
- Genres: Pop; soul; R&B; funk
- Length: 40:52
- Labels: Mercury; Island Def Jam
- Producers: Guy Chambers; Andrew Frampton; Chuck Harmony; The Heavyweights; Rodney "Darkchild" Jerkins; Lester Mendez; Ne-Yo; REO; J.R. Rotem

Anastacia chronology
Pieces of a Dream (2005)	Heavy Rotation (2008)	It's a Man's World (2012)

Singles from Heavy Rotation
- 1. "I Can Feel You" Released: October 10, 2008; 2. "Absolutely Positively" Released: February 28, 2009; 3. "Defeated" Released: May 5, 2009

Heavy Rotation is the fourth studio album by American singer Anastacia. It was released on October 24, 2008 by Mercury Records. It is her first studio album in over four years, since her eponymous third studio album. According to Anastacia, the album title has a deeper meaning to it, referring to the fact that life rotates and you get through the "heavy" things. In the United States, Heavy Rotation was released on February 17, 2009 in digital format only, including three reworked tracks and the bonus track "Naughty".

The album failed to match the commercial success of its predecessors, struggling in the music charts and regarded as 'chasing sales' by Anastacia's label in an attempt to achieve a successful comeback. The singer herself later stressed her regret in the label's creative direction and stated that she would return to the sound of her previous projects on later albums. The album was ranked at number 10 by Billboard magazine's online "Readers' Poll: 10 Best Albums of 2008".

== Background and recording ==
Heavy Rotation marked Anastacia's first studio album on her new record deal with The Island Def Jam Music Group and Mercury Records since her departure from Daylight and Epic Records following the release of her 2005 compilation album Pieces of a Dream. Initially scheduled for an earlier release, her next project was pushed back because of ongoing negotiations with the record labels. In the album's liner notes, she also commented: "It's been such a fast album I had no idea of what it was going to sound like, what I was going to say. I figured there would be a couple of love songs, but I didn't realise that most of the album was going to be as happy as it is. Even the songs I didn't write myself, that I chose, are all positive."

Comparing it to previous efforts, Anastacia noted it a breakaway from her style: "The music feels different to the Anastacia. This album is more soulful. I feel more in touch with my inner self, my inner soul. I feel like I've come out of the other side of it all now, and found real peace. I've realised that life doesn't have to be controlled by me, in every way. And it's been fun, letting go, realising I don't have to be such a perfectionist." Initially scheduled for an earlier release, Heavy Rotation was pushed back because of ongoing negotiations with the record labels. When asked about the meaning of the title, she explained: "I called the album Heavy Rotation because it's a phrase that originated with DJs, and also for me the meaning is, life can be heavy, but it all turns around and goes into something else. It seemed to be the perfect title for where I'm at in my life."

== Concept ==
On October 7, 2008, previews to three songs, including "Absolutely Positively", "Defeated", and "Heavy Rotation", were posted on Anastacia's official MySpace page. Anastacia has said in an interview with her Austrian fan club that her favourite song on the album is "Heavy Rotation".

Taken from: "I'd say this album is a softer piece of me, a gentler side, even a more feminine side. I've come into embracing my sensuality as a woman, finally. I'm like wine. It's taken a while, but my reserve is quite popular right now! I'm just really happy inside, and I think that's reflected in the music. Sometimes that comes with age, and sometimes just with what you've experienced in your life. So both of them together are why this is going to be an exciting record for me to promote. It's very thrilling, to have so many new chances, new opportunities.." Previews to all songs on the album were posted on Anastacia's German website on October 17, 2008.

== Critical reception ==
Professional ratings
Aggregate scores
Source	Rating
Metacritic	66/100
Review scores
Source	Rating
AllMusic	4/5 stars
Daily Mirror	3/5 stars
Digital Spy	2/5 stars
The Guardian	3/5 stars
The Independent	2/5 stars
Virgin Media	3/5 stars

Heavy Rotation received generally positive reviews from music critics. At Metacritic, which assigns a normalized rating out of 100 to reviews from mainstream critics, the album received an average score of 66, which indicates "generally favorable reviews", based on 4 reviews. On September 3, 2008, Anastacia hosted an album listening party at the Bureau Club in Soho, London. On September 9, 2008, Capital 95.8 posted a review of that listening party, saying that Heavy Rotation is one of her strongest and most varied albums to date. MSN reviewed the album at the listening party in London and felt that "The album does sound a bit like a box-ticking exercise but the first half in particular is a reminder of what made Anastacia a big name in the first place - namely, that huge voice - and it's well worth a listen." AllMusic critic Jon O'Brien gave the album four stars (out of five) and stated: "Heavy Rotation, her first studio album in nearly five years, tones down the guitars in favor of a more eclectic collection of songs that take in everything from glossy soul-funk to acoustic pop and even techno. [...] But despite its occasional lapses into schmaltz and generic R&B, Heavy Rotation is still a charming and versatile record that has her unmistakable voice and personality stamped all over it."

Maddy Costa from The Guardian gave the album a mixed review: "This album's notion of femininity is hardcore feminist: it's packed with I Will Survive-type anthems designed to get women dancing around handbags. They are exhausting to listen to, but so radiant with positivity it's hard to dislike them." Alex Fletcher from Digital Spy was less impressed with the album: "Whether those who bought Anastacia's first three albums will be charmed by her fourth remains to be seen [...] For everyone else, however, Heavy Rotation will be too cringe-inducing to bear the repeated listens that its title promises." The Daily Mirror called Heavy Rotation "A class act at the top of her game." The Australian newspaper The Independent Weekly was also impressed with the album, giving it a favourable review: "Heavy Rotation is a triumphant return for an amazing artist who has travelled through pain to emerge stronger than ever before." BBC Music concluded about the album: "In summary: this is one happy Anastacia. Gone are the dark tracks of previous album Anastacia, replaced by soft ballads and upbeat disco stormers. Life on the sunny side is obviously doing her good, as is her partnership with Guy Chambers. Long may it continue – even, dare we say it, in heavy rotation".

== Singles ==
"I Can Feel You" was released as the album's lead single in October 2008. The music video was directed by Chris Applebaum and filmed in Los Angeles. In December 2008, the video for "I Can Feel You" ranked at #40 on VH1 Europe's "Final Countdown: 100 Best Videos of 2008".

The second single, "Absolutely Positively", was confirmed by Anastacia on This Morning on Monday, November 3, 2008, and was subsequently released in February 2009. The video was shot in London and directed by Nigel Dick, who also directed her videos for "I'm Outta Love" and "Cowboys & Kisses".

The third single, "Defeated", was released in May 2009, but served as promotional single only, without a music video or physical single release.

== Promotion ==
From September to November 2008, Anastacia made several radio and TV appearances in Europe to promote her new album. The album will also be promoted with her upcoming 2009 Heavy Rotation Tour. On September 29, 2008, Anastacia opened the Operation Triumph, a Serbian music talent show, performing two songs, "Left Outside Alone" and the lead single from Heavy Rotation, "I Can Feel You". On October 20, Anastacia performed "I Can Feel You" on the Spanish show Mira Quien Baila. She appeared on the UK chat show The Graham Norton Show on October 23. Anastacia appeared on GMTV October 28 and performed "I Can Feel You" at the "Pink Ribbon Gala" in Stockholm. On October 31, she gave an interview on the UK day time show Loose Women. Anastacia performed at G-A-Y nightclub on November 1. The show took place in the club's new venue, "Heaven", in central London. Anastacia made an appearance on This Morning on November 3 to promote her new album, where she also announced the second single from Heavy Rotation, "Absolutely Positively". On November 6, Anastacia presented an award along with Michael Owen at the 2008 MTV Europe Music Awards held in Liverpool. Anastacia attended the 2008 World Music Awards in Monte Carlo on November 9, where she performed "Absolutely Positively". On November 15, Anastacia performed on "I Can Feel You" on the Italian television show Serata D'onore. On November 23, Anastacia appeared at the "Divas II" benefit concert along with many other female artists, which aired on ITV1. Anastacia performed "Left Outside Alone" and "I Can Feel You".

She performed "I Can Feel You", "Left Outside Alone", "Absolutely Positively", and "I'm Outta Love" at "Energy Stars for Free 2008", a benefit concert in Zurich, on November 28. She was invited as a guest on the Paul O'Grady Show on December 9, where she also performed "Absolutely Positively". Anastacia performed "I'm Outta Love", "Left Outside Alone" and "I Can Feel You" on 95.8 Capital FM's Jingle Bell Ball on December 10, 2008. The concert took place at The O_{2} arena in London. On Friday December 12, 2008 she performed "Absolutely Positively", "I'm Outta Love" and "Left Outside Alone" in Madrid, at the Los Premios 40 Principales 2008. On December 13, Anastacia performed "I Can Feel You" on the television show Wetten, dass..? in Stuttgart, Germany. Anastacia performed "I Can Feel You" and "I'm Outta Love" at the ChildLine Concert in Dublin on December 16, 2008 which then went on to be televised in Ireland on December 19. Anastacia received the World Artist Award at the Women's World Awards on March 5, 2009 in Vienna where she also performed "I'm Outta Love" and "Defeated". The television special was broadcast in over 40 countries all over the world. Anastacia performed "Absolutely Positively" on the Italian version of X Factor on March 9, 2009. During her stay in Italy, she also appeared on Quelli che il calcio e... where she performed "Defeated" which was broadcast on Rai Due.

== Track listing ==
Heavy Rotation track listing
No.	Title	Writer(s)	Producer(s)	Length
1.	"I Can Feel You"	Chuck Harmony; Shaffer Smith	Harmony; Ne-Yo^{[a]}	3:49
2.	"The Way I See It"	Anastacia; Jack Kugell; Jamie Jones; Jason Pennock; Andrew Frampton; D'Myreo Mitchell	The Heavyweights; Frampton; REO; Lester Mendez	3:28
3.	"Absolutely Positively"	Harmony; Smith	Harmony; Ne-Yo^{[a]}	4:20
4.	"Defeated"	Anastacia; J.R. Rotem; Damon Sharpe	J.R. Rotem	3:55
5.	"In Summer"	Anastacia; Guy Chambers; Rico Love	Harmony	4:05
6.	"Heavy Rotation"	Rodney Jerkins; Frankie Storm	Rodney "Darkchild" Jerkins	3:26
7.	"Same Song"	Anastacia; Chambers	Mendez	3:56
8.	"I Call It Love"	Anastacia; Kugell; Jones; Pennock; Frampton	The Heavyweights; Frampton; REO	3:37
9.	"All Fall Down"	Anastacia; Chambers	Mendez	3:06
10.	"Never Gonna Love Again"	Anastacia; Chambers	Harmony	3:32
11.	"You'll Be Fine"	Anastacia; Mendez; Sharpe	Mendez	3:38
Total length:				40:52

UK and Australian edition bonus track
No.	Title	Writer(s)	Producer(s)	Length
12.	"Beautiful Messed Up World"	Anastacia; Kugell; Jones; Pennock; Frampton; Mitchell	The Heavyweights; Frampton; REO	3:09
Total length:				44:01

iTunes Store bonus tracks
No.	Title	Writer(s)	Producer(s)	Length
13.	"Naughty"	Anastacia; Mendez; Sharpe	Mendez	3:33
14.	"Interview"			5:59
Total length:				53:33

US digital standard edition
No.	Title	Writer(s)	Producer(s)	Length
1.	"Beautiful Messed Up World"	Anastacia; Kugell; Jones; Pennock; Frampton; Mitchell	The Heavyweights	3:09
2.	"The Way I See It"	Anastacia; Kugell; Jones; Pennock; Frampton; Mitchell	The Heavyweights; Frampton; REO; Mendez	3:28
3.	"Defeated"	Anastacia; Rotem; Sharpe	Rotem	3:55
4.	"In Summer"	Anastacia; Chambers; Love	Harmony	4:05
5.	"Heavy Rotation"	Jerkins; Storm	Jerkins	3:26
6.	"Absolutely Positively"	Harmony; Smith	Harmony; Ne-Yo^{[a]}	4:20
7.	"Same Song"	Anastacia; Chambers	Mendez	3:56
8.	"You'll Be Fine"	Anastacia; Mendez; Sharpe	Mendez	3:38
9.	"I Can Feel You"	Harmony; Smith	Harmony; Ne-Yo^{[a]}	3:50
10.	"I Call It Love"	Anastacia; Kugell; Jones; Pennock; Frampton	The Heavyweights; Frampton; REO	3:37
11.	"Never Gonna Love Again"	Anastacia; Chambers	Harmony	3:32
Total length:				40:56

US digital deluxe edition bonus tracks
No.	Title	Writer(s)	Producer(s)	Length
12.	"All Fall Down"	Anastacia; Chambers	Mendez	3:06
13.	"Naughty"	Anastacia; Mendez; Sharpe	Mendez	3:33
14.	"Absolutely Positively" (Moto Blanco radio mix)	Harmony; Smith	Harmony; Ne-Yo^{[a]}; Moto Blanco^{[b]}	3:35
15.	"I Can Feel You" (Mousse T. remix)	Harmony; Smith	Harmony; Ne-Yo^{[a]}; Mousse T.^{[b]}	3:25
16.	"I Can Feel You" (Max Sanna & Steve Pitron club mix)	Harmony; Smith	Harmony; Ne-Yo^{[a]}; Sanna^{[b]}; Pitron^{[b]}	7:51
17.	"I Can Feel You" (music video)			3:41
Total length:				65:07

Notes

- ^{^a} signifies a co-producer
- ^{^b} signifies a remixer

== Charts ==
=== Weekly charts ===
Weekly chart performance for Heavy Rotation
Chart (2008)	Peak position
Australian Albums (ARIA)	47
Austrian Albums (Ö3 Austria)	6
Belgian Albums (Ultratop Flanders)	43
Belgian Albums (Ultratop Wallonia)	39
Czech Albums (ČNS IFPI)	17
Danish Albums (Hitlisten)	31
European Albums (Billboard)	6
Dutch Albums (Album Top 100)	15
Finnish Albums (Suomen virallinen lista)	30
French Albums (SNEP)	60
German Albums (Offizielle Top 100)	13
Greek Albums (IFPI)	7
Hungarian Albums (MAHASZ)	31
Irish Albums (IRMA)	45
Italian Albums (FIMI)	6
Norwegian Albums (VG-lista)	28
Portuguese Albums (AFP)	21
Scottish Albums (Official Charts)	15
Spanish Albums (Promusicae)	3
Swedish Albums (Sverigetopplistan)	15
Swiss Albums (Schweizer Hitparade)	3
UK Albums (Official Charts)	17

=== Year-end charts ===
Year-end chart performance for Heavy Rotation
Chart (2008)	Position
Greek Albums (IFPI)	24
Italian Albums (FIMI)	99
Swiss Albums (Schweizer Hitparade)	65

== Certifications and sales ==
Certifications for Heavy Rotation
Region	Certification	Certified units/sales
Italy sales in 2008	—	55,000
Russia (NFPF)	Gold	10,000^{*}
Sweden (GLF)	Gold	20,000^{^}
Switzerland (IFPI Switzerland)	Gold	15,000^{^}
^{*} Sales figures based on certification alone.^{^} Shipments figures based on certification alone.

== Release history ==
Release dates and formats for Heavy Rotation
Region	Date	Format	Edition	Label	Ref.
Germany	October 24, 2008	CD; digital download	Standard	Universal	
Italy	October 24, 2008	CD; digital download	Standard	Universal	
Netherlands	October 24, 2008	CD; digital download	Standard	Universal	
Australia	October 25, 2008	CD; digital download	Standard	Universal	
France	October 27, 2008	CD; digital download	Standard	Universal	
United Kingdom	October 27, 2008	CD; digital download	Standard	Mercury	
United States	February 17, 2009	Digital download	Standard; deluxe	Mercury	
