= Resurrection (Anastacia album) =

Studio album by Anastacia
- Released: May 2, 2014
- Genre: Pop; rock; soul; R&B
- Length: 36:33
- Label: Sanctuary; BMG
- Producer: Louis Biancaniello; Michael Biancaniello; John Fields; Toby Gad; Alex Geringas; Jamie Hartman; Joachim Schluter; Sam Watters; Bill Malina

Anastacia chronology
It's a Man's World (2012)	Resurrection (2014)	Ultimate Collection (2015)

Singles from Resurrection
- 1. "Stupid Little Things" Released: April 4, 2014; 2. "Staring at the Sun" Released: August 25, 2014; 3. "Lifeline" Released: September 5, 2014 (Italy)

Resurrection is the sixth studio album by American recording artist Anastacia released in May 2014. The record is her first album of original material in nearly five and a half years and was primarily written and recorded during Anastacia's second experience of breast cancer. The album proved to a commercial success in Europe entering the top five in Italy, Germany, Spain and Switzerland and the top ten in the Dutch and UK charts.

== Background ==
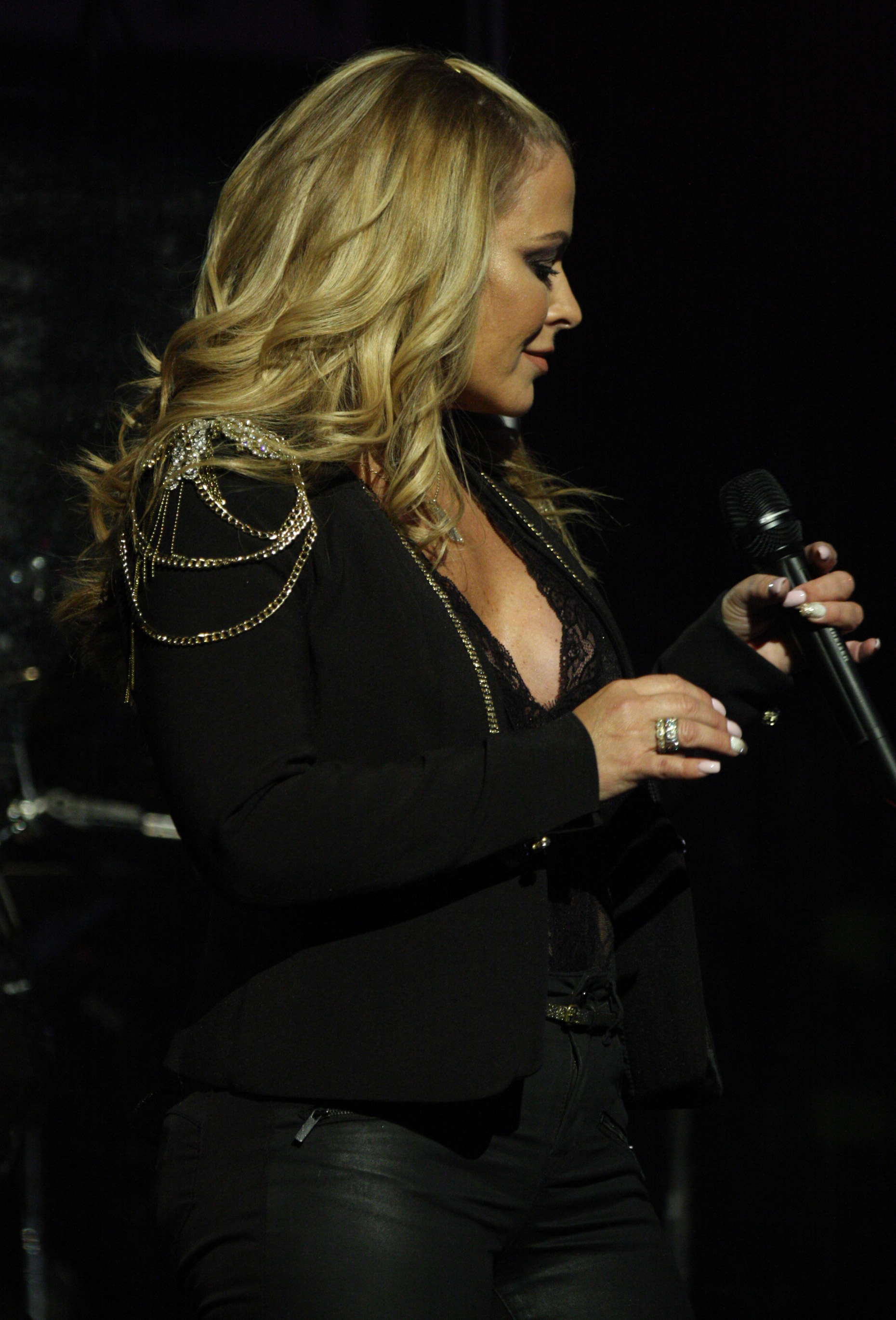
Anastacia performing on The Resurrection Tour (2015) in Sydney, Australia

The album's title Resurrection refers to the artist's recovery from breast cancer and a return to the "sprock" sound (hybrid of soul, pop and rock) the singer became known for in 2004. The recording sessions for the album began in early 2013. The title also refers to the meaning of her name in Greek, Anastasia. During the recording of the song "Pendulum" she was informed of her second cancer diagnosis.

The lead single "Stupid Little Things" was written by Sam Watters and Louis Biancaniello, with whom she has had a long-standing collaborative partnership. The song received a positive reception with MTV's Brad Stern including it in his 5 Must-Hear Pop Songs of the Week!. For the album also continued working with the producer and songwriter Jamie Hartman, including the song "Stay" that refers to her personal circumstances at the time. Other collaborators included the musician John Fields, producer Toby Gadd and songwriter Steve Diamond.

She wrote the song "Pendulum" of her divorce from Wayne Newton in 2007, saying: "It's totally about the loss of my marriage, but it's a beautiful song. I think I lost a bit of myself for a while. My career got so busy I'd be thinking: 'Who the hell I am?'"

The deluxe edition in a hardback book format contains a second CD with four additional tracks that includes "Left Outside Alone, Part 2" – a re-recording of a previous hit single.

== Promotion ==
Anastacia embarked on a European promotional tour in support of "Stupid Little Things". At the start of October 2014, she embarked on her third headlining tour, the Resurrection Tour. A second single "Staring at the Sun" was released in September of that same year, with two music videos, one for the album version and one for a Digital Dog Remix. while the radio-only single "Lifeline" was released in Italy with a music video recorded live on tour with Italian singer Kekko (from Modà) titled "Lifeline / Luce Per Sempre".

== Critical reception ==
Professional ratings
Review scores
Source	Rating
Click Music	4/5 stars
Entertainment Focus	3/5 stars
Female First	4/5 stars
laut.de	3/5 stars

Daniel Falconer, writing for Female First, felt that the album was "not only a testament to Anastacia's talent, but her willingness to conquer and "rise from the ashes". She deserves to regain that major success she's seen in the past, offering an album that reeks of pure honesty, experience and above all, triumph." In his review for laut.de, Kai Butterweck wrote: "In great voice and delivering her usual broad mainstream packages, Anastacia returns—at times quite impressively—from the realm of those already written off with her sixth studio album. Respect."

Marcus Floyd from Renowned for Sound noted that "perhaps there were one too many ballads on the album, and perhaps an extra song or two could have been included, but when an album has a true concept the songs are written and completed the way they present themselves; Resurrection stayed true to itself and to Anastacia’s vision, it couldn't be more of a suitable comeback album for somebody so loved by many." Pip Ellwood-Hughes of Entertainment Focus found that Resurrection was a "welcome return for Anastacia" and called it a "solid effort from the personality-filled diva with the big voice. There are moments of magic on the album but unfortunately the lack of variety means that on occasion the tracks segue into one another."

== Track listing ==
Resurrection track listing
No.	Title	Writer(s)	Producer(s)	Length
1.	"Staring at the Sun"	Louis Biancaniello; Marley Munroe; Sam Watters	The Runaways	3:43
2.	"Lifeline"	Phil Bentley; Jamie Hartman; Shelly Peiken	Hartman	4:02
3.	"Stupid Little Things"	Anastacia; L. Biancaniello; Michael Biancaniello; Courtney Harrell; Watters	The Runaways	3:55
4.	"I Don't Want to Be the One"	L. Biancaniello; Munroe; Watters	The Runaways	3:59
5.	"Evolution"	Anastacia; Steve Diamond; John Fields	Fields	3:23
6.	"Pendulum"	Anastacia; Hartman	Hartman	3:30
7.	"Stay"	Anastacia; Hartman; Charlie Midnight	Hartman	3:26
8.	"Dark White Girl"	Anastacia; Diamond; Fields	John Fields	3:23
9.	"Apology"	Anastacia; Fields; Hartman	Hartman	3:32
10.	"Broken Wings"	Anastacia; Toby Gad; Damon Sharpe	Gad	3:37
Total length:				36:33

Deluxe edition
No.	Title	Writer(s)	Producer(s)	Length
11.	"Other Side of Crazy"	Anastacia; Hartman; Andy Stochansky	Hartman	3:49
12.	"Oncoming Train"	Alex Geringas; Nicky Holland	Geringas; Joachim Schluter^{[a]}	3:08
13.	"Resurrection"	Anastacia; Diamond; Fields	Fields	3:51
14.	"Left Outside Alone, Part 2"	Anastacia; Glen Ballard; Dallas Austin	Bill Malina	3:53

iTunes bonus track
No.	Title	Writer(s)	Producer(s)	Length
15.	"Underdog"	Anastacia; Diamond; Fields	Fields	2:57
Total length:				54:14

Notes

- ^{^[a]} signifies a co-producer

== Charts ==
=== Weekly charts ===
Weekly chart performance for Resurrection
Chart (2014)	Peak position
Austrian Albums (Ö3 Austria)	11
Belgian Albums (Ultratop Flanders)	45
Belgian Albums (Ultratop Wallonia)	21
Czech Albums (ČNS IFPI)	16
Dutch Albums (Album Top 100)	7
Finnish Albums (Suomen virallinen lista)	38
French Albums (SNEP)	24
German Albums (Offizielle Top 100)	5
Italian Albums (FIMI)	5
Portuguese Albums (AFP)	18
Scottish Albums (OCC)	12
Spanish Albums (Promusicae)	12
Swiss Albums (Schweizer Hitparade)	5
UK Albums (OCC)	9
UK Album Downloads (OCC)	18
UK Independent Albums (OCC)	2

=== Year-end charts ===
Year-end chart performance for Resurrection
Chart (2014)	Position
Italian Albums (FIMI)	66
