= I Can Feel You =

Single by Anastacia

from the album Heavy Rotation
- B-side: "In Summer"
- Released: August 21, 2008
- Studio: The Carrington House (Atlanta, Georgia)
- Length: 3:50 (album version); 3:30 (radio edit)
- Label: Mercury
- Songwriters: Shaffer Smith; Chuck Harmony
- Producer: Chuck Harmony

Anastacia singles chronology
"I Belong to You (Il Ritmo della Passione)" (2006)	"I Can Feel You" (2008)	"Absolutely Positively" (2009)

Music video
- "Anastacia - I Can Feel You" on YouTube

"I Can Feel You" is a song by American pop singer-songwriter Anastacia. It was written by Ne-Yo and Chuck Harmony and produced by the latter for her fourth studio album, Heavy Rotation (2008). Her first new material in over three years, the dance pop song was released by Mercury Records as the album's lead single in October 2008. It became a top ten hit on the Slovak Rádio – Top 100 chart and reached the top 20 in Austria, Hungary, Italy, and Sweden.

== Background ==
"I Can Feel You" was written by American R&B singer Ne-Yo and commissioned after her record company had suggested a more "urban dance" sound for her fourth studio album, Heavy Rotation. Commenting on his contribution, Anastacia elaborated in 2009: "I really didn't want to get turned down. I think the worst feeling would be asking someone to write a song for you and them to turn round and say: "No." So I was so grateful that he knew who I was and then the fact that he wrote two songs. The first tune he wrote, "I Can Feel You" was hands down like the perfect song that reflected how I was feeling about my life and my love life. It's been lovely working with him. He is a really charming and down to earth guy." In 2017, Anastacia admitted in an interview with Attitude that the song "just wasn't my vibe."

== Critical reception ==
This song received mixed to negative reviews. In his album review album the song's parent album, Alex Fletcher from Digital Spy wrote: "Make Anastacia relevant to the generation brought up on Amy Winehouse and The Pussycat Dolls rather than Mariah and Whitney. The low-key disco" of lead single "I Can Feel You" decent indication of Anastacia's intentions." He also compared the song to that time recent Britney Spears singles. Fletcher's colleague, Nick Levine reviewed the single: "Sadly, 'I Can Feel You' isn't the big comeback single she needs after what in pop terms is a fairly lengthy hiatus. It begins promisingly with a lightly funky disco groove, but the chorus lacks the oomph that turned "Left Outside Alone" and "I'm Outta Love" into radio favourites."

Allmusic editor Jon O'Brien also disked the single release of the song: "Lead single "I Can Feel You" misleadingly suggests that this doesn't seem like a particularly wise decision. Written by man of the moment Ne-Yo, its promising opening funky beats and squelchy synths are let down by such a non-event of a chorus that it's hard to believe it's penned by the same man behind Rihanna's recent infectious chart hits. A prime example of using a star name just for the sake of it, it's arguably the most underwhelming comeback song of the year." Ian Gittins of Virgin Media praised vocal performance: "Her asbestos larynx is in full effect on Heavy Rotation, rasping through R&B-hued lead-off single "I Can Feel You."

== Music video ==
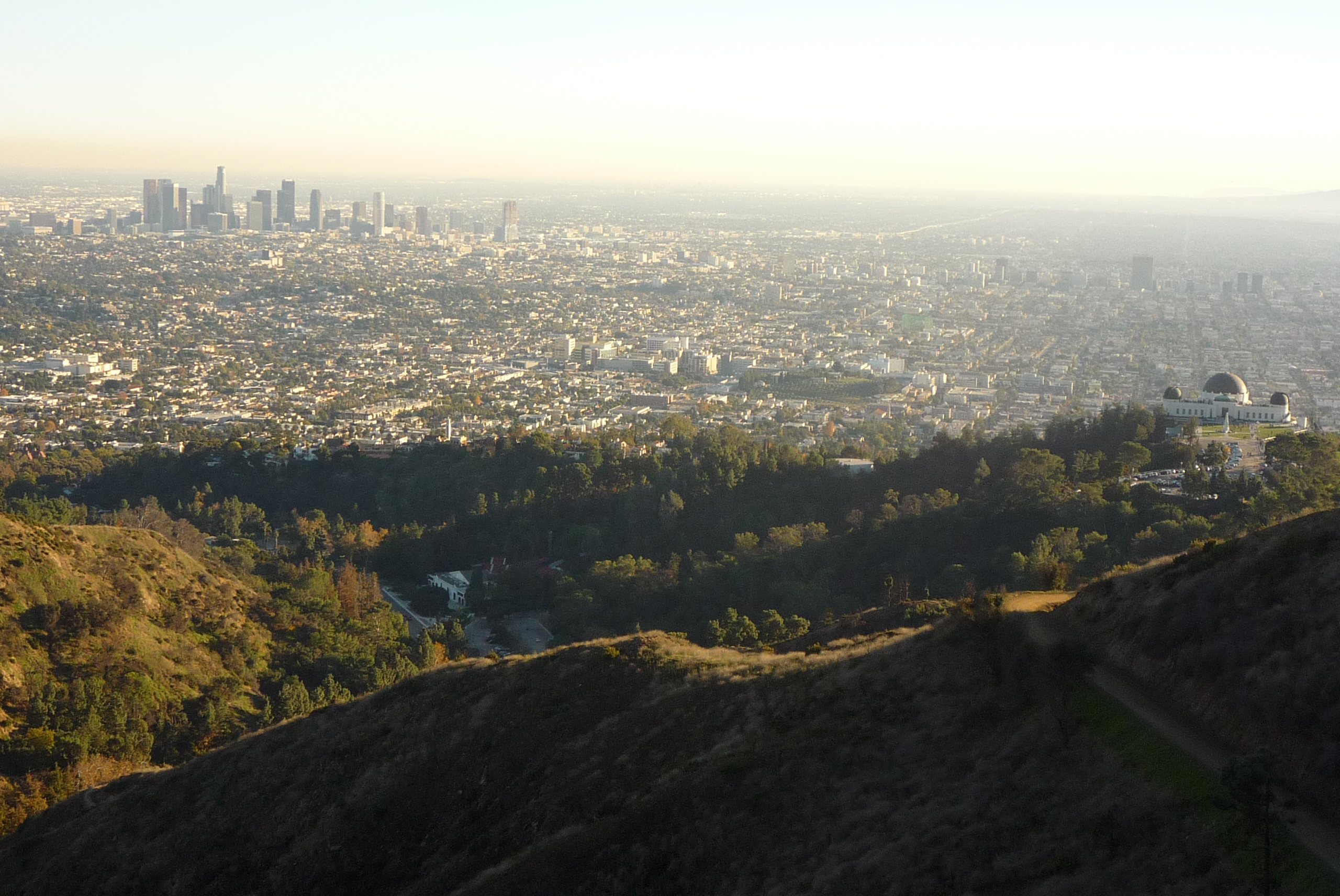
"I Can Feel You" was directed by Chris Applebaum and filmed in a studio in Los Angeles.

A music video for "I Can Feel You" was directed by Chris Applebaum and filmed in Los Angeles. It consists of Anastacia in four different settings, having no real concept. The first is Anastacia in a smoky alley wearing a silver dress, dancing and hopping around. The second is the singer in black leather pants, laying on a chair, surrounded by green lights. The third setting includes Anastacia fully naked in a bathtub, covering her breasts with her hands and arms. The final setting shows her wearing a second silver dress and a huge feather boa, dancing and singing in front of a wall. These four settings are intertwined with backstage footage of the videoshoot, including footage of Anastacia's husband, sister and her dogs. The final clip had its official premiere on September 14, 2008.

== Promotion ==
Anastacia performed "I Can Feel You" in 2008 at the following events:

- on September 29 on Operacija trijumf ("Operation Triumph"), the Serbian version of Star Academy.
- on October 20 on ¡Mira quién baila!, the Spanish version of Dancing with the Stars.
- on October 28 at the "Pink Ribbon Gala" in Stockholm, Sweden.
- on November 25 on Serata d'Onore, an Italian TV show which aired on Rai Due.
- on November 23, at "Divas II", a benefit concert in England which aired on ITV1.
- on November 28 at "Energy Stars for Free 2008", a benefit concert in Zürich, Switzerland.
- at 95.8 Capital FM's Jingle Bell Ball on December 10. The concert took place at The O_{2} arena in London.
- on December 31 at the welcoming to the new year in Spain.
- at the popular TV show Wetten, dass..? in Stuttgart, Germany, on December 13.
- at the Cheerios ChildLine Concert in Dublin, Ireland, on 16 December.

== Track listing ==
International CD single
No.	Title	Writer(s)	Producer(s)	Length
1.	"I Can Feel You" (album version)	Shaffer Smith; Chuck Harmony	Harmony	3:50
2.	"I Can Feel You" (Max Sanna & Steve Pitron Club Mix)	Smith; Harmony	Harmony; Max Sanna; Steve Pitron^{[A]}	7:54

International CD maxi-single
No.	Title	Writer(s)	Producer(s)	Length
1.	"I Can Feel You" (radio edit)	Smith; Harmony	Harmony	3:30
2.	"In Summer"	Anastacia Newkirk; Guy Chambers; Rico Love	Harmony; Damon Sharpe^{[A]}	4:07
3.	"I Can Feel You" (Max Sanna & Steve Pitron Club Mix)	Smith; Harmony	Harmony; Sanna; Pitron^{[A]}	7:54
4.	"I Can Feel You" (video)			3:40

Australian CD single
No.	Title	Writer(s)	Producer(s)	Length
1.	"I Can Feel You" (radio edit)	Smith; Harmony	Harmony	3:30
2.	"I Can Feel You" (Max Sanna & Steve Pitron Club Mix)	Smith; Harmony	Harmony; Sanna; Pitron^{[A]}	7:54
3.	"In Summer"	Newkirk; Chambers; Love	Harmony; Sharpe^{[A]}	4:07
4.	"I Can Feel You" (video edit)	Smith; Harmony	Harmony	3:40

German CD single
No.	Title	Writer(s)	Producer(s)	Length
1.	"I Can Feel You" (album version)	Smith; Harmony	Harmony	3:50
2.	"I Can Feel You" (instrumental)	Smith; Harmony	Harmony	3:48

UK 2-track promo CD single
No.	Title	Writer(s)	Producer(s)	Length
1.	"I Can Feel You" (radio edit)	Smith; Harmony	Harmony	3:31
2.	"I Can Feel You" (album version)	Smith; Harmony	Harmony	3:50

UK 5-track promo CD single
No.	Title	Writer(s)	Producer(s)	Length
1.	"I Can Feel You" (album version)	Smith; Harmony	Harmony	3:49
2.	"I Can Feel You" (Max Sanna & Steve Pitron radio edit)	Smith; Harmony	Harmony; Sanna; Pitron^{[A]}	3:34
3.	"I Can Feel You" (Max Sanna & Steve Pitron club mix)	Smith; Harmony	Harmony; Sanna; Pitron^{[A]}	7:54
4.	"I Can Feel You" (Max Sanna & Steve Pitron Radio Club)	Smith; Harmony	Harmony; Sanna; Pitron^{[A]}	3:33
5.	"I Can Feel You" (Mousse T. remix)	Smith; Harmony	Harmony; Mousse T.^{[A]}	3:26

Notes

- ^{^[A]} denotes additional producer
- ^{^[B]} denotes additional background vocal producer

== Credits and personnel ==
- Vocals: Anastacia
- Producers: Chuck Harmony
- Lead vocals produced by Sam Watters
- Recording: Chuck Harmony
- Mixing: Manny Marroquin at Larrabee Studios in Los Angeles, California
- Recorded at The Carrington House in Atlanta, Georgia

== Charts ==
=== Weekly charts ===
Weekly chart performance for "I Can Feel You"
Chart (2008–2009)	Peak position
Australia Physical Singles (ARIA)	31
Austria (Ö3 Austria Top 40)	20
Belgium (Ultratop 50 Flanders)	38
Belgium (Ultratop 50 Wallonia)	33
Czech Republic Airplay (ČNS IFPI)	57
Europe (European Hot 100 Singles)	54
Germany (GfK)	25
Hungary (Rádiós Top 40)	20
Italy (FIMI)	11
Netherlands (Dutch Top 40)	24
Netherlands (Single Top 100)	37
Slovakia Airplay (ČNS IFPI)	5
Sweden (Sverigetopplistan)	17
Switzerland (Schweizer Hitparade)	27
UK Singles (Official Charts)	67
UK Airplay Chart (Music Week)	29

=== Year-end charts ===
Year-end chart performance for "I Can Feel You"
Chart (2008)	Position
Hungary (Rádiós Top 40)	85
Chart (2009)	Position
Hungary (Rádiós Top 40)	103

== Release history ==
Release history for "I Can Feel You"
Region	Date	Label	Format	Ref.
Various	August 21, 2008	Mercury	Radio	
Europe	October 10, 2008	Mercury	CD single; digital download	
United Kingdom	October 13, 2008	Mercury	CD single; digital download	
