= Love Is a Crime =

Single by Anastacia

from the album Chicago: Music from the Miramax Motion Picture
- Released: January 18, 2003
- Recorded: 2002
- Length: 3:21
- Label: Epic Records; Daylight Records
- Songwriters: Greg Lawson; Denise Rich; Damon Sharpe; Rick Wake
- Producer: Greg Lawson

Anastacia singles chronology
"You'll Never Be Alone" (2002)	"Love Is a Crime" (2003)	"Left Outside Alone" (2004)

Music video
- "Love Is a Crime" on YouTube

"Love Is a Crime" is a song recorded by pop singer Anastacia for the soundtrack of the 2002 film Chicago, and released as the only single from it exclusively in America. A music video was released for the song, but it was never released worldwide, as the singer was ill with cancer at the time. The single managed to peak at number one on the U.S. Club Play Chart.

== Music videos ==
The music video for "Love Is a Crime" was directed by Matthew Rolston and shot on January 17, 2003 in New York. Anastacia shot the video even though she was ill, having a 40 °C (104 °F) fever.

The video has two main sequences: in the first, Anastacia is singing in a prison cell; in the second singer and dancers, all dressed as gangsters, dance in front of a large screen. Scenes from the movie Chicago are also shown in the music video.

An alternate version of the video is similar but include new scenes, from the same videoshoot, of Anastacia in a red outfit without her trademark glasses on. Also, the scenes where Anastacia and the dancers were dressed up as gangsters has its original green-screen background, rather than the blue-lit background in the original version.

== Track listing ==
1. "Love Is a Crime" [Album Version]
2. "Love Is a Crime" [Thunderpuss Club Mix]
3. "Love Is a Crime" [Thunderpuss Dub Mix]
4. "Love Is a Crime" [Thunderpuss Tribeapella]
5. "Love Is a Crime" [Cotto's Doin' the Crime Mix]
6. "Love Is a Crime" [Cotto's Luv Is a Dub]

== Charts ==
=== Weekly charts ===
Chart (2003)	Peak position
US Dance Club Songs (Billboard)	1
Poland (Polish Airplay Chart)	9

== See also ==
- List of number-one dance singles of 2003 (U.S.)
