= Defeated (Anastacia song) =

Single by Anastacia

from the album Heavy Rotation
- Released: March 23, 2009
- Length: 3:55
- Label: Mercury
- Songwriters: Anastacia Newkirk; J.R. Rotem; Damon Sharpe
- Producer: J.R. Rotem

Anastacia singles chronology
| "Absolutely Positively" (2009) | "Defeated" (2009) | "Stalemate" (2009) |

Audio
- "Defeated" on YouTube

"Defeated" is a song by American singer Anastacia. It was written by J.R. Rotem, Damon Sharpe, and Anastacia for her fourth studio album, Heavy Rotation (2008), while production was helmed by Rotem. The song was released as the album's third and final single in May 2009, preceded by a release to European radio on March 23, 2009.

== Critical reception ==
Mirror.co.uk wrote that Anastacia delivers some "lyrical howlers." Alex Fletcher of Digital Spy found that "lyrically, she never falters from her favourite subject of "standing up strong", even attempting to update "I Will Survive" for the noughties on "Defeated". "You can say that you won but I'll never believe it," she roars. "I can't be defeated!"."

== Track listing ==
- Digital Download
1. "Defeated" - 3:55

== Credits and personnel ==
- Lead vocals: Anastacia
- Background vocals: Anastacia, J.R. Rotem
- Producers: J.R. Rotem
- Co-Producers: Damon Sharpe
- Recorded by J.R. Rotem at The Carrington House in Atlanta, GA
- Vocals recorded by Bill Malina at Westlake Recording Studios in Los Angeles, CA

== Charts ==
=== Weekly charts ===
Weekly chart performance for "Defeated"
| Chart (2009) | Peak position |
|---|---|
| CIS Airplay (TopHit) | 11 |
| Czech Republic Airplay (ČNS IFPI) | 91 |
| Hungary (Rádiós Top 40) | 30 |
| Russia Airplay (TopHit) | 9 |

=== Year-end charts ===
2009 year-end chart performance for "Defeated"
| Chart (2009) | Position |
|---|---|
| CIS (TopHit) | 55 |
| Russia Airplay (TopHit) | 33 |

2010 year-end chart performance for "Defeated"
| Chart (2010) | Position |
|---|---|
| Russia Airplay (TopHit) | 150 |

== Release history ==
Release history for "Defeated"
| Region | Date | Format(s) | Label | Ref(s) |
|---|---|---|---|---|
| Europe | March 23, 2009 | Digital download | Universal | |
| Russia | June 30, 2009 | Contemporary hit radio | Universal | |
