= Army of Me (Christina Aguilera song) =

2012 song by Christina Aguilera

Song by Christina Aguilera

from the album Lotus
- Recorded: 2012
- Studio: Henson Recording Studios, Radley Studios
- Genre: Dance-pop; Eurodance
- Length: 3:26
- Label: RCA
- Songwriters: Christina Aguilera; Jamie Hartman; David Glass; Phil Bentley
- Producer: Tracklacers

Licensed audio
- "Army of Me" on YouTube

"Army of Me" is a song recorded by American singer-songwriter Christina Aguilera for her seventh studio album, Lotus (2012). It was co-written by Aguilera with Jamie Hartman, David Glass and Phil Bentley, with production done by Hartman and Tracklacers. Described by Aguilera as part two to her 2003 single "Fighter", she decided to record the song so that her newer, younger fans would have an empowering song to listen in case they were unfamiliar with her previous work. The song combines dance-pop and Eurodance genres; its instrumentation incorporates drum beats and rock guitars. "Army of Me" garnered mixed reviews from music critics. Many praised Aguilera's strong delivery of the song's message and branded it a potential single, while others criticized it for being too similar to "Fighter". Upon the release of Lotus, the song debuted on the South Korea international singles chart at number 103 with digital download sales of 2,689. Aguilera has performed the song at the 40th American Music Awards in the United States.

== Background and recording ==
Recorded at Henson Recording Studios, Hollywood, California, and Radley Studios, Los Angeles, California, by Justin Stanley, "Army of Me" was co-written by Aguilera with Jamie Hartman, David Glass and Phil Bentley. It was produced by Tracklacers and it was co-produced by Hartman. Aguilera's vocals were recorded by Oscar Ramirez at The Red Lips Room in Beverly Hills in California. Programming was carried out by Steve Daly and John Keep, while strings were composed by Hartman. In an interview with Andrew Hampp for Billboard, Aguilera explained how her role on The Voice has allowed her to reach a new generational audience who may not be familiar with her past work, including songs such as her 2002 single, "Fighter". When asked if some of the songs on Lotus feature themes which are similar to that of her 2002 album, Stripped, Aguilera responded by saying that "Army of Me" is what she describes as "Fighter 2.0".

Absolutely. There's a song called 'Army of Me,' which is sort of a 'Fighter 2.0.' There is a new generation of fans from a younger demographic that might not have been with me all the way but that watch me on the show now. I feel like every generation should be able to enjoy and have their piece of 'Fighter' within. This time, the way it musically came together it just felt right for this time and this generation. There's always going to be a fighter in me getting through some obstacle and some hurdle. All these 6-year-olds who know me from pushing my button and turning around in a big red chair who weren't around for the actual 'Fighter,' this is my chance to recharge it, rejuvenate it and do something modernized for them.

In her 2012 interview with The Advocate's Diane Anderson-Minshall Aguilera said that "Army of Me" is a song about "people that are maybe misunderstood or don’t fit into the norm but deserve a voice", and added that it is dedicated to them. She also noted that the song "embraces LGBTQ themes".

== Composition and lyrics ==
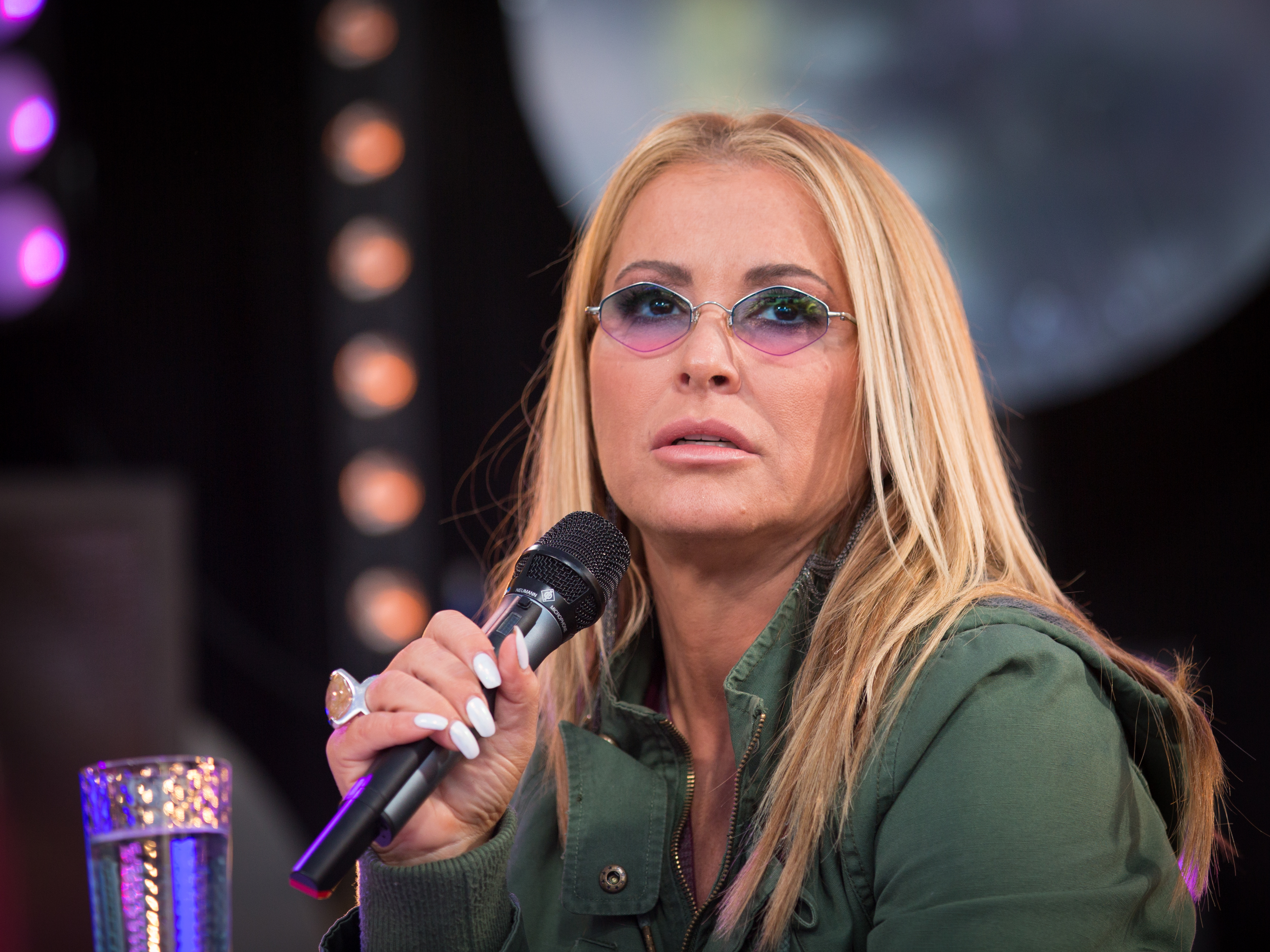
Three years after Lotus was released, the song was covered by Anastacia.

"Army of Me" is an up-tempo dance-pop and Eurodance song which lasts for a duration of 3:26 (three minutes and twenty-six seconds). Instrumentation consists of a "pounding" drum beat and "rocky" guitars. Aguilera presents herself as a fighter and tells her ex-boyfriend that she is stronger than he is in the lyrics "So how does it feel to know that I beat you?/ That I can defeat you?" Although Aguilera is heartbroken by the decision to split up with her ex-boyfriend, she is not a broken person. The lyrics "One of me is wiser/ One of me is stronger/ One of me's a fighter/ And there's a thousand faces of me/ We're gonna rise up for every time you broke me/ You're gonna face an army of me" are similar to those performed by Aguilera on "Fighter", although of "Army of Me" does not sample any of the song. Aguilera sings "Now that I'm wiser/ Now that I'm stronger/ Now that I'm a fighter/ There's a thousand faces on me" over a "thumping" beat, and belts the line "We're gonna rise up for every time you broke me" on the chorus. In 2015, the song was covered by recording artist Anastacia for her compilation album Ultimate Collection.

== Critical reception ==
"Army of Me" garnered mixed reviews from music critics. Diane Anderson-Minshall of Pride Media noted that the song "makes a great LGBT anthem." Andrew Hampp for Billboard and Chris Younie for 4Music both thought that "Army of Me" could have been a potential single, the latter of whom writing "This track must be a future single." Younie continued to write that the song "captivates and excites right from the very start", has a "euphoric" energy and is the type of "angry" pop song that Kelly Clarkson "would give her right arm for". Sarah Rodman of The Boston Globe described it as a "Gloria Gaynor-meets-Depeche Mode dance of anger." The A.V. Club's Annie Zaleski described Aguilera as a "playful" and "sassy techno diva" on "Army of Me".

Kitty Empire of The Observer thought that it shares similarities with "Fighter". She cited the Björk song of the same name as another influence, due to its "emotional territory". Robert Copsey for Digital Spy described the song as "nothing we haven't heard from her before, but there's an urgency to it that suggests Christina needed to get it out of her system", while Matthew Horton of Virgin Media wrote that Aguilera sounds as though she is declaring war. Michael Gallucci for PopCrush was critical of the song, writing that it sounds like a Cher disco song which features Aguilera "overworking" her vocal cords. Melissa Maerz of Entertainment Weekly found the song's lyrics to be defensive and bitter. Responding to the lyrics "And we're gonna rise up.../ For every time you wronged me/ Well, you're gonna face an army, army of me.' Maerz writes "Rise up against whom? Is the whole world really out to get her, or is this just an excuse to wear camouflage hot pants?"

== Live performances ==
Aguilera performed "Army of Me" for the first time at the 40th American Music Awards as part of a medley with two other tracks: "Lotus Intro" and "Let There Be Love" on November 18, 2012, held at the Nokia Theatre in Los Angeles, California. Bruna Nessif for E! Online described the performance as "interesting," and noted that the theme "to celebrate everyone for who they are" was similar to the moral content presented on Gaga's album Born This Way (2011).

== Credits and personnel ==
Recording

- Recorded at Henson Recording Studios, Hollywood, California; Radley Studios, Los Angeles, California.
- String, Bass and Piano recorded at Henson Recording Studios, Hollywood, California.
- Acoustic Guitars, Synth Piano and Synth Strings recorded at Radley Studios, Los Angeles, California.
- Vocals recorded at The Red Lips Room, Beverly Hills, California.

Personnel

- Songwriting – Christina Aguilera, Jamie Hartman, David Glass, Phil Bentley
- Production – Tracklacers, Jamie Hartman (co-producer)
- Vocal production – Christina Aguilera
- Vocal recording – Oscar Ramirez
- String arrangement – Jamie Hartman
- String, Bass and Piano recording – Justin Stanley
- Acoustic Guitars, Synth Piano and Synth Strings recording – Jamie Hartman
- Assistant – Zivi Krieger
- Drum programming, Keyboards and Synths – Steve Daly, Jon Keep
- Synth Strings – Jamie Hartman, The Professor
- Live Strings – Songa Lee, Rodney Wirtz, Alisha Bauer, Marisa Kuney
- Live Piano – Jeff Babko, Jamie Hartman
- Synth Piano – Jamie Hartman, The Professor
- Live Bass – Tyler Chester, Steve Daly
- Acoustic Guitars – Jamie Hartman

Credits adapted from the liner notes of Lotus, RCA Records.

== Charts ==
Upon the release of Lotus, "Army of Me" debuted on the South Korean singles chart at number 103 during the week of November 11 to 17, 2012, due to digital download sales of 2,689.

Chart (2012)	Peak position
South Korea (Gaon)	103

== Anastacia version ==
"Army of Me"

Single by Anastacia

from the album Ultimate Collection
- Released: October 23, 2015
- Recorded: 2015
- Genre: Pop
- Length: 3:25
- Label: Sony Music
- Songwriters: Christina Aguilera; Jamie Hartman; David Glass; Phil Bentley

Anastacia singles chronology
"Take This Chance" (2015)	"Army of Me" (2015)	"Caught in the Middle" (2017)

Audio
- "Anastacia - Army of Me (Official Audio)" on YouTube

American recording artist Anastacia covered the song for her second greatest hits album Ultimate Collection (2015). The song was released as album's second single on 23 October 2015 by Sony Music Entertainment. According to Pop Crush, Anastacia's version of the song a "subdued" piano and string-driven version of the original. It was debuted on Terry Wogan's BBC Radio 2 weekend show Weekend Wogan.

=== Release history ===
Region	Date	Format(s)	Label	Ref.
Various	October 23, 2015	Digital download	Sony Music Entertainment	
