= Monte Urano =

Monte Urano Monturano
- Comune
- Comune di Monte Urano
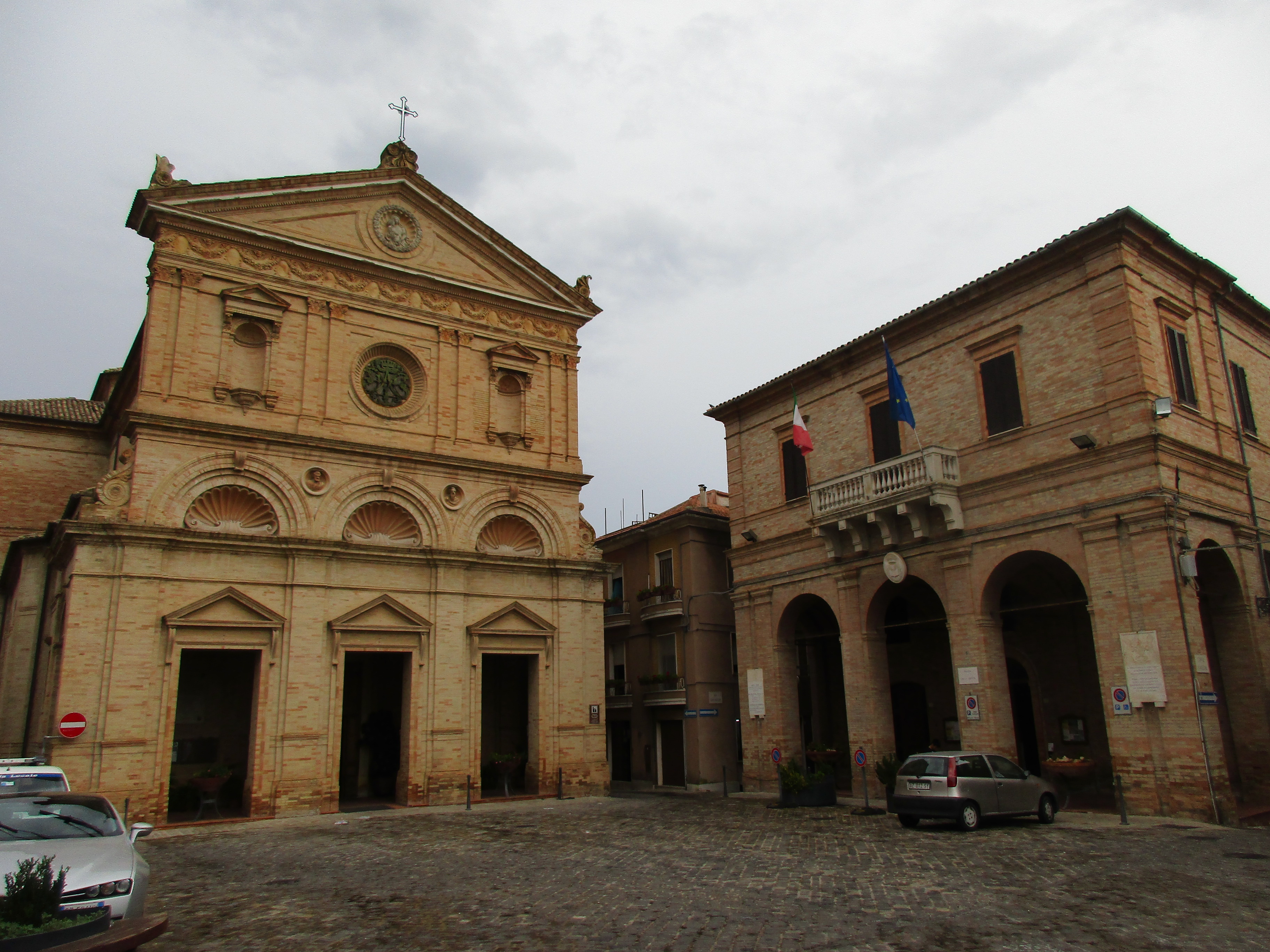
- Church of San Michele Arcangelo and town hall.

- Location within Italy Location within Marche
- Coordinates: 43°12′N 13°40′E
- Country: Italy
- Region: Marche
- Province: Fermo (FM)

Government
  - Mayor: Andrea Leoni

Area
  - Total: 16.7 km^{2} (6.4 sq mi)
- Elevation: 247 m (810 ft)

Population (30 November 2017)
  - Total: 8,222
  - Density: 492/km^{2} (1,280/sq mi)
- Demonym: Monturanesi
- Time zone: UTC+1 (CET)
  - Summer (DST): UTC+2 (CEST)
- Postal code: 63813
- Dialing code: 0734
- Website: Official website

Monte Urano (formerly also called Monteurano or Monturano) is a comune (municipality) in the Province of Fermo in the Italian region Marche, located about 50 kilometres (31 mi) south of Ancona and about 7 kilometres (4 mi) north of Fermo.

Monte Urano borders the following municipalities: Fermo, Montegranaro, Sant'Elpidio a Mare, Torre San Patrizio.

== Economy ==
Monte Urano is a center of shoe production, ranging from man, woman to child shoes, and it is therefore the site of many footwear factories.
