= Burgtheater Dinslaken =

German open air theatre

Coordinates: 51°33′44″N 6°43′53″E

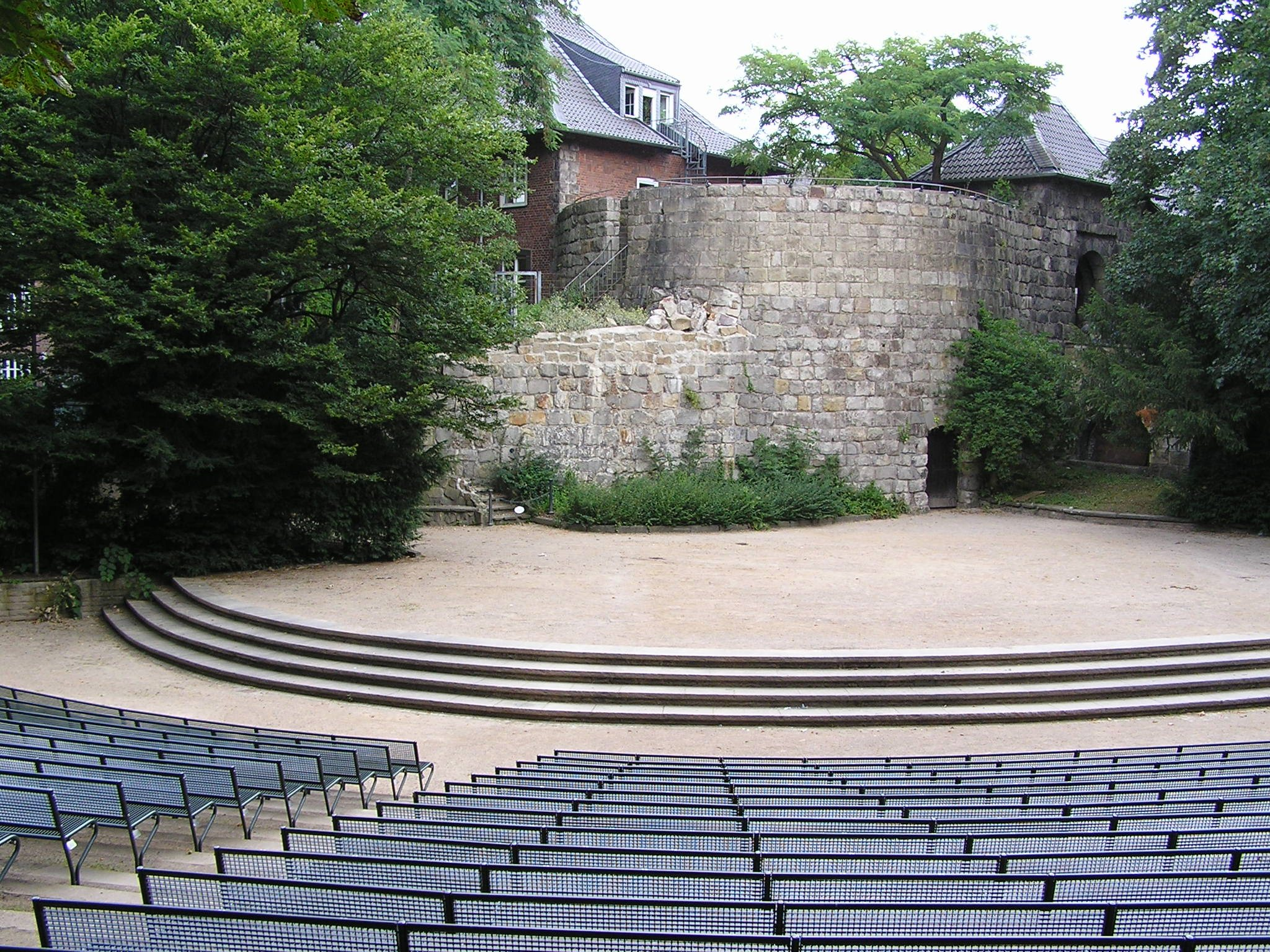
Open air theatre "Burghofbühne", Dinslaken

Burgtheater Dinslaken is an open air theatre in Dinslaken, North Rhine-Westphalia, Germany.

The theatre exists on the west side of the castle Burg Dinslaken. It was inaugurated in 1936 with a performance of a Carl Maria von Weber opera. It was destroyed during an air raid on Germany in 1945 and rebuilt in 1946. The theatre was a popular regional theatre in the 1950s and 1960s.
