= Stupid Little Things =

Single by Anastacia

from the album Resurrection
- B-side: "Dark White Girl"
- Released: April 4, 2014
- Length: 3:55
- Label: Sanctuary; BMG
- Songwriter(s): Anastacia; Sam Watters; Louis Biancaniello; Michael Biancaniello; Courtney Harrell
- Producer(s): Louis Biancaniello; Sam Watters; Michael Biancaniello

Anastacia singles chronology
"Best of You" (2012)	"Stupid Little Things" (2014)	"Staring at the Sun" (2014)

Music video
- "Anastacia - Stupid Little Things" on YouTube

"Stupid Little Things" is a single released by American singer-songwriter Anastacia in April 2014. It was taken from her sixth studio album Resurrection on the Sanctuary/BMG label in Germany. It was her first original release in five and half years. The single was moderately successful, charting in Belgium, Italy, Germany and Switzerland.

== Critical reception ==
"Stupid Little Things" received acclaim from music critics. Directlyrics called the single "excellent" and viewed it as Anastacia's best song since "Left Outside Alone". MuuMuse praised the song as "an almighty return, and she sounds as defiant as ever. It's nice to hear those pipes wailing out from the speakers, yeah? Break out those tinted glasses — Anastacia’s back." Popjustice rated the song eight out of 10. MTV's Brad Stern included it in his "5 Must-Hear Pop Songs of the Week!", stating that it was a "return to form" from the "pop princess and proof that Anastacia's a true survivor", after her second battle with breast cancer.

== Music video ==
The official music video was uploaded on March 21, 2014.

== Track listing ==
1. "Stupid Little Things" – 3:55
2. "Stupid Little Things" (Radio Edit) – 3:31
3. "Stupid Little Things" (Instrumental) – 3:55
4. "Dark White Girl" – 3:23

== Charts ==
Chart (2014)	Peak position
Austria (Ö3 Austria Top 40)	45
Belgium (Ultratip Bubbling Under Wallonia)	10
CIS Airplay (TopHit)	151
Finland Airplay (IFPI)	50
France (SNEP)	115
Germany (GfK)	38
German Airplay (Media Control Charts)	23
Italy (FIMI)	20
Netherlands (Dutch Top 40 Tipparade)	14
Russia (Radio TopHit Airplay)	151
Slovenia (SloTop50)	15
Spain (PROMUSICAE)	26
Switzerland (Schweizer Hitparade)	23

== Certifications ==
Region	Certification	Certified units/sales
Italy (FIMI)	Gold	15,000^{‡}
Switzerland (IFPI Switzerland)	Gold	15,000^{^}
^{^} Shipments figures based on certification alone.^{‡} Sales+streaming figures based on certification alone.

== Release history ==
Country	Date	Format	Label	Ref.
Italy	March 21, 2014	Contemporary hit radio	Spin-Go!	
Russia	April 25, 2014	Contemporary hit radio	Studiya Soyuz	
