= Paid My Dues =

2001 single by Anastacia

Single by Anastacia

from the album Freak of Nature
- B-side: "I Dreamed You"; "Funk Medley"
- Released: November 12, 2001
- Studio: Cove City Sound (Glen Cove, New York); Sony (New York City)
- Length: 3:21
- Label: Epic; Daylight
- Songwriters: Anastacia; Greg Lawson; Damon Sharpe; LaMenga Kafi
- Producer: Ric Wake

Anastacia singles chronology
| "Made for Lovin' You" (2001) | "Paid My Dues" (2001) | "One Day in Your Life" (2002) |

Audio sample
- Paid My Dues: file; help

Music video
- "Paid My Dues" on YouTube

"Paid My Dues" is a song by American recording artist Anastacia from her second studio album, Freak of Nature (2001). It was released on November 12, 2001, as the album's lead single. The song was written by Anastacia, Greg Lawson, Damon Sharpe, and LaMenga Kafi and was produced by Ric Wake with additional production by Richie Jones.

"Paid My Dues" became a commercial success, reaching number one in Denmark, Hungary, Italy, Norway, and Switzerland, as well as peaking within the top 10 in several other mainland European countries.

== Composition ==
"Paid My Dues" was written by Anastacia, LaMenga Kafi, Greg Lawson, and Damon Sharpe, while production was handled by Ric Wake, with additional production by Richie Jones. Anastacia wrote the song about her early career in the music industry. In an interview with Billboard, she said: "For years, I had been told my voice was too black, that I should get contacts and ditch the glasses, that I was too in-your-face, the list goes on. Now, these are the very things that people respond to." According to James Salmon from Yahoo! Music, the song is a "typically robust 'go girl' anthem."

== Critical reception ==
Jose F. Promis writing for AllMusic called the song "the soulful, bombastic rocker". Sal Cinquemani from Slant Magazine wrote that "her tenacious attitude on songs like 'Paid My Dues' carve a unique niche for the singer." Aidin Vaziri wrote for Rolling Stone that the song is "grating" and one of Freak of Nature's "moments of sheer overkill".

== Music video ==
Directed by Liz Friedlander, the music video for "Paid My Dues" was shot in Los Angeles, California. In the beginning, Anastacia is speaking virtually inside multiple large monitors. Afterwards she is seen in her room packing her suitcases. Following this, she is trying to make her way through various men in a small room. Then she is in a disco, where she successfully finds her way through people dancing, this time to enter the stage through another monitor, eventually performing her song. In the end she pulls out the electricity cable, powering off the large monitors seen in the beginning.

== Track listings ==
UK CD single

1. "Paid My Dues" – 3:20
2. "Paid My Dues" (The S-Man's Darkstar mix) – 5:25
3. "I Dreamed You" – 5:08

UK cassette single

1. "Paid My Dues" – 3:20
2. "Paid My Dues" (The S-Man's Darkstar radio edit) – 3:29
3. "I Dreamed You" – 5:08

European CD1

1. "Paid My Dues" – 3:20
2. "Funk Medley" (live from Amsterdam) – 7:30

European CD2

1. "Paid My Dues" – 3:20
2. "Paid My Dues" (The S-Man's Darkstar mix) – 5:25
3. "Paid My Dues" (The S-Man's Darkstar dub mix) – 5:23
4. "Funk Medley" (live from Amsterdam) – 7:30

Australian CD single

1. "Paid My Dues"
2. "Paid My Dues" (The S-Man's Darkstar radio edit)
3. "Paid My Dues" (The S-Man's Darkstar mix)
4. "I Dreamed You" (album version)
5. "Funk Medley" (live from Amsterdam)

== Credits and personnel ==
Credits are taken from the European CD1 liner notes.

Studios

- Recorded at Cove City Sound Studios (Glen Cove, New York, US) and Sony Music Studios (New York City)
- Mixed at Cove City Sound Studios (Glen Cove, New York, US)

Personnel

- Anastacia – writing, vocals, backing vocals
- Greg Lawson, Damon Sharpe – writing
- LaMenga Kafi – writing, backing vocals
- Nicki Richards, Danny Madden – backing vocals
- Eric Kupper – keyboards, guitars
- Marc Russell – bass guitar, production coordination
- Ric Wake – production, arrangement
- Richie Jones – additional production, arrangement, mixing, drum programming
- Dan Hetzel – mixing, engineering
- Jim Annunziato – engineering assistant
- "Young" Dave Scheuer – recording
- Thomas R. Yezzi – recording (lead vocals)
- Lisa Braudé – executive production

== Charts ==
=== Weekly charts ===
| Chart (2001–2002) | Peak position |
|---|---|
| Australia (ARIA) | 39 |
| Austria (Ö3 Austria Top 40) | 3 |
| Belgium (Ultratop 50 Flanders) | 6 |
| Belgium (Ultratop 50 Wallonia) | 16 |
| Croatia International (HRT) | 2 |
| Denmark (Tracklisten) | 1 |
| Europe (Eurochart Hot 100) | 2 |
| Finland (Suomen virallinen lista) | 18 |
| France (SNEP) | 10 |
| Germany (GfK) | 3 |
| Greece (IFPI) | 6 |
| Hungary (MAHASZ) | 1 |
| Ireland (IRMA) | 34 |
| Italy (FIMI) | 1 |
| Netherlands (Dutch Top 40) | 4 |
| Netherlands (Single Top 100) | 5 |
| New Zealand (Recorded Music NZ) | 24 |
| Norway (VG-lista) | 1 |
| Poland (Polish Airplay Chart) | 2 |
| Portugal (AFP) | 2 |
| Romania (Romanian Top 100) | 3 |
| Scottish Singles Sales (Official Charts) | 9 |
| Spain (Promusicae) | 7 |
| Sweden (Sverigetopplistan) | 2 |
| Switzerland (Schweizer Hitparade) | 1 |
| UK Singles (Official Charts) | 14 |

=== Year-end charts ===
| Chart (2001) | Position |
|---|---|
| Netherlands (Dutch Top 40) | 92 |
| Netherlands (Single Top 100) | 69 |
| Sweden (Hitlistan) | 47 |
| Switzerland (Schweizer Hitparade) | 64 |

| Chart (2002) | Position |
|---|---|
| Austria (Ö3 Austria Top 40) | 14 |
| Belgium (Ultratop 50 Flanders) | 75 |
| Europe (Eurochart Hot 100) | 15 |
| France (SNEP) | 78 |
| Germany (Media Control) | 26 |
| Italy (FIMI) | 26 |
| Netherlands (Dutch Top 40) | 38 |
| Netherlands (Single Top 100) | 68 |
| Sweden (Hitlistan) | 36 |
| Switzerland (Schweizer Hitparade) | 11 |

== Certifications ==
| Region | Certification | Certified units/sales |
|---|---|---|
| Austria (IFPI Austria) | Gold | 20,000^{*} |
| Belgium (BRMA) | Gold | 25,000^{*} |
| France (SNEP) | Gold | 250,000^{*} |
| Germany (BVMI) | Gold | 250,000^{^} |
| Norway (IFPI Norway) | Gold | |
| Switzerland (IFPI Switzerland) | Gold | 20,000^{^} |
^{*} Sales figures based on certification alone.^{^} Shipments figures based on certification alone.

== Release history ==
Release dates and formats for "Paid My Dues"
| Region | Date | Format(s) | Label(s) | Ref. |
|---|---|---|---|---|
| France | November 12, 2001 | 12-inch vinyl; maxi CD | Sony Music | |
| Germany | November 12, 2001 | CD; maxi CD | Sony Music | |
| Australia | November 19, 2001 | CD | Sony Music | |
| United Kingdom | November 19, 2001 | Cassette; CD | RCA | |
