= Reamonn discography =

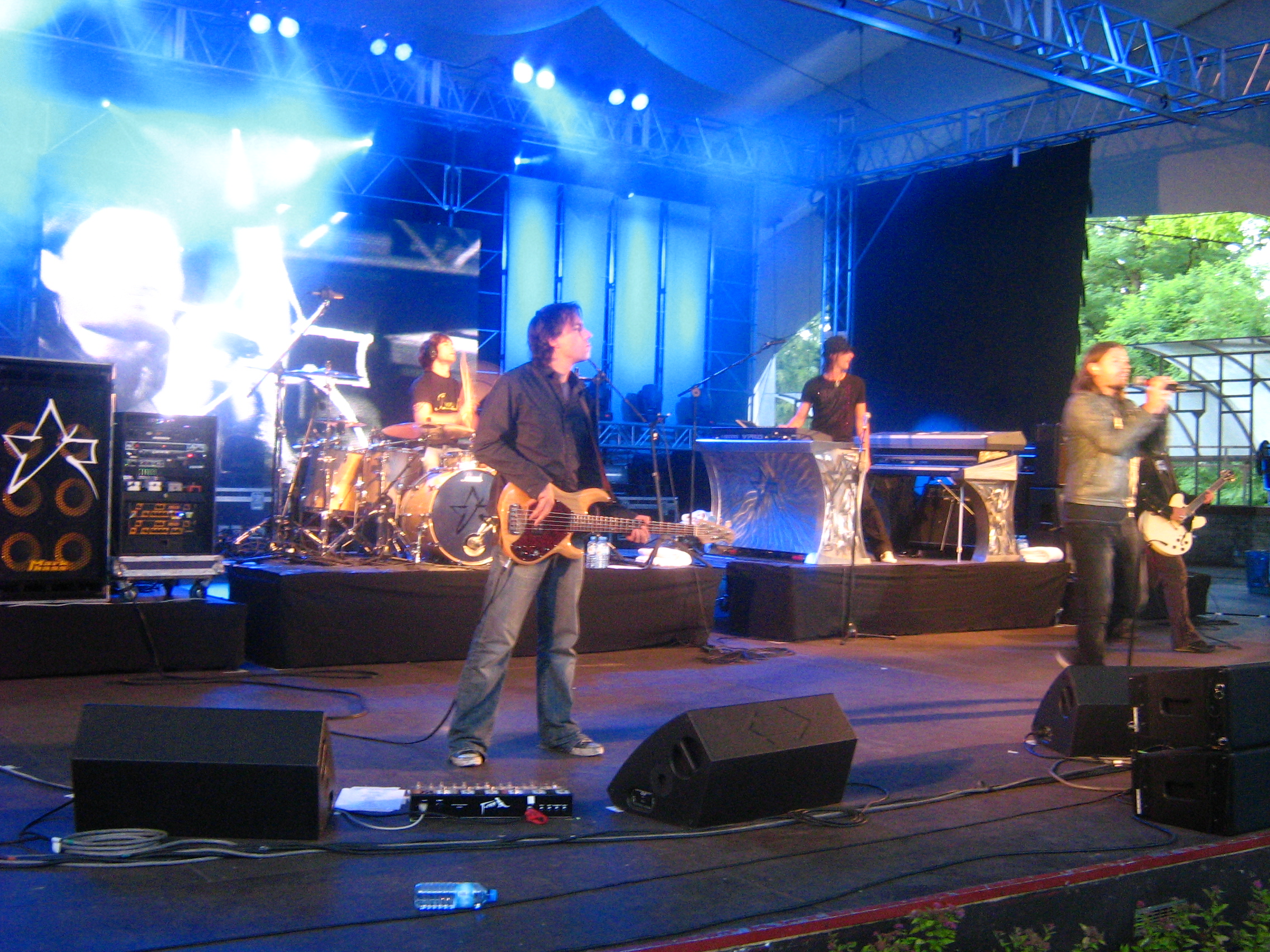
- Studio albums: 5
- Live albums: 3
- Compilation albums: 1
- Singles: 24
- DVDs: 2

This is the discography of the German pop-rock band Reamonn.

Reamonn has released five studio albums, three live albums, one compilation album, 24 singles and two music DVDs by Island Records and Virgin Records.

== Albums ==
=== Studio albums ===
Title	Album details	Peak chart positions						Certifications
Title	Album details	GER	AUT	NLD	POL	PRT	SWI	Certifications
Tuesday	Released: 29 May 2000 (GER); Label: Virgin	5	10	92	43	—	9	GER: Gold
Dream No. 7	Released: 19 November 2001 (GER); Label: Virgin	6	37	—	—	—	26	
Beautiful Sky	Released: 23 May 2003 (GER); Label: Virgin	3	39	—	42	9	16	GER: Platinum
Wish	Released: 21 April 2006 (GER); Label: Island	2	13	—	—	—	2	GER: Platinum
Reamonn	Released: 7 November 2008 (GER); Label: Island	2	9	—	—	—	7	GER: 3× Gold
"—" denotes a recording that did not chart or was not released in that territory.

=== Live albums ===
Title	Album details	Peak chart positions			
Title	Album details	GER	AUT	PRT	SWI
Raise Your Hands	Released: 10 September 2004 (GER); Label: Virgin	7	33	25	20
Wish Live	Released: 1 June 2007 (GER); Label: Island	—	—	—	—
Reamonn Live	Released: 20 November 2009 (GER); Label: Island	—	—	—	—
Eleven Live & Acoustic at the Casino	Released: 26 November 2010; Label: Island	—	—	—	—
"—" denotes a recording that did not chart or was not released in that territory.

=== Compilation albums ===
Title	Album details	Peak chart positions			Certifications
Title	Album details	GER	AUT	SWI	Certifications
Eleven	Released: 27 August 2010 (GER); Label: Island	6	27	19	GER: Gold

== Singles ==
Title	Year	Peak chart positions						Certifications	Album
Title	Year	AUT	GER	GRE	IRL	NLD	SWI	Certifications	Album
"Supergirl"	2000	4	4	—	—	4	10	GER: Gold	Tuesday
"Josephine"	2000	—	35	—	—	—	61		Tuesday
"Waiting There for You"	2000	—	80	—	—	—	—		Tuesday
"Jeanny" (featuring Xavier Naidoo)	2001	31	18	—	—	—	86		Dream No. 7
"Weep"	2001	—	69	—	—	—	—		Dream No. 7
"Life Is a Dream"	2002	—	77	—	—	—	—		Dream No. 7
"Place of No Return (In Zaire)"	2002	56	38	—	—	—	—		Dream No. 7
"Star"	2003	41	23	40	50	—	39		Beautiful Sky
"Alright"	2003	5	17	—	—	—	36		Beautiful Sky
"Strong"	2004	—	45	—	—	—	—		Beautiful Sky
"Sunshine Baby"	2004	—	65	—	—	—	—		Beautiful Sky
"Angels Fly"	2005	—	—	—	—	—	—		Beautiful Sky
"Promise (You and Me)"	2006	29	17	—	—	—	35		Wish
"Tonight"	2006	28	11	47	—	—	20	IFPI GRE: Gold	Wish
"The Only Ones" (featuring Lucie Silvas)	2006	26	23	—	—	—	32		Wish
"Serpentine"	2007	66	38	—	—	—	—		Wish
"Open Skies"	2008	—	—	—	—	—	—		Reamonn
"Through the Eyes of a Child"	2008	13	6	—	—	—	15		Reamonn
"Million Miles"	2009	30	17	—	—	—	41		Reamonn
"Set of Keys"	2009	—	—	—	—	—	—		Reamonn
"Moments Like This"	2009	53	19	—	—	—	—		Reamonn
"Aeroplane"	2009	52	37	—	—	—	—		Reamonn
"Yesterday"	2010	—	31	—	—	—	—		Eleven
"Colder"	2010	—	67	—	—	—	—		Eleven
"—" denotes a recording that did not chart or was not released in that territory.

== DVDs ==
- 2004: Raise Your Hands
- 2006: Wish (Live)
