= Eleven (Reamonn album) =

Compilation album by Reamonn
- Released: 27 August 2010
- Genre: Pop rock
- Label: Island

Reamonn chronology
Reamonn Live (2009)	Eleven (2010)	Eleven Live & Acoustic at the Casino (2010)

Singles from Eleven
- 1. "Yesterday" Released: 7 August 2010; 2. "Colder" Released: 9 November 2010

Eleven is a compilation album by German rock group Reamonn. It was released on 27 August 2010 through Island Records/Universal Music Group. The album was certified Gold in Germany in 2011, and has charted in Germany, Austria, Switzerland and Greece.

== Promotion ==
"Yesterday" was released as the lead single to promote the album on 7 August 2010.

The second single from Eleven, "Colder", was released on 9 November 2010.

== Track listing ==
Standard Version
No.	Title	Length
1.	"Yesterday"	4:09
2.	"Colder"	3:41
3.	"Let the Morning Sleep"	4:12
4.	"Through the Eyes of a Child"	3:51
5.	"Million Miles"	3:48
6.	"Moments Like This"	3:48
7.	"Aeroplane"	4:01
8.	"Promise" (Extended Version)	4:43
9.	"Tonight"	3:35
10.	"Serpentine"	4:07
11.	"The Only Ones"	3:49
12.	"Star"	4:13
13.	"Alright"	4:57
14.	"Strong"	4:35
15.	"Weep"	5:15
16.	"Life Is a Dream"	5:01
17.	"Supergirl"	4:04
18.	"Josephine" (New Version 2010)	3:33
19.	"Waiting There for You"	4:14

Digital Version bonus tracks
No.	Title	Length
20.	"Reamonn About "Yesterday""	0:20
21.	"Reamonn About "Colder""	0:16
22.	"Reamonn About "Let the Morning Sleep""	0:23
23.	"Reamonn About "Through the Eyes of a Child""	0:28
24.	"Reamonn About "Million Miles""	0:23
25.	"Reamonn About "Moments Like This""	0:33
26.	"Reamonn About "Aeroplane""	0:30
27.	"Reamonn About "Promise""	0:31
28.	"Reamonn About "Tonight""	0:35
29.	"Reamonn About "Serpentine""	0:33
30.	"Reamonn About "the Only Ones""	0:45
31.	"Reamonn About "Star""	0:50
32.	"Reamonn About "Alright""	0:39
33.	"Reamonn About "Strong""	0:27
34.	"Reamonn About "Weep""	0:39
35.	"Reamonn About "Life Is a Dream""	0:41
36.	"Reamonn About "Supergirl""	0:29
37.	"Reamonn About "Waiting There for You""	1:01
38.	"Colder" (Demo)	3:22

== Personnel ==
Reamonn

- Rea Garvey – vocals, guitar
- Uwe Bossert – guitar
- Mike "Gomezz" Gommeringer – drums
- Philipp Rauenbusch – bass guitar
- Sebastian Padotzke – keyboards, saxophone, flute

== Charts ==
Chart (2010)	Peak position
Austrian Albums (Ö3 Austria)	27
German Albums (Offizielle Top 100)	6
Greek Albums (IFPI)	9
Swiss Albums (Schweizer Hitparade)	19

== Certifications ==
Region	Certification	Certified units/sales
Germany (BVMI)	Gold	100,000^{^}
^{^} Shipments figures based on certification alone.
