= Our Songs (album) =

Studio album by Anastacia
- Released: September 22, 2023
- Length: 48:22
- Label: Stars by Edel
- Producer: Christian Geller

Anastacia chronology
Evolution (2017)	Our Songs (2023)	#Ntk25 Anastacia Live in Concert (2026)

Singles from Our Songs
- 1. "Best Days" Released: April 28, 2023; 2. "Supergirl" Released: July 14, 2023; 3. "Now or Never" Released: August 25, 2023; 4. "Just You" Released: September 21, 2023; 5. "Highs & Lows" Released: June 7, 2024

Our Songs is the eighth studio album by American singer Anastacia. It was released on September 22, 2023, through German-based recording label Stars by Edel. Entirely produced by Christian Geller, the album marked Anastacia's first album release since Evolution (2017). Conceptually, Our Songs is a cover album that features a compilation of mostly translated interpretations of German rock songs, involving material that was originated by Scorpions, Tokio Hotel, Die Toten Hosen, Unheilig, and others.

Upon its release, the album earned largely mixed reviews from music critics who praised the singer's vocal performance but felt that her versions were for inferior to the original songs. Our Songs debuted at number two on the German Albums Chart, becoming Anastacia's highest-charting album in nearly two decades. It further reached the top ten in Austria and Switzerland and reached number 16 on the UK Album Downloads Chart. A reissue of Our Songs, the Gold deluxe edition, was released on June 21, 2024.

== Background ==
The project originated when German producer Christian Geller approached Anastacia and her manager with the idea of covering German songs. Initially confused, as she neither sang nor spoke German fluently, Anastacia soon learned that Geller intended for her to perform German hits translated into English. He introduced her to German artists who had previously recorded English-language songs, such as The Scorpions and Alphaville, helping her understand the concept, though she remained uncertain about the feasibility of translating major German hits. The project gained momentum when Campino, lead singer of Die Toten Hosen, expressed interest and offered one of his songs, "Tage wie diese", which was adapted into English as "Best Days". The song became her first translated release and inspired the vision of creating a full album of English-language versions of German songs.

On November 8, 2022, during her I'm Outta Lockdown Tour, Anastacia revealed to UK channel ITV News that she was working on a yet-undisclosed project for a 2023 release, saying: "It's a different project than I've ever done. I'm not doing music I wrote, I'm doing music other people wrote but from a different language". In April 2023, media outlets announced that Our Songs will feature interpretations of German songs, which have been translated to English. On Anastacia's website the album is described as: "From 100% pop to stadium-sized rock radio anthems, the album brings together classics from different genres and decades, presenting these highlights of German music history to an international audience for the first time". In addition to "Best Days", Anastacia also recorded versions of "Monsoon" by Tokio Hotel, "Forever Young" by Alphaville and "Still Loving You" by Scorpions.

== Promotion ==
In promotion of the album Stars by Edel released "Best Days" on April 28, 2023 as the album's first single. On July 14, second single,"Supergirl," a cover of the 2000 Reamonn song, was released. *A third single, "Now or Never", a cover of Johannes Oerding's 2019 song "An guten Tagen", was released on August 25. A music video was released on the same day. The song "Just You", was released on September 21 alongside its music video, directed by Marcel Brell. The song features the original artist, Peter Maffay and is a cover of his own "So Bist du", released in 1979. A fifth single, "Highs & Lows", taken from the deluxe version of the album, was released on June 7, 2024.

== Reception ==
Professional ratings
Review scores
Source	Rating
Laut.de	1/5 stars
RetroPop	3/5 stars

The album drew a range of responses from critics, who lauded her singing but considered her versions less compelling than the original tracks. Renowned for Sound editor Ryan Bulbeck called Our Songs a "mid-paced, but sweet album, chocked full of ballads and sing-along moments. While there are no stand-out uptempo tunes to dance to, listeners will be pleasantly surprised by Anastacia’s versatility. Her voice, also, is as powerful as ever, and that alone makes this an album to listen to". UK-based popular culture website Culturefix noted that: "It is certainly a unique concept for an album and it is likely that many of the tracks will feel original and fresh to listeners outside Germany".

Antenne Brandenburg critic Tina Knop remarked that "new interpretations fit Anastacia so well that when you listen to them you're suddenly no longer sure whether it's an Anastacia original or a cover". RetroPop magazine felt that as "an album, Our Songs is a fine collection of material [...] with a vocalist as adept as Anastacia taking command over the project, they couldn't be in safer hands. What's less convincing is the overall concept, which despite being perhaps her most international work at times feels more of a passion project than the return of one of the most successful pop acts of the 2000s after more than half a decade". Der Spiegel felt that "despite [Anastacia's] recognizable voice, some of the songs lack the feeling of the original, such as Sarah Connor's ballad "Wie schön du bist" ("Beautiful") or the Lindenberg classic "Cello". The instruments recorded sound more like loveless instrumental versions. This may not bother die-hard Anastacia fans from Germany". Sven Kabelitz from Laut.de dismissed the album as "calculated". He found that "every single one of these twelve songs is better in the original than here".

== Commercial performance ==
Our Songs debuted at number two on the German Albums Chart in the week of September 29, 2023. This marked Anastacia's highest-charting album since Anastacia (2004) and first top ten album since 2014's Resurrection. In the United Kingdom, the album debuted at number 16 on the UK Albums Downloads Chart. It also placed on three other charts in that country.

== Track listing ==
Our Songs track listing
No.	Title	Writer(s)	Original artist (date)	Length
1.	"Best Days"	Andreas Frege; Andreas Von Holst; Timothy Smith	Die Toten Hosen (2012)	4:32
2.	"Now or Never"	Johannes Oerding; Mark Anthony; Robert Smith; Benjamin Dernhoff	Johannes Oerding (2019)	3:18
3.	"Beautiful"	Sarah Connor; Daniel Faust; Peter Plate; Ulf Leo Sommer	Sarah Connor (2015)	3:20
4.	"Still Loving You"	Rudolf Schenker; Klaus Meine	Scorpions (1984)	5:33
5.	"Monsoon"	Dave Roth; Patrick Benzner; David Jost; Bill Kaulitz; Rebecca Roth	Tokio Hotel (2007)	3:58
6.	"Born to Live"	Bernd Heinrich Graf; Henning Verlage	Unheilig (2010)	3:28
7.	"Cello"	Udo Lindenberg	Udo Lindenberg (1973)	3:30
8.	"Just You" (duet with Peter Maffay)	Peter Maffay; Bernd Meinunger	Peter Maffay (1979)	4:40
9.	"Symphony"	Thomas Stolle; Johannes Stolle; Stefanie Kloss; Andreas Jan Nowak	Silbermond (2004)	4:50
10.	"Supergirl"	Mike Gommeringer; Philipp Rauenbusch; Rea Garvey; Sebastian Padotzke; Uwe Bossert	Reamonn (2000)	4:03
11.	"Forever Young"	Marian Gold; Bernhard Lloyd; Frank Mertens	Alphaville (1984)	3:17
12.	"An Angel"	Kathy Kelly; Hartmut Pfannmüller	The Kelly Family (1994)	3:53
Total length:				48:26

Golden deluxe edition – bonus tracks
No.	Title	Writer(s)	Original artist (date)	Length
13.	"Highs and Lows"	Anastacia; Andreas Herbig; Emma Rosen; Michael Schulte; Patrick Salmy; Ricardo Munoz	Michael Schulte (2019)	3:54
14.	"Control"	Zoe Wees; Munoz; Salmy; Rosen	Zoe Wees (2022)	3:55
15.	"Rooftop"	Christoph Cronauer; Michelle Leonard; Nico Wellenbrink; Nicolas Rebscher; Vito Kovach	Nico Santos (2017)	3:18
Total length:				59:13

== Charts ==
=== Weekly charts ===
Weekly chart performance for Our Songs
Chart (2023)	Peak position
Austrian Albums (Ö3 Austria)	5
Belgian Albums (Ultratop Flanders)	116
Belgian Albums (Ultratop Wallonia)	168
German Albums (Offizielle Top 100)	2
Swiss Albums (Schweizer Hitparade)	8
Swiss Albums (Les charts Romandy)	5
UK Album Downloads (Official Charts)	16
UK Albums Sales (OCC)	75
UK Independent Albums (Official Charts)	31
UK Record Store (OCC)	19

=== Year-end charts ===
Year-end chart performance for Our Songs
Chart (2023)	Position
German Albums (Offizielle Top 100)	60

== Release history ==
Our Songs release history
Region	Date	Format	Label	Edition	Ref.
Various	September 22, 2023	CD; digital download; LP; streaming	Stars by Edel	Standard	
Various	June 21, 2024	CD; digital download; streaming	Stars by Edel	Gold deluxe	
