= Moments Like This =

Moments Like This may refer to:

- "Moments Like This" (Frank Loesser and Burton Lane song), a 1938 popular song
- "Moments Like This" (Reamonn song)
- Moments Like This (album), an album by Peggy Lee, featuring a cover of the 1938 song

== See also ==
- "A Moment Like This", a 2002 song by Kelly Clarkson
