= Reamonn Live =

Live album by Reamonn
- Released: 20 November 2009 (Germany)
- Recorded: 2009
- Genre: Pop rock
- Label: Island / Universal

Reamonn chronology
Reamonn (2008)	Reamonn Live (2009)	Eleven (2010)

Alternative cover

Reamonn Live is a live album by the German band Reamonn. It is Reamonn's final release, as the band entered a hiatus in 2012. It was released on 20 November 2009.

== CD ==
=== Track listing ===
1. "Faith" - 4:11
2. "Set Of Keys" - 4:36
3. "Through The Eyes Of A Child" - 4:06
4. "Aeroplane" - 3:58
5. "Broken Stone" - 4:26
6. "Tonight" - 5:33
7. "Open Skies" - 4:36
8. "Free Like A Bird" - 4:50
9. "Million Miles" - 3:56
10. "Moments Like This" - 3:59
11. "Serpentine" - 7:15
12. "It's Over Now" - 5:59
13. "Serenade Me" - 6:10
14. "Goodbyes" - 4:17
15. "The Island" (Bonus Track) - 5:50

== DVD ==
Behind Closed Doors (On The Road To Reamonn)

=== Track listing ===
1. "Road To Reamonn" - 22:03
2. "From Burbank To Downtown - 8:05
3. "The Million Miles Tour" - 23:26
4. "From Ring To Park" - 4:16
5. "Out Of Order" - 5:33

== Personnel ==
- Rea Garvey – vocals, guitar
- Uwe Bossert – guitar
- Sebastian Padotzke – keyboard
- Mike "Gomezz" Gommeringer – beats
- Phillip Rauenbusch – bass
