= Parov Stelar =

Austrian DJ and producer (born 1974)

- Born: Marcus Füreder; 27 November 1974 (age 51); Linz, Austria
- Genres: Electro swing; house
- Occupations: Composer; record producer; disc jockey; visual artist
- Years active: 1998–present
- Label: Etage Noir
- Website: www.parovstelar.com

Marcus Füreder (born 27 November 1974), known professionally as Parov Stelar, is an Austrian music producer and DJ. He is considered a pioneer of electro swing and is one of the most internationally successful artists from Austria. In addition to his music, he is also known for his visual artwork, which has been shown in numerous galleries and exhibitions.

His musical style blends electronic music with elements of jazz, swing, and blues, characterized by a fusion of modern beats, vintage sounds, and distinctive brass sections. Many of his tracks have been used in films, commercials, and TV series, and remain in demand worldwide.

He first gained recognition in the international club and festival scene in 2004 with the release of the EP KissKiss, followed shortly by the album Rough Cuts. These early works laid the foundation for his distinctive sound. With later tracks such as Catgroove, Booty Swing and All Night, he became one of the most-streamed electro swing artists and played a key role in shaping the genre. His music has consistently charted, including reaching #1 on the US iTunes Electronic Charts with The Sun (2018) and Voodoo Sonic Pt. 2 (2020). His song All Night received double platinum certification in Italy (2017), and platinum in Germany (2023) and Austria (2025).

Since 2005, Parov Stelar has brought his music to the stage with the Parov Stelar Band, a blend of DJ set and live instrumentation. The band has toured around the world, performing at major festivals such as Coachella (US), Glastonbury (UK), Sziget (HU), and Lollapalooza (DE) and in sold-out venues like PlayStation Theater in New York, Alexandra Palace in London, and Zénith in Paris.

To date, Parov Stelar has released ten studio albums, one live album, and more than twenty EPs. He has received ten Amadeus Austrian Music Awards for his work.

== Life and career ==
=== Early life and musical beginnings ===
Marcus Füreder grew up in Linz and developed a passion for music and art at an early age. He began his career as a DJ in local clubs, performing under the pseudonym Plasma or his real name, drawing inspiration from jazz, soul, house and electronic music. These influences would later shape his distinctive musical style.

To pursue his creative vision independently, Füreder founded his own record label, Etage Noir Recordings, in 2003. He has been releasing music under the name Parov Stelar through the label ever since. His early releases, including the EP Kiss Kiss (2004), followed shortly by the album Rough Cuts, quickly gained international attention in the club and festival scene.

=== Breakthrough and musical development ===
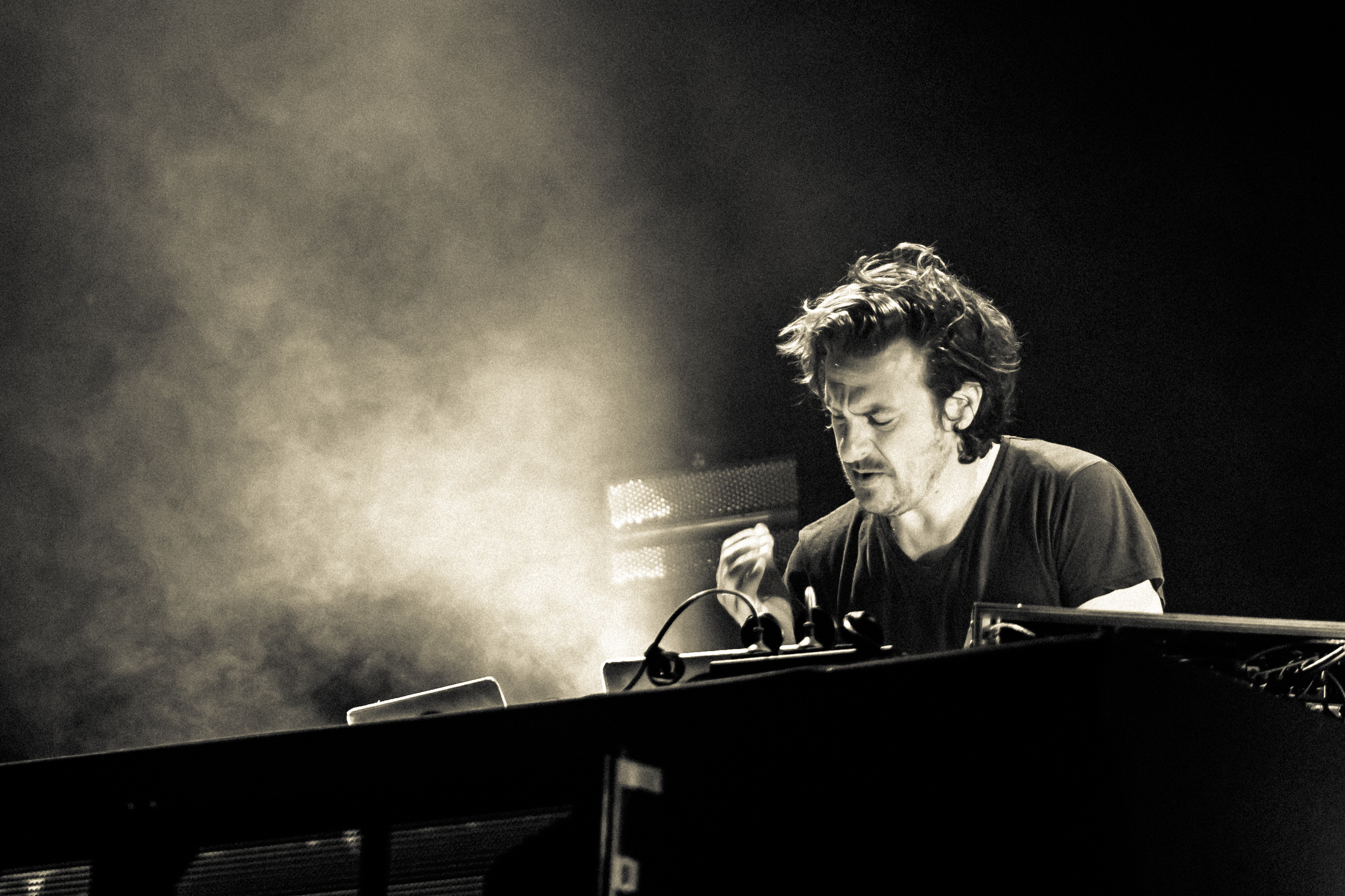
Stelar performing live in 2021

With the albums Seven and Storm (2005) and Shine (2007), Parov Stelar refined his sound by incorporating elements of jazz, house, and broken beat into his productions. These early works laid the foundation for his later success, which saw a stronger emphasis on electro swing with the release of Coco (2009).

The two-part album Coco marked his definitive breakthrough and established him as a leading figure in electro swing. It featured the track "Catgroove", which went viral and has amassed millions of streams. In February 2010, Canadian dancer Michael Startsev posted a video to YouTube (under the username "takeSomeCrime") in which he dances to "Catgroove"; it has gained over 55 million views as of July 2025.

In 2012, Stelar released the double album The Princess, which included globally recognized hits like "Booty Swing" and "All Night". His subsequent albums, The Art of Sampling (2013) and The Demon Diaries (2015), continued to evolve his sound. With The Burning Spider (2017), Parov Stelar departed from his classic electro swing sound, bringing blues and jazz elements to the forefront.

In 2020 he released Voodoo Sonic - The Trilogy, a three-part album series that combined his musical roots with new influences, showcasing different facets of his sound. His 2022 album, Moonlight Love Affair, took a more melodic direction, blending elements of pop and electronic dance music with his signature style in tracks such as "Candy Girl" and "Toxic Lover".

Throughout his career, Parov Stelar has worked with internationally renowned artists such as Lana Del Rey, Bryan Ferry, Marvin Gaye and Lady Gaga. He has also remixed two songs by fellow Austrian artist Falco: "Vienna Calling", released in 2017 as part of the Falco 60 anniversary compilation, and "Der Kommissar", released as a standalone single in 2022.

=== Live performances and band ===
In addition to his work as a producer, Parov Stelar is also an active live performer. In 2005, he performed with a full band for the first time, blending electronic beats with live instrumentation. His high-energy shows combine music, elaborate visuals, and elements of improvisation.

Parov Stelar and his band have played at many of the world's leading music festivals, including Coachella (US), Glastonbury (UK), Sziget (HU), Hurricane, Southside, and Lollapalooza (DE), Pukkelpop (BE), Vieilles Charrues and Solidays (FR), NOS Alive! (PT), Untold Festival (RO), Frequency (AT), and Fête de l’Humanité in Paris, which drew a crowd of 100,000. He has also performed at renowned venues such as the O2 Academy Brixton in London and Zénith in Paris. His tours regularly take him across Europe, North America, and beyond. By combining live instruments with electronic sounds, he sets himself apart from traditional DJ sets and creates a distinctive live experience.

On 16 May 2026, Stelar performed live as an interval act during the Grand Final of the Eurovision Song Contest in Vienna.

== Music in commercials, film and TV ==
Parov Stelar gained international recognition through the widespread use of his music in advertising, film, and television. His tracks have been featured in global campaigns for major brands including Audi, Bacardi, BMW, Coach, Colgate, Courvoisier, Escada, Ferrero, Fiat, Google, Microsoft, Target, Telecom Italia, Vodafone, Paco Rabanne and Cosmopolitan.

His music has also been featured in films, TV series, and documentaries — for example, in the film The Spy Who Dumped Me, Hector and the Search for Happiness, Samba, and Traumfrauen, and in TV series such as Dollface, Love 101, Valeria, and Maestro in Blue. He also composed the soundtrack for season one of the German series Wo wir sind, ist oben, as well as the documentary Scatter My Ashes at Bergdorf's.

== Visual art ==
The Upper Austria-born artist studied painting and graphic design at the University of Art and Design in Linz and at the University of the Arts in Berlin. In the summer of 2021 Parov Stelar gave a first insight into his work as a visual artist in his hometown Linz. The Francisco Carolinum Museum presented 25 large-format paintings such as "HELLO Mom" and "I'll be OK soon" as well as "Toxic Lover" in which he reflects on autobiographical events and fears, processing them artistically. Just like in his music, text plays a crucial role in his visual artworks.

Following his debut exhibition in 2021, Parov Stelar's visual art has been showcased in a number of exhibitions. In 2022, his solo show danke, gut was presented at Galerie Schloss Parz. In 2023, his work was featured in the Music Lounge exhibition series at the Technisches Museum Vienna. He continued in 2024 with multiple solo exhibitions, including blind date at the Glascubus Ursulinenhof, Linz, second date at Galerie Haas & Gschwandtner in Salzburg, and a presentation at Salon Bucherer in Vienna.

== Personal life ==
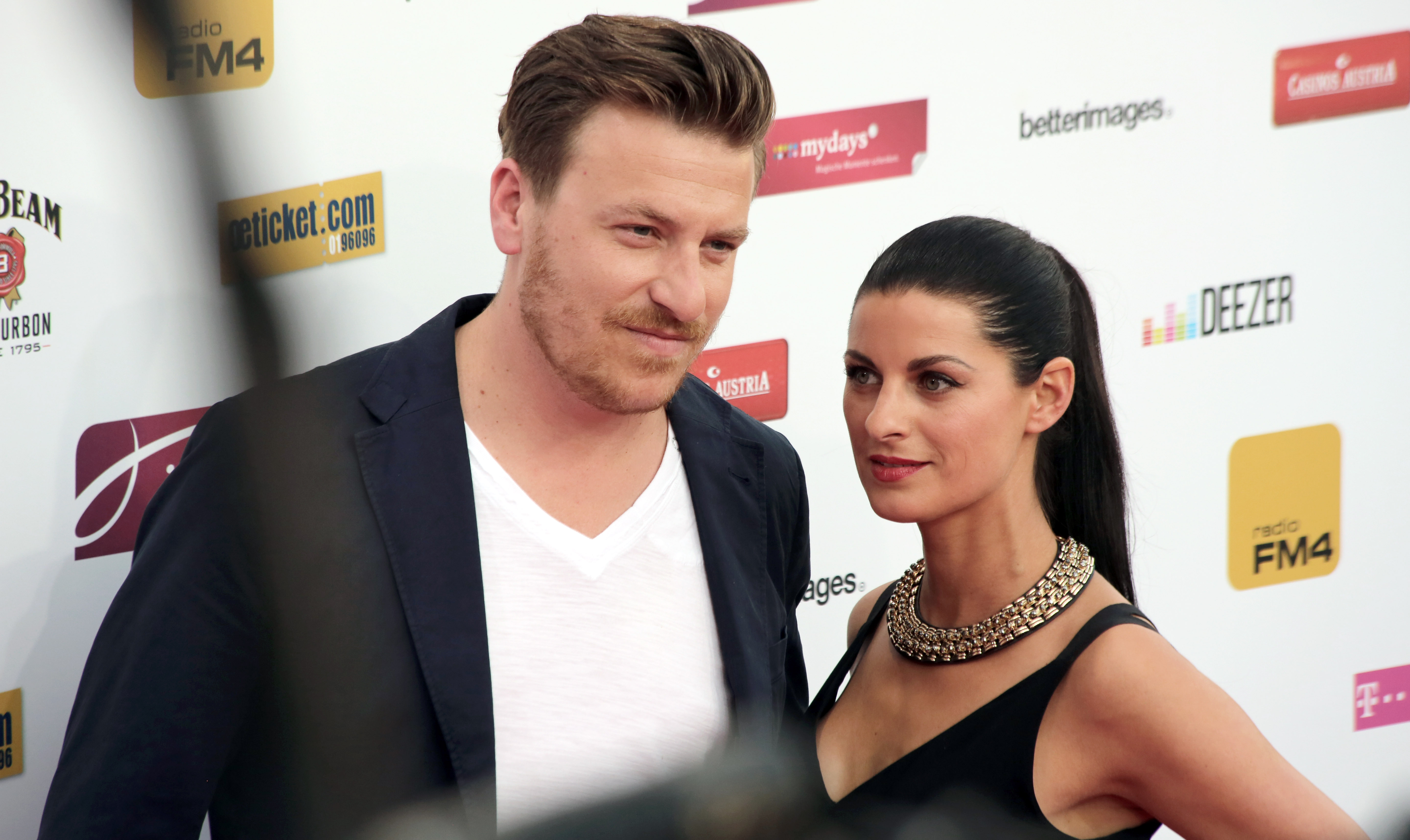
Stelar and Lilja Bloom in 2013

Stelar was married to Barbara Lichtenauer (better known by her stage name Lilja Bloom), with whom he co-founded the design label Stelarbloom. Stelar and Bloom divorced in early 2020.

== Discography ==
=== Albums ===
Year	Title	Details	Peak chart positions						Certifications
Year	Title	Details	AUT	FRA	GER	GRE	NLD	SWI	Certifications
2001	Shadow Kingdom	2×12" Vinyl & CD, Bushido Recordings, as Plasma	—	—	—	—	—	—	
2004	Rough Cuts	CD, Etage Noir Recordings	—	—	—	—	—	—	
2005	Seven and Storm	CD, Etage Noir Recordings	—	—	—	—	—	—	
2006	Charleston Butterfly	CD, Etage Noir Recordings	—	—	—	—	—	—	
2007	Shine	CD, Etage Noir Recordings	—	—	—	—	—	—	
2008	Daylight	CD, Rambling Records	—	—	—	—	—	—	
2009	That Swing – Best Of	CD, Etage Noir Recordings	—	—	—	7	—	—	
2009	Coco	CD, Etage Noir Recordings	65	—	—	10	—	—	
2009	Coco, Pt.1	CD, Etage Noir Recordings	—	—	—	—	—	—	
2009	Coco, Pt.2	CD, Etage Noir Recordings	—	—	—	—	—	—	
2010	The Paris Swing Box	CD, Etage Noir Recordings	—	—	—	—	—	—	
2010	La Fete	CD, Etage Noir Recordings	—	—	—	—	—	—	
2012	The Princess	CD, Etage Noir Recordings	4	—	35	8	86	9	IFPI AUT: 2× Gold
2012	The Princess, Pt.2	CD, Etage Noir Recordings	—	—	—	—	—	—	
2013	The Invisible Girl (Parov Stelar Trio)	CD, Etage Noir Recordings	18	—	—	4	—	40	
2013	Parov Stelar & Peter Kreuzer Pres.: Klangwolke 2013	CD, Etage Noir Recordings	—	—	—	—	—	—	
2013	The Art of Sampling	2 CDs, 2 LPs, CD, DD Etage Noir Recordings, Island Records, Universal Music Germany	6	117	35	—	—	27	IFPI AUT: Gold
2015	The Demon Diaries	2x12" LP, CD, Etage Noir Recordings	1	93	8	1	—	9	IFPI AUT: Gold
2016	Live @ Pukkelpop	CD, Etage Noir Recordings	9	—	89	—	—	64	
2017	The Burning Spider	CD, Etage Noir Recordings	1	49	23	—	—	9	IFPI AUT: Gold
2019	Voodoo Sonic Trilogy, Part 1	Etage Noir Recordings	—	—	—	—	—	—	
2020	Voodoo Sonic Trilogy, Part 2	Etage Noir Recordings	33	—	—	—	—	—	
2020	Voodoo Sonic Trilogy, Part 3	Etage Noir Recordings	45	—	—	—	—	80	
2022	Moonlight Love Affair	Etage Noir Recordings	4	—	83	—	—	20	
2025	Artifact	LP, CD, DD, Etage Noir Recordings	5	—	—	—	—	—	

=== Singles and EPs ===
Year	Title	Peak chart positions					Certifications	Album / EP
Year	Title	AUT	FRA	GER	GRE	SWI	Certifications	Album / EP
2009	"Catgroove"	—	—	—	—	—	IFPI AUT: Gold	Coco, Pt. 2
2010	"The Phantom"	69	—	—	—	—		The Phantom EP
2010	"Booty Swing"	—	—	—	—	—	IFPI AUT: Gold	The Paris Swing Box
2012	"Jimmy's Gang"	43	—	—	—	—		Jimmy's Gang EP
2012	"Nobody's Fool" (featuring Cleo Panther)	60	—	—	—	—		The Princess
2013	"The Mojo Radio Gang"	—	72	—	—	—		Coco
2013	"Keep on Dancing" (featuring Marvin Gaye)	45	—	—	—	—		The Art of Sampling
2014	"All Night"	42	46	35	—	57	IFPI AUT: Platinum; BVMI: Platinum; FIMI: 2× Platinum	The Princess
2014	"Clap Your Hands"	52	—	—	—	—		Clap Your Hands
2014	"The Sun" (featuring Graham Candy)	31	110	—	2	—	IFPI AUT: Gold; IFPI GRE: Gold	The Sun EP
2015	"Hooked on You" (featuring Timothy Auld)	—	126	—	—	—		The Demon Diaries
2015	"Six Feet Underground" (featuring Claudia Kane)	—	—	—	—	—		The Demon Diaries
2015	"When I Find My Love" (as Stelartronic and Anduze)	—	97	—	—	—		Non-album singles
2016	"Grandpa's Groove" (with AronChupa)	—	—	—	—	—		Non-album singles
2017	"Step Two" (featuring Lilja Bloom)	—	90	—	—	—		The Burning Spider
2018	"Taking Over" (featuring Krysta Youngs)	—	—	—	—	—		Non-album singles
2018	"Mambo Rap" (featuring Claudia Kane)	—	—	—	—	—		Non-album singles
2018	"Trouble" (featuring Nikki Williams)	—	—	—	—	—		Non-album singles
2019	"Gringo"	—	—	—	—	—		Non-album singles
2019	"Snake Charmer" (with Kovacs)	—	—	—	—	—		Non-album singles
2019	"Go Wake Up" (with Lilja Bloom)	—	—	—	—	—		Voodoo Sonic (The Trilogy, Pt. 1) EP
2020	"Brass Devil"	—	—	—	—	—	IFPI AUT: Gold	Voodoo Sonic (The Trilogy, Pt. 2) EP
2020	"Don't You Forget" (featuring Anduze & Lilja Bloom)	—	—	—	—	—		Voodoo Sonic (The Trilogy, Pt. 2) EP
2020	"Go Wake Up" (with Lilja Bloom)	—	—	—	—	—		Voodoo Sonic (The Trilogy, Pt. 1) EP
2020	"Tango Del Fuego" (with Georgia Gibbs)	—	—	—	—	—		Non-album singles
2020	"Pink Dragon"	—	—	—	—	—		Non-album singles
2020	"Silver Line"	—	—	—	—	—		Non-album singles
2021	"Keine Melodien...1,2,3,4,5" with (Jeans Team)	—	—	—	—	—		Non-album singles
2021	"Chambermaid Mash Up Swing"	—	—	—	—	—		Non-album singles
2022	"Candy Girl" (featuring Vallemarie)	—	—	—	—	—		Non-album singles
2022	"AKH Odessa" (with The Gentlemen Music Club)	—	—	—	—	—		Non-album singles
2022	"Toxic Lover"	—	—	—	—	—		Non-album singles
2022	"Fire"	—	—	—	—	—		Non-album singles
2022	"Gringos Revenge"	—	—	—	—	—		Non-album singles
2023	"Future" (featuring James Deacon)	—	—	—	—	—		Non-album singles
2023	"Breathe" (with Stelartronic)	—	—	—	—	—		Non-album singles
2024	"Boy Met Girl"	—	—	—	—	—		Non-album singles
2024	"Pink Electric Shoes"	—	—	—	—	—		Non-album singles
2024	"In Between" (with Karafizi)	—	—	—	—	—		Non-album singles
2024	"Drum" (with Alle Farben, featuring Lena Sue)	—	—	—	—	—		Non-album singles

== Use of music in film, series and documentaries ==
Production Title	Type	Episode (for series)	Release year	Country of origin	Song(s)
Bob Mackie - Naked Illusions	Documentary		2025	USA	"Chambermaid Swing", "Diamonds", "Red Cat", "Lights Off"
15 Minutes of shame	Documentary		2021	USA	"The Princess"
Ice To Ice - Michael Strasser	Documentary		2020	AUT	"All Night", "Voodoo Sonic", "The Fall"
Always at the Carlyle	Documentary		2018	USA	"Let's Roll", "The Burning Spider", "State Of The Union"
Scatter my ashes at Bergdorf's	Documentary		2012	USA	25 songs featured
The Spy Who Dumped Me	Film		2018	USA	"Six Feet Underground"
Love Machine	Film		2018	AT	"Hooked On You"
Womit haben wir das verdient?	Film		2018	AT	"Jimmy's Gang"
The Wilde Wedding	Film		2016	USA	"Booty Swing", "Chambermaid Swing", "Jimmy's Gang", "Catgroove"
Ray Meets Helen	Film		2016	USA	"La Calatrava", "Jimmy's Gang", "Letoile", "For Rose"
Figjar 2	Film		2015	TR	"All Night", "Milla's Dream"
Samba	Film		2015	FR	"Catgroove"
Traumfrauen	Film		2015	DE	"Hooked On You", "Hit Me Like A Drum", "The Sun", "All Night"
Der perfekte Wurf	Film		2014	DE	"All Night"
Hector's search for happiness	Film		2014	USA	"Room Service"
Weisses Rössl	Film		2013	DE	"Dust In The Summer Rain"
In Vogue: The 1990s	Series		2024	UK	"All Night"
Maestro Blue	Series	Season 2, Episode 203	2024	GR	"The Princess"
Wo wir sind ist oben	Series	Episode 1-8	2024	DE	Multiple songs featured
Valeria	Series	Season 3, Episode 6	2023	ES	"Booty Swing"
Dollface	Series	Episode 201	2022	USA	"Booty Swing", "Libella Swing"
Love 101	Series	Season 2, Episode 203	2021	TR	"The Princess"
Tod von Freunden	Series	Episode 1,3	2021	DE	"The Burning Spider"
The Hills: New Beginnings	Series	Episode 104	2019	USA	"Trouble"

== Awards and achievements ==
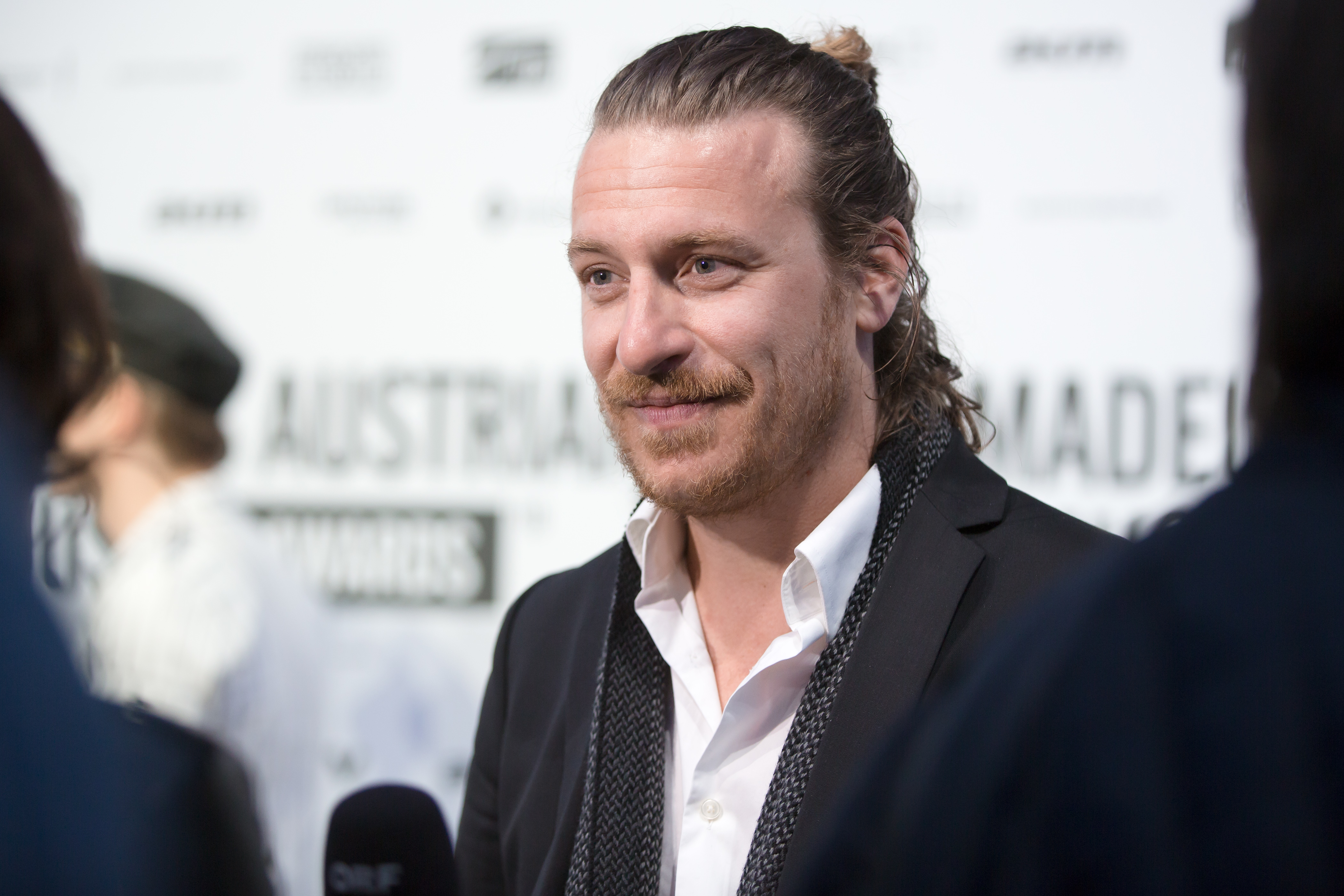
Stelar at the 2016 Amadeus Austrian Music Awards

Stelar has won ten Amadeus Austrian Music Awards (7x Best Dance/Electronic, 2x Best Live Act, 1x Best Album):

- 2012: Electronic/Dance
- 2013: Electronic/Dance
- 2013: Album of the Year for The Princess
- 2013: Best Live Act
- 2014: Best Live Act
- 2015: Electronic/Dance
- 2016: Electronic/Dance
- 2019: Electronic/Dance
- 2020: Electronic/Dance
- 2021: Electronic/Dance

His music has consistently charted, including reaching No. 1 on the US iTunes Electronic Charts with The Sun featuring Graham Candy in May 2018, as well as with the release of Voodoo Sonic Pt. 2 in 2020.

His track All Night achieved double platinum status in Italy in May 2017 for 100,000 units sold, and was later certified platinum in Germany (2023) and Austria (2025).
