= Seven Dreams =

Seven Dreams may refer to:

- Seven Dreams: A Book of North American Landscapes, novel series by William T. Vollmann
- Seven Dreams (album), by Gordon Jenkins (1953)

== See also ==
- Dream 7, 2009 mixed martial arts event
- Dream No. 7, 2001 album by the band Reamonn
- Legend of the Seven Dreams, 1988 album by saxophonist Jan Garbarek
