= Best Days (Anastacia song) =

Single by Anastacia

from the album Our Songs
- Released: April 28, 2023
- Length: 4:32
- Label: Stars by Edel
- Songwriter(s): Andreas von Holst; Andreas Frege; Birgit Minichmayr; Timothy Smith
- Producer(s): Christian Geller

Anastacia singles chronology
| "American Night" (2022) | "Best Days" (2023) | "Supergirl" (2023) |

Music video
- "Anastacia - Best Days (Official Video)" on YouTube

"Best Days" is a song by American recording artist Anastacia. An English language cover of German punk rock band Die Toten Hosen's "Tage wie diese" (2012), it was re-written by Timothy Smith for her eighth studio album Our Songs (2023), a compilation of mostly translated interpretations of German rock songs. Original songwriters Andreas von Holst, Campino, and Birgit Minichmayr are also credited on "Best Days." The song was released as the album's first single on April 28, 2023, by Stars by Edel.

== Background ==
"Best Days" was produced by Christian Geller. Die Toten Hosen's lead vocalist Campino sang the English translation as a demo version. Commenting on his help, Anastacia said in an interview: "He was thrilled that I was singing it and fortunately he likes the version. He's proud and has approved it [...] It's a party song, and I feel that when I sing it. I'm happy to be able to share this with Italians, Brits, Australians. There are so many people who don't even know how great this song is."

== Critical reception ==
Australian online LGBT publication OutInPerth called the song "powerful and uplifting." American Idol and Queen of the Universe contestant Ada Vox commented on social media platform Instagram: "Yes ma’am!!! You never disappoint," while Duncan James of the English group Blue wrote: "Love it."

== Commercial performance ==
"Best Days" debuted at number 70 on the UK Singles Downloads Chart Top 100 on May 5, 2023. On the week of 23 in June 2023, "Best Days" entered Slovakia's Radio Top 100 list at number 95.

== Music video ==
The music video for the song was filmed in Lisbon, Portugal, in March 2023. The music video begins with Anastacia sitting at a café and singing. She soon begins walking the streets of Lisbon and later people join to dance and sing with her at a rooftop of a building. The video was produced by Marcel Brell.

== Track listing ==
Digital download

1. "Best Days" – 4:32

== Charts ==
Chart performance for "Best Days"
| Chart (2023) | Peak position |
|---|---|
| Slovakia (Rádio Top 100) | 95 |
| UK Singles Downloads (OCC) | 70 |
| UK Singles Sales (OCC) | 76 |

== Release history ==
Release dates and formats for "Best Days"
| Region | Date | Format | Label | Ref |
|---|---|---|---|---|
| Various | April 28, 2023 | Digital download; streaming | Stars by Edel | |
