= Reamonn (album) =

Studio album by Reamonn
- Released: 7 November 2008
- Genre: Pop rock
- Length: 50:47
- Labels: Universal; Island
- Producers: Reamonn; Berman Brothers; Brian Howes; Julio Reyes Copello

Reamonn chronology
Wish (2006)	Reamonn (2008)	Reamonn Live (2009)

Singles from Reamonn
- 1. "Open Skies" Released: 11 April 2008; 2. "Through the Eyes of a Child" Released: 10 October 2008; 3. "Million Miles" Released: 13 February 2009; 4. "Set of Keys" Released: 11 May 2009; 5. "Moments Like This" Released: 5 June 2009; 6. "Aeroplane" Released: 13 November 2009

Reamonn is the fifth studio album by the German band Reamonn. In Germany, it was released on 7 November 2008 by Universal Music, while in the United Kingdom it was issued on 28 September 2009. The album marked a comeback for the group following a period in which the members had considered disbanding, before reconciling their differences and returning to the studio. It ultimately became Reamonn’s final studio album, as the band entered a hiatus in 2012.

== Promotion ==
Several singles were released from Reamonn."Open Skies" served as the lead single and was also used as the theme song for the German film The Red Baron (2008); it was released exclusively as a digital download. "Through the Eyes of a Child" followed as the second single. "Million Miles," co-written by Kara DioGuardi, was selected as the third single after fan voting on the band's official website. "Moments Like This" was issued as the fourth single, a faster-paced rock track, while "Aeroplane" became the fifth single, featuring a straightforward rock arrangement. "Set of Keys" was released digitally as the band’s first UK single on 11 May 2009.

== Critical reception ==
Professional ratings
Review scores
Source	Rating
laut.de	2/5 stars

Laut.de editor Tobias Litterst felt that the album was "fundamentally solid" in terms of songwriting and production and that, from a purely musical perspective, there were no truly weak tracks. However, he criticized the record for offering little beyond its mainstream appeal, arguing that it largely delivers what its audience expects while lacking "tension and inspiration" across most of its songs.

== Commercial performance ==
The album achieved strong commercial success across German-speaking Europe. It peaked at number 2 on the German Albums Chart, and reached number 9 in both the Austrian Albums Chart and the Swiss Albums Chart. In terms of certifications, the album was awarded 3× Gold by the Bundesverband Musikindustrie (BVMI) for sales of 300,000 units in Germany, and Gold by the Swiss branch of the International Federation of the Phonographic Industry (IFPI) for 15,000 units.

== Track listing ==
All tracks are written by Reamonn, except where noted.

Reamonn track listing
No.	Title	Length
1.	"Faith"	3:29
2.	"Million Miles" (written by Reamonn, Kara DioGuardi and Emanuel Kiriakou)	3:47
3.	"Through the Eyes of a Child" (music by Reamonn and Julio Reyes Copello)	3:51
4.	"Free Like a Bird" (music by Reamonn and Julio Reyes Copello)	3:06
5.	"Goodbyes" (music by Reamonn, Julio Reyes Copello and Brian Howes)	3:53
6.	"Set of Keys"	4:17
7.	"Moments Like This"	3:46
8.	"Aeroplane"	4:02
9.	"Open Skies"	4:12
10.	"Broken Stone"	4:08
11.	"Serenade Me"	4:42
12.	"Broken" (written by Reamonn and Brodie Stewart)	3:13
13.	"It's Over Now"	3:57
Total length:		50:47

== Personnel ==
- Rea Garvey – vocals, guitar
- Uwe Bossert – guitar
- Sebastian Padotzke – keyboards
- Philipp Rauenbusch – bass guitar
- Gomezz – drums

== Charts ==
=== Weekly charts ===
Weekly chart performance for Reamonn
Chart (2009)	Peak position
Austrian Albums (Ö3 Austria)	9
German Albums (Offizielle Top 100)	2
Swiss Albums (Schweizer Hitparade)	9

=== Year-end charts ===
Year-end chart performance for Reamonn
Chart (2009)	Position
German Albums (Offizielle Top 100)	43

== Certifications ==
Certifications for Reamonn
Region	Certification	Certified units/sales
Germany (BVMI)	3× Gold	300,000^{^}
Switzerland (IFPI Switzerland)	Gold	15,000^{^}
^{*} Sales figures based on certification alone.^{^} Shipments figures based on certification alone.

== Release history ==
Reamonn release history
Region	Date	Format(s)
Germany	7 November 2008	Digital download; CD
United Kingdom	28 September 2009	Digital download; CD
