= Graham Candy =

New Zealand singer and actor (born 1991)

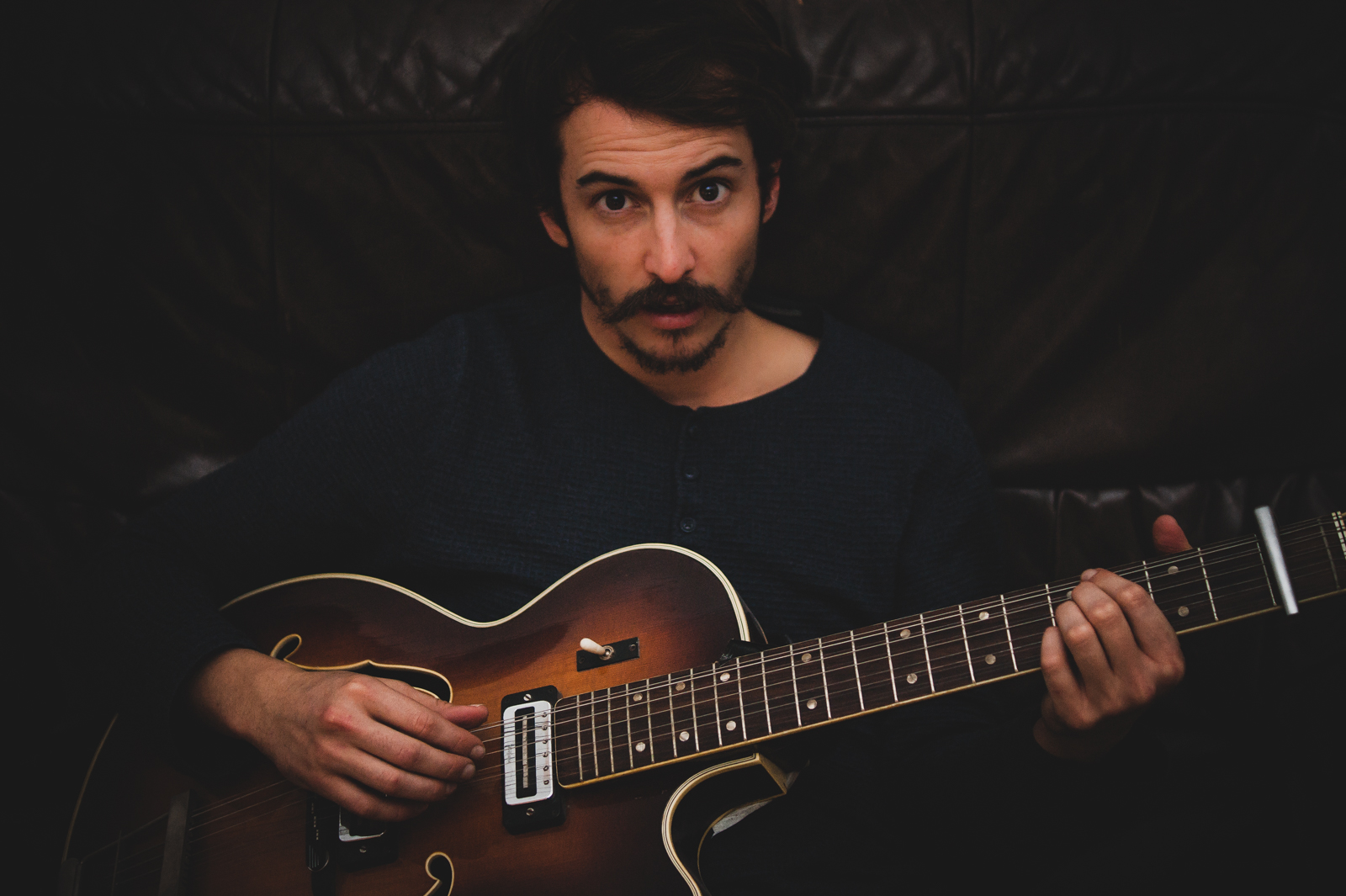
- Graham Candy at Riverside Studios Berlin in 2015

Background information
- Born: Graham James Candy; 1 April 1991 (age 35); Auckland, New Zealand
- Genre: indie pop
- Occupations: Singer, singer-songwriter, actor
- Instruments: Vocals, guitar
- Years active: 2012—present
- Label: Crazy Planet Records
- Website: grahamcandymusic.com

Graham James Candy (born 1 April 1991) is a singer-songwriter and actor from New Zealand. In 2013 he moved to Berlin, Germany to begin his music career.

Candy’s first collaboration with German DJ and producer Alle Farben, "She Moves" (2014), gained him quick popularity with his quirky, high-range vocals, as well as his first gold single. He is currently signed with BMG Rights Management and the Berlin-based label Crazy Planet Records. In 2014, Candy also made his feature-film debut with a lead role in Queen of Carthage, alongside Keisha Castle-Hughes and Shiloh Fernandez.

== History ==
=== Early life ===
Born and raised in Auckland, Candy is the youngest of four children. His artistic career was established at a young age through a combination of music, dance and acting. Candy started Ballroom and Latin dancing at the age of 6 and with his dance partner, went on to gain titles as juvenile, junior and youth champion in both New Zealand and Australia. At age 12, Candy was introduced to the film industry as the photo double for the character "Edmund" in The Chronicles of Narnia – The Lion The Witch and The Wardrobe. Candy attended Rangitoto College where his love of the arts was cultivated. He was part of the school's winning team at the National Stage Challenge competition, a member of the National Champions barbershop choir, and winner of AMI Showdowns "best supporting actor" for his role in the high school production "Seussical". At aged 17, Candy went on a school exchange to Saint Ann's School, Brooklyn to further develop his creative talents. In 2007 Candy played Troy in NYTC's production of Disney's High School Musical - which became the fastest selling locally produced show in Auckland to that date. In 2008, Candy gave songwriting a go, and entered the Play It Strange songwriting competition for secondary school students. His song "Lasts Forever" was awarded 7th place. Mike Chunn – the founder of Play it Strange has helped direct Candy's music career ever since.

=== 2009–2012 ===
In 2009, Candy stopped dancing to study acting, but at the end of the year he left to pursue music with band "The Lost Boys". In the 2009 New Zealand Battle of the Bands, they reached the top ten with their song "Hot Air Balloon". After accepting a role in the short film Go the Dogs, directed by Jackie van Beek, Candy returned to film and the stage gaining two NAPTA "best supporting actor" awards for his roles in the stage production of Footloose and Spring Awakening. Shortly after, Shiloh Fernandez (Evil Dead, Red Riding Hood) was introduced to Candy and he was signed for his first lead role in a feature film as Candy in Queen of Carthage, directed by Mardana Mayginnes.

Candy commenced his solo music career in 2012 by playing in Auckland's bars and pubs. He helped establish live music venue, The Portland Public House as the in-house musician and event manager. Candy immersed himself in the local music community and was given this opportunity to play for audiences that included the likes of Everclear and the Black Keys, and play with musicians including Mumford and Sons and Daniel Bedingfield. In January 2013, Rachael Watson (Spin 33 Records) introduced Candy to Matthias Müller of Crazy Planet Records (Germany), which led to a solo career in Germany.

=== 2013–2014 ===
Since relocating to Berlin, Candy has collaborated with the German indie-pop band Abby, DJ Alle Farben and electro-swing musician Parov Stelar. His melodies have received positive reviews with the release of his first single "13 Lords", and his featured vocals on Parov Stelar's "The Sun". He achieved prominence with his vocals featured on two tracks, "She Moves" and "Sometimes", on Alle Farben's debut album "Synthesia". "She Moves" peaked at #9 in Germany and was moderately successful in Austria, Switzerland, Netherlands and Belgium. The single was remixed by Bakermat and Goldfish. Candy's debut EP was released in 2014.

=== 2015–Present ===
On 4 March 2016, Candy released his first single off his debut album Plan A called "Back Into It". Plan A was scheduled to be released on 6 May 2016.

== Discography ==
=== Albums ===
- Plan A (2016)

=== Singles ===
==== As lead artist ====
- "13 Lords" (2014)
- "Holding Up Balloons" (2015)
- "Back Into It" (2016)

==== As featured artist ====
Year	Title	Peak positions							Album
Year	Title	GER	AUT	BEL (Fl)	FRA	NLD	SPA	SWI	Album
2014	"She Moves (Far Away)" (Alle Farben featuring Graham Candy)	9	15	43	173	21	41	21	Alle Farben album Synesthesia — I Think in Colours
2014	"The Sun" (Parov Stelar featuring Graham Candy)	—	31	—	110	—	—	—	Parov Stelar EP; The Sun EP
2015	"4 Life" (Robin Schulz featuring Graham Candy)	—	—	—	—	—	—	—	Non-album singles
2018	"Real Love" (Thomas Gold featuring Graham Candy)	—	—	—	—	—	—	—	Non-album singles
2020	"Gold" (Syn Cole featuring Graham Candy)	—	—	—	—	—	—	—	Non-album singles
"—" denotes a recording that did not chart or was not released.

==== Other appearances ====
Year	Title	Artist	Track listing
2014	Synesthesia — I Think in Colours Chart success: Album peaked at GER: #20, AUT: #54, SWI: #40	Alle Farben	Tracks featured: No. / Title / Length; 4. / "She Moves" (Alle Farben featuring Graham Candy) / 3:17; 7. / "Sometimes" (Alle Farben featuring Graham Candy) / 3:24; 14. / "She Moves (Far Away)" (Bakermat Remix) (Alle Farden featuring Graham Candy) / 5:23; 15. / "She Moves (Far Away)" (Goldfish Dub Mix) (Alle Farben featuring Graham Candy) / 7:18
2014	Clap Your Hands EP [Etage Noir Recordings]	Parov Stelar	Track featured: No. / Title / Length; 3. / "The Sun" (Parov Stelar featuring Graham Candy) / 2:54
2014	The Sun EP	Parov Stelar	Tracks featured: No. / Title / Length; 1. / "The Sun" (featuring Graham Candy) / 2:54; 2. / "The Sun" (featuring Graham Candy) (Stelartronic Remix) / 6:57; 3. / "The Sun" (featuring Graham Candy) (Gamper & Dadoni Remix) / 4:25; 4. / "The Sun" (featuring Graham Candy) (LCAW Remix) / 6:12; 5. / "The Sun" (featuring Graham Candy) (D3ltron Remix) / 4:40
2015	Sugar	Robin Schulz	Track featured: No. / Title / Length; 12. / "4 Life" (featuring Graham Candy) / 3:15

== Filmography ==
- 2004: Photo double for the character "Edmund" in The Chronicles of Narnia — The Lion The Witch and The Wardrobe
- 2011–13: Shorts: Go the Dogs / Harrowing of Hell / Asyrinthium / Inoganic
- 2012: Queen of Carthage as Graham
- 2012: Cirque du Soleil: Worlds Away
- 2013: Power Rangers Megaforce (TV Series, as a singer in the episode Dream Snatcher)
