= She Moves (Far Away) =

Single by Alle Farben featuring Graham Candy

from the album Synesthesia - I Think in Colours
- Released: 2 May 2014
- Genre: Ambient techno, folktronica
- Length: 3:04
- Label: Sony Music
- Songwriters: Frans Zimmer, Graham Candy, Jan Hammele, Andreas Huber
- Producers: Frans Zimmer, Jan Hammele, Andreas Huber

Alle Farben singles chronology
"Tempelhof EP" (2014)	"She Moves (Far Away)" (2014)	"Supergirl" (2015)

Graham Candy singles chronology
"She Moves (Far Away)" (2014)

Music video
- "She Moves (Far Away)" on YouTube "She Moves (Far Away) (Street Video)" on YouTube

"She Moves (Far Away)" is the 2014 debut single by German DJ and producer Alle Farben from his debut album Synesthesia - I Think in Colours and features the vocals of Graham Candy. It was released on Sony Music. The song was co-written by Frans Zimmer (real name of Alle Farben), Graham Candy, Jan Hammele and Andreas Huber.

== Music video ==
Two different music videos have been released for the song.

The first one, released on 8 April 2014 and dubbed "Street Video", includes footage of thousands of people attending a DJ event featuring Alle Farben (Frans Zimmer) on the tarmac of the phased out Berlin Tempelhof Airport, dancing to his tunes while flashes of colour are splashed all across the screen, a tribute to his name meaning "all colours" and as a reference to the debut Synesthesia album (full title Synesthesia - I Think in Colours).

The official video, directed by Franck Trebillac, depicts Graham Candy travelling on a bike to reach his lover, who is dancing at an Indian party. On his way he passes through different lands and climates and cycles past Alle Farben, disguised each time as someone different (a peasant, a skier or a runner). At the end of the video Candy eventually reaches the girl in an Indian-like land and dances with her.

== Charts ==
The single has charted in a number of European charts including a top 10 showing on the German Singles Chart.

=== Chart performances ===
Chart (2014)	Peak position
Austria (Ö3 Austria Top 40)	15
Belgium (Ultratop 50 Flanders)	43
Belgium (Ultratop 50 Wallonia)	47
Czech Republic Singles Digital (ČNS IFPI)	99
France (SNEP)	173
Germany (GfK)	9
Germany (Airplay Chart)	10
Hungary (Dance Top 40)	7
Hungary (Rádiós Top 40)	1
Hungary (Single Top 40)	4
Netherlands (Dutch Top 40)	15
Netherlands (Single Top 100)	21
Poland (Dance Top 50)	38
Poland (Polish Airplay New)	2
Slovenia (SloTop50)	8
Spain (Promusicae)	41
Switzerland (Schweizer Hitparade)	21

=== Year-end charts ===
Chart (2014)	Position
Germany (Official German Charts)	36
Hungary (Dance Top 40)	36
Hungary (Rádiós Top 40)	18
Hungary (Single Top 40)	40
Netherlands (Dutch Top 40)	77
Netherlands (Single Top 100)	78
Chart (2015)	Position
Hungary (Dance Top 40)	56

== Certifications ==
Region	Certification	Certified units/sales
Germany (BVMI)	Platinum	300,000^{‡}
Hungary (MAHASZ)	Gold	1,500^{‡}
Italy (FIMI)	Gold	15,000^{‡}
^{‡} Sales+streaming figures based on certification alone.
