= Synesthesia – I Think in Colours =

Studio album by Alle Farben
- Released: 2014
- Recorded: 2012–2014
- Genre: EDM; dance
- Label: Sony Music
- Producer: Frans Zimmer

Alle Farben chronology
Synesthesia – I Think in Colours (2014)	Music Is My Best Friend (2016)

Singles from Synesthesia
- 1. "She Moves (Far Away)" Released: 2 May 2014

Synesthesia – I Think in Colours is the 2014 debut album of German DJ and music producer Alle Farben released on Sony Music.

== Overview ==
The album was released on 25 May 2014 in Germany and European markets through Kallias record label and Sony Music. The 15-track album includes collaborations with a number of artists, namely Graham Candy featured on two tracks, Lydmor also on two tracks and Sway Clarke II on one track. It also includes two bonus remixes "She Moves" by Bakermat and Goldfish.

On April 15, 2014, Alle Farben released "She Moves (Far Away)" featuring the vocals of Graham Candy as a prerelease and debut single from the debut album.

== Track listing ==
1. "Intro" – 2:38
2. "Leaves" – 3:32
3. "Down" – 4:44
4. "She Moves" (featuring Graham Candy) – 3:17
5. "Synesthesia" – 6:28
6. "Blue" – 4:34
7. "Sometimes" (featuring Graham Candy) – 3:24
8. "Because of You" (featuring Lydmor) – 3:49
9. "On and On" (featuring Lydmor) – 3:25
10. "Lonely Land" (featuring Sway Clarke II) – 3:24
11. "Face to Facebook" – 4:02
12. "D. Punk" – 4:05)
13. "Metaphysik der Röhren" – 6:56
14. "She Moves (Far Away)" Bakermat Remix (feat. Graham Candy) – 5:23 (bonus)
15. "She Moves (Far Away)" Goldfish Dub Mix (feat. Graham Candy) – 7:18 (bonus)

== Chart performance ==
Chart (2014)	Peak position
Austrian Albums (Ö3 Austria)	54
German Albums (Offizielle Top 100)	20
Swiss Albums (Schweizer Hitparade)	40
