= Queen of Carthage =

- Film poster
- Directed by: Mardana M. Mayginnes
- Written by: Mardana M. Mayginnes; Shiloh Fernandez
- Produced by: Colin Michael Day; Shiloh Fernandez
- Starring: Shiloh Fernandez
- Cinematography: Jacob Bryant
- Edited by: Scott Roon
- Music by: Brian Byrne
- Distributed by: ARC Entertainment
- Release date: 22 August 2014 (Montreal)
- Running time: 92 minutes
- Country: New Zealand
- Language: English

Queen of Carthage is a 2014 New Zealand thriller drama film starring Shiloh Fernandez. In addition to acting in the film, Fernandez served as screenwriter and producer.

== Plot ==
A young American man flees from a traumatic relationship with his sister, and travels to New Zealand to find a better life. He falls in love when he watches a singer perform at a cafe.

== Cast ==
- Shiloh Fernandez as Amos
- Keisha Castle-Hughes as Simi
- Graham Candy as Graham
- Amanda Tito as Phoenix
- Astra McLaren as Jane
- Josh McKenzie as Phoenix's Brother
- Toby Lawry as Frank
- Colin Michael Day as Jamey
- Rose McIver as Jane (voice)

== Release ==
The film made its world premiere at the Montreal World Film Festival on 22 August 2014.
