= Raise Your Hands =

Live album by Reamonn
- Released: 10 September 2004 (Germany)
- Recorded: 2004
- Genre: Pop rock
- Length: 70:49
- Label: EMI / Virgin Music

Reamonn chronology
Beautiful Sky (2003)	Raise Your Hands (2004)	Wish (2006)

Raise Your Hands is a live album by the German band Reamonn. It was released on 10 September 2004. The album was published in 2004 by Virgin Music Germany. All tracks were written by Rea Garvey, Mike Gommeringer, Uwe Bossert, Philipp Rauenbush and Sebastian Padotzke. The track with the most international success was "Star".

== DVD ==
Following the release of the album, a two-disc live DVD was released on 22 October 2004.

== Track listing ==
1. "Stripped" — 3:27
2. "Swim" — 5:15
3. "Star" — 5:30
4. "Strong" — 5:09
5. "Supergirl" — 4:09
6. "Place of No Return (In Zaire)" — 4:37
7. "Promised Land" — 5:29
8. "Life Is a Dream" — 5:35
9. "Pain" — 6:58
10. "Josephine" — 4:26
11. "Beautiful Sky Intro" — 3:06
12. "Beautiful Sky" — 4:50
13. "Alright" — 9:50
14. "Sunshine Baby" (feat. Maya) — 4:04

== Charts ==
Chart performance for Raise Your Hands
Chart (2004)	Peak position
Austrian Albums (Ö3 Austria)	33
German Albums (Offizielle Top 100)	7
Portuguese Albums (AFP)	25
Swiss Albums (Schweizer Hitparade)	20
