= Wish (Reamonn album) =

2006 studio album by Reamonn

Studio album by Reamonn
- Released: 21 April 2006
- Recorded: 2006
- Genre: Pop rock
- Length: 49:31
- Label: Universal Music/Island
- Producer: Greg Fidelman

Reamonn chronology
Raise Your Hands (2004)	Wish (2006)	Reamonn (2008)

Singles from Wish
- 1. "Promise (You and Me)" Released: 24 March 2006 (Germany); 2. "Tonight" Released: 7 July 2006 (Germany); 3. "The Only Ones" Released: 8 December 2006 (Germany); 4. "Serpentine" Released: 25 May 2007 (Germany)

Wish is the fourth studio album by the German pop rock band Reamonn. It was recorded in 2006 and released on 21 April 2006 through Universal Music. All tracks were written by Rea Garvey, Mike Gommeringer, Uwe Bossert, Philipp Rauenbusch and Sebastian Padotzke, the members of Reamonn.

The album was produced in Los Angeles with producer Greg Fidelman, who had previously worked with Red Hot Chili Peppers and Johnny Cash.

== Singles ==
"Promise (You and Me)" was released as a maxi single from the album on 24 March 2006. It was accompanied by a music video, filmed in Ireland and reminding of a Lord of the Rings scenery. The song has charted in Germany at number 17, in Austria at number 29, and in Switzerland at number 35.

"Tonight" was released as the second single on 7 July 2006. The song charted at number 11 in Germany, number 28 in Austria, and at number 20 in Switzerland.

"The Only Ones" was the third single to promote the album, released on 8 December 2006. It featured Lucie Silvas. The song charted at number 23 in Germany, number 26 in Austria, and number 32 in Switzerland. The single contained a B-side titled "Never Lettin' Go (Good Times)".

"Serpentine" was the fourth and final single from the album, released on 25 May 2007. It featured Lenny Castro on shakers. "Serpentine" charted at number 38 in Germany, and number 66 in Austria.

== Commercial performance ==
In Germany, the album spent 15 weeks on the charts peaking at number 2. In Switzerland, it reached number 2, spending a total of 33 weeks on the charts. In Austria, it peaked at number 13 during a 15-week stay on the chart.

== Track listings ==
Standard edition
No.	Title	Length
1.	"Wish"	3:44
2.	"Starship"	3:16
3.	"Serpentine"	4:03
4.	"Promise (You and Me)"	4:25
5.	"She's a Bomb"	3:01
6.	"Tonight"	3:34
7.	"Just Another Night"	5:04
8.	"Starting to Live"	3:20
9.	"L.A. Skies"	4:02
10.	"Sometimes"	4:05
11.	"Come to Me"	3:21
12.	"Out of Reach"	3:37
13.	"The Only Ones" (feat. Lucie Silvas)	3:50
Total length:		49:31

Deluxe Edition bonus tracks
No.	Title	Length
1.	"L.A. Rollercoaster"
2.	"Words from Greg Fidelman"
3.	"Starship" (Studio performance)
4.	"The Only Ones" (Studio performance)
5.	"Just Another Night" (Studio performance)
6.	"Promise (You and Me)"
7.	"Promise (You and Me)"

Extended Edition
No.	Title	Length
1.	"Wish"	3:45
2.	"Starship"	3:16
3.	"Serpentine"	4:04
4.	"Promise (You and Me)"	4:25
5.	"She's a Bomb"	3:02
6.	"Tonight"	3:35
7.	"Just Another Night"	5:04
8.	"Starting to Live"	3:20
9.	"L.A. Skies"	4:03
10.	"Sometimes"	4:05
11.	"Come to Me"	3:21
12.	"Out of Reach"	3:37
13.	"The Only Ones"	3:51
14.	"Mother Earth"	3:55
15.	"Never Lettin' Go"	3:07
16.	"The Only Ones" (Single Version)	3:51
17.	"Promise (You and Me)" (Unplugged)	3:28
18.	"Tonight" (Unplugged)	4:04
19.	"Never Lettin' Go (Good Times)" (Unplugged)	3:32

== Personnel ==
Additional musicians

- Lenny Castro – percussion

Technical personnel

- Greg Fidelman – mixing, production
- Mike Terry – engineering
- Jim Monti – engineering
- Dan Monti – additional engineering
- Paul Figueroa – additional engineering, assistant engineering
- Jason Mott – assistant engineering
- Stephen Marcussen – mastering
- Cindi Peters – production coordination

== Charts ==
=== Weekly charts ===
Weekly chart performance for Wish
Chart (2006)	Peak position
Austrian Albums (Ö3 Austria)	13
German Albums (Offizielle Top 100)	2
Swiss Albums (Schweizer Hitparade)	2

=== Year-end charts ===
Year-end chart performance for Wish
Chart (2006)	Position
German Albums (Official Top 100)	28
Swiss Albums (Schweizer Hitparade)	65

== Certifications ==
Region	Certification	Certified units/sales
Germany (BVMI)	Platinum	200,000^{^}
Greece (IFPI Greece)	Gold	7,500^{^}
^{^} Shipments figures based on certification alone.

== Release history ==
The release history of the versions of the album in three published countries.

Version	Label	Release date (2006/2007)	
Version	Label	Germany	Austria / Switzerland
CD (Normal version)	Island	21 April 2006	21 April 2006
Deluxe Edition	Island	21 April 2006	21 April 2006
Ltd. Pur Edition	Island	8 September 2006	5 May 2006
Extended Edition	Island	24 November 2006	24 November 2006
Enhanced Edition	Universal/Island	9 February 2007	5 March 2007
Live DVD	Island	1 June 2007	1 June 2007

== Wish Live ==
Wish Live

Live album by Reamonn
- Released: 1 June 2007
- Recorded: 2006; Germany
- Genre: Pop rock

Wish Live is a live album, released in Germany, Austria and Switzerland on 1 June 2007 in the CD/DVD format. It contained twelve tracks and one bonus track. It was recorded during the 2006 Wish Tour in Germany. Lucie Silvas toured with Reamonn during the Wish Tour, and performed solo and with the band.

=== Track listing ===
No.	Title	Length
1.	"Intro" (Live)	0:43
2.	"Starting to Live" (Live)	4:02
3.	"Come to Me" (Live)	5:06
4.	"Promise (You and Me)" (Live)	4:51
5.	"Wish" (Live)	3:47
6.	"Starship" (Live)	5:26
7.	"Tonight" (Live)	5:17
8.	"Sometimes" (Live)	5:49
9.	"Out of Reach" (Live)	4:58
10.	"She's a Bomb" (Live)	6:35
11.	"Serpentine" (Live)	7:38
12.	"The Only Ones" (Live)	4:47
13.	"Allright" (Bonus track, B-Stage, Live)
