= Tonight (Reamonn song) =

Single by Reamonn

from the album Wish
- B-side: "Mother Earth"
- Released: 7 July 2006 (Germany)
- Recorded: 2005
- Genre: Pop rock
- Length: 3:36
- Label: Universal Music/Island
- Songwriters: Rea Garvey; Uwe Bossert; Sebastian Padotzke; Philipp Rauenbusch; Mike Gommeringer
- Producer: Greg Fidelman

Reamonn singles chronology
"Promise (You & Me)" (2006)	"Tonight" (2006)	"The Only Ones" (2006)

"Tonight" is a pop rock song by the German band Reamonn. It was released on 7 July 2006 from their fifth studio album Wish.

== Track listing ==
CD single

1. "Tonight" — 3:36
2. "Mother Earth" — 3:54

== Charts performance ==
The song reached the top 20 in Germany (#11), on the European charts (#11), and in Switzerland (#20). It was a number-one song in Greece and Romania for six weeks.

=== Weekly charts ===
Chart (2006–2007)	Peak position
Austria (Ö3 Austria Top 40)	28
CIS Airplay (TopHit)	3
Germany (GfK)	11
Germany Airplay (BVMI)	1
Greece (IFPI Greece)	1
Hungary (Rádiós Top 40)	27
Romania (Romanian Top 100)	1
Russia Airplay (TopHit)	3
Switzerland (Schweizer Hitparade)	20
Ukraine Airplay (TopHit)	36

2011 weekly chart performance for "Tonight"
Chart (2011)	Peak position
Ukraine Airplay (TopHit)	92

2015 weekly chart performance for "Tonight"
Chart (2015)	Peak position
Ukraine Airplay (TopHit)	17

Chart (2022−2025)	Peak position
Greece International (IFPI)	9
Moldova Airplay (TopHit)	38
Romania Airplay (TopHit)	183

=== Year-end charts ===
Chart (2006)	Position
CIS (TopHit)	6
Germany (Official German Charts)	43
Russia Airplay (TopHit)	10
Chart (2007)	Position
CIS (TopHit)	34
Russia Airplay (TopHit)	14

2011 year-end chart performance for "Tonight"
Chart (2011)	Position
Ukraine Airplay (TopHit)	162

2012 year-end chart performance for "Tonight"
Chart (2012)	Position
Ukraine Airplay (TopHit)	155

=== Decade-end charts ===
Decade-end chart performance for "Tonight"
Chart (2000–2009)	Position
CIS Airplay (TopHit)	3
Russia Airplay (TopHit)	3

== Certifications ==
Certifications for "Tonight"
Region	Certification	Certified units/sales
Germany (BVMI)	Gold	150,000^{‡}
Streaming
Greece (IFPI Greece)	Platinum	2,000,000^{†}
^{‡} Sales+streaming figures based on certification alone.^{†} Streaming-only figures based on certification alone.

== See also ==
- List of Romanian Top 100 number ones of the 2000s
