= Promise (You and Me) =

Single by Reamonn

from the album Wish
- A-side: "Promise (You and Me)"
- B-side: "Starting To Live"
- Released: 24 March 2006 (Germany)
- Recorded: 2006
- Genre: Pop rock
- Length: 3:56
- Label: Island / Universal Music
- Songwriter: Reamonn
- Producer: Greg Fidelman

Reamonn singles chronology
"Sunshine Baby" (2004)	"Promise (You and Me)" (2006)	"Tonight" (2006)

Music video
- "Promise (You and Me)" on universal-music.de

Promise (You and Me) is a pop rock single by the German band Reamonn. It was recorded by Island Records for the album Wish! and released on 24 March 2006. The song was written by Rea Garvey, Uwe Bossert, Mike Gommeringer, Philipp Rauenbusch and Sebastian Padotzke.

== Track listing ==
Maxi single Germany
No.	Title	Notes	Length
1.	"Promise (You and Me)"	Single Version	3:56
2.	"Promise (You and Me)"	Naked Truth Version	3:28
3.	"Starting To Live"	Album Version	3:22
4.	"Promise (You and Me)"	Video	4:03

== Charts ==
Chart (2006/2007)	Peak position
Austrian Singles Chart	29
German Singles Chart	17
Swiss Singles Chart	35
