= Through the Eyes of a Child =

Single by Reamonn

from the album Reamonn
- B-side: "It's Over Now"
- Released: 10 October 2008 (Germany)
- Recorded: 2008
- Genre: Rock
- Length: 3:51
- Label: Universal / Island
- Songwriter: Reamonn
- Producer: Julio Reyes Copello

Reamonn singles chronology
"Open Skies" (2008)	"Through the Eyes of a Child" (2008)	"Million Miles" (2009)

"Through the Eyes of a Child" is a single from the German band Reamonn. The song is from their fifth studio album, Reamonn. It was released on 10 October 2008 in Germany by Universal under the Island label.

== Music video ==
In the video, one sees the world, but drawn by children, and it is being destroyed and getting worse and worse. Parents are shown quarrelling, while whole woods are being cleared, military tanks are shooting, and icebergs are defrosting due to global warming. Cut in between these scenes, members of the band fade in and out.

== Background ==
The song is a foretaste from the end of 2008 appearing album "Reamonn". It becomes in it the change of complex things if one sees that with the eyes of a child. Probably is, that the text Rea Garvey simply fell to write, because he has a young daughter.

== Track listing ==
=== CD single ===
The German "2er Track" (CD single):

1. "Through the Eyes of a Child" — 3:42
2. "It's Over Now" — 4:07

== Charts ==
The song has reached the top 10 in Germany (#6) and the top 15 in Switzerland (#15) and Austria (#13).

=== Weekly charts ===
Chart (2008)	Peak position
Austria (Ö3 Austria Top 40)	13
Germany (GfK)	6
Germany Airplay (BVMI)	1
Hungary (Editors' Choice Top 40)	39
Switzerland (Schweizer Hitparade)	15

=== Year-end charts ===
Chart (2008)	Position
Germany (Official German Charts)	49
Switzerland (Schweizer Hitparade)	94
