= Moments Like This (Reamonn song) =

Single by Reamonn

Single by Reamonn

from the album Reamonn
- A-side: "Moments Like This"
- B-side: "The Island"
- Released: 5 June 2009 (Germany)
- Recorded: 2008
- Genre: Pop rock
- Length: 3:46
- Songwriter(s): Reamonn
- Producer(s): Julio Reyes Copello

Reamonn singles chronology
"Million Miles" (2009)	"Moments Like This" (2009)	"Aeroplane" (2009)

Music video
- Music with lyrics on YouTube

"Moments Like This" is the fourth single of the pop rock album Reamonn. It was recorded in 2008 by the German band Reamonn. It was released on 5 June 2009 in Germany by Island Records and Universal Music. The song is written by Rea Garvey, Uwe Bossert, Mike Gommeringer, Philipp Rauenbusch and Sebastian Padotzke.

== Music video ==
Rea Garvey in the video

The video was made in Munich in a Green Screen Studio for four weeks. The music in the video is a little bit different than the Album version.

The video is set in a fictitious world. All band members are seen in it. The video sometimes agrees with the songext: if “…like a bird on a wing.” is song, birds fly top down.

== Track listing ==
All tracks are written by Reamonn

CD single Germany
No.	Title	Notes	Length
1.	"Moments Like This"	New Version	3:46
2.	"The Island"	Live version of a Paul Brady-Cover	5:49

== Charts ==
=== Weekly charts ===
Chart (2009)	Peak position
Austria (Ö3 Austria Top 40)	53
Germany (GfK)	19

=== Year-end charts ===
Chart (2009)	Position
Germany (Official German Charts)	96
