= Million Miles (Reamonn song) =

Single by Reamonn

from the album Reamonn
- A-side: "Million Miles"
- B-side: "Stay"
- Released: 13 February 2009 (Germany)
- Recorded: 2008
- Genre: Pop-Rock
- Length: 3:47
- Label: Universal / Island
- Songwriters: Reamonn; Kara DioGuardi; Emanuel Kiriakou
- Producer: Brian Howes

Reamonn singles chronology
| "Through the Eyes of a Child" (2008) | "Million Miles" (2009) | "Moments Like This" (2009) |

"Million Miles" is the third single from Reamonns fifth studio album Reamonn. It was released on 13 February 2009 in Germany by Universal Music from the label Island Records. The song is a rock ballad.

== Music video ==
In the video the band Reamonn plays in a wood of a snowy mountain range. A woman (Romanian model Madalina Draghici) runs through this forest and is looking for the band. She finds them at the end of the video.

== Track listing ==
- German CD single: [CD1] (black artwork):
1. "Million Miles" (Radio Edit) – 3:47
2. "Stay" – 3:36
- Germany: [CD2] (gray artwork)
1. "Million Miles" (Radio Edit) - 3:47
2. "Million Miles" (Piano Version) - 4:00

== Charts ==
| Chart (2009) | Peak position |
|---|---|
| Austrian Singles Chart | 30 |
| German Singles Chart | 17 |
| German Airplay Chart | 7 |
| Swiss Singles Chart | 41 |
