= Rea Garvey =

Irish singer and guitarist

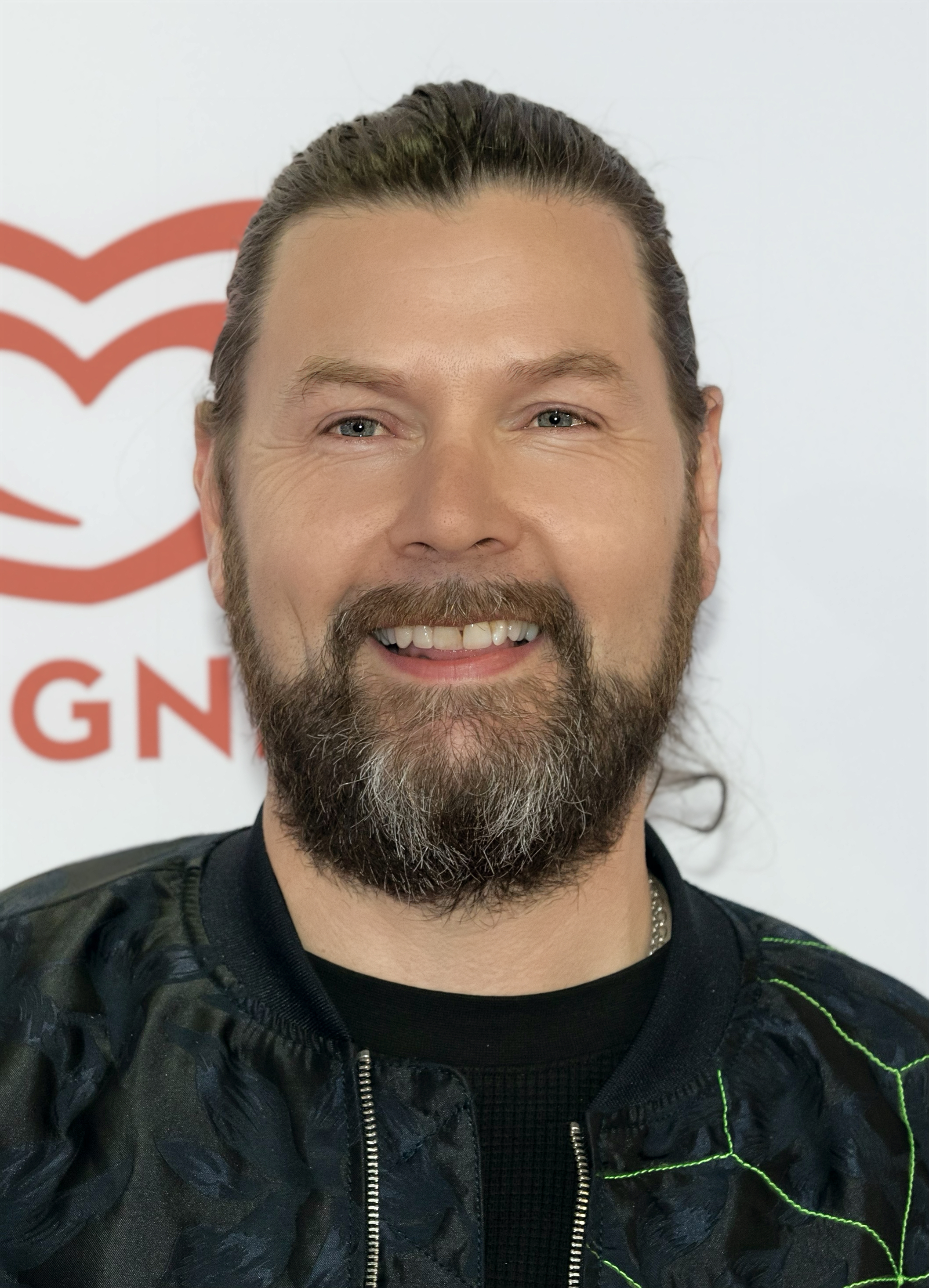
- Rea Garvey during Radio Regenbogen Award 2019 at Europapark

Background information
- Born: Raymond Michael Garvey; 3 May 1973 (age 53); Tralee, Kerry, Ireland
- Origin: Dublin, Ireland
- Genres: Pop rock, alternative rock
- Occupations: Singer, songwriter, musician
- Instruments: Vocals, guitar
- Years active: 1999–present
- Labels: Universal, Island, Virgin
- Member of: The Frames
- Formerly of: Reamonn
- Website: reagarvey.com

Raymond "Rea" Michael Garvey (born 3 May 1973) is an Irish singer, songwriter and guitarist based in Germany. In 1998, he formed the band Reamonn. Over the 11 years that Garvey was their frontman, they saw chart-topping success in Europe, with a number of gold and platinum selling albums, Tuesday, Dream No. 7, Beautiful Sky, Wish and Eleven and several sold out European tours. In 2010, after the release of the band's best-of album/DVD Eleven, and a best-of tour, the band parted ways. Garvey took this time to pursue a solo career, which gave birth to his first solo album Can't Stand the Silence in 2011. This album saw Garvey's transition from anthem rock with Reamonn, to alternative electro-pop.

== Early life ==
Garvey was born on 3 May 1973 in Tralee, Ireland. He is the third of eight children and the only boy. His father works as a police chief, both parents are Catholic and very strict in their upbringing. By his own admission, Rea often went over the top in his youth – taking drugs, occasionally getting into fights, and getting arrested a few times – until he found a more moderate path with music.

== Career ==
=== Frontman ===
Garvey gained his first musical experience as frontman of the Dublin band The Reckless Pedestrians. In 1998, he immigrated to Germany without being able to speak German. In Upper Swabia, Garvey initially stayed with friends. He earned his living as a T-shirt salesman and roadie at music festivals.

At the same time, he placed an ad in the newspaper looking for people to join him in a band. Together with drummer Mike Gommeringer, keyboardist and saxophonist Sebastian Padotzke, guitarist Uwe Bossert and bassist Philipp Rauenbusch, he founded the band Reamonn in November of the same year. The band's name is derived from the Irish version of Garvey's first name, Réamonn. In June 1999, the band signed its first record deal.

In March 2000, the band Reamonn released their first single: "Supergirl" reached number four in the charts in Germany and Austria. In Switzerland, the song also made it into the top ten. The debut album Tuesday followed two months later. It reached number five on the German album charts. This is followed by over 200 sold-out concerts and two further albums (Dream No. 7, 2001 and Beautiful Sky, 2003), which achieved gold and platinum status.

=== Solo work ===
Garvey began working as a solo artist during his time with Reamonn and since then has written songs for a variety of acts, including Paul van Dyk, Jam and Spoon, Roger Cicero and The BossHoss. Rea has also collaborated with Apocalyptica, In Extremo, Nelly Furtado, Mary J Blige, Jam & Spoon, The BossHoss and ATB. In 2005, Rea collaborated with Nelly Furtado on the track "All Good Things (Come to an End)", for her 2006 album, Loose. The two also toured together in France and the Netherlands during 2007.

Garvey first showed his fascination with electronic music in 2001, on the title track "Be Angeled" for the movie Loveparade. This was the first of many collaborations with the DJ team Jam and Spoon. The song was performed for the first time in memory of Mark Spoon at the start of the Love Parade in July 2006. In 2007, Rea appeared on a track titled "Let Go" for Paul van Dyk's album In Between. Rea has also worked on a solo collaboration with Xavier Naidoo, with whom he recorded Falco's song "Jeanny" in 2002 and "My Child" for his solo debut album Can't Stand the Silence in 2011. The latter was a multi-platinum success, following the break-up with his former band Reamonn in early 2011.

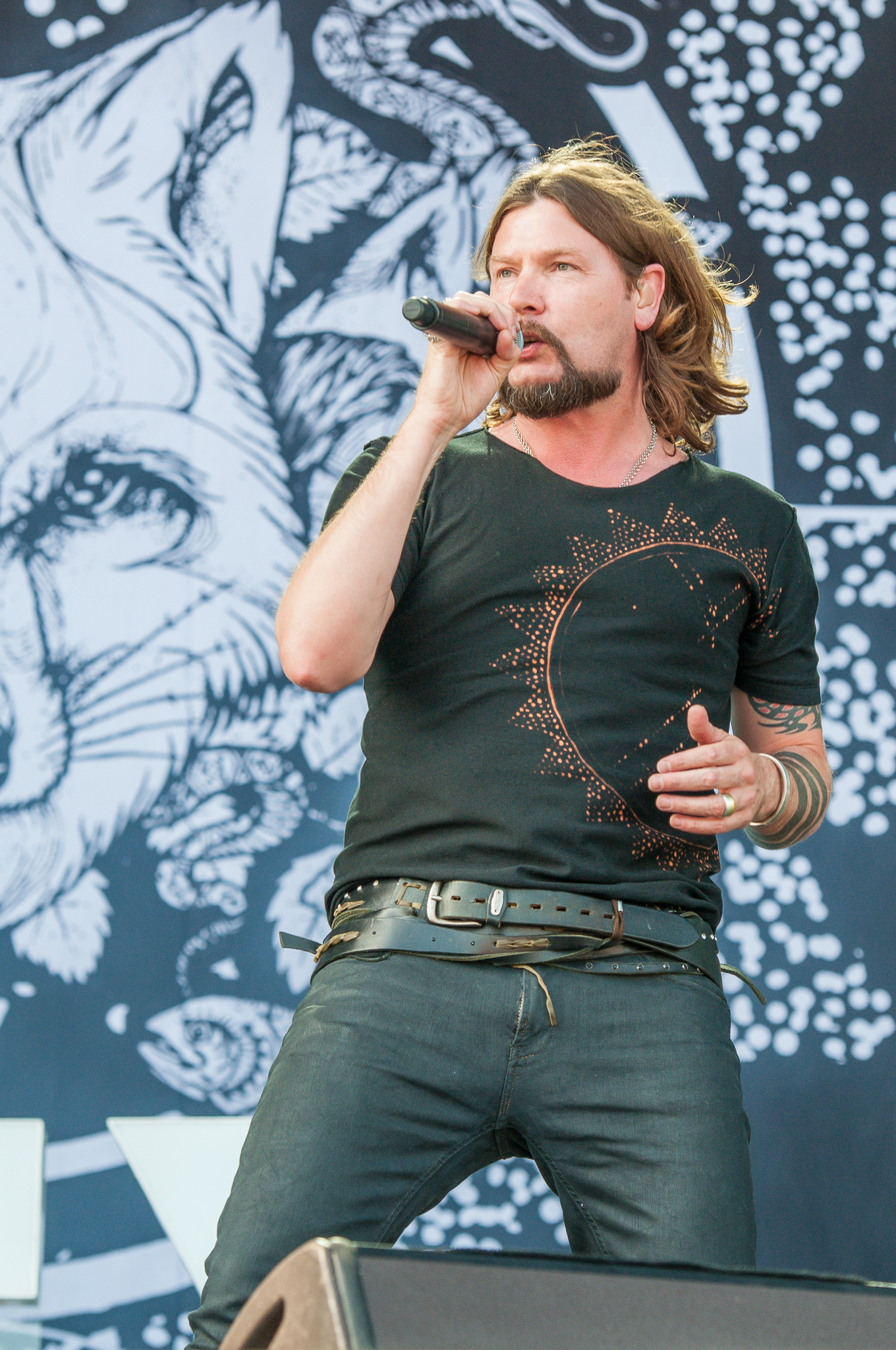
Garvey at Rock im Park 2014

Garvey has also been featured as one of the four coaches on the German version of The Voice, The Voice of Germany for seasons 1–2, 4–5, 9–10, 12, and 15–present. The winner of the second season was British singer-songwriter Nick Howard, who was on Garvey's team.

In 2005, Garvey together with Xavier Naidoo, Sasha and comedian Michael Mittermeier, paid tribute to the Rat Pack in a live performance called Alive & Swingin', in aid of Garvey's charity organisation, Saving an Angel. Due to its success, the four took to the stage again, in early 2011, to a sold-out tour. As the demand for the German Rat Pack grew, the four continued to tour in 2012 and, with their big band, were set to take another encore in 2014.

Garvey won the 2021 edition of the Free European Song Contest, a spin-off of the Eurovision Song Contest created by the German TV channel ProSieben to have a version of the original contest when the COVID-19 pandemic hit the world. He represented Ireland with his song "The One" placing first with 116 points out of 16 songs.

== Personal life ==
Garvey has been married to Josephine Falticska since 2002. The couple have a daughter, Aamor (born 2005), and a son, whose birth year is unknown. The family lives between Berlin and the Hessian village of Hadamar.

== Discography ==
=== Studio albums ===
List of albums, with selected chart positions and certifications
Title	Album details	Peak chart positions			Certifications
Title	Album details	AUT	GER	SWI	Certifications
Can't Stand the Silence	Released: 30 September 2011; Label: Island; Formats: CD, digital download	25	4	23	BVMI: Platinum
Pride	Released: 2 May 2014; Label: Island; Formats: CD, digital download	12	5	9	BVMI: Platinum
Prisma	Released: 2 October 2015; Label: Island; Formats: CD, digital download	13	2	18	BVMI: Gold
Neon	Released: 23 March 2018; Label: Island; Formats: CD, digital download	7	2	7	BVMI: Gold
Hy Brasil	Released: 20 November 2020; Label: Island; Formats: CD, digital download	14	7	7	
Halo	Released: 13 September 2024; Label: Island; Formats: CD, digital download	13	6	6	
Before I Met Supergirl	Released: 31 October 2025; Label: Island; Formats: CD, digital download	72	19	36	
Christmas Calling	Released: 20 November 2026; Label: Island; Formats: CD, digital download	—	—	—	

=== Singles ===
==== As lead artist ====
Year	Title	Peak chart positions			Certifications	Album
Year	Title	AUT	GER	SWI	Certifications	Album
2008	"Hallelujah"	58	—	—		Barfuss soundtrack
2011	"Can't Stand the Silence"	65	17	—	IFPI AUT: Platinum	Can't Stand the Silence
2012	"Colour Me In"	28	12	46		Can't Stand the Silence
2012	"Heart of an Enemy"	—	47	—		Can't Stand the Silence
2012	"Wild Love"	6	18	60	BVMI: Gold	Can't Stand the Silence — The Encore
2014	"Can't Say No"	41	32	49		Pride
2014	"Oh My Love" (featuring Amy Macdonald)	36	35	42		Pride
2015	"It's a Good Life"	—	43	40		Pride
2015	"War"	—	—	—		Prisma
2015	"Armour"	—	86	—		Prisma
2015	"Stronger Than Ever" (MarieMarie & Rea Garvey)	—	85	—		Non-album single
2015	"Fire"	—	—	—		Prisma
2018	"Is It Love?" (featuring Kool Savas)	18	20	12	BVMI: Gold; IFPI AUT: Gold	Neon
2018	"Hometown"	—	—	94		Neon
2018	"Beautiful Life"	—	—	—		Neon
2018	"Kiss Me"	—	91	39		Neon
2019	"Let's Be Lovers Tonight"	—	—	—		Neon
2020	"Talk to Your Body"	—	—	—		Hy Brasil
2020	"Hey Hey Hey"	—	—	—		Hy Brasil
2020	"The One" (featuring Vize)	20	54	—	BVMI: Gold; IFPI AUT: Gold	Hy Brasil
2021	"Rose"	—	—	—		Non-album singles
2021	"Love Makes You Shine" (with YouNotUs & Kush Kush)	—	—	—		Non-album singles
2022	"Best Bad Friend" (with Michael Patrick Kelly)	—	—	—		Non-album singles
2023	"Free Like the Ocean"	—	—	—		Halo
2023	"Perfect in My Eyes"	—	—	—		Halo
2024	"Somewhere Close to Heaven" (with Picture This)	—	—	—		Halo
2024	"Halo"	—	—	—		Halo
2025	"Take This Heart"	—	—	—		Before I Met Supergirl
2025	"Driving Home for Christmas" (with Joy Denalane & Esther Graf)	—	—	—		Non-album single
2025	"Happy Christmas"	61	46	89		Christmas Calling
2026	"Rivers" (with Imran)	—	—	—		Non-album single
2026	"I Wish You Were Here"	—	—	—		Christmas Calling

==== As featured artist ====
Year	Single	Peak chart positions			Certifications	Album
Year	Single	AUT	GER	SWI	Certifications	Album
2001	"Be Angeled" (Jam & Spoon featuring Rea Garvey)	15	16	53		be.angeled soundtrack
2004	"Set Me Free (Empty Rooms)" (Jam & Spoon featuring Rea Garvey)	57	22	—		Tripomatic Fairtales 3003
2006	"Liam" (In Extremo featuring Rea Garvey)	—	51	—		Mein rasend Herz
2006	"All Good Things (Come to an End)" (Nelly Furtado featuring Rea Garvey)	1	1	1	BVMI: Platinum	Loose
2007	"Let Go" (Paul van Dyk featuring Rea Garvey)	—	21	—		In Between
2010	"Each Tear" (Mary J. Blige featuring Rea Garvey)	—	—	—		Stronger with Each Tear
2011	"Heroes" (with Nena, Xavier Naidoo & The BossHoss)	50	28	—		Die Highlights

== Awards ==
- 2010: Echo: In the category Honour Echo for Social Engagement
- 2012: Diva: In the category Music Artist of the Year
