= Alle Farben =

German DJ and record producer (born 1985)

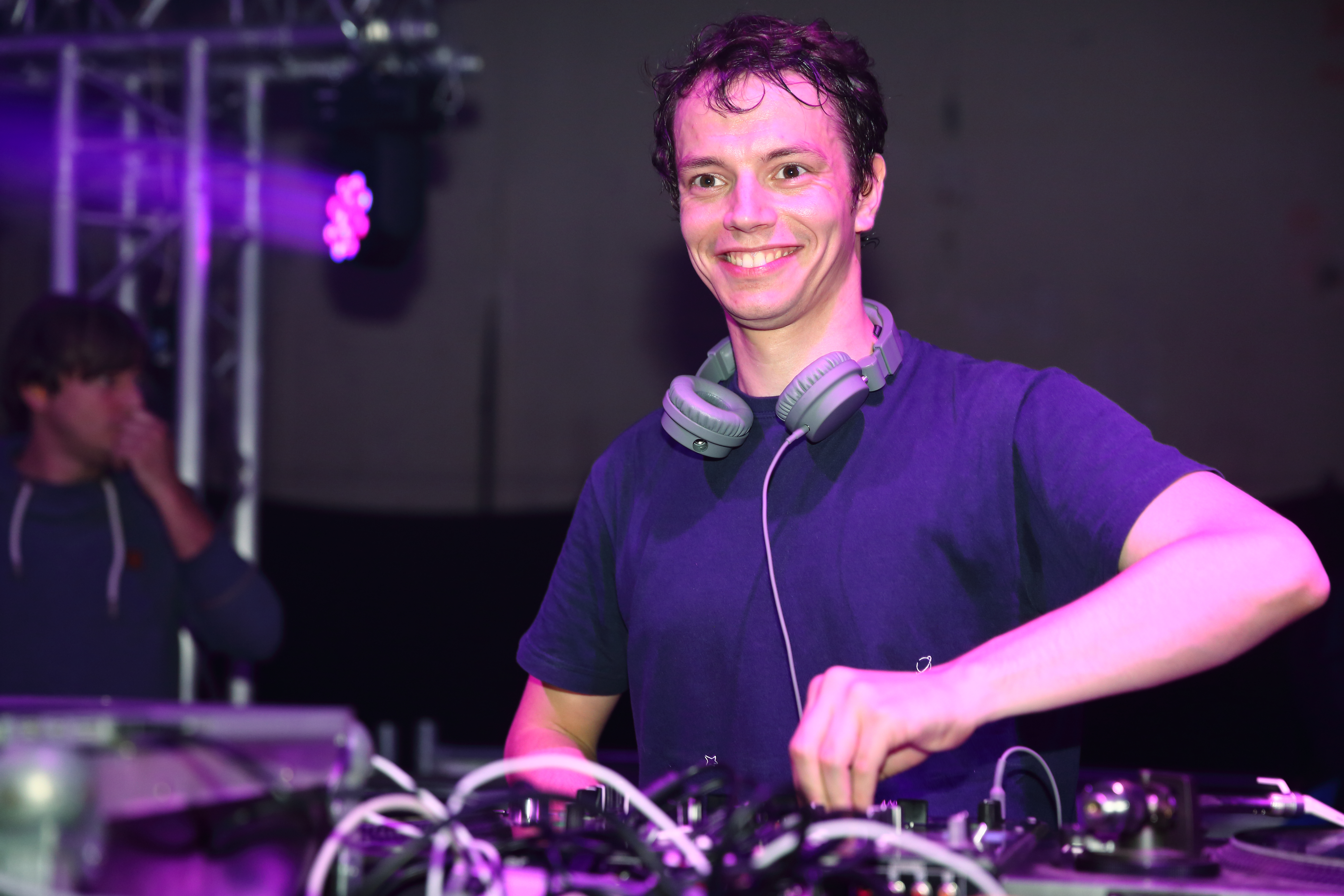
- Alle Farben in 2014

Background information
- Born: Frans Zimmer; 5 June 1985 (age 41)
- Origin: Kreuzberg, West Berlin
- Genres: Future house; tech house; deep house; house; dance-pop
- Occupations: Musician, producer, disc jockey
- Years active: 2010–present
- Label: Guesstimate/b1
- Website: alle-farben.com

Frans Zimmer (born 5 June 1985), better known by his stage name Alle Farben (meaning All Colors in German) is a German DJ and producer. Since 2014 Zimmer is signed to the record label Guesstimate/b1 Recordings and the publishing house Budde Music.

== Career ==
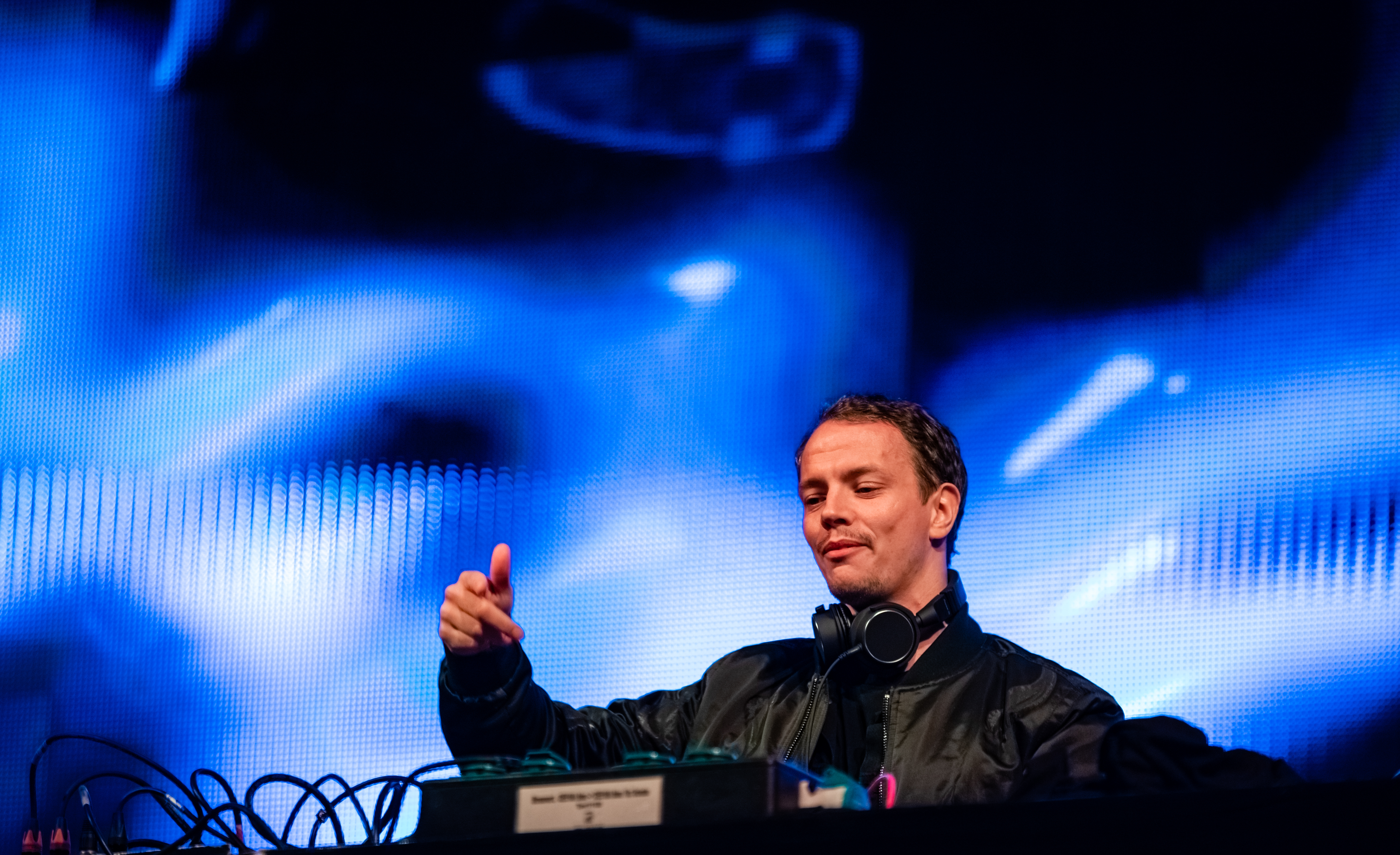
Alle Farben live at Rock am Ring 2019

Frans Zimmer was raised in Berlin's Kreuzberg district, where he lives and works today. After high school, Zimmer wanted to study art, but was not admitted to university. In the following years, he worked various odd jobs, including work as a confectioner in a Berlin café. In 2010, he began DJing in Berlin nightclubs and bars. Inspired by the artist Friedensreich Hundertwasser, he took the alias "Hundert Farben" (meaning Hundred Colours), which he later changed to his current stage name "Alle Farben" (meaning All Colours)

On 9 May 2012 he played for 30,000 people at the former Tempelhof Airport in Berlin. Since then, Zimmer DJs almost every weekend throughout Europe; he also played several shows in Tel Aviv.

In September 2013, Zimmer announced through his Facebook page that he had begun work on his debut album and in January 2014 in an interview with the German newspaper Die Tageszeitung he confirmed the album would be ready in a few months. On 15 April 2014 Alle Farben released "She Moves (Far Away)" featuring the vocals of Graham Candy as a prerelease and the album's debut single. The album, entitled Synesthesia – I Think in Colours as per the official cover and the iTunes download page (with some media outlets opting to use the shorter term Synesthesia album in their coverage of the release), was released on 25 May 2014 in Europe through Kallias record label and Sony Music. Its 15 tracks include collaborations with Graham Candy and Lydmor (on two songs apiece) and Sway Clarke II (on one). It also includes two bonus remixes of "She Moves" by Bakermat and Goldfish. In 2019, Farben collaborated with James Blunt on the single and music video "Walk Away".

== Discography ==
=== Albums ===
Year	Album	Peak positions			Certification
Year	Album	GER	AUT	SWI	Certification
2014	Synesthesia – I Think in Colours	20	54	40	
2016	Music Is My Best Friend	20	—	55	
2019	Sticker on My Suitcase	29	72	67	

=== Singles ===
==== As lead artist ====
Year	Single	Peak positions								Certifications	Album
Year	Single	GER	AUT	BEL (Fl)	BEL (Wa)	FRA	NLD	SPA	SWI	Certifications	Album
2014	"She Moves (Far Away)" (featuring Graham Candy)	9	15	43	47	173	21	41	21	BVMI: Platinum; IFPI SWI: Gold	Synesthesia – I Think in Colours
2016	"Please Tell Rosie" (featuring Younotus)	3	2	—	—	—	—	—	70	BVMI: Platinum; IFPI AUT: Gold	Music Is My Best Friend
2016	"Bad Ideas"	7	4	—	—	—	—	—	79	BVMI: Platinum; IFPI AUT: Gold	Music Is My Best Friend
2017	"Little Hollywood" (with Janieck Devy)	14	8	—	—	—	—	—	31	BVMI: Platinum; IFPI AUT: Gold	Sticker on My Suitcase
2018	"H.O.L.Y." (with Rhodes)	65	54	—	—	—	—	—	—		Sticker on My Suitcase
2018	"Only Thing We Know" (with Kelvin Jones and Younotus)	20	24	—	—	—	—	—	41	BVMI: Gold; IFPI AUT: Gold	Sticker on My Suitcase
2018	"Fading" (with Ilira)	16	16	—	—	—	—	—	17	BVMI: Gold; IFPI AUT: Gold; ZPAV POL: 2× Platinum	Sticker on My Suitcase
2019	"Walk Away" (featuring James Blunt)	98	—	—	—	—	—	—	—		Sticker on My Suitcase
2020	"Kids" (with Vize featuring Graham Candy)	—	—	—	—	—	—	—	—		Non-album singles
2020	"I Love My Friends (And My Friends Love Me)" (with Steve Aoki featuring Icona Pop)	—	—	—	—	—	—	—	—		Non-album singles
2020	"Running Back to You" (with Martin Jensen and Nico Santos)	80	—	—	—	—	—	—	—		Non-album singles
2021	"Lemon Tree" (with Fools Garden)	92	—	—	—	—	—	—	—		Non-album singles
2021	"Somewhere Over the Rainbow/What a Wonderful World" (with Robin Schulz and Israel Kamakawiwoʻole)	82	—	—	48	—	—	—	—		Pink
2021	"Alright" (featuring Kiddo)	37	39	—	—	—	—	—	—	BVMI: Gold	Non-album singles
2022	"Castle" (with Hugel featuring Fast Boy)	—	—	—	—	—	—	—	—		Non-album singles
2022	"Let It Rain Down" (featuring Pollyanna)	78	—	—	—	—	—	—	—		Non-album singles
2024	"Love Hurt Repeat" (with Lewis Thompson featuring Mae Muller)	—	—	—	—	—	—	—	—		Non-album singles
2024	"Call My Name" (featuring Sofiloud)	—	—	—	—	—	—	—	—		Non-album singles
2025	"Flowers" (with Graham Candy and Lahos)	—	—	—	—	—	—	—	—		Non-album singles
2025	"From Disco to Disco" (with Majestic)	—	—	—	—	—	—	—	—		Non-album singles
2025	"Loving You Is Life" (with Cheat Codes featuring JOSEPH)	—	—	—	—	—	—	—	—		Non-album singles
2026	"Body Talk" (featuring René Miller)	—	—	—	—	—	—	—	—		Non-album singles
2026	"Baby Goodbye"	—	—	—	—	—	—	—	—		Non-album singles
"—" denotes a recording that did not chart or was not released.

==== As featured artist ====
Year	Single	Peak positions								Certifications	Album
Year	Single	GER	AUT	BEL (Fl)	BEL (Wa)	FRA	NLD	SPA	SWI	Certifications	Album
2015	"Supergirl" (Anna Naklab featuring Alle Farben & YOUNOTUS)	2	1	33* (Ultratip)	26* (Ultratip)	52	—	52	5	BVMI: Platinum; IFPI AUT: Gold; IFPI SWI: Gold; PROMUSICAE: Gold	non-album single
2018	"Build a House" (Stefanie Heinzmann featuring Alle Farben)	—	—	—	—	—	—	—	38		non-album single

*Did not appear in the official Belgian Ultratop 50 charts, but rather in the bubbling under Ultratip charts.

Others

- 2009: Tanzinteresse
- 2012: Danse / Pulp (with Drauf & Dran) (Kallias Music)
- 2012: Roundabout / Blue Jester (Der Turnbeutel)
- 2012: Galant / Kermit (Kallias Music)
- 2012: Sailorman EP (Kallias Music)
- 2012: Wunderbar / Feeling High (Kallias Music)
- 2013: Tempelhof (Kallias)
- 2014: Sometimes (featuring Graham Candy) (Synesthesia)
- 2015: Get High (featuring Lowell)
- 2015: Pretty Small EP (Alle Farben & YOUNOTUS) (Synesthesia)
- 2016: My Ghost EP (Synesthesia)
- 2016: Remember Yesterday (featuring Perttu & Michael Schulte) (Synesthesia)
- 2016: Fall into the Night (Synesthesia)

=== Remixes ===
- 2011: Rene Bourgeois - Tico (Alle Farben Remix) (Supdub Records)
- 2011: Lizzara & Tatsch - Trompa (Alle Farben Remix) (Ostfunk Records)
- 2012: T.Y.P. - D.I.S.C.O. (Alle Farben Remix) (Polydor / Universal France)
- 2012: Drauf & Dran - Elise (Alle Farben Remix) (Stylerockets)
- 2012: Flapjack - Mister Sandman (Alle Farben Remix) (Stylerockets)
- 2012: Shemian - Classical Symphony (Alle Farben Remix) (Wired UK)
- 2012: K-Paul - Out Of Control (Alle Farben Remix) (Music is Music)
- 2012: Ron Flatter - Herr Lonnert (Alle Farben Remix) (Pour La Vie)
- 2012: Dimitri Andreas - Eida (Alle Farben Remix) (Gold Records)
- 2012: Daughter - Youth (Alle Farben Remix)
- 2013: Ben Ivory - Better Love (Alle Farben Remix) (bitclap!/Warner Music Germany)
- 2013: Blitzkids mvt. - Heart On The Line (Alle Farben Dub Remix) (bitclap!/Warner Music Germany)
- 2013: Tagträumer - The Only Thing In This World (Alle Farben Remix) (Neopren)
- 2013: Alice Francis - Gangsterlove (Alle Farben Remix) (ChinChin Records)
- 2013: Boss Axis - Challenger (Alle Farben Remix) (Parquet Recordings)
- 2013: Parov Stelar - The Snake (Alle Farben Remix) (Island Records / Universal Music Germany)
- 2013: Romeofoxtrott - Memories (Alle Farben Remix) (Hunting For Emotion)
- 2013: Elias - Kaputt (Alle Farben Remix) (Island Records / Universal Music Germany)
- 2014: Bebetta - Herr Kapellmeister (Alle Farben Remix) (Damm Records)
- 2014: Irie Révoltés - Residanse (Alle Farben Remix) (ferryhouse productions)
- 2014: Berlin Comedian Harmonists – Hallo, was machst du heut', Daisy? (Alle Farben Remix) (Deutsche Grammophon)
- 2014: Goldfish – Moonwalk Away (Alle Farben Remix)
- 2014: Hundreds presented by Alle Farben - She Moves & Our Past (Alle Farben Remix) (Synesthesia)
- 2014: Elvis Presley vs. Alle Farben - Shake That Tambourine (Alle Farben Remix) (Sony Music Media)
- 2014: Mø - Walk This Way (Alle Farben Remix) (Chess Club/RCA Victor)
- 2014: The Avener & Phoebe Killdeer - Fade Out Lines (Alle Farben Remix) (Capitol)
- 2015: Heymen - If I Play Your Game (Alle Farben & YOUNOTUS Remix) (Kontor Records)
- 2015: Northern Lite with Aka Aka & Thalstroem - Take My Time (Alle Farben Remix) (Kontor Records)
- 2015: Mantra feat. Lydia Rhodes - Away (Alle Farben Remix) (Ultra Records, LLC)
- 2015: Buray - Istersen (Alle Farben Remix) (b1)
- 2015: Jonah - All We Are (Alle Farben Remix) (Columbia)
- 2016: Teenage Mutants & Laura Welsh - Falling for You (Alle Farben Remix) (Sony Music Entertainment)
- 2016: Hooverphonic - Badaboom (Alle Farben Remix) (epic)
- 2019: Hypanda & IA - Gotta Let Go (Alle Farben Remix)(UMG)
- 2021: R3hab & Jolin Tsai - Stars Align (Alle Farben Remix) (Liquid State)

== Awards and nominations ==
- PARTYSAN Award
  - 2011: in the category Newcomer
- Newcomer Contest Bayern
  - 2012: in the category DJ National
- 1Live Krone
  - 2014: nominated in the category Beste Single
- ECHO
  - 2015: nominated in the category Dance National
- Newcomer Contest Bayern
  - 2015: in the category Vom Newcomer zum Star
