= Beautiful Sky =

Studio album by Reamonn
- Released: 23 May 2003 (Germany)
- Recorded: 2003
- Genre: Pop rock
- Length: 60:00
- Label: EMI / Virgin Music

Reamonn chronology
Dream No.7 (2001)	Beautiful Sky (2003)	Raise Your Hands (2004)

Beautiful Sky is the third studio album by the German band Reamonn. It was recorded in Spain and released on 23 May 2003. The album reached number 3 on the German Albums Chart, and was certified Platinum in Germany.

To promote the album, the band toured with Robbie Williams in Switzerland, Austria, Portugal, Estonia, Latvia and Lithuania.

== Track listing ==
No.	Title	Length
1.	"Intro"	3:03
2.	"Beautiful Sky"	4:04
3.	"Star"	3:55
4.	"Falling Down"	5:19
5.	"Alright"	4:52
6.	"Valentine"	2:51
7.	"Strong"	4:34
8.	"Promised Land"	4:15
9.	"Pain"	5:03
10.	"Angels Fly"	4:37
11.	"Sunshine Baby"	3:19
12.	"A Little Bit of Sunshine"	4:04
13.	"Sold"	4:25
14.	"Back Again" (Bonus Track)	7:35

== Charts ==
=== Weekly charts ===
Chart (2003–2004)	Peak position
Austrian Albums (Ö3 Austria)	39
German Albums (Offizielle Top 100)	3
Polish Albums (ZPAV)	42
Portuguese Albums (AFP)	9
Swiss Albums (Schweizer Hitparade)	16

=== Year-end charts ===
Chart (2003)	Position
German Albums (Offizielle Top 100)	36
Swiss Albums (Schweizer Hitparade)	50
Chart (2004)	Position
German Albums (Offizielle Top 100)	43

== Certifications ==
Region	Certification	Certified units/sales
Germany (BVMI)	Platinum	200,000^{^}
Portugal (AFP)	Gold	20,000^{^}
^{^} Shipments figures based on certification alone.
