= Tuesday (album) =

Studio album by Reamonn
- Released: 29 May 2000
- Recorded: November 1999 – 2000
- Genre: Pop rock
- Length: 55:23
- Label: EMI, Virgin
- Producer: Steve Lyon

Reamonn chronology
Tuesday (2000)	Dream No. 7 (2001)

Singles from Tuesday
- 1. "Supergirl" Released: 27 March 2000; 2. "Josephine" Released: 21 August 2000; 3. "Waiting There for You" Released: 27 November 2000

Tuesday is the first studio album by the pop rock band Reamonn. It was released in 2000 on EMI and Virgin Records. The album was produced by Steve Lyon, and was certified gold in Germany.

== Promotion ==
The first single from the album was "Supergirl". It was certified Gold in Germany, and became the most-played song on German radio in 2000. Reamonn became stars and played at many festivals and concerts. In the latter half of 2000, they went on their own tour to promote the album with support from Heyday. The next singles, "Josephine" and "Waiting There for You", achieved similar success.

== Track listing ==
No.	Title	Length
1.	"7th Son"	4:03
2.	"Supergirl"	4:06
3.	"Swim"	4:11
4.	"If I Go"	5:25
5.	"Josephine"	3:36
6.	"Head in My Hands"	6:00
7.	"She's so Sexual"	3:05
8.	"Torn"	3:19
9.	"Stripped"	3:01
10.	"Waiting There for You"	4:19
11.	"Just a Day" (The song "Just a Day" ends at 6:32. The hidden track "Letter From My Sister" begins at 8:32, after 2 minutes of silence.)	14:27

== Charts and certifications ==
=== Weekly charts ===
Chart (2000–01)	Peak position
Austrian Albums (Ö3 Austria)	10
Dutch Albums (Album Top 100)	92
German Albums (Offizielle Top 100)	5
Polish Albums (ZPAV)	43
Swiss Albums (Schweizer Hitparade)	9

=== Year-end charts ===
Chart (2000)	Position
German Albums (Offizielle Top 100)	29
Swiss Albums (Schweizer Hitparade)	74

=== Certifications ===
Region	Certification	Certified units/sales
Germany (BVMI)	Gold	150,000^{^}
^{^} Shipments figures based on certification alone.
