= Dream No. 7 =

Studio album by Reamonn
- Released: 19 November 2001 (Germany)
- Recorded: 2001
- Venue: Aquapendente
- Studio: Mulino (studios)
- Genre: Pop rock
- Length: 65:19
- Label: Virgin Music
- Producer: Steve Lyon

Reamonn chronology
Tuesday (2000)	Dream No. 7 (2001)	Beautiful Sky (2003)

Dream No. 7 is the second studio album by the German band Reamonn. It was recorded in 2001 and released on 19 November 2001.

The album title comes from the number of the band's former home and rehearsal room in Munzingen, a suburb of Freiburg.

With the single "Weep", Reamonn had a guest appearance in the German film Moonlight Tariff.

== Track listing ==
No.	Title	Length
1.	"Come and Go"	5:02
2.	"La Trieste"	3:57
3.	"Everytime She Goes Away"	5:48
4.	"C Inside"	3:32
5.	"Picture of Heaven"	4:30
6.	"New World"	4:59
7.	"Flowers"	4:40
8.	"Only When You Sleep"	5:37
9.	"Life Is a Dream"	5:00
10.	"Weep / Street Walker"	11:02
11.	"Saving an Angel"	5:33
12.	"Jeanny" (featuring Xavier Naidoo)	5:40

== Charts ==
=== Weekly charts ===
Chart (2001)	Peak position
Austrian Albums (Ö3 Austria)	37
German Albums (Offizielle Top 100)	6
Swiss Albums (Schweizer Hitparade)	26

=== Year-end charts ===
Chart (2001)	Position
German Albums (Offizielle Top 100)	94
