= Supergirl (Reamonn song) =

2000 single by Reamonn

Single by Reamonn

from the album Tuesday
- B-side: "7th Son"
- Released: 27 March 2000
- Genre: Alternative rock
- Length: 4:06
- Label: Virgin
- Songwriters: Rea Garvey; Uwe Bossert; Sebastian Padotzke; Philipp Rauenbusch; Mike Gommeringer
- Producer: Steve Lyon

Reamonn singles chronology
"Supergirl" (2000)	"Josephine" (2000)

Music video
- "Supergirl" on YouTube

"Supergirl" is the debut single from the German band Reamonn. The song is from their first studio album Tuesday. It was written by the complete band and produced by Steve Lyon. The single was released on 27 March 2000 by Virgin Schallplatten and was later certified Gold in Germany. The "Supergirl" in the music video was portrayed by Swiss-Italian actress Soraya Sala.

The song was covered in 2015 by German singer Anna Naklab, and in 2023 by American singer Anastacia for her album Our Songs.

== Track listing ==
CD single

1. "Supergirl" – 3:51
2. "7th Son" – 4:02

== Charts ==
=== Weekly charts ===
Chart (2000–2001)	Peak position
Austria (Ö3 Austria Top 40)	4
Czech Republic (IFPI)	20
Germany (GfK)	4
Netherlands (Dutch Top 40)	3
Netherlands (Single Top 100)	4
Poland (Polish Airplay Charts)	17
Switzerland (Schweizer Hitparade)	10

=== Year-end charts ===
Chart (2000)	Position
Austria (Ö3 Austria Top 40)	30
Europe (Eurochart Hot 100)	91
Germany (Official German Charts)	13
Switzerland (Schweizer Hitparade)	53
Chart (2001)	Position
Netherlands (Dutch Top 40)	12
Netherlands (Single Top 100)	26

=== Certifications ===
Region	Certification	Certified units/sales
Germany (BVMI)	Gold	250,000^{^}
^{^} Shipments figures based on certification alone.

== Anna Naklab version ==
"Supergirl"

Single by Anna Naklab featuring Alle Farben & YOUNOTUS
- Released: 24 April 2015
- Genre: Deep house; chill out; folk
- Length: 3:32
- Label: Raison; B1; Sony
- Songwriters: Rea Garvey; Uwe Bossert; Sebastian Padotzke; Philipp Rauenbusch; Mike Gommeringer
- Producers: YOUNOTUS; Alle Farben

Anna Naklab singles chronology
"Wicked Games" (2013)	"Supergirl" (2015)

Alle Farben singles chronology
"She Moves (Far Away)" (2014)	"Supergirl" (2015)	"Please Tell Rosie" (2016)

YOUNOTUS singles chronology
"Supergirl" (2015)	"Hush" (2015)

Music video
- "Supergirl" on YouTube

In 2015, German singer Anna Naklab released a cover version featuring Alle Farben and YOUNOTUS which gained chart success in Germany too and even outsold the original in the artist's home country. The track has been also remixed by Franz Alice Stern, Daniele Di Martino, Nod One's Head and Stereo Express.

=== Charts ===
Chart (2015–2018)	Peak position
Austria (Ö3 Austria Top 40)	1
Belarus Airplay (Eurofest)	76
Belgium (Ultratip Bubbling Under Flanders)	33
Belgium (Ultratip Bubbling Under Wallonia)	26
Czech Republic Airplay (ČNS IFPI)	2
Czech Republic Singles Digital (ČNS IFPI)	48
France (SNEP)	52
Germany (GfK)	2
Hungary (Dance Top 40)	5
Hungary (Rádiós Top 40)	23
Hungary (Single Top 40)	3
Poland Airplay (ZPAV)	1
Slovakia Airplay (ČNS IFPI)	4
Slovakia Singles Digital (ČNS IFPI)	42
Slovenia (SloTop50)	2
Spain (Promusicae)	52
Switzerland (Schweizer Hitparade)	5
Romania (Airplay Top 100) [27]	27

=== Year-end charts ===
Chart (2015)	Position
Austria (Ö3 Austria Top 40)	14
Germany (Official German Charts)	15
Hungary (Single Top 40)	25
Poland (ZPAV)	12
Slovenia (SloTop50)	26
Switzerland (Schweizer Hitparade)	31
Chart (2016)	Position
Hungary (Dance Top 40)	9
Hungary (Rádiós Top 40)	84
Hungary (Single Top 40)	57
Slovenia (SloTop50)	28
Chart (2017)	Position
Hungary (Dance Top 40)	77
Hungary (Rádiós Top 40)	97
Chart (2024)	Position
Poland (Polish Airplay Top 100)	99

=== Certifications ===
Sales certifications for Supergirl
Region	Certification	Certified units/sales
Austria (IFPI Austria)	Gold	15,000^{‡}
Germany (BVMI)	Platinum	400,000^{‡}
Poland (ZPAV)	Diamond	100,000^{‡}
Spain (Promusicae)	Gold	20,000^{‡}
^{‡} Sales+streaming figures based on certification alone.

== Other versions ==
- In 2001, the Dutch group K-otic recorded their version of the song for their album Bulletproof.
- In 2023, American singer Anastacia recorded "Super Girl" for her album Our Songs. The song was released as a preceding single on July 14, 2023.
