= Reamonn =

German rock band

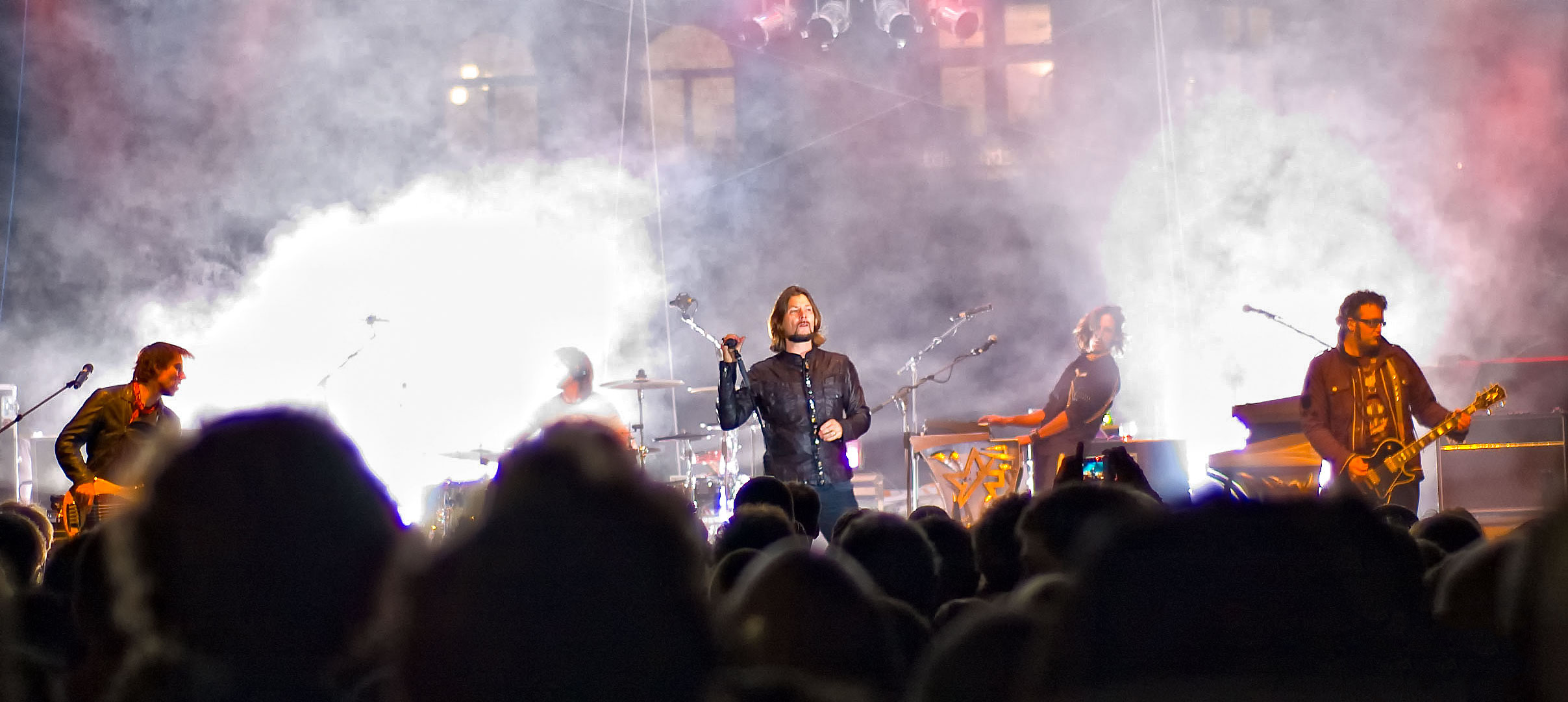
- Reamonn in 2009

Background information
- Origin: Freiburg, Germany
- Genres: Pop rock, alternative rock
- Years active: 1999–2012
- Labels: Universal, Island, Virgin
- Past members: Rea Garvey; Uwe Bossert; Mike "Gomezz" Gommeringer; Philipp Rauenbusch; Sebastian Padotzke
- Website: reamonn.com

Reamonn was a German pop rock band fronted by Irish singer/songwriter Rea Garvey. Formed in 1999, they have recorded and released a total of six full-length studio albums which were highly successful in Germany and also saw some success in other European countries. They gained recognition in 2000 with their song "Supergirl" from their debut album Tuesday. The band has been on an indefinite hiatus since 2012.

== History ==
=== The 1990s: Formation and first contract ===
In 1997, Rea Garvey left his band the Reckless Pedestrians and his hometown of Tralee in Ireland, heading to Germany with little money and a demo CD in his pocket. He put an advertisement in the local paper Stockacher Anzeiger stating, "Singer requires band for recording and live shows". Mike "Gomezz" Gommeringer saw this ad and correctly assumed it must have been Garvey, whose original band he had once seen play live. The two met up and subsequently recruited Uwe Bossert, Sebastian "Sebi" Padotzke and Philipp "Phil" Rauenbusch. Their first gig was played on New Year's Eve 1998 in Stockach. The name Reamonn is taken from an Irish-language form of Rea Garvey's first name Raymond.

In order to secure a recording contract, the band set up a showcase at Logo, a small club in Hamburg, in front of 16 representatives from various record labels in 1999. The band was quickly offered several contracts, settling on signing with Virgin Records Germany. In 2006, they switched to Universal Music.

=== The 2000s: breakthrough with Supergirl ===
Reamonn's first chart success came with "Supergirl," a track that received heavy airplay on mainstream radio stations in Germany, the Netherlands, Switzerland, Austria and Russia. Taken from the album Tuesday, it reached the top 10 in 2000 in each of those countries.

The track "Alright" is another of the signature songs from Reamonn's early period. Performing at the Roxy in Hollywood, California, to impress record executives, the band played the song twice. Alas, the crowd was sparse, as most of the action was at the Viper Room to catch then-hot British talent Jem.

Reamonn never got the U.S. deal, but back in Europe, their popularity continued to soar with a mix of radio-friendly sounds. To date, their most successful international single is "Tonight" from the album "Wish". Released in the summer of 2006, the track hit No. 1 in Romania, but did not crack the top 10 in Germany. The track also opened Reamonn up to new markets, such as Greece and Portugal, where the band continued to receive airplay.

On 7 July 2007, the band performed at the German leg of Live Earth at Hamburg's HSH Nordbank Arena. The same year, Garvey provided vocals for trance DJ Paul van Dyk's song "Let Go".

On 24 July 2008, the group was chosen as the opening act for Barack Obama's speech at the Siegessäule in Berlin, before an estimated crowd of 200,000. The band made the then-US Senator an honorary Reamonn member, presenting him with a band ring.

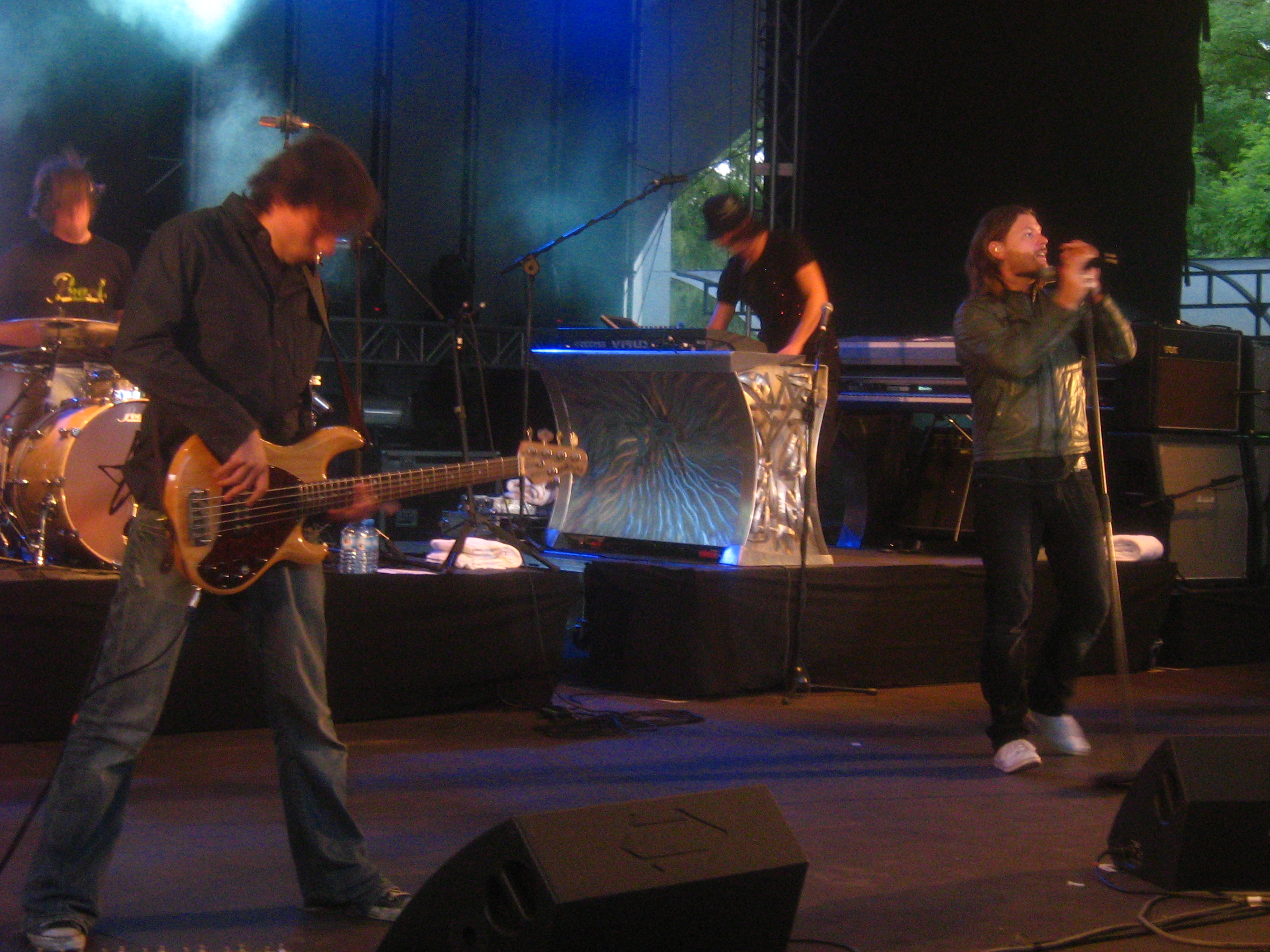
Reamonn in 2008

On 20 December 2008, Reamonn played their song "Faith" as an entrance theme for boxer Nikolai Valuev leading up to his WBA championship fight versus Evander Holyfield in Zürich.

"Faith" was also the official song of the Deutsche Tourenwagen Masters 2009 season.

In November 2009, Reamonn went on a world tour with Status Quo as a backup act.

=== The 2010s: Breakup and new projects ===
On 27 August 2010, Reamonn released their greatest hits album Eleven, which features three new tracks: the new singles "Yesterday", "Colder" and "Let The Morning Sleep". Each of the album's two disks feature 11 songs taken from every album Reamonn have recorded. The deluxe edition features a DVD with videos of the 19 album tracks plus 20 live tracks. In December 2010, Reamonn released their DVD Eleven: Live & Acoustic at the Casino recorded in 2010 at the Kurhaus of Baden-Baden.

Subsequently, the members decided to concentrate on other musical projects. Rea Garvey's first solo single "Can't Stand the Silence" was released on 9 September 2011. The album of the same name was released on 30 September 2011. The following year, Can't Stand the Silence: The Encore Edition was released, featuring several new songs including the single "Wild Love". The tour in support of the album consisted of dates in Germany during 2011 and 2012, and continued in 2013 with dates in Switzerland, France, Ireland, the UK, Austria, Belgium, Luxembourg and the Netherlands. For the 2013 dates, Ryan Sheridan was the supporting act. Rea Garvey released his second solo album Pride in May 2014, featuring the single "Can't Say No". In September 2014, Rea Garvey released the Oh My Love EP, a maxi-single which features the original song from Pride and a new version with Amy Macdonald. Rea Garvey was also a member of the jury for The Voice of Germany for several seasons between 2011 and 2022.

The other members of Reamonn teamed up with Thomas Hanreich, the former frontman of Vivid, to form the band Stereolove. They released their first album Stereo Loves You in September 2012 and their second album Boy A in 2015.

== Members ==
- Lead vocals, guitar: Rea Garvey, born Raymond Michael Garvey on 3 May 1973 (age 53)
- Guitar: Uwe Bossert, born 3 October 1974 (age 51)
- Percussion: Mike "Gomezz" Gommeringer, born 26 September 1973
- Bass: Philipp "Phil" Rauenbusch, born 7 May 1973
- Keyboard, saxophone, flute: Sebastian "Sebi" Padotzke, born 7 August 1971 (age 55)

== Discography ==
- Tuesday (2000)
- Dream No. 7 (2001)
- Beautiful Sky (2003)
- Wish (2006)
- Reamonn (2008)
- Eleven (2010)
