= Not That Kind =

Studio album by Anastacia
- Released: June 16, 2000
- Studios: Cove City Sound Studios (Glen Cove, New York); The Dream Factory (New York City, New York); The Hit Factory Criteria (Miami, Florida); Homesite 13 (Novato, California); The Loft Recording Studios (Bronxville, New York); Minor Productions, Inc. (Los Angeles, California); Universal Music Studios (West Los Angeles, California)
- Genres: Pop; soul; funk
- Length: 50:33
- Labels: Epic; Daylight
- Producers: Louis Biancaniello; Richie Jones; Rickey Minor; Travon Potts; Evan Rogers; The Shadowmen; Carl Sturken; Ric Wake; Sam Watters

Anastacia chronology
Not That Kind (2000)	Freak of Nature (2001)

Singles from Not That Kind
- 1. "I'm Outta Love" Released: February 29, 2000; 2. "Not That Kind" Released: October 2, 2000; 3. "Cowboys & Kisses" Released: January 22, 2001; 4. "Made for Lovin' You" Released: June 25, 2001

Not That Kind is the debut studio album by American singer Anastacia. It was released on June 16, 2000, by Epic Records and Daylight Records. The album brought together multiple established pop, R&B, and adult contemporary production teams, including Ric Wake, Carl Sturken, Evan Rogers, Sam Watters and Louis Biancaniello, with Anastacia also contributing to songwriting, resulting in a stylistically varied album that emphasised her distinctive, gritty vocal delivery while maintaining a cohesive pop-oriented sound despite being recorded across multiple sessions and producers.

The album received mixed reviews, with critics praising Anastacia's expressive and powerful vocals, while some criticised the album's songwriting as inconsistent and overly reliant on familiar pop formulas. Despite these reservations, Not That Kind became one of the year's biggest debuts and a major international commercial success, reaching the top two and top five of the majority of the countries in Europe and Oceania, including Australia, Germany and the UK, also topping the charts in New Zealand and Norway. It ultimately sold over five million copies worldwide.

Not That Kind's singles campaign was led by the international hit, lead single "I'm Outta Love", which reached the top 10 in multiple countries and earned multi-platinum certifications, while the follow-up singles "Not That Kind", "Cowboys & Kisses", and "Made for Lovin' You" achieved more moderate chart success across Europe with generally lower peak positions and limited certification impact. In celebration of its 25th anniversary, Epic Records issued a special edition of the album featuring previously unreleased material, with Anastacia supporting the reissue through the Not That Kind: 25th Anniversary Tour.

== Background ==
Anastacia began her entertainment career in the late 1980s as a dancer, appearing on Club MTV and in music videos such as Salt-N-Pepa's "Get Up Everybody (Get Up)" and "Twist and Shout". After relocating to Los Angeles in 1993, she signed a production deal with Oji Pierce, but was unable to secure a recording contract. In 1998, Anastacia was unemployed after being fired from a Los Angeles beauty salon for "being too loud". Disappointed after years of bad luck in the music industry, she was considering switching to a career in child psychology, when Lisa Braudé, who later became her manager, encouraged her to join the MTV talent show The Cut (1998), hosted by rapper Lisa "Left Eye" Lopes. Anastacia made her way to be one of the ten finalists, performing her own composition entitled "Not That Kind". While the season was won by male-female rap duo Silk-E, Anastacia attracted the interest of record labels after appearing on the shows, having impressed singers Elton John and Michael Jackson as well as the show's judges David Foster and Faith Evans. After being courted by Tommy Mottola, Doug Morris, and Michael Jackson's MJJ Records, in March 1999, she signed a contract with Daylight Records, a custom label of Sony Music Entertainment's Epic Records and began work on her debut album.

Daylight brought together multiple established production teams from the pop, R&B, and adult contemporary fields to work with Anastacia. Among the principal contributors were Ric Wake, duo Carl Sturken and Evan Rogers, and Sam Watters with Louis Biancaniello, who each produced and co-wrote material for the album. Anastacia was also involved in the songwriting process on several tracks, contributing to the development of lyrics and melodies across different sessions. The album was conceived as a stylistically varied project incorporating pop, dance, rock, and R&B elements, with production tailored to highlight Anastacia's distinctive vocal style. Rather than modifying her voice to fit prevailing pop conventions, the production emphasised her powerful, gritty delivery, which she has described as having been discouraged in earlier industry settings. Recording sessions were conducted with different producers over a condensed timeframe, with material later compiled to form a cohesive album sequence. Despite the use of multiple production teams, the final release was structured to maintain a consistent sonic identity, balancing uptempo tracks such as "I'm Outta Love" with ballads and mid-tempo compositions.

== Promotion ==
Not That Kind was promoted heavily across international markets following the breakthrough success of "I'm Outta Love", with Epic Records prioritising Europe and Oceania after strong early airplay and chart performance. The album benefited from sustained media exposure, including television appearances and coordinated promotional campaigns across the United Kingdom, France, Germany, and Australia, where record label executives credited Anastacia's distinctive image and voice with driving strong media interest and audience recognition, with Epic Records executives attributing the album's international breakthrough to a combination of early European enthusiasm, coordinated cross-market promotion, and strong MTV support.

In several European territories, promotion was closely tied to television and video airplay, with heavy rotation of the "I'm Outta Love" music video contributing significantly to its visibility and commercial momentum. Label representatives noted that the project's international rollout was accelerated by its early European success, leading to multiple promotional visits and repeat media campaigns in key markets, particularly France and Germany, where television exposure and music video circulation were identified as key factors in establishing the album, while in Australia and the United Kingdom, radio support and targeted marketing campaigns helped sustain chart performance.

=== Singles ===
"I'm Outta Love" was released as the album's lead single on February 29, 2000. It received acclaim from music critics, many of whom praised its production and Anastacia's vocal performance. A commercial success, it became the biggest-selling song of 2000 in both Australia and New Zealand and reached the top ten on most charts in appeared on. In the United States, the song peaked at number 92 on the US Billboard Hot 100 and spent three weeks on the chart only, though it fared better on Billboard's component charts, reaching number two on the Hot Dance Club Play chart. The song's music video, directed by Nigel Dick, was filmed on location at the Park Plaza Hotel in Los Angeles.

Title track "Not That Kind", originally performed by Anastacia on the MTV talent show The Cut in 1998, was released as the album's second single on October 2, 2000. The song received positive reviews from critics, with many praising its 1980s funk elements. It became a top hit in Italy, Scotland, and Spain and reached the top 20 on several further charts but failed to chart in the US. In France, the "Not That Kind" was awarded a silver certification in 2003. Directed by Marc Webb, the music video for "Not That Kind" was shot in New York City and opens with Anastacia singing the song in a club.

The country-flavored soft rock tune "Cowboys & Kisses" was issued as the album's third single on January 22, 2001. It earned a mixed reception from music critics, and became a moderate commercial success, peaking at number 17 on the Scottish Singles Chart, while also reaching the top thirty in the Netherlands and the United Kingdom as well as the top forty in Italy and Switzerland. Anastacia reteamed with Nigel Dick for the music video for "Cowboys & Kisses" which was filmed at the Camarillo Airport in January 2001 and depicts her as a cowgirl.

"Made for Lovin' You" was released as the album's fourth and final single on June 25, 2001. The uptempo track received positive reviews, and reached number five on the Dutch Top 40 Tipparade. It also peaked at number 27 on both the Scottish Singles Chart and the UK Singles Chart. The music video for "Made for Lovin' You" consists of several live performances, particularly a montage with scenes from her appearance at the Rock am Ring music festival in Germany in 2001.

== Critical reception ==
Professional ratings
Review scores
Source	Rating
AllMusic	4/5 stars
Blender	2/5 stars
The Encyclopedia of Popular Music	4/5 stars
Laut.de	3/5 stars
MTV Asia	8/10
The New Zealand Herald	3/5 stars
The Sydney Morning Herald	3/5 stars

Critics praised Anastacia's expressive vocals, often comparing her to soul and pop divas, but felt the album's material was inconsistent and did not always match the strength of her voice. Tricia Boey from MTV Asia praised Anastacia for her voice which she described as "a blue-eyed-soul version of Tina Turner or Chaka Khan" but felt the material on Not That Kind was "unworthy of it". She called it a "collection of songs that relies on tried and tested pop tactics. But hey, this kind of material is fashionable these days and so this disc may very likely go on to sell billions of records. Too bad they couldn't have matched that stunning voice to more interesting material." Similarly, Russell Baillie from The New Zealand Herald wrote: "While her accompanying multi-producer debut is quite a showcase for the white New Yorker's [...] black, soul-scorch of a voice, it's not anything special in the song department. It doesn't lack for variety, though, managing almost-earthy retro soul-funk, a big rock ballad, too much overblown diva stuff and points in between. No doubt it will prove quite the career-starter, but musically it shows that maybe Mariah divided by Macy doesn't necessarily go."

AllMusic editor William Ruhlmann rated the album four out of five stars. He noted that "Macy Gray demonstrated that a broad audience may respond to an older style if the singer herself is distinguished enough. Anastacia doesn't have the kind of unique timbre that Gray does – in fact, the minute she opens her mouth she starts reminding you of other singers, especially Aretha Franklin – but she is clearly a big talent, and that should count for something." Stephanie Peatling from The Sydney Morning Herald described Not That Kind as a departure from the aggressive pop style of "I'm Outta Love," praising its collection of "soulful ballads" and Anastacia's powerful vocal ability. She highlighted tracks such as "Cowboys and Kisses" as evidence of the album’s effective blend of pop and soul influences. Michael Paoletta of Billboard praised the album for its mix of "pop, dance, rock, and R&B," highlighting Anastacia's ability to blend genres on tracks such as "I'm Outta Love" while also delivering strong power ballads, though he noted that her eclectic style could challenge easy categorisation. Chris Lorraine, writing for Blender, found that "Anastacia's understated vocals give even the clichés of "Black Roses" some plain-spoken credibility. Her throaty voice evokes the anonymous disco-inflected divas of the late '70s, particularly on the Chic-ish "I'm Outta Love." But if Anastacia's alto should prove too conventional for megastardom, her debut suggests there are many more syllables yet to be sung. Hot Press editor Nadine O'Regan gave Not That Kind a negative review, criticising its reliance on clichés and calling Anastacia's genre-blending approach "a weak homage" to other artists, while arguing that the album lacked originality despite its polished production.

== Commercial performance ==
Not That Kind achieved strong commercial success following its release in 2000, establishing Anastacia as an international recording artist. The album performed particularly well across Europe, Oceania, and several major music markets, reaching the top ten on most charts that it appeared on. It peaked at number one on the albums charts in New Zealand, Norway, and Switzerland, reached number two in Denmark, Germany, the Netherlands, and the United Kingdom, while also reaching the top five in markets including Austria, and Ireland. In the United States, the album underperformed though, peaking at number 168 on the US Billboard 200.

The album maintained strong chart longevity, appearing on several year-end charts between 2000 and 2002. In 2000, it ranked highly in multiple territories, including Switzerland (number 3), Australia (number 9), Denmark (number 13), Germany (number 14), Austria (number 14), and the Netherlands (number 17). Its success continued into 2001, with notable year-end placements such as number 3 in the Netherlands and on the European Albums chart, number 7 in Switzerland, number 15 in the United Kingdom, and number 19 in Germany. The album also remained present on year-end charts in 2002, demonstrating sustained sales after its initial release.

Commercially, Not That Kind achieved multi-platinum certifications in several countries. It was certified 3× Platinum in Australia, New Zealand, and Switzerland, 2× Platinum in France, and 5× Gold in Germany. In the United Kingdom, the album reached 3× Platinum status, representing shipments of 900,000 units, while European sales were recognized with a 4× Platinum certification from the International Federation of the Phonographic Industry (IFPI), reflecting 4 million units. Additional platinum certifications were awarded in Austria, Belgium, Denmark, the Netherlands, and Norway, while gold certifications were earned in Finland, Spain, and Sweden.

== Track listing ==
International edition
No.	Title	Writer(s)	Producer(s)	Length
1.	"Not That Kind"	Anastacia; Will Wheaton; Marvin Young	Ric Wake	3:20
2.	"I'm Outta Love"	Anastacia; Sam Watters; Louis Biancaniello	Biancaniello; Watters	4:02
3.	"Cowboys & Kisses"	Anastacia; Jive; Charlie Pennachio	Wake; The Shadowmen	4:41
4.	"Who's Gonna Stop the Rain"	Evan Rogers; Carl Sturken	Rogers; Sturken	5:00
5.	"Love Is Alive"	Gary Wright	Wake; Richie Jones^{[a]}	4:07
6.	"I Ask of You"	Anastacia; Watters; Biancaniello	Biancaniello; Watters	4:27
7.	"Wishing Well"	Jive; Denise Rich; Greg Bieck	Wake	3:57
8.	"Made for Lovin' You"	Anastacia; Watters; Biancaniello	Biancaniello; Watters	3:35
9.	"Black Roses"	Anastacia; Rogers; Sturken; Ray Ruffin	Rogers; Sturken	3:38
10.	"Yo Trippin'"	Anastacia; Travon Potts	Potts	3:35
11.	"One More Chance"	Anastacia; Oji Pierce	Rickey Minor	4:39
12.	"Same Old Story"	Anastacia; Rogers; Sturken	Rogers; Sturken	5:32
Total length:				50:33

Australian enhanced CD bonus videos
No.	Title	Length
13.	"Interview Footage"
14.	"I'm Outta Love" (music video)

Brazilian edition bonus track
No.	Title	Writer(s)	Producer(s)	Length
13.	"I'm Outta Love" (Hex Hector Radio Mix)	Anastacia; Watters; Biancaniello	Biancaniello; Watters; Hector^{[b]}	4:06
Total length:				54:39

Japanese edition bonus tracks
No.	Title	Writer(s)	Producer(s)	Length
13.	"Nothin' at All"	Peter Lord Moreland	Wake	4:29
14.	"I'm Outta Love" (Hex Hector Main Club Mix)	Anastacia; Watters; Biancaniello	Biancaniello; Watters; Hector^{[b]}	7:59
15.	"I'm Outta Love" (Matty's Soulflower Mix)	Anastacia; Watters; Biancaniello	Biancaniello; Watters; Mathias "Matty" Heilbronn^{[b]}	5:56
16.	"I'm Outta Love" (Ron Trent's Club Mix)	Anastacia; Watters; Biancaniello	Biancaniello; Watters; Trent^{[b]}	8:31
Total length:				77:28

US and Canadian edition
No.	Title	Writer(s)	Producer(s)	Length
1.	"Not That Kind"	Anastacia; Wheaton; Young	Wake	3:20
2.	"I'm Outta Love"	Anastacia; Watters; Biancaniello	Biancaniello; Watters	4:02
3.	"Cowboys & Kisses"	Anastacia; JIVE; Pennachio	Wake; The Shadowmen	4:41
4.	"Why'd You Lie to Me"	Anastacia; Damon Sharpe; Greg Lawson; Trey Parker; Damon Butler; Canela Cox	Wake; Jones	3:43
5.	"Who's Gonna Stop the Rain"	Rogers; Sturken	Rogers; Sturken	5:00
6.	"I Ask of You"	Anastacia; Watters; Biancaniello	Biancaniello; Watters	4:27
7.	"Don'tcha Wanna"	Anastacia; Watters; Biancaniello; Stevie Wonder; Yvonne Wright	Biancaniello; Watters	4:01
8.	"Late Last Night"	Diane Warren	Wake	4:27
9.	"Made for Lovin' You"	Anastacia; Watters; Biancaniello	Biancaniello; Watters	3:35
10.	"Black Roses"	Anastacia; Rogers; Sturken; Ruffin	Rogers; Sturken	3:38
11.	"Yo Trippin'"	Anastacia; Potts	Potts	3:35
12.	"One More Chance"	Anastacia; Pierce	Minor	4:39
13.	"Same Old Story"	Anastacia; Rogers; Sturken	Rogers; Sturken	5:32
Total length:				54:40

Notes

- ^{^a} signifies an additional producer
- ^{^b} signifies a remixer

Sample credits

- "Don'tcha Wanna" contains portions of "I Believe (When I Fall in Love It Will Be Forever)" by Stevie Wonder.

== Charts ==
=== Weekly charts ===
Weekly chart performance for Not That Kind
Chart (2000–2001)	Peak position
Australian Albums (ARIA)	2
Australian Dance Albums (ARIA)	1
Austrian Albums (Ö3 Austria)	3
Belgian Albums (Ultratop Flanders)	9
Belgian Albums (Ultratop Wallonia)	10
Danish Albums (Hitlisten)	2
Dutch Albums (Album Top 100)	2
European Albums (Music & Media)	3
Finnish Albums (Suomen virallinen lista)	9
French Albums (SNEP)	6
German Albums (Offizielle Top 100)	2
Hungarian Albums (MAHASZ)	11
Irish Albums (IRMA)	4
Italian Albums (FIMI)	5
New Zealand Albums (RMNZ)	1
Norwegian Albums (VG-lista)	1
Scottish Albums (Official Charts)	2
Spanish Albums (AFYVE)	25
Swedish Albums (Sverigetopplistan)	9
Swiss Albums (Schweizer Hitparade)	1
UK Albums (Official Charts)	2
US Billboard 200	168

=== Year-end charts ===
2000 year-end chart performance for Not That Kind
Chart (2000)	Position
Australian Albums (ARIA)	9
Austrian Albums (Ö3 Austria)	14
Belgian Albums (Ultratop Flanders)	57
Belgian Albums (Ultratop Wallonia)	37
Danish Albums (Hitlisten)	13
Dutch Albums (Album Top 100)	17
European Albums (Music & Media)	19
French Albums (SNEP)	25
German Albums (Offizielle Top 100)	14
New Zealand Albums (RMNZ)	12
Swiss Albums (Schweizer Hitparade)	3

2001 year-end chart performance for Not That Kind
Chart (2001)	Position
Australian Albums (ARIA)	50
Austrian Albums (Ö3 Austria)	23
Belgian Albums (Ultratop Flanders)	27
Belgian Albums (Ultratop Wallonia)	26
Dutch Albums (Album Top 100)	3
European Albums (Music & Media)	3
French Albums (SNEP)	43
German Albums (Offizielle Top 100)	19
Swedish Albums (Sverigetopplistan)	86
Swiss Albums (Schweizer Hitparade)	7
UK Albums (OCC)	15

2002 year-end chart performance for Not That Kind
Chart (2002)	Position
Dutch Albums (Album Top 100)	99
German Albums (Offizielle Top 100)	70

== Certifications ==
Certifications for Not That Kind
Region	Certification	Certified units/sales
Australia (ARIA)	3× Platinum	210,000^{^}
Austria (IFPI Austria)	Platinum	50,000^{*}
Belgium (BRMA)	Platinum	50,000^{*}
Denmark (IFPI Danmark)	Platinum	50,000^{^}
Finland (Musiikkituottajat)	Gold	22,115
France (SNEP)	2× Platinum	600,000^{*}
Germany (BVMI)	5× Gold	750,000^{^}
Netherlands (NVPI)	3× Platinum	240,000^{^}
New Zealand (RMNZ)	3× Platinum	45,000^{^}
Norway (IFPI Norway)	Platinum	50,000^{*}
Spain (Promusicae)	Gold	50,000^{^}
Sweden (GLF)	Gold	40,000^{^}
Switzerland (IFPI Switzerland)	3× Platinum	150,000^{^}
United Kingdom (BPI)	3× Platinum	900,000^{^}
Summaries
Europe (IFPI)	4× Platinum	4,000,000^{*}
^{*} Sales figures based on certification alone.^{^} Shipments figures based on certification alone.

== Release history ==
Not That Kind release history
Region	Date	Format	Edition(s)	Label	Ref.
France	June 16, 2000	CD; cassette	Standard	Sony	
Japan	June 21, 2000	CD; cassette	Standard	Sony	
Italy	June 30, 2000	CD; cassette	Standard	Sony	
Australia	July 7, 2000	CD; cassette	Standard	Sony	
Germany	July 10, 2000	CD; cassette	Standard	Sony	
United Kingdom	October 2, 2000	CD; cassette	Standard	Epic	
United States	March 27, 2001	CD; cassette	Standard	Epic; Daylight	
Europe	June 20, 2016	Vinyl	Standard	Epic; Daylight	
Various	February 28, 2025	CD; vinyl; streaming	25th Anniversary	Epic	

== See also ==
- List of number-one albums from the 2000s (New Zealand)
