= Cowboys & Kisses =

2001 single by Anastacia

Single by Anastacia

from the album Not That Kind
- B-side: "Underdog"; "Nothin' at All"
- Released: January 22, 2001
- Studio: The Dream Factory (New York City)
- Genre: Country pop; soft rock
- Length: 4:32
- Label: Epic; Daylight
- Songwriters: Anastacia; Jive; Charlie Pennachio
- Producers: Ric Wake; The Shadowmen

Anastacia singles chronology
"Not That Kind" (2000)	"Cowboys & Kisses" (2001)	"Made for Lovin' You" (2001)

Music video
- "Cowboys & Kisses" on YouTube

"Cowboys & Kisses" is a song by American singer Anastacia from her debut studio album Not That Kind (2000). Written by Anastacia, Jive, and Charlie Pennachio, the song was released as the album's third single on January 22, 2001, by Daylight Records and Epic Records.

== Critical reception ==
Tricia Boey of MTVAsia.com called this song "a simple, anthem-ic, country-flavoured soft rock tune that doesn't work with Anastacia's voice."

== Music video ==
The music video for "Cowboys & Kisses" was filmed on January 8–9, 2001, at the Camarillo Airport in Camarillo, California. It is Anastacia's second video to be directed by Nigel Dick, who also directed the video for her debut song "I'm Outta Love". In the video, Anastacia is shown driving to an airplane hangar, while a strange unknown man, who is wearing the same ring as Anastacia, is watching her (on the TV screen). At the airport, she is lip-synching the song together with her background singers. While Anastacia is dressed like a cowgirl, the background singers play operators. The unknown man looks at Anastacia and browses through some files about her. At the end, Anastacia sings on an airplane, after which the stranger turns off his TV and Anastacia drives away.

== Track listings ==
- United Kingdom
1. "Cowboys & Kisses" (Tin Tin Out Radio Mix) – 3:56
2. "Cowboys & Kisses" (Radio Edit) – 3:33
3. "I'm Outta Love" (Hex Hector Main Club Mix) – 7:59
4. "Cowboys & Kisses" (Video)
- Cassette
1. "Cowboys & Kisses" (Tin Tin Out Radio Mix) – 3:56
2. "Cowboys & Kisses" (Radio Edit) – 3:33
3. "I'm Outta Love" (Hex Hector Radio Edit) – 4:01
- Italy
1. "Cowboys & Kisses" (Radio Edit) – 3:33
2. "Cowboys & Kisses" (Unplugged Version) – 3:57
3. "Nothin' at All" – 4:28
4. "I'm Outta Love" (A cappella version) - 1:55
- Germany
1. "Cowboys & Kisses" (Album Version) – 4:42
2. "Underdog" – 4:57
3. "Nothin' at All" – 4:28
4. "I'm Outta Love" (A cappella version) – 1:55
- Australia
1. "Cowboys & Kisses" (Radio Edit) – 3:33
2. "Cowboys & Kisses" (Unplugged Version) – 3:57
3. "Underdog" – 4:57
4. "Not That Kind" (Mousse T. Remix) – 3:25
5. "Not That Kind" (Hex Hector Radio Edit) – 3:16

== Charts ==
Weekly chart performance for "Cowboys & Kisses"
Chart (2001)	Peak position
Belgium (Ultratip Bubbling Under Flanders)	5
Belgium (Ultratip Bubbling Under Wallonia)	2
Eurochart Hot 100 (Music & Media)	91
Germany (GfK)	83
Ireland (IRMA)	44
Italy (FIMI)	35
Netherlands (Dutch Top 40)	25
Netherlands (Single Top 100)	42
New Zealand (Recorded Music NZ)	46
Scottish Singles Sales (Official Charts)	17
Switzerland (Schweizer Hitparade)	33
UK Singles (Official Charts)	28

== Release history ==
Release dates and formats for "Cowboys & Kisses"
Region	Date	Format(s)	Label(s)	Ref.
Germany	January 22, 2001	Maxi CD	Sony Music	
France	April 2, 2001	Maxi CD	Sony Music	
United Kingdom	May 21, 2001	Cassette; CD	RCA	
