= Made for Lovin' You (Anastacia song) =

2001 single by Anastacia

Single by Anastacia

from the album Not That Kind
- B-side: "Underdog"; "I Ask of You"
- Released: June 25, 2001
- Studio: Homesite 13 (Novato)
- Length: 3:35
- Label: Epic; Daylight
- Songwriters: Anastacia; Sam Watters; Louis Biancaniello
- Producers: Sam Watters; Louis Biancaniello

Anastacia singles chronology
"Cowboys & Kisses" (2001)	"Made for Lovin' You" (2001)	"Paid My Dues" (2001)

Music video
- "Made for Lovin' You" on YouTube

"Made for Lovin' You" is a song by American recording artist Anastacia from her debut album, Not That Kind (2000). It was released as the album's fourth and final single on June 25, 2001, by Daylight and Epic Records.

== Critical reception ==
Tricia Boey of MTVAsia.com compared this song: "with its synthetic bass lines is another track also streaked with Whitney Houston overtones."

== Composition ==
Written in the key of D♯, "Made For Lovin' You" is mainly based on the chord progression A♯m–G♯–D♯, going to F every 6 bars. Opening with a distorted whispering voice, the song features a heavy synth bassline, with other sounds including a basic keyboard and brass hits. The bridge's chord sequence changes to G♯–D♯–A♯, before building up to the final chorus. The Tin Tin Out mix includes a break in the final chorus in which all the instruments except percussion drop out for 8 bars, leaving the vocals reminiscent of a gospel choir. The song ends with a fade-out.

== Music video ==
The video consists of several live performances Anastacia had given since her debut. It is a montage with scenes from Rock am Ring, a music festival from Germany where Anastacia performed in 2001. The video also includes footage from concert performances from the Netherlands, UK and other public appearances.

== Track listing ==
- United Kingdom
1. "Made for Lovin' You" – 3:35
2. "Made for Lovin' You" (Tin Tin Out radio mix) – 3:52
3. "Underdog" – 4:57
4. "Made For Lovin' You" (video)
- UK cassette single
1. "Made for Lovin' You" – 3:35
2. "Made for Lovin' You" (Tin Tin Out radio mix) – 3:52
3. "Underdog" – 4:57
- France
1. "Made for Lovin' You" – 3:35
2. "I Ask Of You" – 4:27
- Spain
1. "Made for Lovin' You" – 3:35
2. "I'm Outta Love" (Hex Hector radio edit) – 4:01

== Charts ==
Weekly chart performance for "Made for Lovin' You"
Chart (2001)	Peak position
Belgium (Ultratip Bubbling Under Wallonia)	7
Eurochart Hot 100 (Music & Media)	91
France (SNEP)	72
Ireland (IRMA)	36
Netherlands (Dutch Top 40 Tipparade)	5
Netherlands (Single Top 100)	79
Scotland Singles (Official Charts)	27
UK Singles (Official Charts)	27

== Release history ==
Release dates and formats for "Made for Lovin' You"
Region	Date	Format(s)	Label(s)	Ref.
France	June 25, 2001	CD	Epic; Daylight	
United Kingdom	August 13, 2001	Cassette; CD	Epic; Daylight	
