= Not That Kind (song) =

2000 single by Anastacia

Single by Anastacia

from the album Not That Kind
- B-side: "Black Roses"; "Nothin' at All"
- Released: October 2, 2000
- Studio: The Dream Factory (New York City); Cove City Sound (Glen Cove, New York)
- Genre: Funk
- Length: 3:20
- Label: Epic; Daylight
- Songwriters: Anastacia; Will Wheaton; Marvin Young
- Producer: Ric Wake

Anastacia singles chronology
"I'm Outta Love" (2000)	"Not That Kind" (2000)	"Cowboys & Kisses" (2001)

Music video
- "Not That Kind" on YouTube

"Not That Kind" is a song by American recording artist Anastacia from her debut album, Not That Kind (2000). Written by Will Wheaton, Marvin Young and Anastacia, the song was performed originally on the MTV talent show The Cut in 1998, which in turn helped the singer receive a record deal. The song was released as the album's second single on October 2, 2000, by Daylight Records and Epic Records, reaching the top 20 in nine European countries.

== Critical reception ==
William Ruhlmann of AllMusic marked this song as a highlight and wrote: "funk style reminiscent of Aretha Franklin's '80s work."

== Music video ==
Directed by Marc Webb, the music video for "Not That Kind" was shot in New York City. It opens with Anastacia singing the song in a club. There are also shots of Anastacia in a cafe, shown that she is chatting with her girlfriend. Other times, her boyfriend is trying to hit on her, but she teases him away to show him that she is "not that kind of girl".

== Track listings ==
US maxi-CD single

1. "Not That Kind" (album version) – 3:20
2. "Not That Kind" (Kerri Chandler mix – radio edit) – 3:46
3. "Not That Kind" (Maurice Joshua's Chickenpox mix) – 3:33
4. "Black Roses" – 3:38
5. "I'm Outta Love" (video)

UK CD single

1. "Not That Kind" (album version) – 3:20
2. "Not That Kind" (Kerri Chandler vocal mix) – 6:52
3. "Not That Kind" (Maurice's Chicken Pox club mix) – 7:32
4. "Not That Kind" (video version)

UK cassette single

1. "Not That Kind" (album version) – 3:20
2. "Not That Kind" (Kerri Chandler mix – radio edit) – 3:43
3. "Black Roses" – 3:38

European CD single

1. "Not That Kind" (album version) – 3:20
2. "Not That Kind" (Ric Wake's mix) – 4:50
3. "Not That Kind" (Maurice's Chicken Pox club mix) – 7:32

European maxi-CD single

1. "Not That Kind" (album version) – 3:20
2. "Not That Kind" (Ric Wake club final) – 7:59
3. "Not That Kind" (Kerri Chandler mix) – 3:34
4. "Not That Kind" (Maurice Joshua's Chickenpox mix) – 3:33
5. "Not That Kind" (LT's Not That Dub mix) – 7:13

Australian CD single

1. "Not That Kind" – 3:20
2. "Nothin' at All" – 4:29
3. "I'm Outta Love" (Matty's Soulflower mix) – 5:56
4. "Not That Kind" (Ric Wake club final) – 7:58
5. "Not That Kind" (Kerri Chandler vocal mix) – 6:52
6. "Not That Kind" (Kerri Chandler organ dub) – 6:52
7. "Not That Kind" (Maurice's Chicken Pox club mix) – 7:32

== Credits and personnel ==
Credits are adapted from the Not That Kind album booklet.

Studios

- Recorded at The Dream Factory (New York City) and Cove City Sound Studios (Glen Cove, New York)
- Mixed at Cove City Sound Studios (Glen Cove, New York)
- Mastered at Gateway Mastering (Portland, Maine, US)

Personnel

- Anastacia – writing, vocals, background vocals, background vocal arrangement
- Will Wheaton – writing
- Marvin Young – writing
- BeBe Winans – background vocals, background vocal arrangement
- Eric Kupper – guitars, keyboards
- Richie Jones – drums, arrangement, mixing
- Ric Wake – production, arrangement
- "Young" Dave Scheuer – recording
- Thomas R. Yezzi – recording (vocals)
- Dan Hetzel – mix engineering
- Jim Annunziato – assistant mix engineering
- Joe Ernst – assistant mix engineering
- Marc Russell – production coordination
- Bob Ludwig – mastering

== Charts ==
=== Weekly charts ===
Weekly chart performance for "Not That Kind"
Chart (2000–2001)	Peak position
Australia (ARIA)	21
Australian Dance (ARIA)	11
Austria (Ö3 Austria Top 40)	68
Belgium (Ultratop 50 Flanders)	37
Belgium (Ultratop 50 Wallonia)	12
Eurochart Hot 100 (Music & Media)	26
France (SNEP)	13
Germany (GfK)	56
Hungary (Rádiós Top 20)	1
Iceland (Íslenski Listinn Topp 40)	16
Ireland (IRMA)	14
Italy (FIMI)	9
Netherlands (Dutch Top 40)	26
Netherlands (Single Top 100)	31
New Zealand (Recorded Music NZ)	22
Scotland Singles (Official Charts)	8
Spain (Promusicae)	9
Sweden (Sverigetopplistan)	49
Switzerland (Schweizer Hitparade)	18
UK Singles (Official Charts)	11
US Dance Club Play (Billboard)	9
US Maxi-Singles Sales (Billboard)	15

=== Year-end charts ===
2000 year-end chart performance for "Not That Kind"
Chart (2000)	Position
Belgium (Ultratop 50 Wallonia)	97

2001 year-end chart performance for "Not That Kind"
Chart (2001)	Position
Europe (Eurochart Hot 100)	95
UK Singles (OCC)	157

== Certifications ==
Certifications for "Not That Kind"
Region	Certification	Certified units/sales
France (SNEP)	Gold	250,000^{*}
^{*} Sales figures based on certification alone.

== Release history ==
Release dates and formats for "Not That Kind"
Region	Date	Format(s)	Label(s)	Ref(s).
Australia	October 2, 2000	Maxi CD	Sony Music	
Germany	October 2, 2000	12-inch vinyl; CD; maxi CD	Sony Music	
France	October 24, 2000	Maxi CD	Sony Music	
United States	October 31, 2000	12-inch vinyl; maxi CD	Daylight; Epic	
France	November 21, 2000	CD	Sony Music	
United Kingdom	January 22, 2001	Cassette; CD	RCA	

== Usage in media ==
- In 2003, the song was featured on Fox's crime drama series Fastlane, in the episode "Strap On."
- "Not That Kind" has been performed by contestants in several singing competition television shows, including Australian Idol, New Zealand Idol and Idol.
