= Off the Hook =

Off the Hook may refer to:

== Music ==
- Off the Hook (compilation album), in the Now That's What I Call Music! series, 2002
- Off the Hook (Xscape album), 1995
- "Off the Hook" (Hardwell and Armin van Buuren song), 2015
- "Off the Hook" (Jody Watley song), 1998
- "Off the Hook", a song by CSS from Cansei de Ser Sexy, 2005
- "Off the Hook", a song by the Rolling Stones from The Rolling Stones No. 2, 1965

== Television ==
- Off the Hook (TV series), a 2009 British sitcom
- Off the Hook: Extreme Catches, a 2012 American reality series
- "Off the Hook" (Arrested Development), an episode
- "Off the Hook" (The Closer), an episode
- "Off the Hook" (Happy Tree Friends), an episode
- "Off the Hook" (The Real Housewives of Atlanta), an episode

== Other uses ==
- Off the Hook (radio program), an American hacker-oriented talk program
- Off the Hook, Pearl and Marina, a fictional pop duo in the Splatoon video game series
