= Now That's What I Call Music! 9 =

Now That's What I Call Music! 9 may refer to:

- Now That's What I Call Music 9 (UK series), original UK series, 1987 release
- Now That's What I Call Music! 9 (U.S. series), 2002 release
