= Jive =

Jive may refer to:

== Businesses ==
- Jive (publisher), a Japanese publishing company in Shinjuku, Tokyo Prefecture
- Jive Electro, a sublabel of the Zomba Group's Jive Records
- Jive Records, an American independent record label founded by Clive Calder in 1981
- Jive Software, an Aurea Software company
- Jive, a music venue in Adelaide, South Australia

== Dances ==
- Hand jive, a dance particularly associated with music of the 1950s
- Jive (dance), a dance style that originated in the United States from African Americans in the early 1930s
- Modern Jive, a dance style derived from swing, Lindy Hop, rock and roll, salsa and others
- Skip jive, a British dance, descended from the jazz dances of the 1930s and 1940s jive

== Other uses ==
- Jive talk, an African-American Vernacular English slang or vocabulary that developed in Harlem
- Jive (software), a commercial Java EE-based Enterprise 2.0 collaboration and knowledge management tool
- JIVE, an alias for American singer-songwriter Jive Jones
- Joint Institute for VLBI ERIC, a research institute to support the operations and users of the European VLBI Network
- Jive Jones (born 1981), American singer, songwriter, producer, model, and actor
