= Big Fat Liar =

2002 film by Shawn Levy

- Theatrical release poster
- Directed by: Shawn Levy
- Screenplay by: Dan Schneider
- Story by: Dan Schneider; Brian Robbins
- Produced by: Brian Robbins; Mike Tollin
- Starring: Frankie Muniz; Paul Giamatti; Amanda Bynes; Amanda Detmer; Donald Faison; Lee Majors
- Cinematography: Jonathan Brown
- Edited by: Stuart Pappé; Kimberly Ray
- Music by: Christophe Beck
- Production company: Tollin/Robbins Productions
- Distributed by: Universal Pictures
- Release date: February 8, 2002
- Running time: 88 minutes
- Country: United States
- Language: English
- Budget: $15 million
- Box office: $53 million

Big Fat Liar is a 2002 American teen comedy film directed by Shawn Levy from a screenplay by Dan Schneider and a story by Schneider and Brian Robbins. It stars Frankie Muniz, Paul Giamatti and Amanda Bynes, with a supporting cast featuring Amanda Detmer, Donald Faison, Lee Majors and Russell Hornsby.

The plot, alluding to Aesop's Fable The Boy Who Cried Wolf, follows a 14-year-old boy (Muniz) whose creative writing assignment "Big Fat Liar" is stolen by an arrogant Hollywood producer (Giamatti) who plans to use it to make the fictional film of the same name. It was released in the United States on February 8, 2002 by Universal Pictures to mixed to negative reviews from critics while grossing $53 million worldwide against a $15 million budget. It was followed by a direct-to-video sequel, titled Bigger Fatter Liar, in 2017.

== Plot ==
Jason Shepherd is a 14-year-old compulsive liar living in the town of Greenbury, Michigan, who tries to lie his way out of failing to write a creative writing assignment. He gets caught by his English teacher, Ms. Caldwell, and is given three hours to submit his essay and avoid repeating English in summer school. Remembering a comment from his father about making up stories being his “God-given talent”, he writes a story titled “Big Fat Liar”, drawing inspiration from his lying.

While riding his sister's old bike to turn in the essay (after a bully stole his skateboard earlier), Jason is accidentally struck by a limousine driven by Marty Wolf, an arrogant and unscrupulous Hollywood producer whom Jason blackmails into giving him a ride. Marty, a pathological liar, is in town shooting his next film, Whitaker and Fowl. In a rush, Jason accidentally leaves his essay in the limo when it falls out of his backpack. Inspired, Marty keeps the story for himself. After discovering his essay is missing, Jason is sent to summer school for failing to convince his parents and Ms. Caldwell that it was left in Marty's limo.

During the summer, Jason and his friend Kaylee go to the movies together, where a teaser trailer for Big Fat Liar is shown. After failing to convince Jason's parents of the truth, they fly to L.A. while their parents are out of town for the weekend and sneak into Marty's studio office. Jason demands that Marty confess to his parents, but he refuses, purposefully burns his essay, and calls security to remove him. Angered, the teens plot to inconvenience Marty until he confesses, and Marty's former limo driver and struggling actor Frank Jackson agrees to help.

Jason and Kaylee sabotage Marty through pranks such as dyeing his skin blue via his swimming pool and his hair orange via his shampoo. They also superglue his headset to his ear, trick him into attending a child's birthday party, where the children mistake him for the hired clown and attack him, and tamper with his car's controls, causing it to malfunction. Additionally, Marty accidentally hits a monster truck driver when an elderly woman, whom he had insulted earlier, rear ends him. The Monster truck driver, thinking Marty purposely hit him, runs over and crushes Marty’s car. These pranks and the incident with the monster truck driver cause Marty to miss both of his appointments with Universal Pictures president Marcus Duncan. Seeing the commercial and critical failure of Whitaker and Fowl, Marcus threatens to shut down production on Big Fat Liar. Jason offers to help Marty in exchange for his confession to his parents. During a party at Marty's house following the premiere of Whitaker and Fowl, Wolf uses Jason's advice to deliver a successful presentation and secure Marcus's approval of the film. Marty reneges on his deal with Jason and calls security to have him and Kaylee removed again. Fed up with his abuse, Marty's assistant and aspiring producer Monty Kirkham offers to help them expose him, rallying Marty's other tormented employees, while Jason calls his parents to tell them the truth about the weekend.

The next morning, Marty heads to the studio to begin filming Big Fat Liar, but his employees delay him through many mishaps. As he finally arrives, he encounters Jason, who steals his stuffed monkey toy, Mr. Funnybones. Jason flees across the studio with Kaylee's help, luring Marty to a rooftop where he retrieves his toy and mocks Jason. Marty boasts of his actions, falsely believing that no one is listening (or ever will, refusing to tell the truth, believing it to be "overrated"), unaware that the entire conversation is being broadcast to Jason's parents, the media, and Marcus, who immediately fires him for dishonesty and plagiarism. Furious, Marty tries to attack Jason, but the latter leaps from the building and lands safely on a stunt cushion, where he reunites with his parents, now aware that he was telling the truth and that he did all this to prove it.

Universal produces Big Fat Liar with the talents of those whom Marty mistreated, including Monty as writer and producer, and Frank as the lead character, Kenny Trooper. Jason receives full credit for his story, and the film becomes a success, as his parents and Ms. Caldwell are proud of him. Marty now works as a birthday clown named "Wolfie the Clown". His first job is at a house where a boy named Darren lives. Unfortunately for him, Darren's father, the Masher, as retribution for Marty having previously damaged his truck, has Darren drop-kick Marty in the groin.

== Cast ==
- Frankie Muniz as Jason Shepherd, a 14-year-old compulsive liar and slacker. Despite doing poorly in school, Jason is actually intelligent.
- Paul Giamatti as Marty Wolf, an arrogant Hollywood producer and founder of the fictional Marty Wolf Pictures film studio, which is associated with Universal Pictures. Unlike Jason, Marty does not care how his lies affect other people.
- Amanda Bynes as Kaylee Garrett, Jason's best friend, whom he often talks into helping out with his lies and schemes.
- Amanda Detmer as Monty Kirkham, Marty's long suffering assistant.
- Donald Faison as Frank Jackson, Marty's former limo driver and a struggling actor who helps Jason and Kaylee in their mission to get him back after being unfairly fired by him the year before.
- Sandra Oh as Ms. Phyllis Caldwell, Jason and Kaylee's eighth-grade English teacher.
- Russell Hornsby as Marcus Duncan, a man who is promoted from vice-president to president of Universal Pictures where he becomes Marty's boss.
- Michael Bryan French as Harry Shepherd, Jason's father.
- Christine Tucci as Carol Shepherd, Jason's mother.
- Lee Majors as Vince, an aging, but nevertheless qualified stunt coordinator.
- Sean O'Bryan as Leo
- Amy Hill as Jocelyn Davis, the senior vice-president of publicity at Marty Wolf Pictures.
- John Cho as Dustin "Dusty" Wong, the director of the Big Fat Liar film.
- Matthew Frauman as Lester Golub, a computer and special effects expert.
- Don Yesso as Rocco Malone
- Rebecca Corry as Astrid Barker, the receptionist at Marty Wolf Pictures who cares a lot about dogs.
- Sparkle Stillman as Grandma Pearl, Kaylee's senile grandmother.
- Taran Killam as Bret Callaway, a dimwitted skateboard punk who consistently bullies Jason and is tutored by Kaylee.
- Alex Breckenridge as Janie Shepherd, Jason's older sister who prefers spending time at her boyfriend Rudy's than looking after him.
- Ned Brower as Rudy, Janie's boyfriend.
- Michelle Griffin as Shandra Duncan, Marcus' wife.
- Pat O'Brien as himself, he interviews Marty on television about Big Fat Liar and covering the premiere of Whitaker and Fowl.
- Brian Turk as The Masher, a wrestler and monster truck driver. He has a young son (who has an identical resemblance to him) who is credited as "Darren", and is nicknamed "Little Mash" by his father.

Kenan Thompson, Dustin Diamond, and the film's director Shawn Levy appear as guests at the after party of the premiere of Wolf's action comedy Whitaker and Fowl, which they criticize. Jaleel White also appears uncredited as himself portraying Officer Fowl in Whitaker and Fowl and is often annoyed when Wolf calls him "Urkel".

== Production ==
Screenwriter John Hamburg provided rewrites during production, but final writing credits were awarded to Dan Schneider (screenplay/story) and producer Brian Robbins (story only).

=== Filming ===
Big Fat Liar was filmed from March to June 2001. The film was filmed at Universal Studios Hollywood (with sets from the film The Scorpion King visible in some scenes) and its Flash Flood set, and Los Angeles International Airport, as well as in Glendale, Monrovia, Pasadena, and Whittier, California.

The exotic Intermec 6651 Handheld PC appears as the computer used by Lester Golub to help Jason by releasing a stream of water into Marty's path.

=== Soundtrack ===
The film's soundtrack was released by Mercury Records in 2002.

No.	Title	Writer(s)	Length
1.	"Come On, Come On"	Smash Mouth	2:33
2.	"Conant Gardens"	Slum Village	3:03
3.	"Me, Myself & I"	Jive Jones	3:25
4.	"I Wish"	Hairbrain	3:11
5.	"Eye of the Tiger"	Survivor	4:29
6.	"Hungry Like the Wolf"	Duran Duran	3:41
7.	"Blue (Da Ba Dee)"	Eiffel 65	3:40
8.	"Diablo"	Triple Seven
9.	"Disco Inferno"	The Trammps	10:54
10.	"Party Time"	The Grand Skeem	3:32
11.	"Backlash"	The Grand Skeem
12.	"Where Ya At"	The Grand Skeem
13.	"Mind Blow"	Zion I	4:38
14.	"Right Here Right Now"	Fatboy Slim	6:27
15.	"Move It Like This"	Baha Men	3:51

== Release ==
The film was released in cinemas on February 8, 2002, by Universal Pictures and was released on VHS and DVD in Full Screen format in Region 1 while in region 2 was released in Widescreen on September 24, 2002, by Universal Studios Home Entertainment. The DVD release contains an unlockable cheat code for Spyro 2: Season of Flame that turns Spyro the Dragon blue, as seen in one of Jason's pranks on Marty. It was released on Blu-ray in Widescreen format for the first time in Region 1 on March 4, 2014.

== Reception ==
=== Box office ===
The film grossed $48.4 million in the United States and Canada and $4.6 million in other countries for a worldwide total of $53 million, against a budget of $15 million.

The film grossed $11.6 million in its opening weekend, finishing in second at the box office behind Collateral Damage ($15.1 million).

=== Critical response ===
On Rotten Tomatoes, Big Fat Liar has an approval rating of 45% based on 93 reviews, with an average rating of 5/10. The site's critical consensus read, "Though there's nothing that offensive about Big Fat Liar, it is filled with Hollywood cliches and cartoonish slapstick, making it strictly for kids." Metacritic assigned the film a weighted average score 36 out of 100 based on 24 critics, indicating "generally unfavorable" reviews. Audiences polled by CinemaScore gave the film an average grade of "A−" on an A+ to F scale.

Some critics called the film energetic and witty, but others called it dull and formulaic. Ebert and Roeper gave it "Two Thumbs Up". In his review for the Chicago Sun-Times, Ebert gave it 3 out of 4, and called it "A surprisingly entertaining movie [...] ideal for younger kids, and not painful for their parents." Michael O'Sullivan of The Washington Post called the film "an innocent comedic revenge fantasy that somehow manages to be sweet and wickedly satisfying at the same time."

=== Accolades ===
Year	Award	Category	Nominee	Result	Ref.
2002	Teen Choice Awards	Choice Movie: Chemistry	Frankie Muniz and Amanda Bynes	Nominated	
2002	Young Artist Awards	Best Family Feature Film – Comedy	Big Fat Liar	Nominated	
2002	Young Artist Awards	Best Performance in a Feature Film – Leading Young Actress	Amanda Bynes	Nominated	
2003	Kids' Choice Awards	Favorite Movie Actress	Amanda Bynes	Won	

== Sequel ==
In August 2016, it was announced that a standalone sequel had begun principal photography. Bigger Fatter Liar starred Ricky Garcia as Kevin Shepherd, Jodelle Ferland as Becca, Fiona Vroom as Penny, Kevin O'Grady as Ivan, Karen Holness as Miss Walker, and Barry Bostwick as Larry Wolf. The plot, though unrelated to the first film, was similar in many ways to Big Fat Liar. Released directly to DVD in April 2017, the film was met with critical and commercial failure. It was later released on Blu-ray in July 2018.

=== Potential future ===
In March 2022, Shawn Levy revealed that he has always wanted to make a direct-sequel to Big Fat Liar, stating that the plot would include a Marty Wolf revenge story. Levy referenced the revitalized Real Steel franchise in the form of the upcoming television series, as hope for a future Big Fat Liar sequel to be made.

== See also ==
- List of films featuring fictional films
