= I'm Outta Love =

2000 single by Anastacia

Single by Anastacia

from the album Not That Kind
- B-side: "Baptize My Soul"
- Released: February 29, 2000
- Recorded: 1999
- Studio: Homesite 13 (Novato, California)
- Length: 4:02
- Label: Epic; Daylight
- Songwriters: Anastacia; Sam Watters; Louis Biancaniello
- Producers: Sam Watters; Louis Biancaniello

Anastacia singles chronology
"I'm Outta Love" (2000)	"Not That Kind" (2000)

Audio sample
- I'm Outta Love: file; help

Music video
- "I'm Outta Love" on YouTube

"I'm Outta Love" is a song by American singer Anastacia. Written by Anastacia, Sam Watters, and Louis Biancaniello and produced by the latter two for her debut album, Not That Kind (2000), "I'm Outta Love" was developed by Watters and Biancaniello after Epic Records executive David Massey commissioned a dance-oriented song for the singer's powerful vocal style, with the writers aiming for a funk-influenced, high-energy pop track inspired by "I Will Survive" (1978) and "It's Raining Men" (1982), which Anastacia later described as drawing on multiple past relationships.

Released as the lead single from Not That Kind on released on February 29, 2000, the song became a major hit in Europe and Australia, reaching number one in Wallonia, Australia, and New Zealand; it was the most successful song of 2000 in the latter two regions. It additionally reached the top five in several others, including France, Ireland, Italy, the Netherlands, and Switzerland, and achieved multi-platinum and gold certifications across numerous territories, including 2× Platinum in Australia and Italy. An accompanying music video for "I'm Outta Love", directed by Nigel Dick and choreographed by Robin Antin, was filmed on location at the Park Plaza Hotel in Los Angeles, California.

== Background and recording ==
Following a short-living dancing career on television shows such as MTV's Club MTV and work as a backup dancer in music videos, including rap group Salt-N-Pepa's clip for "Get Up Everybody (Get Up)", in 1993, Anastacia relocated from New York to Los Angeles in hopes of launching a singing career. Soon after, she signed a production deal with Cece Peniston manager O.G. Pearce, but failed to arrange a recording contract. In 1997, Anastacia met San Diego–based music executive Lisa Braudé, who signed her with Braudé Management and encouraged her to join MTV's The Cut, a talent series for unsigned acts, the following year. Her appearance on the show led to a meeting with Epic Records A&R executive David Massey who offered a recording contract with his own label Daylight, a custom label of Sony Music Entertainment's Epic company, in March 1999.

For the sound of her debut album Not That Kind, Anastacia envisioned "something in a funky, Sly and the Family Stone" style. While Massey felt that it would be hard to find a song that stood up to her massive voice, he consulted Sam Watters from Epic's R&B group Color Me Badd to work on "a great song for a big voice, kind of "I Will Survive" but with a little more substance." Within three or four days, Watters presented a demo of "I'm Outta Love" in its earliest form. After listening to the demo, Anastacia agreed to further work on it alongside Watters and co-producer Louis Biancaniello. In an interview discussing the development of the song, Anastacia revealed that they had adopted Massey's approach while writing it, aiming for a song "like "It's Raining Men" and "I Will Survive", one that makes you move and makes you happy." Answering a question on British music show Later... with Jools Holland regarding if this song was about anybody in particular, Anastacia later replied, "It's about a lot of people in particular, not just one but probably many in my life who I wanted to have a love thing with but it wasn't there."

== Composition ==
Written in the key of B♭ Dorian mode with a tempo of 119 beats per minute, "I'm Outta Love"'s instrumentation features a synth bass, guitar and keyboards. Its main chord sequence of B♭m–F–A♭–E♭ starts 19 seconds into the song, after an introduction of different rhythmic keyboard and synth sounds, which is omitted in the radio edit. This chord progression forms most of the song except the final line of the verses and chorus, in which it changes to B♭m–F–G♭–F. Throughout the song, Anastacia uses a gospel-like voice and uses various ad-libs in the second and third choruses. The song ends on a fade-out.

== Critical reception ==
"I'm Outta Love" has been lauded by contemporary music critics. William Ruhlmann of AllMusic called the song an "aggressive dancefloor item," and added: "The minute she opens her mouth she starts reminding you of other singers, especially Aretha Franklin." Michel Paoletta, editor for Billboard magazine, declared "I'm Outta Love" a "sonic joyride [...] which moves and grooves with a spirit all its own." Baillie Russell from The New Zealand Herald called the song a "rousing Donna Summer-meets-Tina Turner disco anthem. Less impressed, MTVAsia.com editor Tricia Boey wrote that this song "could very well have been sung by Jennifer Lopez or a whole Billboard chart-full of other divas."

== Chart performance ==
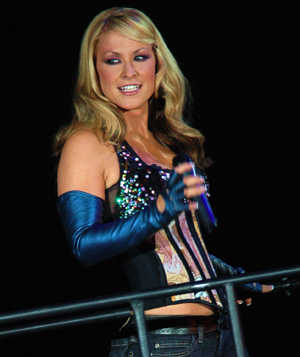
Performing live in 2005

"I'm Outta Love" was first released in the United States, where a promo-only 12-inch single was issued to club DJs in November 1999. Officially released to radio and retailers on February 29, 2000, the song debuted on the US Billboard Hot 100 on the week of April 1, 2000. It spent three weeks on the chart, peaking at number 92. As of 2016, the single remains Anastacia's only entry on the chart. "I'm Outta Love" fared better on several of the Billboard component charts, reaching number 11 on the Maxi-Singles Sales chart and number two for eight consecutive weeks on the Dance Club Play chart. "I'm Outta Love" also reached number 11 on the Canadian Singles Chart.

The single was released to greater international success in Australia and Europe, where Daylight Records and the Epic label had planned to develop a platform first and promotion through affiliates took off much quicker than in North America. In Australia, the track debuted at number six on the Australian Singles Chart, a month later reached number one and stayed there for five consecutive weeks. The song eventually became the highest-selling single of the year, and was certified double platinum by the Australian Recording Industry Association (ARIA) for selling over 140,000 copies. In New Zealand, the single spent seven consecutive weeks at the top of the charts, and after shipping over 15,000 units to retailers, the Recording Industry Association of New Zealand (RIANZ) certified it platinum. Like in Australia, the song ended up the highest-selling single of the year in New Zealand.

The track reached the top 10 in most European countries in which it charted. "I'm Outta Love" spent three consecutive weeks at number one in the Wallonia region of Belgium and was ranked eighth on national year-end chart. It also reached the top five in Austria, France, Hungary, Ireland, Italy, the Netherlands, Norway, Scotland, and Switzerland, and it entered the top 10 in Denmark, Germany, Spain, and the Flanders region of Belgium. In the United Kingdom, "I'm Outta Love" peaked at number six and was certified silver by the British Phonographic Industry (BPI) on October 1, 2000.

== Music video ==
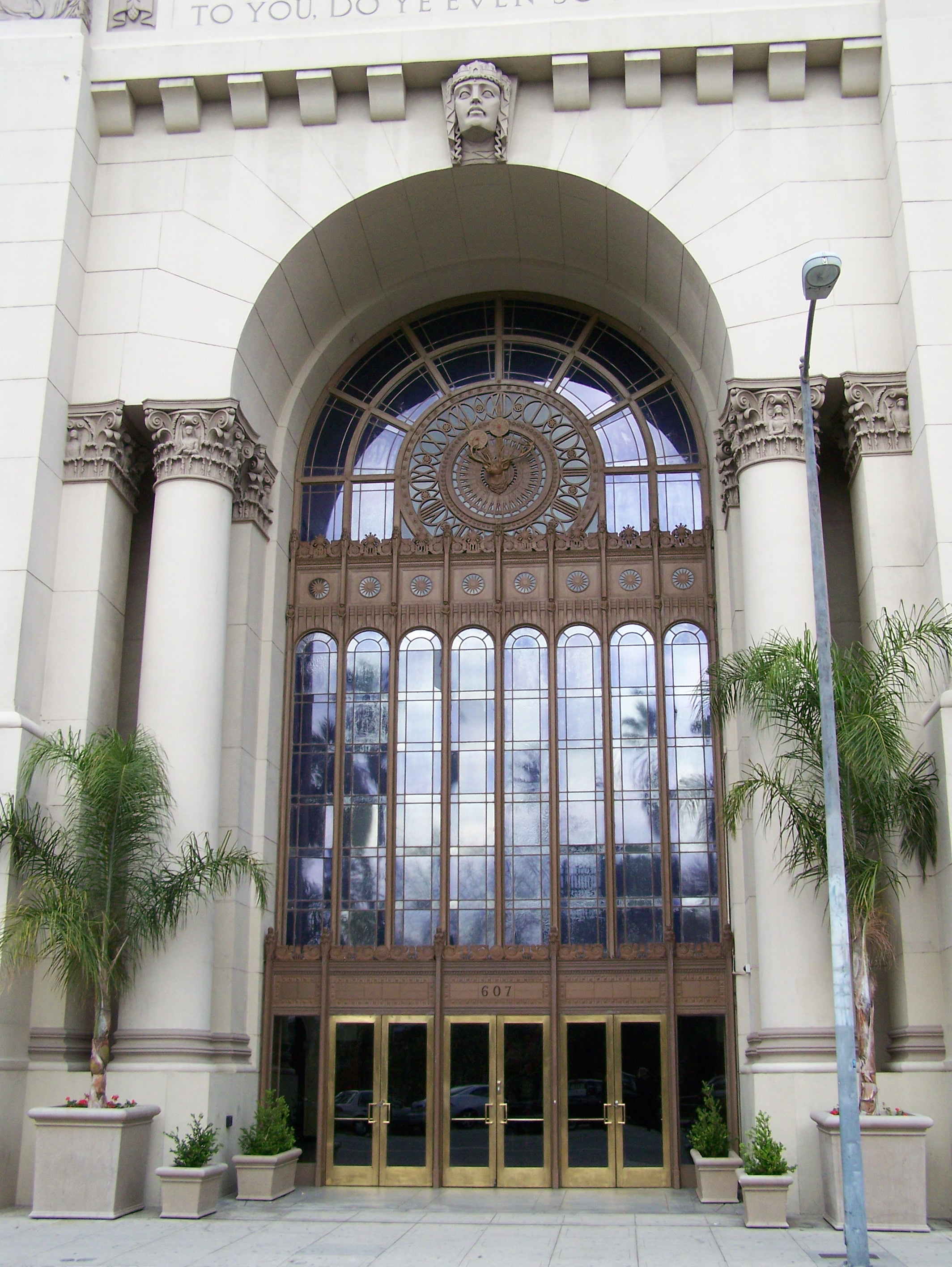
The music video for "I'm Outta Love" was filmed at the Art Deco-influenced Park Plaza Hotel in Los Angeles.

The music video for "I'm Outta Love", directed by Nigel Dick and choreographed by Robin Antin, was filmed on location at the Park Plaza Hotel in Los Angeles, California. Dick had previously shot the video for Guns N' Roses's "Welcome to the Jungle" (1987) at the same location. In 1999, "I'm Outta Love" earned Anastacia her first MTV Europe Music Award nomination in the Best New Act category at the 2000 awards ceremony. The song also spawned an official remix video for the Hex Hector Radio Mix, which included some new and extended scenes.

=== Synopsis ===
The video starts out with Anastacia walking through a tunnel with her coat on and cuts to a dressing room where she and her singers are preparing for a performance on stage. Intercut scenes of her female singers are shown in-between alongside Anastacia singing in the crowd. During the performance, a man who admires Anastacia neglects his girlfriend in favor of the performance. After the girlfriend confronts him and leaves, the man writes his phone number on a letter for Anastacia. After the performance, the man finds Anastacia backstage talking with her friends and gives her the letter with his number. She quickly reads it and walks away from the man, disgusted by his actions.

== Track listings ==
- US CD single
1. "I'm Outta Love" (album version) – 4:02
2. "I'm Outta Love" (Hex Hector radio mix) – 3:50
3. "Baptize My Soul" – 4:13
- US maxi-CD single
1. "I'm Outta Love" (radio edit) – 3:57
2. "I'm Outta Love" (Hex Hector radio edit) – 3:51
3. "I'm Outta Love" (Matty's Soulflower mix) – 5:56
4. "I'm Outta Love" (Hex Hector main club mix) – 7:59
5. "I'm Outta Love" (Ron Trent's club mix) – 8:35
6. "Baptize My Soul" – 4:13
- US 7-inch and cassette single

A. "I'm Outta Love" (album version) – 4:02
B. "Baptize My Soul" – 4:13

- UK CD single
1. "I'm Outta Love" (radio edit) – 3:57
2. "I'm Outta Love" (Rhythm Masters vocal mix) – 6:47
3. "I'm Outta Love" (Ron Trent's club mix) – 8:33
4. "I'm Outta Love" (multimedia video version)
- UK cassette single
1. "I'm Outta Love" (radio edit) – 3:57
2. "I'm Outta Love" (Rhythm Masters radio mix) – 3:53
- European CD1
1. "I'm Outta Love" (album version) – 4:02
2. "I'm Outta Love" (Matty's Too Deep mix) – 9:28
- European CD2
1. "I'm Outta Love" (album version) – 4:02
2. "I'm Outta Love" (Matty's Too Deep mix) – 9:28
3. "I'm Outta Love" (Hex Hector Main club mix) – 7:59
4. "I'm Outta Love" (Hex Hector radio mix) – 4:02
- Australian CD single
1. "I'm Outta Love" (radio edit) – 3:57
2. "I'm Outta Love" (Hex Hector radio edit) – 3:51
3. "I'm Outta Love" (Matty's 2 Deep mix) – 9:29
4. "I'm Outta Love" (Hex Hector main club mix) – 7:59
5. "I'm Outta Love" (Ron Trent's club mix) – 8:35
6. "Baptize My Soul" – 4:13

== Credits and personnel ==
Credits are adapted from the Not That Kind booklet.

Studios

- Recorded and mixed at Homesite 13 (Novato, California)
- Mastered at Gateway Mastering (Portland, Maine, US)

Personnel

- Anastacia – writing, background vocals
- Sam Watters – writing, background vocals, drums, production
- Louis Biancaniello – writing, keyboards, drums, programming, production, mixing
- Vernon Black – guitars
- David Frazer – mixing
- Bob Ludwig – mastering

== Charts ==
=== Weekly charts ===
2000–2001 weekly chart performance for "I'm Outta Love"
Chart (2000–2001)	Peak position
Australia (ARIA)	1
Austria (Ö3 Austria Top 40)	3
Belgium (Ultratop 50 Flanders)	10
Belgium (Ultratop 50 Wallonia)	1
Canada (Nielsen SoundScan)	11
Croatia (HRT)	3
Czech Republic (Rádio – Top 100)	4
Denmark (Tracklisten)	8
Estonia (Eesti Top 20)	19
Eurochart Hot 100 (Music & Media)	1
France (SNEP)	2
France Airplay (SNEP)	2
Germany (GfK)	6
Hungary (MAHASZ)	2
Iceland (Íslenski Listinn Topp 40)	11
Ireland (IRMA)	2
Italy (FIMI)	2
Netherlands (Dutch Top 40)	3
Netherlands (Single Top 100)	3
Netherlands Airplay (Music & Media)	1
New Zealand (Recorded Music NZ)	1
Norway (VG-lista)	4
Poland Airplay (Music & Media)	3
Portugal (AFP)	5
Scottish Singles Sales (Official Charts)	3
Spain (Promusicae)	8
Sweden (Sverigetopplistan)	15
Switzerland (Schweizer Hitparade)	2
UK Singles (Official Charts)	6
US Billboard Hot 100	92
US Dance Club Play (Billboard)	2
US Maxi-Singles Sales (Billboard)	11

2026 weekly chart performance for "I'm Outta Love"
Chart (2026)	Peak position
Poland (Polish Airplay Top 100)	80

=== Year-end charts ===
Year-end chart performance for "I'm Outta Love"
Chart (2000)	Position
Australia (ARIA)	1
Austria (Ö3 Austria Top 40)	28
Belgium (Ultratop 50 Flanders)	40
Belgium (Ultratop 50 Wallonia)	8
Eurochart Hot 100 (Music & Media)	4
France (SNEP)	6
Germany (Media Control)	37
Iceland (Íslenski Listinn Topp 40)	98
Ireland (IRMA)	22
Netherlands (Dutch Top 40)	2
Netherlands (Single Top 100)	13
New Zealand (RIANZ)	1
Sweden (Hitlistan)	91
Switzerland (Schweizer Hitparade)	4
UK Singles (OCC)	54
US Dance Club Play (Billboard)	4
US Maxi-Singles Sales (Billboard)	50

=== Decade-end charts ===
Decade-end chart performance for "I'm Outta Love"
Chart (2000–2009)	Position
Australia (ARIA)	33
Netherlands (Single Top 100)	71

== Certifications ==
Certifications and sales for "I'm Outta Love"
Region	Certification	Certified units/sales
Australia (ARIA)	2× Platinum	140,000^{^}
Austria (IFPI Austria)	Gold	25,000^{*}
Belgium (BRMA)	Platinum	50,000^{*}
France (SNEP)	Platinum	500,000^{*}
Germany (BVMI)	Gold	250,000^{^}
Italy (FIMI)	2× Platinum	100,000
Netherlands (NVPI)	Gold	40,000^{^}
New Zealand (RMNZ) Physical sales	Platinum	10,000^{*}
New Zealand (RMNZ) Digital sales + streaming	Platinum	30,000^{‡}
Sweden (GLF)	Gold	15,000^{^}
Switzerland (IFPI Switzerland)	Gold	25,000^{^}
United Kingdom (BPI)	Platinum	600,000^{‡}
^{*} Sales figures based on certification alone.^{^} Shipments figures based on certification alone.^{‡} Sales+streaming figures based on certification alone.

== Release history ==
Release dates and formats for "I'm Outta Love"
Region	Date	Format(s)	Label(s)	Ref.
United States	February 29, 2000	Contemporary hit radio; rhythmic contemporary radio	Daylight; Epic	
France	April 25, 2000	Maxi CD	Daylight; Epic	
Germany	May 5, 2000	Maxi CD	Daylight; Epic	
New Zealand	May 8, 2000	CD; cassette	Daylight; Epic	
France	June 6, 2000	CD	Daylight; Epic	
United Kingdom	September 18, 2000	CD; cassette	Daylight; Epic	

== Usage in media ==
- In 2001, the song was featured on Fox's legal drama television series Ally McBeal, in the episode "The Getaway."
- Country singer Chuck Wicks and Julianne Hough performed a Cha-cha-cha dance to "I'm Outta Love" on the eighth season of ABC's Dancing with the Stars in 2009.
- "I'm Outta Love" was featured in the dance rhythm video game Just Dance 2022.
