= Bigger Fatter Liar =

2017 teen comedy film

- Official poster
- Directed by: Ron Oliver
- Written by: David H. Steinberg; Ron Oliver
- Produced by: Justin Bursch; Mike Elliott; Greg Holstein
- Starring: Ricky Garcia; Jodelle Ferland; Fiona Vroom; Kevin O'Grady; Karen Holness; Barry Bostwick
- Edited by: Tony Dean Smith
- Music by: Peter Allen
- Production companies: Universal 1440 Entertainment; Capital Arts Entertainment
- Distributed by: Universal Pictures Home Entertainment
- Release date: April 18, 2017
- Running time: 94 minutes
- Countries: United States; Canada
- Language: English
- Budget: $3–7 million

Bigger Fatter Liar (also known as Big Fat Liar 2) is a 2017 teen comedy film directed by Ron Oliver and written by Oliver and David H. Steinberg. A standalone sequel to Big Fat Liar (2002), the film stars Ricky Garcia, Jodelle Ferland, Fiona Vroom, Kevin O'Grady, Karen Holness and Barry Bostwick, and follows Kevin Shepard (Garcia), whose idea for a video game is stolen by video game executive Larry Wolf (Bostwick).

Bigger Fatter Liar was released direct-to-video by Universal Pictures Home Entertainment on April 18, 2017. For his performance, Garcia was nominated for Choice Movie Actor – Comedy at the 2017 Teen Choice Awards, marking the first time a performance in a direct-to-video film was nominated in any category.

== Premise ==
Kevin Shepard is a tech-savvy high school student who frequently slacks off in school and lies to stay out of trouble. When a supposed tech savvy executive Larry Wolf gets a hold of his ideas for a video game, Kevin and his best friend Becca travel all the way out to San Francisco to confront Wolf about his wrong doings and mess with him through a series of pranks out of retribution which then eventually gets him fired from his job.

== Cast ==
- Barry Bostwick as Larry Wolf, a video game executive
- Ricky Garcia as Kevin Shepard, a tech-savvy high school student
- Jodelle Ferland as Becca, Kevin's friend
- Fiona Vroom as Penny, the assistant of Larry
- Kevin O'Grady as Ivan
- Nelson Wong as Kenny
- Reese Alexander as Jimmy
- Andrew Herr as Highcroft
- Omari Newton as Richie
- Paul McGillion as Tom, the father of Kevin
- Karen Holness as Miss Walker
- Lisa MacFadden as Marcy
- Jonathan Holmes as Becca's Father
- Morgan Brayton as Becca's Mother
- Adil Zaidi as Elliot
- Shayne Elliott as Ornery Guy
- Curtis Lum as Police Officer
- Jarelle Hepburn as Impound Lot Guy
- Ryan Beil as Mr. Hogg
- April Telek as Judy
- Mike Hanus as Meathead
- Irene Reynolds as Lady In Crowd
- Farris Tyab as Yoga Instructor

== Production ==
Filming took place in British Columbia, Canada from August 15 to September 8, 2016. Bigger Fatter Liar had a production budget of $3–7 million.

== Release ==
Bigger Fatter Liar was released direct-to-video by Universal Pictures Home Entertainment on April 18, 2017.

== Reception ==
Renne Schonfeld of Common Sense Media gave the film a negative review, calling it an "inane, fantastical comic misfire," although she praised the performances of Garcia, Ferland, and Bostwick.

For his performance, Garcia was nominated for the Teen Choice Award for Choice Movie Actor – Comedy at the 2017 Teen Choice Awards, marking the first time an actor was nominated for the award for their performance in a direct-to-video film.

== Future ==
In March 2022, Shawn Levy, the director of Big Fat Liar, revealed his plan for a direct sequel to the original film, stating that the plot would include a Marty Wolf revenge story. The filmmaker referenced the revitalized Real Steel franchise in the form of the upcoming television series, as hope for a future Big Fat Liar sequel to be made.
