= I Bet You Will =

US television program

- Created by: Morgan Spurlock
- Written by: Tim Brennan; Joe DeVito
- Presented by: Morgan Spurlock
- Country of origin: United States
- Original language: English

Production
- Running time: 30 minutes

Original release
- Network: MTV
- Release: June 10 – August 30, 2002

I Bet You Will is an Internet webcast, and later a show on MTV, that paid people to do outrageous things for money. In 2008, reruns of the program began to air on Spike. It was created by Morgan Spurlock. The show was hosted by Spurlock, musician/TV host/model Willa Ford, musician Jive Jones, comedian Godfrey, and Hescher.

== Format ==
The host selected a participant from a seemingly random group gathered on a street, at the beach, or on a college campus. The Master of Ceremonies then presented the stunt and told the player how much money they would win if the dare was successfully completed.

If the contestant rejected the amount of money, the host usually raised the bet. As soon as a bet was agreed upon, the player attempted the stunt. If successful, the contestant won the money. If unsuccessful, they won nothing except for what was collected in a "pity jar" by audience members watching.

On several occasions, if a participant did not agree to a bet, the host would ask if someone else in the audience would do it for a "Stolen Bet", of the same amount of money offered to the original participant.

Several segments were shown per episode, the end of which usually showed the contestant saying "I Bet You Will..." followed by the name of the stunt or the thing the contestant had to do.

== Dares ==
Dares used on I Bet You Will included the following:

- Eating or drinking a concoction of gross items or rotten food a la Fear Factor (cod liver oil was a staple of the show)
- Enduring public humiliation for a fixed period of time, usually involving being covered in a disgusting substance and/or being stripped totally naked to nearly naked, such as having to wear a thong with udders, getting painted as a cow, and eating wheat grass
- Having unusual things done to one's hair or body. For example, getting a mullet or having one eyebrow shaved off
- Having a prized possession (such as a wallet, university degree or car) damaged, destroyed, or otherwise irreplaceably taken away - this was sometimes paired with a stunt which if lost meant that the player lost the possession and got nothing in return
- Having one's money shredded, placed in a bowl, and mixed with a gross food, which the contestant then had to eat for a bigger payoff
- Being blindfolded while receiving tattoos of someone else's choice anywhere on the body.
- Being waxed in public.
- Sitting nude in public and letting strangers pour anything they wanted on them.
- Letting strangers draw on a person's body with permanent markers.
- Asking for wedgies and getting paid a fixed amount per wedgie.
- Rolling dice, spinning a wheel, or grabbing a rubber duckie and doing the stunt on a fixed bet.
- Getting someone to stomp guacamole with their feet and having someone else lick it off.
- Getting someone to walk barefoot through city streets and having another person lick the dirt off their soles.

Occasionally, bonuses were offered if a player could complete or endure a second dare while performing the first one. Failure to complete such a dare sometimes caused the player to fail the first one and lose everything. The host occasionally offered to double the bet on the condition that the contestant ate two or three more things, performed a dare naked, or allowed his or her best friend to aid in the humiliation.

Now I Bet You Will is aired in Latin America on VH1.
