= Now That's What I Call Music! 8 (American series) =

Compilation album by various artists
- Released: November 20, 2001
- Length: 71:54
- Label: Virgin

Series chronology
Now That's What I Call Christmas! (2001)	Now That's What I Call Music! 8 (2001)	Now That's What I Call Music! 9 (2002)

Professional ratings
Review scores
Source	Rating
AllMusic	4/5 stars

Now That's What I Call Music! 8 was released on November 20, 2001. The album is the eighth edition of the Now! series in the U.S. It peaked at number two on the Billboard 200 and has been certified 3× Platinum by the RIAA. Three tracks selected for the album, "Bootylicious", "Stutter" and "U Got It Bad", had reached number one on the Billboard Hot 100.

Now! 8 is dedicated to Aaliyah, who had died in a plane crash on August 25, 2001, with a portion of the album's profits going to the Aaliyah Memorial Fund.

== Track listing ==
No.	Title	Artist	Length
1.	"Bootylicious"	Destiny's Child	3:27
2.	"Pop"	NSYNC	2:54
3.	"I'm Real"	Jennifer Lopez	3:15
4.	"Stutter" (Double Take Remix)	Joe featuring Mystikal	3:32
5.	"Someone to Call My Lover"	Janet Jackson	4:32
6.	"AM to PM"	Christina Milian	3:33
7.	"A Little Bit"	Jessica Simpson	3:44
8.	"Crush"	Mandy Moore	3:49
9.	"Rock the Boat"	Aaliyah	4:33
10.	"U Got It Bad"	Usher	4:07
11.	"More Than That"	Backstreet Boys	3:41
12.	"Clint Eastwood"	Gorillaz	3:42
13.	"Start the Commotion"	The Wiseguys featuring Greg Nice	2:32
14.	"Me, Myself & I"	JIVEjones	3:28
15.	"I'm a Believer"	Smash Mouth	3:04
16.	"Fat Lip"	Sum 41	2:58
17.	"The Rock Show"	Blink-182	2:49
18.	"Bad Day"	Fuel	3:13
19.	"Be Like That"	3 Doors Down	3:55
20.	"Walk On"	U2	4:56

* The song "I'm Real" by Jennifer Lopez is not the more popular "Murder Remix" version featuring Ja Rule.

== Charts ==
=== Weekly charts ===
Chart (2001)	Peak position
US Billboard 200	2

=== Year-end charts ===
Chart (2002)	Position
US Billboard 200	9
