= Me, Myself & I (Jive Jones song) =

2001 single by JIVEjones

Single by JIVEjones

from the album Me, Myself & I
- B-side: "Like This"
- Released: August 14, 2001
- Genre: Pop; novelty
- Length: 3:31
- Label: Jive
- Songwriter(s): JIVEjones; Dave Katz; Chris Lindsey
- Producer(s): JIVEjones; Dave Katz

Jive Jones singles chronology
"Me, Myself & I" (2001)	"I Belong" (2002)

"Me, Myself & I" is a song by American musician Jive Jones, released in August 2001 as the lead single from his debut studio album, Me, Myself & I (2001). A novelty pop song with early 1990s influences, it was written and produced by Jones, with assistance from Dave Katz and Chris Lindsey.

The song reached the top 40 of the US Radio & Records contemporary hit radio chart. Internationally, the song charted in the United Kingdom and became a top 20 hit in the Netherlands. An accompanying music video, directed by Nigel Dick, received play on MTV, and the song was included on Now That's What I Call Music! 8. Critics are retrospectively divided on the song's inclusion on the compilation, given its commercial performance in the United States.

== Background and composition ==
Jive Jones began writing music at age 12 and spent his teen years involved in Miami's club culture, where he made music industry connections. He began writing and producing songs for artists including Mandy Moore, Anastacia, and Biohazard, as well as co-founding an online radio station. In January 2001, a profile of Jones on MTV.com reported that he had finished recording his debut album, to be titled Me, Myself & I, and that it would be released by Columbia Records that spring. Three months later, in April 2001, Jones signed with Jive Records, which announced plans to release his debut album in September 2001.

"Me, Myself & I", Jones's debut single, is a novelty song with a length of three minutes and thirty-one seconds. Jones co-wrote and co-produced the song with David Katz, with additional writing by Chris Lindsey. Jones's website called the single "a head brew of pop, hip hop, funk, electronic and rock". The song incorporates sound effects that are reminiscent of early 1990s music. Critic Chuck Taylor deemed the effects "campy". The Terminalhead remix, released as a single in the United Kingdom, drew comparison to "Higher State of Consciousness" (1995) by Josh Wink.

== Reception ==
=== Critical ===
In the October 20, 2001 issue of Billboard, Taylor gave the album a "New & Noteworthy" designation, calling it "the kind of hit-or-miss novelty song that could storm the nation... or become a keepsake to show the grandkids". Taylor noted the track's catchiness, commenting that it throws "more hooks around than a fishing trawler" and concluding that the song "has all the ingredients for an autumn party anthem" if it could gain traction on the radio. Kirstie McAra, writing for Contactmusic.com, was critical of the Terminalhead 12" mix released in the United Kingdom, writing that the remixers were "breaking no boundaries" and calling the effects "uninteresting".

The track was included on the 2001 popular music compilation Now That's What I Call Music! 8. In retrospect, the song has been noted as an unlikely inclusion in the Now That's What I Call Music! series, given its low chart position in the United States. Writing for Vulture in 2014, music journalist Dave Holmes ranked it the least successful song from its respective Now, considering it representative of 2001 radio and commenting that "if we’d allowed Sugar Ray to continue recording, they would have arrived at something like this", further comparing Jones to a combination of Crazy Town's Shifty Shellshock and The Noid. Also in 2014, Bustle classified the song as the "Wait, What?" moment on Now 8, with a comment that "No seriously, you need to see this video. That year, Billboard called the song "intensely strange" and listed it as one of the "Top 50 Forgotten Gems From The Now! Series". In 2018, The Ringer ranked it the "least essential song" from Now 8.

=== Commercial ===
In the United States, the song was sent to contemporary hit radio on August 14, 2001. In the August 17, 2001, issue of industry trade publication Radio & Records, an industry panel ranked the song at number five on their list of "Earpicks", songs they regarded as having hit potential. That week, the song was the "Most Added" song of the week in the CHR/pop radio format. Some stations, such as WYOY (Jackson, Mississippi) and WZYP (Huntsville, Alabama), began playing the song before its official add date, and reported favorable feedback from listeners. Jive promoted the song mainly to CHR/pop stations, but also released it to alternative stations. It ultimately reached number 40 on the Radio & Records pop chart on September 21, 2001, receiving 1,095 plays on monitored pop stations that week.

Internationally, the single charted in the UK and the Netherlands. The song entered the UK Singles Chart dated March 23, 2002, at its peak of number 77, before falling to number 100 in its second and final week on the tally. In the Netherlands, the single reached peaks of number 12 and number 13, respectively, on the Dutch Single Top 100 and Dutch Top 40.

The label's main marketing tool for the song was its music video, filmed on June 30, 2001, in Sun Valley, California, by director Nigel Dick. It was placed in MTV's rotation beginning the week ending August 19, 2001, and reached number 35 on the MTV Video Monitor for the week ending September 30, 2001. The video was further added to the Box Block for the week of August 27.

== Track listings ==
US CD single

1. "Me, Myself & I" (album version) – 3:31
2. "Me, Myself & I" (The Alternamix) – 2:37
3. "Me, Myself & I" (Terminalhead mix) – 6:03
4. "Like This" – 2:31
5. Snippets ("Superteen", "Now You're on It", "She")

Australian and New Zealand CD single

1. "Me, Myself & I" (album version)
2. "Me, Myself & I" (The Alternamix)
3. "Me, Myself & I" (instrumental)
4. "Dear Dad" (album version)

UK CD single

1. "Me, Myself & I" (album version) – 3:31
2. "Me, Myself & I" (The Alternamix) – 2:37
3. "Me, Myself & I" (Terminalhead mix) – 6:03
4. Enhanced element – 3:31

== Credits and personnel ==
Credits are adapted from the album's liner notes.

Locations

- Recorded at Sluggo Sound, New York; Mission Studios, New York; Beat Street Studios, New York; and Flow Studios, New York
- Mixed at Battery Studios, New York

Musicians

- Rob Bailey – guitars
- Jack Daley – bass and virtual DJ
- FS – scratches
- Luke Janklow – guitars
- JIVEjones – vocals
- Steve Wolf – drums

Technical

- Alan Armitage – mixing and recording
- JIVEjones – mixing, programming, and recording
- Dave Katz – programming
- Steve Lunt – mixing
- Paul Oliveira – assistant engineering
- Steve Wolf – programming
- John Wyman – recording

== Charts ==
=== Weekly charts ===
Chart (2001–2002)	Peak position
Australia Hitseekers (ARIA)	7
Belgium (Ultratip Bubbling Under Flanders)	15
Netherlands (Dutch Top 40)	13
Netherlands (Single Top 100)	12
Scotland (OCC)	81
UK Singles (OCC)	77
UK Indie (OCC)	11
US CHR/Pop (Radio & Records)	40

=== Year-end charts ===
Chart (2002)	Position
Brazil (Crowley)	59
Netherlands (Single Top 100)	96

== Release history ==
Region	Date	Format(s)	Label(s)	Ref.
United States	August 14, 2001	Contemporary hit radio	Jive	
Australia	October 29, 2001	CD	Jive	
United Kingdom	March 11, 2002	CD; cassette	Jive	
