= Jive Jones =

American singer

- Also known as: JIVEjones; JIVE
- Born: Denny Ira Kleiman c. 1975–1976 (Note: An MTV.com profile of Jones published on January 12, 2001, reports that he is 25, indicating that he was born between January 13, 1975, and January 12, 1976.); Miami, Florida, U.S.
- Genres: Punk rock, pop punk, alternative rock
- Occupations: Singer; songwriter; musician; producer; TV host
- Instruments: Vocals, guitar
- Years active: 1998–present
- Label: Jive
- Website: https://www.facebook.com/JiveJones & https://www.facebook.com/JIVEjonesofficial

Denny Ira Kleiman (born c. 1975–1976), professionally known as Jive Jones (sometimes stylized as JIVEjones or JIVE), is an American singer, songwriter, and producer. Raised in Florida, he got involved in the Miami nightclub scene as a teenager and became a songwriter and producer. Among the hits he penned were Mandy Moore's "Candy" (1999) and Anastacia's "Cowboys & Kisses" (2001).

In 2001, Jones signed with Jive Records, with plans to release his debut album later that year. His debut single, "Me, Myself & I", received play on US pop radio stations and went into rotation on MTV. Internationally, it charted in the UK and became a top-20 hit in the Netherlands. His debut album, also titled Me, Myself & I, did not receive a US release, but was released internationally on October 5, 2001. Jones also co-hosted the MTV game show I Bet You Will.

== Career ==
=== 1990s–2000s: Songwriting and production ===
Born and raised in Florida, Jones began writing music when he was 12 years old. He spent his teen years in the Miami club scene, working at Liquid, a Miami nightclub, which allowed him to make music industry connections. He initially drew attention for his work in music production and songwriting, working on tracks for Rachid, Mandy Moore, Anastacia, and Innosense. Among the singles he produced were "Candy," a 1999 hit by Moore, and "Cowboys & Kisses", a 2001 hit by Anastacia. In 2004, Jones considered pursuing legal action against Moore, claiming that he had been denied songwriting royalties for "Candy". Jones also co-founded The Womb, an online radio station.

Concurrent with his solo recording, Jones continued to produce other artists' work as well, including Biohazard's sixth studio album, Uncivilization, released in September 2001. While recording his solo album, Jones also recorded with Innosense, P.M. Dawn, Kim Ferron, and Shooting Blanks.

=== 2001: Me, Myself & I ===
In the September 9, 2000, issue of Billboard magazine, Jive Records announced that the label would be releasing his debut solo album in the next year. They also indicated plans to release a CD sampler including a bonus track accessible via PlayJ technology. A January 2001 profile of Jones for MTV.com reported that he was signed with Columbia Records and had finished recording his debut album, to be titled Me, Myself and I, as well as lead single "Money Shot", which would be released in February. Jones officially signed with Jive in April 2001. His debut album was slated for release on September 25, 2001, then pushed to October 9. Jones described the album as "rap-rock, like Limp Bizkit, but with a Prince flair", and commented that he enjoyed mixing DJ tracks with punk guitars. The album never received an official release in the United States.

The lead single from the album, the title track, was a novelty song that incorporated elements of early 1990s music. It was sent to pop radio stations in August 2001, reaching number 40 on the Radio & Records pop chart the following month. The accompanying music video, directed by Nigel Dick, was shot on June 30, 2001, in Sun Valley, California. The song was featured on the soundtrack to the film Big Fat Liar and received play on MTV, being added to rotation the week ending August 19, 2001. The track was also included on Now That's What I Call Music! 8.

Internationally, it entered the UK Singles Chart in 2002, spending two weeks on the chart and peaking at number 77. In the Netherlands, it became a top-20 hit on both the Dutch Top 40 and Dutch Single Top 100. Jones's next single, "I Belong", became another top-40 hit in the Netherlands. He appeared on the cover of the October 12, 2002, issue of Hitkrant, a Dutch music magazine, which that month also hosted a contest to win a meet-and-greet or DVD single of "I Belong". Following his solo releases, Jones became a co-host of the MTV game show I Bet You Will, in which contestants perform stunts for cash prizes.

== Discography ==
=== Album ===
Year	Album details
2001	Me, Myself & I: Released: October 9, 2001; Label: Jive

=== Singles ===
Year	Single	Album	Peak positions			
Year	Single	Album	NL Top 40	NL Top 100	UK	US
2001	"Me, Myself & I"	Me, Myself & I	13	12	77	— (Note: "Me, Myself & I" did not chart on the US Billboard Hot 100. However, it peaked at number 40 on the Radio & Records CHR/Pop Top 50 chart, an airplay-based chart.)
2002	"I Belong"	Me, Myself & I	19	27	—	—

=== Songwriting credits ===
Song	Year	Artist	Album
"Shining Star"	1998	Rachid	Prototype
"Sweet Charity"	1998	Rachid	Prototype
"Candy"	1999	Mandy Moore	So Real
"Cowboys & Kisses"	2000	Anastacia	Not That Kind
"Wishing Well"	2000	Anastacia	Not That Kind
