= Park Plaza Hotel (Los Angeles) =

Los Angeles Historic-Cultural Monument

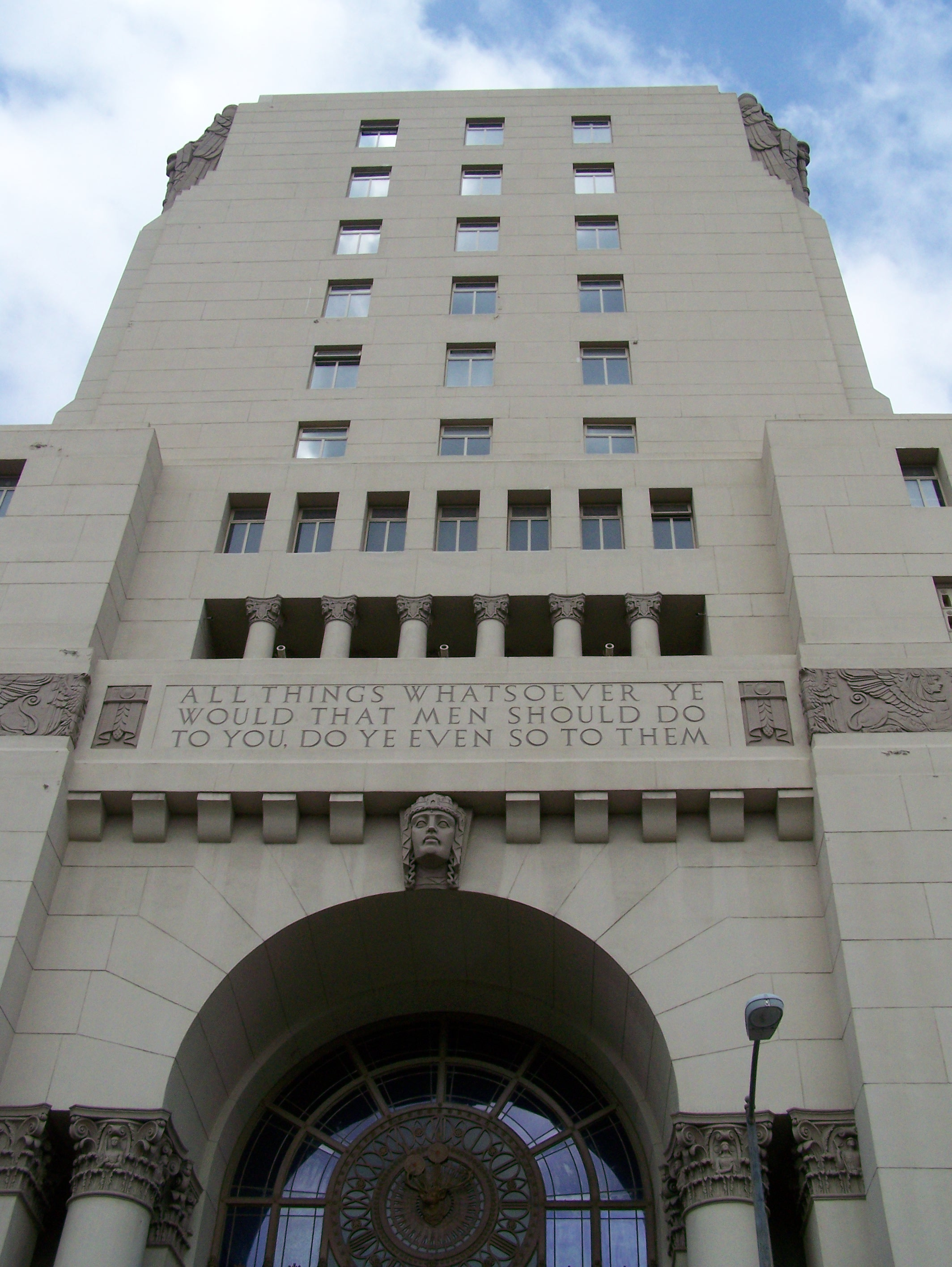
- Park Plaza Hotel Building
- Interactive map of Park Plaza Hotel
- 34°03′39″N 118°16′45″W
- Location: 2400-2416 W. 6th St. 603-607 Park View St.

History
- Built: 1923-24

Site notes
- Architect: Curlett & Beelman
- Architectural style: Art Deco

Los Angeles Historic-Cultural Monument
- Designated: 1983
- Reference no.: 267

The Elks Lodge No. 99 / Park Plaza Hotel, now The MacArthur, is located at 607 Park View Street across from MacArthur Park in the Westlake district of Los Angeles, California. Completed in 1926, it was designed by architect Claud Beelman, later to become renowned an Art Deco designer, when he was practicing as Curlett + Beelman.

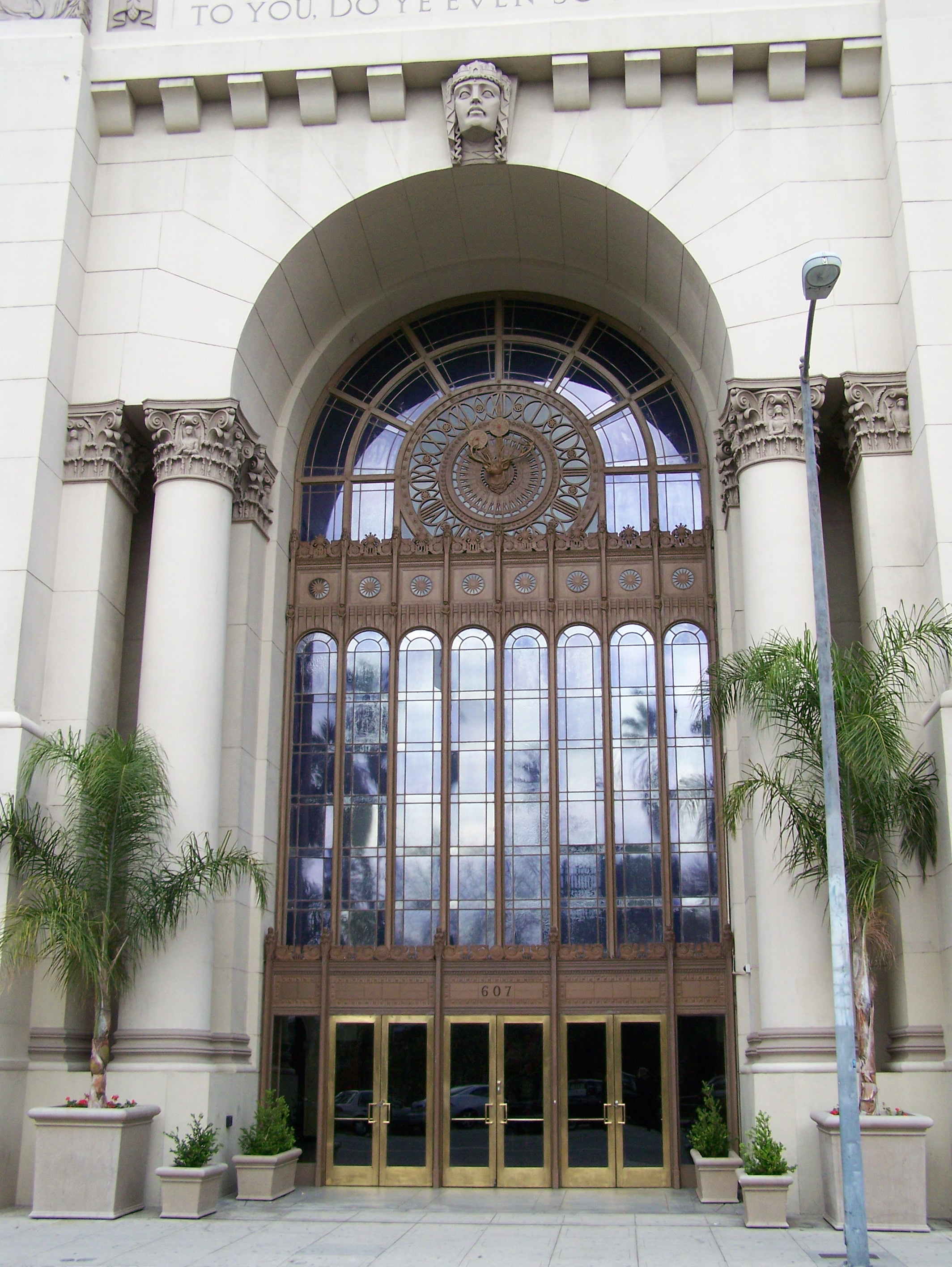
Entrance detail

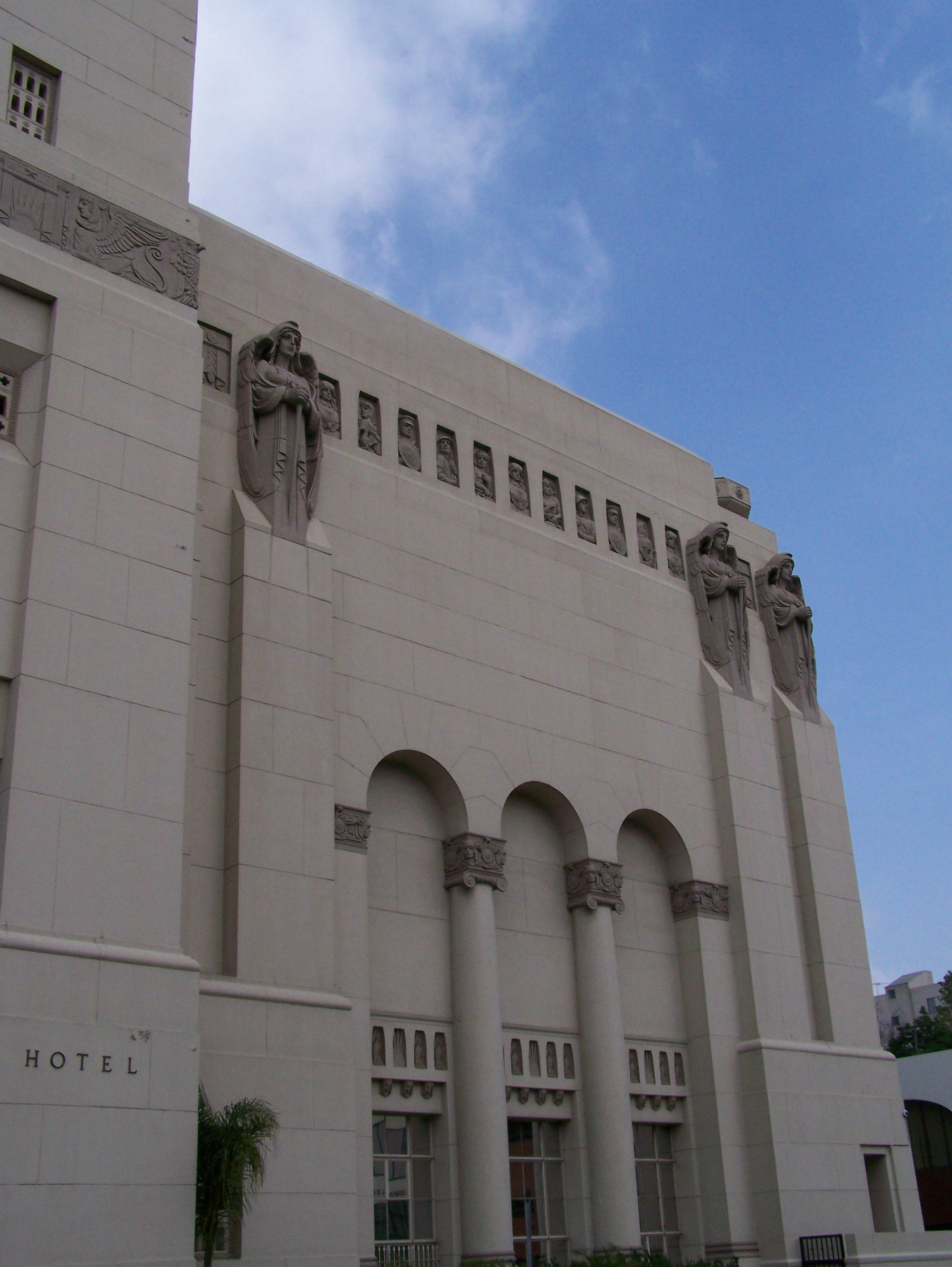
Detail of the northeast corner

== History ==
The building was originally designed for the use of the Benevolent and Protective Order of Elks (B.P.O.E). The building still has a brass sculpture of a set of elk antlers embedded in the clock above the grand entry to the building.

At the time, the Elks membership numbered thousands and included L.A.'s wealthy and powerful. The building contained 169 hotel rooms but was mainly designed for the Elk's activities and events, with lavish interiors, including an impressive spacious foyer, a huge ballroom that could be used as an auditorium, numerous dining rooms, a gymnasium, pool, and a bowling alley.

The architectural expression was eclectic, combining classical columns and arches, stylised Art Deco details, a symmetrical Beaux Arts form with a stepped skyscraper silhouette.

Designed as a memorial to World War I soldiers, the exterior features stylized Assyrian friezes, sculpted figures in military uniform, and massive cast stone warrior angels guarding the plinth and tower at every corner. The lavish interior features an arched ceiling painted by famed muralist Anthony Heinsbergen, who purposely undercut the competition bidding for the job and toiled on his back while painting, like Michelangelo. Heinsbergen later claimed that he rarely bothered with self-promotion again.

By the 1960s, following decades of declining membership and substantial losses at its Los Angeles lodge, the Elks could no longer maintain the building. It fell into general disrepair, and the Elks put it up for auction in 1966. The winning bid was entered by Eugene (Gene) Baur, president of Baur Properties, Inc., a small California family company, which owned and managed the property from 1966 through 1998.

With limited capital, Baur oversaw gradual repairs and restoration using in-house maintenance staff. Of particular note is the restoration of the elaborate hand-painted ceilings that adorn the building's lobby and ballrooms, which had undergone substantial water damage, staining, and peeling under the Elks ownership. Situated in one of the city's most troubled and impoverished districts, and equipped with mostly small, single-occupancy studio units (designed for Elks Lodge members travelling alone), the property was ill-equipped to succeed as the luxury hotel befitting its exterior, lobby, and grand ballrooms. Baur marketed the individual units as low-cost housing for senior citizens and students attending nearby schools, including the University of Southern California, Otis College of Art and Design, and the Fashion Institute of Design and Merchandising. Meanwhile, the building's ballrooms were rented out for low-budget wedding receptions and other events.

In 1983, Baur renamed the Elks Building the Park Plaza Hotel. Seeking additional revenue streams, Baur reached out to film industry location scouts, and by the end of the 1980s, the Park Plaza Hotel had become one of the most filmed locations in Los Angeles. It is featured prominently in Wild at Heart, Less than Zero, The Bodyguard, Barton Fink, The Mask, The Naked Gun, Johns, and The Fisher King, among others. Baur also cultivated partnerships with club and concert promoters, and the Park Plaza gained a second lease on life as one of Los Angeles's hottest night spots, hosting a series of series of successful nightclubs, such as Power Tools, Club Soda, Scream, and Truth, and other high-profile events, including the record release part for Madonna's Like a Prayer album.

Musical artists who have performed live or shot videos at the Park Plaza Hotel include Iggy Pop, Jane's Addiction, Guns N' Roses, Pat Benatar, Fishbone, Pearl Jam, Ministry, the Traveling Wilburys, Nick Cave, The Fuzztones, Maroon 5, Alice in Chains, and Steve Perry. One of the first rock shows Baur booked at the venue has entered punk rock lore as the Elks Lodge Riot (also known as the Elks Lodge Massacre), an event credited with galvanizing the nascent Los Angeles punk rock scene. Bands on the bill that night (March 17, 1979) included X, the Go-Go's, the Plugz, and the Zeros; however, only the Go-Go's could perform before Los Angeles Chief of Police Daryl Gates, misunderstanding the emerging punk movement as a dire threat to civil society, had his forces raid the building, shut down the event, and violently expel attendees with no apparent provocation.

Upon his retirement in 1998, Baur sold the building, after which a series of ownership groups failed to make the property profitable. In 2016 it was announced that the hotel will be restored by DCGG Park Plaza, the development group responsible for restoring the Roosevelt Hotel on Hollywood Boulevard.

== Setting ==
Despite the surrounding neighborhood's period of urban decay and renewal, the building endured as a classic example of Beelman's architecture still standing in the modern world. For a time, the building remained vacant, seeing use mainly as rental locations for film, television, and music video shoots and special events. In 1983, the City of Los Angeles designated the building as City of Los Angeles Cultural Affairs Department Historic-Cultural Monument No. 267. This is significant in that many other Wilshire Boulevard area landmarks fell prey to the wrecking ball during that time period, such as the notable Brown Derby. Luckily, despite the demolition of important landmarks all around it, the grand entrance and ballroom of the Elk's No. 99 / Park Plaza building still bears its old jazz age grandeur, much to the relief of Los Angeles architectural aficionados. The elaborate interior murals and decorative paintings were designed and executed by Anthony Heinsbergen and Co, noted painter of many Los Angeles cultural landmarks. The central design of the lobby ceiling is based on the Villa Madama, a Renaissance era project by Raphael and Giulio Romano.

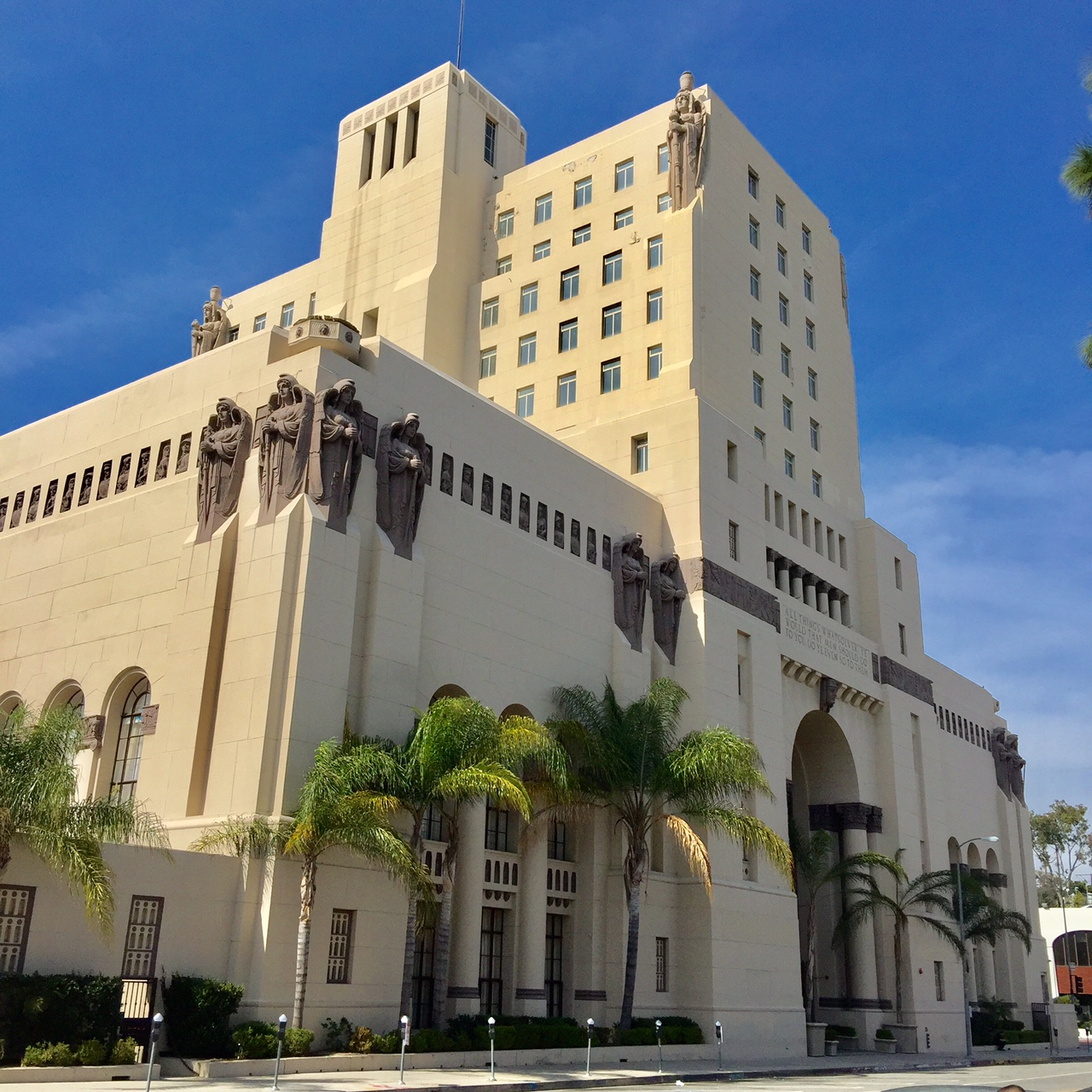
East façade of the Park Plaza Hotel, across from MacArthur Park

== Architect ==
Claud Beelman (1883–1963) was an American architect based in Los Angeles, California. He began his career as a draftsman in the Midwestern United States at the turn of the 20th century before moving to Los Angeles, where he designed numerous commercial and public buildings. While recognition of his work declined in the late 20th century, interest in his architectural legacy resurged alongside urban revitalization efforts in downtown Los Angeles and the Wilshire Center area.

== In popular culture ==
The music video for Kendrick Lamar's 2017 hit song "Humble" was filmed here in several shots; Steve Perry's 1984 hit song "Oh Sherrie" was filmed here, as was the music video for Pat Benatar's "Lipstick Lies" (1984), Peter Cetera and Amy Grant's duet "The Next Time I Fall", Anastacia's 2000 hit song "I'm Outta Love" and the music video for Maroon 5's 2015 hit song "Sugar." The video for Tupac's "Ghetto Gospel" also features a brief passing shot of the angel statues on the exterior of the hotel. The 2013 film Gangster Squad starring Emma Stone, Ryan Gosling, Sean Penn, Josh Brolin and Nick Nolte had the final shootout scene filmed here. The hotel was used for the prom scene in the films Not Another Teen Movie and Prom Night. The 1987 film Less than Zero had several scenes in the movie filmed at this hotel. Concert scene footage for the 1987 music video of Welcome to the Jungle by Guns ‘N Roses were also filmed here.

Other TV series and movies filmed here are:

- New York, New York (1977)
- Blood Feud (1979)
- One in a Million (1980)
- Stripes (1981)
- Young Doctors in Love (1982)
- Dempsey (1983)
- Dr. Detroit (1983)
- The Hidden (1987)
- Naked Gun (1988)
- Tango & Cash (1989)
- Wild at Heart (1990)
- The Hunt for Red October (1990)
- Hook (1991)
- Barton Fink (1991)
- Buffy the Vampire Slayer (1992)
- Chaplin (1992)
- Final Analysis (1992)
- Reservoir Dogs (1992)
- What's Love Got to Do with It? (1993)
- The Mask (1994)
- Naked Gun 33 1/3: The Final Insult (1994)
- Stargate (1994)
- City of Angels (1998)
- Inspector Gadget (1999)
- Rock Star (2001)
- The Kids (2004)
- Drive (2011)
- Lou Grant
- Falcon Crest
- Kojak
- Family Law
- CSI
- Ghost Whisperer
- Alias
- Party of Five
- Angel
- Gilmore Girls
- Beyond Belief: Fact or Fiction
- Master Chef
- Charlie's Angels (1979-1980)

101 ways to leave a game show

- The Orville
- New Girl (2011-18)
