= Off the Hook (compilation album) =

Now Presents: Off the Hook

Compilation album by Various artists
- Released: May 21, 2002
- Recorded: Various times
- Genre: R&B, hip hop
- Label: Sony

Now! US series chronology
Now That's What I Call Music! 9 (2002)	Now Presents: Off the Hook (2002)	Now That's What I Call Music! 10 (2002)

Professional ratings
Review scores
Source	Rating
AllMusic	4/5 stars

Now Presents: Off the Hook is a compilation album from the Now That's What I Call Music! series, released on May 21, 2002. Unlike previous Now! compilations, the album is composed exclusively of popular R&B and hip hop songs. It was certified Gold by the RIAA on June 25, 2002.

Off the Hook features the number-one Billboard Hot 100 hit, "I'm Real (Murder Remix)".

== Track listing ==
No.	Title	Artist	Length
1.	"Welcome to Atlanta"	Jermaine Dupri featuring Ludacris	3:16
2.	"Uh Huh"	B2K	3:43
3.	"I Got It 2"	Jagged Edge featuring Nas	3:21
4.	"Take Ya Home"	Lil Bow Wow	3:57
5.	"More Than a Woman"	Aaliyah	3:50
6.	"Bouncin' Back (Bumpin' Me Against the Wall)"	Mystikal	4:17
7.	"Let's Stay Home Tonight"	Joe	3:26
8.	"I'm Real (Murder Remix)"	Jennifer Lopez featuring Ja Rule	4:22
9.	"One Mic"	Nas	4:32
10.	"Don't You Forget It"	Glenn Lewis	4:12
11.	"Someone to Love You"	Ruff Endz	4:22
12.	"Nothing in This World"	Keke Wyatt featuring Avant	4:09
13.	"City High Anthem"	City High	3:51
14.	"Video"	India.Arie	4:04
15.	"Wish I Didn't Miss You"	Angie Stone	3:58
16.	"Son of a Gun" (Remix)	Janet featuring Missy Elliott	4:11
17.	"Lapdance"	N.E.R.D. featuring Lee Harvey and Vita	3:33
18.	"Lights, Camera, Action!"	Mr. Cheeks	4:20
19.	"Raise Up" (All Cities Remix)	Petey Pablo	3:58
20.	"Feels Good (Don't Worry Bout a Thing)"	Naughty by Nature featuring 3LW	4:13

== Charts ==
Chart (2002)	Peak position
The Billboard 200	13
Billboard Top R&B/Hip-Hop Albums	10
