= Now That's What I Call Music! 9 (American series) =

Compilation album by various artists
- Released: March 19, 2002
- Length: 78:43
- Label: UMG

Numbered series chronology
Now That's What I Call Music! 8 (2001)	Now That's What I Call Music! 9 (2002)	Now That's What I Call Music! 10 (2002)

Full series chronology
Now That's What I Call Music! 8 (2001)	Now That's What I Call Music! 9 (2002)	Off the Hook (2002)

Professional ratings
Review scores
Source	Rating
AllMusic	2.5/5 stars

Now That's What I Call Music! 9 was released on March 19, 2002. The album is the ninth edition of the (U.S.) Now! series. It debuted at number one on the Billboard 200 albums chart in April 2002. It is the fourth number-one album in the series and has been certified 2× Platinum by the RIAA.

The album was the first in the series to include radio remixes of some tracks, rather than the originals. It also features the song "Family Affair", the Billboard Hot 100 number-one single in this volume.

== Track listing ==
No.	Title	Artist	Length
1.	"Get the Party Started/Sweet Dreams"	Pink featuring Redman	4:02
2.	"I'm a Slave 4 U"	Britney Spears	3:23
3.	"Family Affair"	Mary J. Blige	3:59
4.	"Whenever, Wherever"	Shakira	3:15
5.	"Ain't It Funny"	Jennifer Lopez	4:00
6.	"Livin' It Up"	Ja Rule featuring Case	4:18
7.	"Rollout (My Business)"	Ludacris	4:00
8.	"Lights, Camera, Action!"	Mr. Cheeks	4:20
9.	"Raise Up" (All Cities Remix)	Petey Pablo	3:58
10.	"Caramel" (Trackmasters Remix)	City High featuring Eve	3:34
11.	"Turn Off the Light"	Nelly Furtado	4:35
12.	"Gone"	NSYNC	4:50
13.	"Emotion"	Destiny's Child	3:54
14.	"Differences"	Ginuwine	4:08
15.	"Drowning"	Backstreet Boys	4:26
16.	"Stuck in a Moment You Can't Get Out Of"	U2	3:41
17.	"Just Push Play"	Aerosmith	3:17
18.	"Dig In"	Lenny Kravitz	3:34
19.	"Wish You Were Here"	Incubus	3:32
20.	"Giving In"	Adema	3:55

=== Track variations ===
- The version of "Get the Party Started" is a remix by Rockwilder using elements of the Eurythmics song "Sweet Dreams (Are Made of This)" and featuring rapper Redman, instead of the much more popular original version which was a hit in the United States (and continues to be popular and air on mainstream radio stations to this day).
- The album version of "Ain't It Funny" is included, despite not being released as a single in the United States. The "Murder Remix" featuring Ja Rule is the version of the song released as a single (and subsequently reaching number one on the Billboard Hot 100) in the US.
- The version of the Trackmasters remix of "Caramel" removes the third verse and goes straight from Ortiz's second verse to Eve's rap.
- The album version of "Turn Off the Light" by Nelly Furtado is included over the popular remix featuring Ms. Jade and Timbaland.

== Charts ==
=== Weekly charts ===
Chart (2002)	Peak position
US Billboard 200	1

=== Year-end charts ===
Chart (2002)	Position
US Billboard 200	21
