= The Cut (1998 TV series) =

MTV reality television program

- Genre: Reality television
- Created by: Adam Tyler and Edna Sims
- Presented by: Lisa Lopes
- Country of origin: United States

Production
- Executive producers: Adam Tyler; Kathy Cotter
- Producer: Ifeanyi Njoku
- Running time: 22-26 approx. without commercials

Original release
- Network: MTV
- Release: September 28 – December 12, 1998

The Cut is a 1998 MTV talent series, hosted by TLC member Lisa "Left Eye" Lopes. It was the first in a line of televised song contests that later included American Idol. A handful of would-be pop stars, rappers, and rock bands competed against each other and were judged. The prizes were a record deal and MTV's funding to produce a music video, which would enter MTV's heavy rotation.

The season was won by a male-female rap duo named Silk-E, with rapper Lil' Noah taking second place. Anastacia, a then unknown singer-dancer, also made the finale, but did not win. Other notable contestants include R&B singer and songwriter Ne-Yo (then a member of R&B group Envy) and hip-hop duo Emanon, which featured a little-known Aloe Blacc.

== Premise ==
Episodes were around 30 minutes long (commercials included). There were four separate acts per episode, and vary from individual singers to groups. Artists performed in no particular order, and after the performances, a panel of alternating judges rated the performance from a scale of one to ten. Half-points, such as 7.5, were allowed. Whoever had the highest score at the end of the episode advanced to the finals.

=== Judges ===
Judges	Season 1 (1998)
Host	Lisa "Left Eye" Lopes
Judging Panelists	Thornell Jones
Judging Panelists	Dominica Johnson
Judging Panelists	Brian McKnight
Judging Panelists	Erica Grayson
Judging Panelists	Tom Sturges
Judging Panelists	Rome
Judging Panelists	Big Boy

== Episodes ==
(Names in bold indicate the winner of the episode)

=== Episode 1 ===
Original airdate: September 28, 1998

Act	Score
Morning Wood	22.5
Nik-Tash'Ta	23.0
Shyan Selah	24.5
**Gabi**	26.0

=== Episode 2 ===
Original airdate: September 29, 1998

Act	Score
Kid Funky	24.0
Blue Rap City	N/A
**Nyt Owl**	26.0
Amber	23.5
