= Daylight Records =

- Parent company: Sony Music Entertainment
- Founded: 1998
- Founder: David Massey
- Status: Defunct
- Distributor: Epic Records (In the U.S.)
- Genre: Various
- Country of origin: U.S.
- Official website: www.daylightrecords.com

Daylight Records was an American record label and subsidiary of Sony Music Entertainment, operated through Epic Records.

== History ==
Daylight was formed by David Massey in late 1998 as an Epic Records Group label, and has subsequently signed and helped to develop a broad array of artists, in the process achieving global sales in excess of 30 million records. Daylight also served as an A&R resource for all the labels within the Sony Music Label Group family, including Columbia Records Group, Epic Records and RED Distribution.

== Artists ==
- Anastacia
- Cheyenne Kimball
- Cyndi Lauper
- Delta Goodrem
- Good Charlotte
- Jonas Brothers
- Phantom Planet
- Save Ferris

== See also ==
- List of record labels
