= List of Top of the Pops dance troupes =

This is a list of Top of the Pops dance troupes.

== Chronology ==
=== January to October 1964 – no dance troupes ===
In the era before promotional videos were routinely produced for every charting single, the BBC would frequently have neither the band themselves nor alternative footage available for a song selected for the programme. In the first few months of the show in 1964, the director would just scan across the audience dancing in the absence of any other footage, but by October 1964 a decision was made to at least occasionally bring in a dance troupe with a choreographed routine to some of the tracks.

=== November 1964 to April 1968 – The Go-Jos ===
An initial candidate troupe was the existing BBC TV Beat Girls, but an ex-dancer from the Beat Girls, Jo Cook, was eventually engaged to create a troupe, the all-female Go-Jos, with Cook as choreographer. The Go-Jos also worked outside of Top of the Pops, notably for two years on the Val Doonican show – Doonican said in 1968 "I thought the Gojos were fabulous, something really new. When I got my own television series I just had to have them with me."

They were initially a three-piece (Pat Hughes for the first edition only, Linda Hotchkin and Jane Bartlett), but their number eventually grew to six (Hotchkin, Bartlett, Lesley Larbey, Wendy Hilhouse, Barbara van der Heyde and Thelma Bignell) with Cook as full-time choreographer. Lulu remembered of their costumes "They mostly wore white boots to the knee and short skirts and the camera would go up the skirt and it was all very risqué."

Cook herself said of working on the Doonican show (of which she was dance director) comparing to Top of the Pops, "Pop steps are limited...With Val we have more scope, and we can work to get more of the feel of ballet into our numbers."

=== May to June 1968 – Go-Jos/Pan's People transition ===
In April 1968, a Top of the Pops choreographer, Virginia Mason, auditioned for dancers for a routine on Top of The Pops ("Simon Says" by the 1910 Fruitgum Company); two of whom that were successful (Ruth Pearson and Patricia "Dee Dee" Wilde) were part of the existing six-female dance troupe, Pan's People. Like the Go-Jos, this group was also partly drawn from ex-members of the Beat Girls. Although this routine did not make it onto the programme itself, in subsequent weeks, members of Pan's People (Louise Clarke, Felicity "Flick" Colby, Barbara "Babs" Lord, Pearson, Andrea "Andi" Rutherford and Wilde) started to appear on the programme separately to the Go-Jos. Pan's People were then selected by the BBC over the Go-Jos when they chose a group to be the resident troupe. The Go-Jos' final Top of The Pops performance was in June 1968 dancing to "Jumping Jack Flash" by The Rolling Stones.

=== July 1968 to April 1976 – Pan's People ===
As with the Go-Jos, in the first eighteen months of the Pan's People era the dancers were not a weekly fixture on the programme. However, because of group fan mail and good viewing figures, by 1970 the group was on nearly every week. Pay was not high: they were paid the minimum equity rate of £56 per week. One of the original Pan's People dancers, Colby, became full-time choreographer in 1971. Colby spoke of the dancing – "They weren't Broadway-standard routines...we were definitely doing watercolours, not oil paintings."

=== May to October 1976 – Ruby Flipper ===
In early 1976, the last remaining of the early members of Pan's People, Ruth Pearson, announced her retirement, leaving just four members all of whom who had joined within the last four years: Cherry Gillespie, Mary Corpe, Lee Ward and Sue Menhenick. Rather than continue with this line-up or add additional members, Colby and BBC production staff decided to replace this group with a male and female group created for the programme, Ruby Flipper, choreographed by Colby and managed by Colby with Pearson. Lee Ward left shortly after this decision was made, reportedly saying regarding the change "It's a big mistake. Men rush home to watch sexy ladies. They do not want to see other men."

Rehearsals for this new group started in March 1976, and the group began appearing on Top of The Pops in May 1976. Whilst producers were aware of the switch to the new group, Bill Cotton, the then head of the light entertainment unit of which Top of The Pops was part, was not. This group started as a seven-piece with three men (Gavin Trace, Floyd Pearce and Phil Steggles) and four women (Menhenick, Gillespie, Patti Hammond and Lulu Cartwright). Corpe was not invited to join the new troupe. Trace, Pearce, Steggles and Cartwright joined following open auditions; Hammond, an established dancer, was invited to join to complete the "look" following a later individual audition. Colby viewed this gender-mixed group as an opportunity to develop more physical routines including lifts, more duets and generally not have the whole group at each performance.

However, by August the BBC had decided to terminate the group because of perceived unpopularity and being "... out of step with viewers". Their final appearance was in October 1976 (by this time Trace and Gillespie had already left, reducing Ruby Flipper to five members), with the senior management insisting on a replacement all-female grouping. Colby recalled of this time “Bill Cotton called me in and said the British public didn’t want to see black men dancing with white women...I argued, but he told me to form another all-girl group or I was out."

=== November 1976 to October 1981 – Legs & Co ===
The group created to replace Ruby Flipper was Legs & Co, reverting to an all-female line-up, and once more choreographed by Colby. Three of the six in the initial line-up (Menhenick, Cartwight and Hammond) were taken from Ruby Flipper. with Rosie Hetherington, Gill Clarke and Pauline Peters making up the six. Despite being an all-female group, on occasion one or more male dancers were brought in, notably Pearce several times.

During their run the group covered the transition from Disco to Punk, Electronic and Modern Romantic music. Notably, they danced to two Sex Pistols tracks, as the Sex Pistols never did a studio performance in this period.

=== December 1981 to September 1983 – Zoo ===
By late 1981, Legs & Co (by this time Anita Chellamah had replaced Peters) had become more integrated into the studio audience, rather than performing set-piece routines, as a result of the 'party atmosphere' brought in by Michael Hurll. Also by this time Colby was particularly keen to work once more with male dancers; feeling it time for a change, Legs & Co's stint was ended, and a twenty-member dance troupe (ten male, ten female), named Zoo was created, with a set of performers drawn from the pool of twenty each week. Colby was now credited as "Dance Director". Three members of previous troupes, Menhenick, Corpe and Chellamah, made at least one appearance each during the Zoo period. The dancers now chose their own clothes, moving away from the synchronised appearance of previous troupes.

=== October 1983 to 2006 – after Zoo ===
By the early 1980s, record companies were offering the BBC free promotional videos, meaning dance troupes no longer fulfilled their original purpose. Zoo's run ended in 1983, and with it the use of dance troupes on Top of The Pops.

After the demise of Zoo, the audience took a more active role, often dancing in more prominent areas such as behind performing acts on the back of the stage, and on podiums. However, in addition the show also employed so-called cheerleaders to lead the dancing.

=== Dance troupe chronology ===
Go-Jos' first performance: 19 November 1964 – Dancing to "Baby Love" by The Supremes

Pan's People first performance (three of the dancers, independently contracted): April 1968 – Dancing to "Young Girl" by Gary Puckett & The Union Gap or "Respect" by Aretha Franklin

Pan's People's first performance (as the six-piece group of early 1968): 30 May 1968 – Dancing to "U.S. Male" by Elvis Presley

Go-Jos' final performance: 27 June 1968 – Dancing to "Jumping Jack Flash" by The Rolling Stones

Pan's People's final performance: 29 April 1976 – Dancing to "Silver Star" by The Four Seasons

Ruby Flipper's first performance: 6 May 1976 – Dancing to "Can't Help Falling In Love" by The Stylistics

Ruby Flipper's final performance: 14 October 1976 – Dancing to "Play That Funky Music" by Wild Cherry

Legs & Co's first performance (credited as ??????): 21 October 1976 – Dancing to "Queen Of My Soul" by Average White Band

Legs & Co's first performance (credited as Legs & Co): 11 November 1976 – Dancing to "Spinning Rock Boogie" by Hank C. Burnette

Legs & Co's final performance: 29 October 1981 – Dancing to "Favourite Shirts (Boy Meets Girl)" by Haircut 100

Sue Menhenik of Legs & Co's final performance, credited as part of Zoo December 1981 – Dancing to "I'll Find My Way Home" by Jon and Vangelis; the last person associated with Pan's People.

Zoo's first performance: 5 November 1981 – Dancing to "Twilight" by E.L.O.

Zoo's final performance: 29 September 1983 – Dancing to "What I Got Is What You Need" by Unique

The full-height vertical lines indicate the last performance of each troupe.
