= Legs & Co. =

Dance troupe

Legs & Co. was a dance troupe created in 1976 for the BBC's weekly Top of the Pops programme. They had made over three hundred appearances on this show by the time of their last performance in 1981. The group then continued for four further years on tour. The six-girl dance troupe replaced Ruby Flipper on Top of the Pops, representing a reversion to the earlier all-female format for troupes on this show, and covering the time period when the disco, punk and new wave music fashions were at their chart peak.

== Top of the Pops dance troupe history ==
Legs & Co. were the fourth dance troupe to perform on the BBC's Top of The Pops. The tenure of the first group, the Go-Jos, ran from 1964 to 1968, with Pan's People then taking over until April 1976. This group was choreographed for their entire existence by Flick Colby, who was also initially a dancer in the troupe. Ruth Pearson performed as one of the dancers in this group throughout its run on the programme, retiring when the group was replaced.

Pan's People were succeeded by Ruby Flipper, a mixed-gender and mixed-race group, choreographed by Colby and managed by Pearson. This group's short run was terminated in October 1976. Audience research by the producers indicated Ruby Flipper were not popular amongst its TV audience. Colby formed a new group, again managed by herself and Pearson, retaining the remaining three female dancers from Ruby Flipper and adding three new dancers following auditions. This replacement was the group that came to be known as Legs & Co.

Due to improvements in the BBC archival process and the increase in off-air recordings from the mid-1970s, unlike the previous three groups, all performances at least partially survive with the vast bulk complete.

== Legs & Co. on Top of the Pops ==
=== Initial line-up and name ===
The three remaining female Ruby Flipper members were retained for the new group. These were:

- Lulu Cartwright, in her second troupe following her stint in Ruby Flipper
- Patti Hammond, who started her career in the Royal Ballet, before moving into modern and TV dancing, including appearing with the Second Generation
- Sue Menhenick, who was in her third Top of the Pops dance troupe, having also been a member of Pan's People and Ruby Flipper.

Following a set of auditions, the following dancers were added:

- Rosemary Hetherington, a student at the Italia Conti stage school
- Pauline Peters, who had appeared on stage in various West End productions and in the dance troupe Young Generation
- Gill Clark, the runner-up in the Miss Great Britain 1976 contest - added as the sixth and last member after the final audition.

By the time of the new troupe's first appearance on Top of the Pops on 21 October 1976, dancing to the Average White Band's "Queen of My Soul", the group was still unnamed. For their first appearances, they were introduced as the "Top of the Pops" dancers, while their name was listed as "??????" on the end credits of three editions. The BBC decided to allow viewers to select a name for the new dance troupe via a competition promoted on Top of the Pops by Ed Stewart before the girls made their dancing debut, and on the BBC children's programme Blue Peter. The name "Legs & Co." was chosen as the successful name. This was announced on the Top of the Pops of 4 November 1976, with the competition winner in attendance, Elaine Coombes.

=== Performances on the show ===
==== Style ====
As with all dance troupes on Top of the Pops, Legs & Co. performed routines to songs of various musical styles, reflecting what was in the charts at the time. While these performances would often include dance records, for example disco and soul music, less dance-orientated musical styles were also included including tracks from Punk bands such as the Sex Pistols and The Clash, novelty songs and in the final year, medley songs.

The costumes were made specially for each performance, with the designs created by Flick Colby and the dress designer each Thursday for the next show. Whilst in the vast bulk of performances contemporary costumes were used, humour was occasionally used resulting in unconventional costumes including dressing as boxers, babies and a camel.

==== Production schedule ====
There was a rigid production schedule for the group necessitated by Top of the Pops being a weekly chart show.

The typical schedule for a recorded Top of the Pops was as follows:

- Wednesday: The show was recorded at Television Centre including the Legs & Co. segment. A track was selected the same evening for the following week's show by the producer, occasionally giving Flick Colby a limited choice.
- Thursday: The performance for the new track had staging and costumes planned by Flick Colby with the staging and costume managers. The show based on the previous day's recording was broadcast.
- Monday: Usually, the first day of rehearsing at the BBC North Acton rehearsal studios, with choreography created through the rehearsals, and costume fitting in the afternoon. Occasionally, the rehearsing could begin the previous Friday.
- Tuesday: Charts released. Either second day of rehearsal of the planned track, or a new track was selected if the prechosen one was no longer required for the show, and the new track was choreographed, staged, costumed and rehearsed. A new track was a common occurrence, once with 5 editions in a row requiring new tracks.
- Wednesday: There was a non-costumed studio run through in the late morning with cameras (and band, if a band was involved). The full show dress rehearsal was done in the late afternoon in Television Centre. The performance itself was recorded with the studio audience in the evening. Normally it was done in two takes with close-ups in the second take. Due to the studio schedule, there was often no opportunity for further takes and so minor errors were often kept in the edited version.

The troupe could also rehearse for and perform up to three cabaret performances prior to the following Monday.

By 1981, Top of the Pops began going out live on occasion, with three live editions, 7 May 1981, 9 July 1981 and 3 September 1981 including three performances on each date by Legs & Co.

==== Archive status ====
The BBC only holds in their library master tapes for all Top of the Pops episodes broadcast after 8 September 1977, with only partial coverage up to this date. Nine editions in the Legs & Co era do not have master tapes in the BBC library, though all missing performances survive either in off-air recordings or master copies, though not all are complete. The following table shows for each year the number of performances on the show, the number of repeats of these performances, and the number of wiped performances, with totals on the bottom row.

Year	Performances	Repeat	bbc-wiped
1976	15	0	4
1977	66	8	5
1978	64	9	0
1979	58	7	0
1980	48	5	0
1981	71	8	0
Total	322	37	9

The episodes not in the BBC archive are:

Date	Performances	Availability
11 November 1976	Hank C Burnette – Spinning Rock Boogie	90 seconds only survives from a copy of a master tape, the official naming of the group was on this episode and is lost.
18 November 1976	Peter Frampton – Do You Feel Like We Do	69 seconds only survives from a copy of a master tape.
2 December 1976	Queen – Somebody to Love	Off-air exists
16 December 1976	The Stylistics – You'll Never Get To Heaven	Off-air exists
10 February 1977	Heatwave – Boogie Nights	Off-air exists
3 March 1977	David Bowie – Sound And Vision	Off-air exists
31 March 1977	David Soul – Going in with My Eyes Open	Off-air exists - played as part of BBC4 rerun
4 August 1977	Candi Staton – Nights on Broadway	Off-air exists
8 September 1977	Jean Michel Jarre – Oxygene	Off-air exists

=== Performances outside the show in this era ===
As well as their regular appearances on Top of the Pops, Legs & Co. as a full group appeared on other productions of the time including:

- BBC TV's Jim'll Fix It in 1978 as part of a viewer's 'Fix It'.
- The film The Stud in 1978, dancing to a performance by The Real Thing
- BBC TV's Blue Peter in 1979 – the troupe danced to Mike Oldfield's arrangement of the programme's theme tune.
- The 1979 British Rock and Pop Awards dancing to a medley of 1978 hits
- ATV's Tiswas, in 1980 as both guests and performers.
- BBC internal Christmas tapes, produced by production staff

They also did cabaret at the weekends as this fitted into their production schedule; however, they had to remain predominantly UK-based during their Top of the Pops era due to the need to be rehearsing for the show each Monday. Sue Menhenick recalled "As legs & co progressed more with cabaret, [our] shows became more of a 'show' rather than just 'a routine and then someone else would come on', which was the case with Pan's People sometimes, so we did more of a running show." By 1980, they had a 45-minute set.

=== Additional dancers ===
==== Change in line-up ====
The original Legs & Co. line-up ran from October 1976 to 19 March 1981, when Pauline Peters left the group. She was replaced on 28 May 1981 by singer and dancer Anita Chellamah following auditions. Frances Ruffelle was an unsuccessful applicant.

The first performance of this new line-up was to Ain't No Stopping by Enigma. The second line-up lasted until the end of the group's tenure on Top of the Pops.

==== Other dancers ====
Though the seven Legs & Co. dancers never had stand-ins, on several occasions other dancers appeared together with Legs & Co. on Top of the Pops, shown in the following table. The additional dancer(s) accompanied the full troupe in each case unless otherwise stated.

Date	Dancer	Track	Artist	Credited (Y/N)
23 December 1976	Floid Pearce	"I Wish"	Stevie Wonder	N
25 December 1976	6 unknown (in animal costumes)	"Jungle Rock"	Hank Mizell	N
14 April 1977	Floid Pearce	"Lonely Boy"	Andrew Gold	N
16 June 1977	Floid Pearce	"You're Gonna Get Next To Me"	Bo Kirkland and Ruth Davis	N
11 August 1977	Floid Pearce	"I Feel Love"	Donna Summer	N
25 December 1977	Floid Pearce	"Sir Duke"	Stevie Wonder	N
25 May 1978	Floid Pearce	"Let's Go Disco"	The Real Thing	N
25 May 1978	Floid Pearce	"You're the One That I Want"	John Travolta and Olivia Newton-John	N
21 September 1978	Floid Pearce	"You Make Me Feel (Mighty Real)"	Sylvester	N
19 October 1978	Martin (with Patti Hammond)	"Sandy"	John Travolta	N
25 December 1978	Floid Pearce + 5 other males	"Summer Nights"	John Travolta and Olivia Newton-John	N
13 August 1981	Alex (with Gill Clark)	"How Deep Is Your Love" section of Startrax Club Disco	StarTrax	Y
24 September 1981	Jeremy (with Lulu Cartwright)	"Endless Love"	Lionel Richie	Y

In latter-day radio and newspaper interviews and two books claims have been made that an additional dancer appeared in Legs & Co. during their Top of the Pops tenure variously as a full member, a two-time contributor, or in an unspecified precursor of the group. However, there is no independent evidence for any further female dancers from either primary BBC sources or the shows themselves. In addition, an original member stated "[she] was never ... in Legs and Co, either in cabaret with us or appearing on TOTPs".

==== Timeline ====
The following displays the timeline for Top of the Pops dancers between 1974 and 1983, showing the transition of dancers between the troupes. This is a complete list, with the following exceptions and notes:

- Other than those who appeared in previous troupes, Zoo dancers are not shown – the performances by previous troupe members are shown individually rather than as a time period.
- Non-troupe dancers brought in by individual acts for other performances on Top of the Pops are not listed
- Audience participants are not listed
- The Pan's People Jungle Rock animal performers are assumed to be the dancers themselves therefore not indicated with 'Others'.
- The Legs & Co Jungle Rock animal performers are listed though their professional status is unknown, they are listed as 'Others'
- DJs are not listed where they appeared in a dance
- Ruth Pearson's appearance on 'Harvest for the World' on 22 July 1976 is shown
- The 'Others' are composed of the Ruth Pearson appearance, Legs & Co Jungle Rock performers, Floid Pearce in his Legs & Co performances and the uncredited males on 'Summer Nights'.
- The uncredited Legs & Co. repeats of 31 December 1981 are shown

The full-height vertical lines indicate the last performance of each troupe.

=== Reception ===
Legs & Co. gained a pin up status much like Pan's People. According to Lulu Cartwright, "We didn't really think about it all that much. It was very flattering. People would come up to you in the street. It wasn't overbearing and certainly not a problem. You could go out of your front door without someone recognising you."

=== The final year of Legs & Co. on Top of the Pops ===
By 1981, a new producer, Michael Hurll, frequently relegated Legs and Co to backing dancers. Also by this time, they were often not used as producers found it easier to use a video than include a routine. By July, the dancers knew their tenure was soon ending. Their last lead performance was on 15 October 1981 to The Tweets' "The Birdie Song"; and on 29 October they danced behind Haircut 100 during their performance of "Favourite Shirts (Boy Meets Girl)".

On 5 November 1981, a week after Legs & Co.'s final on-screen appearance, Zoo, the final featured dance troupe to appear on Top of the Pops, made their debut. They were choreographed by Colby, and consisted of a rotating pool of 12 male and 12 female performers. Their first performance was dancing to Twilight by ELO.

== Legs & Co. members after Top of the Pops ==
=== Later Top of the Pops appearances ===
On 17 December 1981, Sue Menhenick made a final appearance on TOTP, with a solo routine to "I'll Find My Way Home" by Jon & Vangelis. This marked Menhenick's final appearance as a dancer on Top of the Pops after over seven years, and probably the most appearances by any dancer, and making her the second longest serving dancer on the programme, Sue was credited as a member of Zoo in the end credits for the programme, making her unique in being credited for appearing as a member of four different dance troupes in her time on TOTP.

The whole troupe appeared uncredited on 31 December 1981 'Hits of 1981' Top of the Pops, dancing behind Shakin' Stevens whilst he sang Green Door (originally aired 13 August 1981), and with Aneka and Japanese Boy (originally aired 27 August 1981).

On the 12 August 1982 edition of 'TOTP', for the opening number, Anita Chellamah (under the surname Mahadervan) appears with the group Toto Coelo performing their hit 'I Eat Cannibals Part 1'. Presenter John Peel makes no mention of Anita's past association with either Legs & Co or 'TOTP'. Anita and Toto Coelo appeared two weeks later on 28 August 1982 edition of 'TOTP' to perform 'I Eat Cannibals Part 1' again.

In a retrospective segment on the 1000th and 20th anniversary editions of Top of the Pops, broadcast on 5 May 1983 and 5 January 1984, a photo of Legs & Co briefly appeared on screen.

=== Legs & Co. after Top of the Pops ===
After their last appearance on Top of the Pops, Legs & Co. spent a further four years performing at corporate events and cabaret shows. However several members had left at the end of the Top of the Pops period; the new line-up had Hammond, Cartwright and Menhenick joined by Patricia McSherry (who also danced with Dee Dee Wilde's Pan's People), Sandra Easby and Liz Green. Ruth Pearson and Flick Colby ceased to manage the group; Cartwright managed the group in this latter period. This line-up appeared in a 1982 television commercial for the Milk Marketing Board as part of their Gotta Lotta Bottle campaign.

Later Easby and Green left and Tanya Lee joined. In 1983 this line-up appeared on TV-am, where the group discussed looking for a new name and perform a routine. The group were eventually renamed Smax (one of the losing names in the 1976 naming competition) for the remainder of their existence.

Patti Hammond died following a long illness on 15 September 2021, at the age of 71.

=== Documentaries and other appearances ===
- Gill Clark made a brief acting appearance in Minder in 1980.
- Pauline Peters made a brief acting appearance in Tenko in 1981.
- Lulu and Patti appeared on Never Mind the Buzzcocks in the 'Identity Parade' feature in 1997.
- The original Legs & Co. line-up were reunited in late 2000 to take part in a documentary on the history of Top of the Pops named "Top of the Pops: The True Story". In the programme, they discussed their memories of their time on the show. The documentary was first transmitted on 1 January 2001, repeated in December 2001, and a revised repeat was shown on 30 July 2006, the same day the final regular edition of Top of the Pops was broadcast.
- The six original members also appeared on an edition of Ant & Dec's Saturday Night Takeaway in January 2003 to surprise a member of the studio audience who had written to Jim'll Fix It as a child wishing to dance with Legs & Co., but whose request didn't make the series. The girls, minus Patti Hammond, along with the surprised member of the audience, later danced to Sister Sledge's "We Are Family", the first time members of Legs & Co. had danced on a British television series for 22 years.
- Legs & Co members have appeared three times on Shaun Tilley's Top of the Pop Playback, each time with Sue Menhenick, and additionally with Pauline Peters on 18 December 2016, Rosie Hetherington on 25 June 2017 and Lulu Cartwright on 19 June 2016.

=== 2011 Top of the Pops rerun ===
From April 2011, the BBC began showing on BBC4 and iplayer weekly all broadcastable episodes from the BBC library from April 1976 onwards which from original dates in October 1976 covered the Legs & Co period on the programme. As master tapes for 9 episodes in the Legs & Co era are not held by the BBC, all these shows were absent from the rerun, except the 31 March 1977 edition, where an off-air recording was used. From October 2012, editions covered by DJs who formed part of Operation Yewtree were no longer rebroadcast as part of the ongoing rerun.

Sue Menhenick and Lulu Cartwright appeared as interviewees of the BBCs' The Story of Top of the Pops, produced at the start of each rerun year, for the year 1978, and Menhenick on her own for 1979 and 1981.
