= The Beat Room =

British TV music series 1964–1965

- Directed by: James Moir
- Presented by: Pat Campbell
- No. of seasons: 1
- No. of episodes: 29

Production
- Producer: Barry Langford
- Production company: BBC

Original release
- Network: BBC Two
- Release: 6 July 1964 – 29 January 1965

The Beat Room is a British television series presenting beat, rhythm and blues and other pop music, shown on BBC2 from 1964 – 1965.

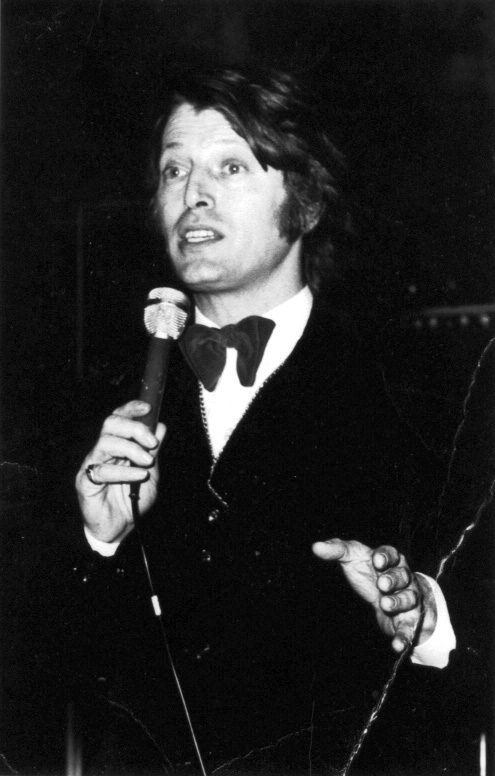
Barry Langford, producer

== Production ==
The series was produced by Barry Langford and directed by James Moir. Acts, introduced by an off-screen presenter, Pat Campbell, performed live before an audience. The resident house band was initially Wayne Gibson and the Dynamic Sounds, but was replaced by Peter and the Headlines mid-run. The show also featured a sextet of female performance dancers, the Beat Girls formed from an existing group, the Katy-Dids. In all, 29 programmes were made.

The first show, broadcast on Monday 6 July 1964 at 6.35 p.m., featured The Animals, Lulu & the Luvvers, and Millie Small. The show was broadcast on Mondays, with Saturday repeats during the middle of the run. The final show was shown on 29 January 1965.

There was a 75-minute New Year's Eve special in 1964, Beat in the New.

Tapes of all but one of the programmes were later destroyed. The only remaining programme (originally broadcast on 5 October 1964) held by the BBC featured Tom Jones, Julie Rogers, The Kinks, John Lee Hooker, and The Syndicats. This was repeated on BBC4 in 2007.

The show also featured the debut Television performance by The Who, when they were still calling themselves The High Numbers. Performing 2 songs, 'Bring It On Home' and 'Dance To Keep From Crying', they appeared on the August 24th 1964 edition. No visual or audio exists.

The following episode listing is based on Radio Times information

Episode	Date	Sat Repeat	Notes
1	6-JUL-64	N	First edition, Wayne Gibson resident group, programmes 25 minutes long
2	13-JUL-64	N	Inez Foxx, Long John Baldry, The Animals, Wayne Gibson resident group
3	20-JUL-64	N	The Animals, The McKinleys, The Nashville Teens, The Beat Girls, Wayne Gibson resident group
4	27-JUL-64	N	Kenny Lynch and the Echoes, Elkie Brooks, Georgie Fame, Davy Jones and the King Bees, The Beat Girls, Wayne Gibson resident group
5	3-AUG-64	N	Manfred Mann, and the Manfreds, Jimmy Powell and the Five Dimensions, The Barron Knights, Wayne Gibson resident group
6	10-AUG-64	N	Memphis Slim, Manfred Mann, The Untamed Four, Marianne Faithfull, Long John Baldry and The Hoochie Coochie Men, The Beat Girls, Wayne Gibson resident group
7	17-AUG-64	N	Tommy Tucker, Christine Holmes, The Cherokees, Troy Dante and the Infernos, The Naturals, Wayne Gibson resident group
8	24-AUG-64	N	Brenda Lee, The Swinging Blue Jeans, Tommy Tucker, Wayne Gibson resident group
9	31-AUG-64	N	The Hollies, Screaming Lord Sutch, Tammy St. John and the Trends, The Rockin' Berries, Wayne Gibson resident group
10	7-SEP-64	N	Georgie Fame and the Blue Flames, Dave Berry, Lesley Gore, The Pretty Things, Wayne Gibson resident group
11	14-SEP-64	Y	Bill Haley and his Comets, Peter and Gordon, Zoot Money and the Big Roll Band, Sally Kelly, The Wranglers, The Beat Girls, Wayne Gibson resident group. Extended to 30 minutes from this edition on
12	21-SEP-64	Y	Lulu and the Luvvers, The Animals, Cliff Bennett and the Rebel Rousers, The Wackers, Wayne Gibson resident group
13	28-SEP-64	Y	Little Eva, Herman's Hermits, Alexis Korner's Blues Incorporated, The Badd Boys, The Beat Girls, Wayne Gibson resident group
14	5-OCT-64	Y	Surviving episode
15	12-OCT-64	Y	Brian Poole and the Tremeloes, Chris Farlowe and the Thunderbirds, The Beat Chicks, The Roosters, The Beat Girls, Wayne Gibson resident group
16	19-OCT-64	Y	Named 'Beat Extra' Dionne Warwick, Carl Perkins, The Honeycombs, The Nashville Teens, The Hell Raisers, The Beat Girls, Wayne Gibson resident group
17	26-OCT-64	Y	Julie Grant, The Dixie Cups, Little Walter, Peter and the Headlines, The Roosters, The Beat Girls, Wayne Gibson resident group
18	2-NOV-64	Y	Wayne Fontana and the Mindbenders, Diana Dors, The Breakaways, Sugar Pie Desanto, The Moody Blues, The Rockin' Vickers, The Beat Girls. Switch to Peter and the Headlines as resident group
19	9-NOV-64	Y	
20	16-NOV-64	Y	
21	23-NOV-64	Y	
22	30-NOV-64	Y	
23	7-DEC-64	Y	
24	14-DEC-64	Y	
25	21-DEC-64	Y	
26	28-DEC-64	N	
-	31-DEC-64	N	New Year's Eve special, 'Beat in the New'
-	4-JAN-65	-	No episode
27	11-JAN-65	N	
28	18-JAN-65	N	
29	25-JAN-65	N	Final episode

=== The Beat Girls ===
The Beat Girls were choreographed by Gary Cockrell and co-managed by Cockrell and Valerie Hyman. They are most famous today for providing most of the dancers who formed Pan's People though most joined after the Beat Room period. They were based out of the Dance Centre.

The line-up from July to October 1964 was:

- Ann Chapman
- Babs Lord
- Jo Cook
- Jenny Ferle
- Lynn Wolseley
- Ruth Pearson

This line-up is seen on the remaining publicly available footage of the Beat Girls on the Beat Room performing to "Whole Lotta Shakin' Goin' On".

They also appeared in the film Gonks Go Beat.

Jo Cook's period in the group ended in October 1964 due to an allegation of already being under contract; however by the following month she had formed the Go-Jos for Top of the Pops, winning the work ahead of the Beat Girls. Carlotta Barrow replaced her as a regular member, having already done some performances in the group.

== Replacement programme ==
The programme was replaced in its same BBC2 timeslot by Gadzooks!, named after Carlotta 'Zooks' Barrow from the Beat Girls. The show was again produced by Barry Langford with the Beat Girls also appearing as part of the main line-up every week. The series underwent three name changes during its 7 months on the air:

Gadzooks! It's All Happening 1 February 1965 - 24 May 1965

Gadzooks! It's The in Crowd 31 May 1965 - 5 July 1965

Gadzooks! 12 July 1965 - 27 September 1965

== The Beat Girls after The Beat Room ==
The group had several distinct lineups in its remaining history:

=== January 1965–August 1965 - Gadzooks! ===
Performing on the weekly Gadzooks! shows with the later Beat Room line-up.

=== October 1965–December 1966 - UK and Dutch TV programmes ===
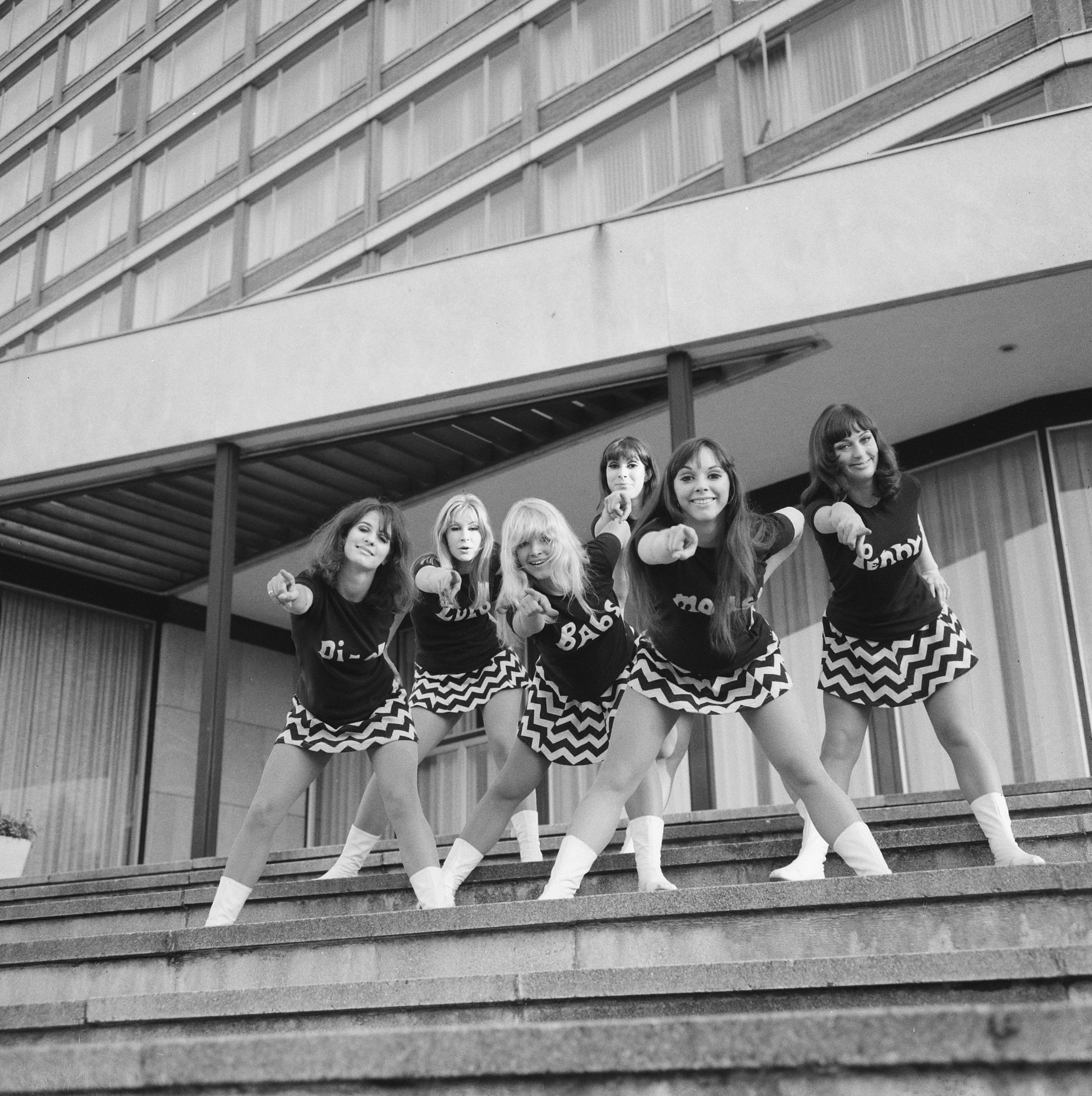
The Beat Girls (1966), from left, Dee Dee Wilde, Lorelly Harris, Babs Lord, Diane South, Flick Colby, Penny Fergusson

The Gadzooks! programmes finished in August 1965, and the group ceased to appear on a regular UK music programme. Carlotta Barrow quit the group to appear in films and then design film sets.

In October 1965, the Beat Girls start appearing on a new Dutch AVRO show, Moef Ga Ga.

In early 1966, several of the original dancers quit. Ann Chapman first went into films and later joined the Dougie Squires' Young Generation, following him into the Second Generation. Ruth Pearson, Lyn Wolseley and Jenny Ferne left and formed a new group, Tomorrow's People which, as well as working in the UK, appeared on Aaah-Dele in the Netherlands.

Several new dancers joined. Flick Colby joined in January 1966, followed by Dee Dee Wilde in March, and Lorelly Harris and Penny Fergusson in May.

The lineup by mid-1966 was:

- Flick Colby
- Diane South
- Dee Dee Wilde
- Lorelly Harris
- Penny Fergusson
- Babs Lord

An AVRO Dutch programme, Felicity, based around Flick Colby was made in May and shown on 6 September 1966. This was an entrant to the Munich film festival.

The appeared on the ATV Dickie Valentine Show in July–August 1966. Lesley Judd also appeared in this programme.

However the Dutch performances led to a dispute over wages and allowances for the UK-based dancers, and in December 1966, all the dancers except South quit, forming Pan's People.

=== January 1967–May 1968 - Dutch TV programmes ===
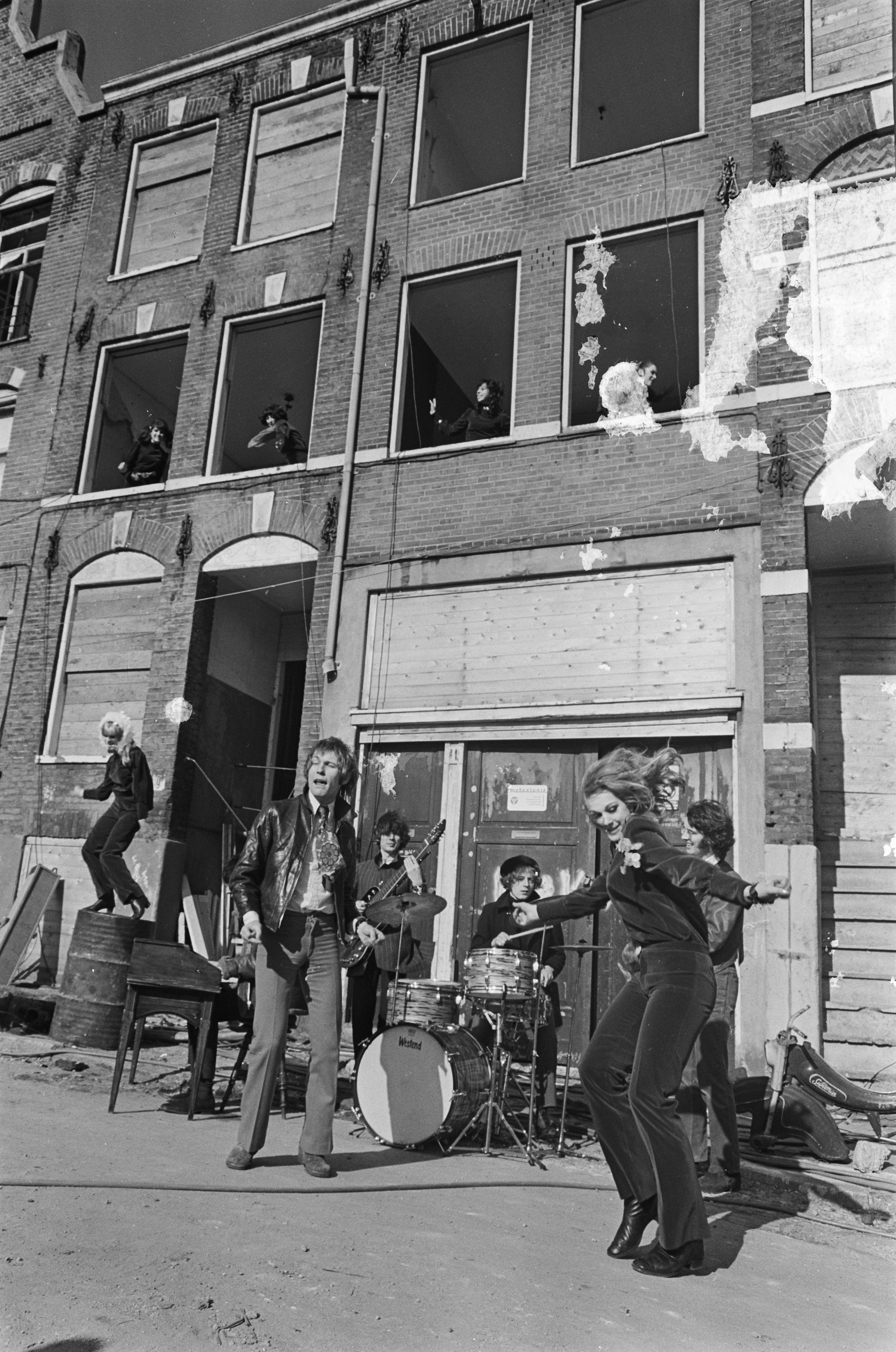
April 1968: Manfred Mann with the Beat Girls on Moef Ga Ga.

Following the walk-out of the now Pan's People dancers, six Dutch dancers were recruited in open auditions, and with Diane South as both dancer and choreographer, the group continued to appear on Dutch TV shows.

The original lineup in January 1967 was:

- Anke Luthart
- Hannah de Leeuwe
- Elsa Voelker
- Rita Gardeslen
- Rosa Ebbeling
- Linda Kraay
- Diane South

In January 68 Penney de Jager joined the group.

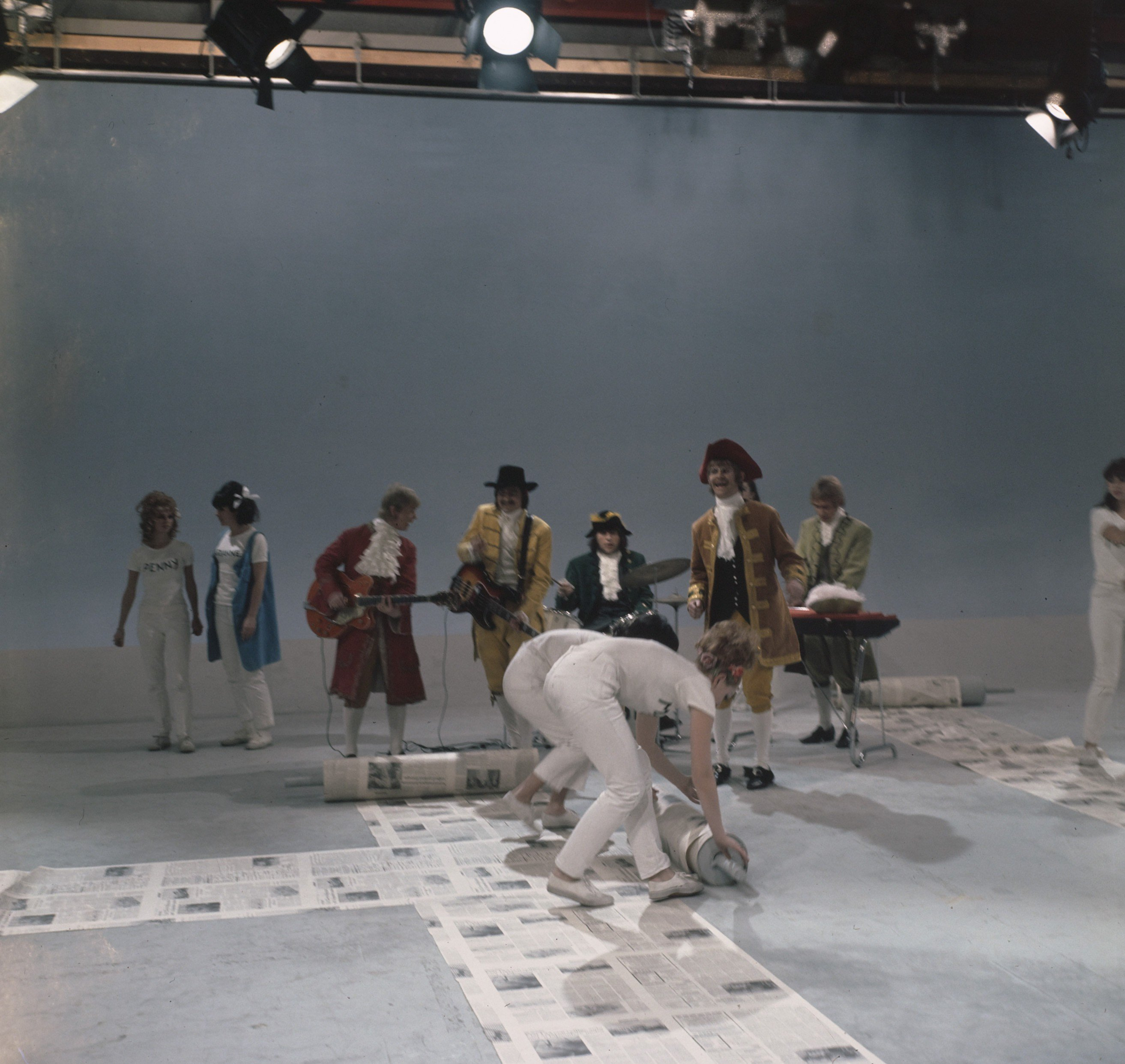
January 1968: Penney de Jager speaking to choreographer and fellow dancer Diane South (far left) in the Beat Girls with group The Honest Men on Moef Ga Ga.

Moef Ga Ga ended in May 1968, to be succeeded by Toppop with Penney de Jager as choreographer. The Dutch Beat Girls also ended with Moef Ga Ga.

=== January 1967-July 1968 - UK appearances ===
A different UK-based line up, with Diane South also appearing, occasionally did performances including a BBC show with Jimmy Tarbuck and with Bob Monkhouse. The Bob Monkhouse performers were:

- Mandy Rawlings
- Diane South
- Alison Minto
- Maggie Vincent
