= Alan David =

Alan David may refer to:

- Alan David (actor), British actor appeared from 1974 to 1977 in The Squirrels
- Alan David (singer), British pop singer, appeared on Gadzooks! from 1965
