= Gonks Go Beat =

1964 British film by Robert Hartford-Davis

- Region 2 DVD cover
- Directed by: Robert Hartford-Davis
- Written by: Robert Hartford-Davis; Peter Newbrook
- Produced by: Peter Newbrook
- Starring: Kenneth Connor; Frank Thornton; Terry Scott
- Cinematography: Peter Newbrook
- Edited by: Teddy Darvas
- Music by: Various
- Production company: Titan Film Productions
- Distributed by: Anglo-Amalgamated Film Distributors
- Release dates: 21 May 1965 (Australia); September 1965
- Running time: 92 minutes
- Country: United Kingdom
- Language: English

Gonks Go Beat is a 1964 British science fiction/musical fantasy film, directed by Robert Hartford-Davis, starring Kenneth Connor and Frank Thornton. It was written by Hartford-Davis and Peter Newbrook loosely based on the Romeo and Juliet storyline and features 16 musical numbers performed by a variety of artists, including Lulu and The Luvvers, The Nashville Teens and the Graham Bond Organisation including Ginger Baker, Jack Bruce and Dick Heckstall-Smith. The film includes an early appearance by the actor Derek Thompson performing with his twin sister Elaine.

The film's title highlights the fad for gonk toys in mid 1960s Great Britain. The gonks appear in the opening title credits, as Lulu sings the theme song "Chocolate Ice".

Editor Teddy Darvas said "I am very proud of that, it's in the book of the world's worst movies and I cut one of them."

== Plot ==
At a point in the distant future, the inhabitants of Planet Earth have become divided into two factions who despise each other. In Beatland live the hip and trendy people who have long hair, dress in polo neck jumpers, jeans and sunglasses and listen to cool beat music. Their counterparts on Ballad Isle keep their hair short and tidy, wear button-down shirts and pressed slacks or floral dresses and twinsets, and listen exclusively to crooners. A musical competition is staged annually between the two sides, overseen by the neutral and powerful record company executive Mr. A&R. For the rest of the year they regard each other with suspicion and antipathy, although they are not above sneaking into each other's territory to steal musical ideas.

Meanwhile, the overlords of a far-flung galaxy have been observing the squabblings and goings-on on Planet Earth with increasing exasperation. Finally, their patience with the earthlings is pushed beyond its limit and they decide to send their bungling representative Wilco Roger to sort the situation out and bring about a reconciliation between the parties, with the warning that if he fails he'll be exiled to Planet Gonk, a fearsome and dreaded place where spherical furry soft toys shuffle around all day listening to Dixieland jazz.

On arrival, Wilco Roger makes contact with Mr. A&R. They're aware of a forbidden romance between a Beatland boy and a Ballad Isle girl, and use a combination of Mr. A&R's cunning and Wilco Roger's mystical powers to enable the couple to get together without fear and come up with a musical composition which will be acceptable to both sides. The time for the annual competition comes around, and the inhabitants are appalled when the Beatland boy and the Ballad Isle girl take to the stage together. But their song "Takes Two to Make Love" turns out to be the hit of the night, loved by both sides of the musical divide. Mr. A&R declares it the unquestioned winner and orders an end to the silliness as it has now been proved that everyone can live together and learn to appreciate all types of music.

== Cast ==
- Kenneth Connor as Wilco Roger
- Frank Thornton as Mr. A&R
- Barbara Brown as Helen
- Iain Gregory as Steve
- Terry Scott as PM
- Reginald Beckwith as Professor
- Gary Cockrell as committee man
- Jerry Desmonde as Great Galaxian
- Arthur Mullard as drum master
- Pamela Donald as Tutor
- Gillian French as Beatland Prime Minister
- Carlotta Barrow as Beat girl
- Ann Chapman as Beat girl
- Jo Cook as Beat girl
- Babs Lord as Beat girl
- Sarah Martin as Beat girl
- Lyn Symonds as Beat girl
- Lulu and the Luvvers as themselves
- The Nashville Teens as themselves
- The Vacqueros as themselves
- The Trolls as themselves
- The Long and the Short as themselves
- Ray Lewis and the Trekkers as themselves
- Ginger Baker as himself
- Jack Bruce as himself
- Graham Bond as himself
- Dick Heckstall-Smith as himself
- Andy White as himself
- Derek Thompson as singer
- Elaine Thompson as singer
- Alan David as singer

== Select songs ==
- "Harmonica" by Graham Bond Organisation

== Production ==
The film was one of a number of rock musicals financed by Nat Cohen's Anglo Amalgamated.

Critic Philip Jenkinson argued the movie was inspired by sci-fi teen musicals such as Pajama Party (1964).

Filming started 23 October 1964.

Jack Bruce later recalled the filming: "That was bizarre. You had to get up at some time in the middle of the night, and then just wait around for ages. It was really boring and then miming for five minutes. We looked very strange, with the shades on. But it's like film making, you know there's a lot of standing around."

== Critical reception ==
=== Contemporary ===
Monthly Film Bulletin wrote: "An unusually uninventive script and dialogue containing hardly a trace of wit defeat even Kenneth Connor's comedy expertise. Otherwise the film is simply a succession of musical numbers, in which the ballad tends to outweigh the beat, several of the numbers being unabashedly tuneful. There are also dance-ensembles, the most ambitious of which is a battle between two armies whose weapons are electric guitars, maraccas and similarly suitable instruments. A mass drumming exhibition makes noise enough to satisfy the most demanding audience."

Kine Weekly wrote: "With its mixture of pop-music, bright colour and some good comic ideas, this should prove popular among youngsters everywhere. Out of the-ordinary young fare. ...This is another case of a bright idea not coming off as well as it might have done. The basic plot is entertaining, but teenagers, for whom, presumably, the film was principally made, would surely have appreciated jokes not quite so juvenile, Apart from this, however, there are some good and striking inventions: a beat group practising in sports cars on an aerodrome runway; a "prison" in which drummers beat out their atonement for crime; and of course, the musical battle. The comedians concerned. Kenneth Connor (Wilco). Terry Scott (prime minister) and Frank Thornton (Mr. A. and R), deserve more adult script, but the two youngsters have voices and personalities that are delightfully pleasing."

The film was released in Australia on a double bill with Mods and Rockers (1964). The Age called it "so woeful that it beggars description."

=== Later reviews ===
British film historian I.Q. Hunter included the film in his list of contenders for "the worst British film ever made".

For The Spinning Image Graeme Clark wrote, "time has been kinder to its daft novelty than a few of its peers, although that doesn't mean it's any good, it has just grown quainter with age."

TV Guide gave the film one and a half stars and wrote, "only fans of obscure mod bands will enjoy this teen exploitation item."

Cinedelica wrote, "a fairly enjoyable, if very dated, slice of period silliness."

Shock Cinema wrote "There was no way I could have anticipated the foreheadslapping, jaw-dropping silliness that oozes from this ultra-colorful, British sci-fi/musical/fantasy. Just try to imagine a live action Yellow Submarine meets The Brady Bunch Hour. It ain't pretty, but there's a lot to enjoy, beginning with spastic cartoon/puppet credits that'll jump-start any LSD dropped by lucky viewers."

== DVD Releases ==
The film was released on DVD in the UK in 2007 by Optimum Home Entertainment, who described it as "the Plan 9 from Outer Space of film musicals", a comparison originally coined by the UK film critic Mark Kermode.
