= Moon Zero Two =

1969 British film by Roy Ward Baker

- British quad crown release poster
- Directed by: Roy Ward Baker
- Screenplay by: Michael Carreras
- Story by: Martin Davison; Frank Hardman; Gavin Lyall
- Produced by: Michael Carreras
- Starring: James Olson; Catherine Schell; Warren Mitchell; Adrienne Corri
- Cinematography: Paul Beeson
- Edited by: Spencer Reeve
- Music by: Don Ellis
- Production company: Hammer Films
- Distributed by: Warner-Pathé; Warner Bros.-Seven Arts
- Release dates: 26 October 1969 (UK); 5 March 1970 (US)
- Running time: 100 minutes
- Country: United Kingdom
- Language: English
- Budget: £500,000

Moon Zero Two is a 1969 British science fiction film from Hammer Films, directed by Roy Ward Baker and starring James Olson, Catherine Schell, Warren Mitchell, and Adrienne Corri. The screenplay was by Michael Carreras from an original story by Gavin Lyall, Frank Hardman, and Martin Davison.

The film takes place on the Moon in 2021. A former astronaut turned salvager helps a millionaire space industrialist capture a sapphire asteroid, while also helping a woman find her missing brother.

== Plot ==
In May 2021, the Moon is in the process of being colonized, and this new frontier is attracting a diverse human population to lunar settlements like Moon City, Farside 5, and others.

Two denizens of this rough-and-tumble lunar society are the notorious millionaire J.J. Hubbard and former-astronaut-turned-satellite-salvager Bill Kemp, the first man to set foot on Mars. He left Space Corporation because he wants to explore space, while his former employer only wants to operate commercial passenger flights to and from Mars and Venus.

When Hubbard hears about a small 6000-tonne asteroid made of pure "ceramic" sapphire that is in a low lunar orbit, he hires Kemp to capture it with Kemp's old Moon 02 space ferry. Kemp is to transport it down to the surface of the lunar farside, even though doing so would be against Space Corporation law. Kemp, however, has little choice because he learns from Hubbard that his flight licence will soon be revoked due to protests from Space Corporation. Hubbard also reveals that he plans to use the giant sapphire for building much improved rocket engine thermal insulators, profiting from the need for even more powerful rockets to colonize Mercury and the moons of Jupiter.

A young woman named Clementine arrives looking for her brother, a miner/prospector, working a distant patch of moonscape at Spectacle Crater on the lunar farside. Unfortunately, the trip from Moon City on the nearside takes six days by a wheeled lunar vehicle. Since Kemp can go there much more quickly using his Moon 02, she convinces him to help her learn if her brother is still alive. The terrain around his camp is not suitable, so Kemp and Clementine land and travel the remaining distance with a transport buggy. The two discover that Clementine's brother is dead, and that he was murdered for his discovery of a large vein of nickel, that would make him a rich man. They are shot at by some of Hubbard's men, who have followed them to the camp; Kemp takes them out one-by-one.

Hubbard is unhappy that Kemp left to assist Clementine, because Hubbard is the one responsible for her brother's death. He needs the claim to be abandoned so he can take control of it and use it as an isolated landing site for the sapphire asteroid. Hubbard forces Kemp to complete the asteroid job by threatening his and Clementine's lives. Kemp is later forced to kill one of Hubbard's men in a shoot out. He also strands Hubbard and his remaining man on the large sapphire, just before the attached retro-rockets fire, sending it hurtling toward the lunar surface. With Clementine being her brother's next of kin, she now has legal ownership of the nickel vein and the nearby "crashed" sapphire asteroid, making her a very wealthy woman.

== Cast ==
- James Olson as Bill Kemp
- Catherina von Schell as Clementine Taplin
- Warren Mitchell as J. J. Hubbard
- Adrienne Corri as Elizabeth Murphy
- Ori Levy as Korminski
- Dudley Foster as Whitsun
- Bernard Bresslaw as Harry
- Neil McCallum as space captain
- Joby Blanshard as Smith
- Michael Ripper as 1st card player
- Robert Tayman as 2nd card player
- Sam Kydd as barman
- Keith Bonnard as Junior customs officer
- Leo Britt as Senior customs officer
- Carol Cleveland as hostess
- Roy Evans as workman
- Tom Kempinski as 2nd officer
- Lew Luton as immigration officer
- Claire Shenstone as female hotel clerk
- Chrissie Shrimpton as boutique attendant
- Amber Dean Smith as Hubbard's girlfriend
- Simone Silvera as Hubbard's girlfriend
- The Gojos as Hilton bar dancing girls

== Production ==
Moon Zero Two was written by Michael Carreras, based on a story by Martin Davison, Frank Hardman and Gavin Lyall. Lyall's widow, Katharine Whitehorn, wrote retrospectively in her 2007 autobiography, Selective Memory: "It was about—or supposed to be about—space travel when it had got to the beat-up-old-Dakota stage of grubby reality.… The people who made it were dazzled by Kubrick's 2001 and couldn't resist trying to make it glossy and improbably perfect, the exact opposite of what the authors intended: all the gritty realism was gone."

The score was by Philip Martell and American jazz musician Don Ellis, his first film score. The title song was performed by Julie Driscoll. Spencer Reeve was the film editor and Carl Toms was costume designer. Special visual effects for the film were created by a team headed by visual effects artist Les Bowie, who worked on numerous Hammer productions and other British-made science fiction features.

Production began on 8 March 1969, focusing on the special effects. Live-action filming began on 31 March at the Associated British Studios. Dance group the Go-Jos appeared in the film. Ori Levy described wearing the moonsuits as "sheer hell", receiving blisters from chafing and back problems from the air conditioner installed to keep him cool. Catherine Schell lost 13 pounds from wearing the suit, causing her to be put on a diet of malted milk and chocolate to maintain her weight. Principal photography wrapped on 10 June. The effects unit at Bray Studios was used on the production.

Among the futuristic set decorations are several examples of the famous "Ball Chair" created in 1966 by Finnish designer Eero Aarnio. A dialogue reference to Neil Armstrong becoming the first man on the Moon was inserted, and a lunar monument erected on the landing site was added to the production. The film was released three months after the Apollo 11 Moon landing.

In a 1992 interview with Starlog, Roy Ward Baker was negative towards the film, lamenting its budget for hindering plot possibilities and what he saw as the miscasting of James Olson in the lead role. Baker was also critical of producer and writer Michael Carreras' roles with the film; while being fine with his producing, he thought Carreras overstretched himself with his positions. Baker said: "Moon Zero Two was a bad picture. It was hopeless, and never got off the ground. We didn't have enough money to do it properly. It was crazy—a complete muddle. And, it was undercut by the fact that you could turn on the television and see Neil Armstrong jumping about on the real Moon."

Catherine Schell herself was critical of the resulting film. In her autobiography A Constant Alien she relates that years later she received as a gift an anthology book of the worst films ever made with a still of her in the notorious spacesuit and an added cartoon balloon reading "I knew what I had to do to get on this movie but what do I have to do to get off it?"

== Release ==
In the U.S. the film was billed as a space Western with the phrase "The first moon 'western'".

== Critical reception ==
Variety wrote that the film "never makes up its mind whether it is a spoof or a straightforward adventure yarn and the uneasy combo comes adrift even in the normally capable hands of producer Michael Carreras (who also wrote the script) and director Roy Ward Baker. It may provide some mild amusement for easygoing audiences but overall it's a fairly dull experience, despite some capable artwork, special effects and lensing by Paul Bessen".

The Monthly Film Bulletin wrote: "It is something of a relief to find from this much-publicised "first space Western" that in 50 years time so little will have changed. ...The scenery in this new sub-genre may be less inspiring than usual, but the dialogue, plot and everything else are on a sufficiently familiar level to appeal to less demanding juvenile audiences. ... Catherina von Schell looks winsome enough, Warren Mitchell leers prettily and Bernard Bresslaw is conventionally moronic as the Moon magnate's gunslinger-in-chief. It's all just about bad enough to fill older audiences with nostalgia for the inspired innocence of Flash Gordon, or even the good old days of Abbott and Costello in outer space."

Derek Malcolm for The Guardian called the film "dreadfully made from start to finish".

In The Radio Times Guide to Films David McGillivray gave the film two out of five stars, writing: "In an effort to diversify, Hammer attempted this U certificate space western, in which James Olson and Ori Levy do battle with the bad guys for prospecting rights on a somewhat bleak-looking moon. It's exactly what you might expect from a western set on the moon, complete with shoot-outs, ambushes and dancing girls. The plot and dialoque are terrible, though there are a few thrills for the kids."

== Home media ==
Moon Zero Two became a Warner Bros. shared DVD disc release in 2008, along with Hammer Films' 1970 prehistoric adventure When Dinosaurs Ruled the Earth. In 2011, Moon Zero Two was re-released as a stand-alone DVD, adding the film's original theatrical trailer.

== Legacy ==
In 1969, Pan Books released a novelisation of Moon Zero Two, written by John Burke. It was also adapted into a graphic story by Paul Neary and was published in The House of Hammer in April 1977.

== Mystery Science Theater 3000 ==
The film was shown and parodied in Mystery Science Theater 3000 episode #111, originally airing January 20, 1990, on The Comedy Channel. When contributing comments about the episode, writer Michael J. Nelson claimed not to remember Moon Zero Two and said when he asked the rest of the staff and performers at MST3K, "Not a single person had a single concrete memory to recall."

As he does with most of the first-season episodes, writer Jim Vorel gives Moon Zero Two a low rating; in his comprehensive list of MST3K episodes for Paste, he places the episode near the bottom, at #186. (Note: Ranking based on 197 episodes as of 2018.) He labels Moon Zero Two a "light, goofy-looking '60s sci-fi movie" that is a "less painful film" than those featured in most other Season 1 episodes. His low ranking is a factor of the slower and more awkward riffing from Joel and the 'bots, but he also points out the jokes about "distracting brass band music throughout" as a highlight.

Shout! Factory released the episode on DVD as part of the box set Mystery Science Theater 3000: The 25th Anniversary Edition on December 10, 2013. The Moon Zero Two disc includes an introduction by Hammer Film Productions historian Constantine Nasr and the film's original trailer. Other episodes included in the collection are Gorgo (episode #909), The Day the Earth Froze (episode #422), Mitchell (episode #512), The Brain That Wouldn't Die (episode #513), and The Leech Woman (episode #802).

The episode was rebroadcast on social media as the MST3K LIVE Social Distancing Riff-Along Special on 3 May 2020, with new riffs by the MST3K Great Cheesy Circus Tour cast.

== Sources ==
- Fellner, Chris (2019). The Encyclopedia of Hammer Films. Rowman & Littlefield. ISBN 9781538126592.
- Johnson, Tom; Del Vecchio, Deborah (1996). Hammer Films: An Exhausted Filmography. McFarland. ISBN 9780786469222.
- Smith, Gary A. (1 January 2006). Uneasy Dreams: The Golden Age of British Horror Films, 1956–1976. McFarland. ISBN 9780786426614.
