= Wayne Gibson =

British singer (1942–2004)

Wayne Gibson was the stage name of Edward William "Bill" Allen (15 December 1942 – 1 April 2004). He was an English pop singer who had two hits on the UK Singles Chart, "Kelly" in 1964 and "Under My Thumb" in 1974.

== Career ==
In the early 1960s, he was lead singer in a South London-based band, the Tornadoes (unrelated to the instrumental group, the Tornados), who then changed their name to Wayne Gibson & the Dynamic Sounds. Other band members included Mick Todman (lead guitar), Ray Rogers (bass), Pete Gillies (rhythm guitar) and Larry Cole (drums). In 1961-62, they performed at the Top Ten Club in Hamburg, Germany.

In 1963, they won a recording deal with Decca Records, where their records were produced by American-born Shel Talmy, at that time the producer of the Bachelors (and later of the Kinks and the Who, among others). However, the group's first two singles, cover versions of Ray Sharpe's "Linda Lu" and Ritchie Valens' "Come On, Let's Go", were not successful, and they moved on to the Pye label. Their next record, a version of Del Shannon's "Kelly" which featured session musician Jimmy Page on guitar, reached No. 48 on the UK Singles Chart in March 1964, but the follow-up, "Portland Town", was not a hit. The group moved on again, to the Columbia label and then Parlophone, where they released a version of "Ding-Dong! The Witch Is Dead" from the 1939 film The Wizard of Oz. In 1964-65, they also appeared regularly as the backing-band on the BBC TV programme The Beat Room. Among artists backed by Gibson and his group were Millie Small, Long John Baldry, the Kinks, Herman's Hermits, Chris Farlowe, Manfred Mann, the Pretty Things, the Animals and Lulu and the Luvvers.

Gibson's later recordings were as a solo singer. In May 1966, he released a version of the Rolling Stones' "Under My Thumb", produced by Terry King. Again, it was not immediately a hit, and nor was his next record, a version of the Beatles' "For No One".

Gibson did not record after 1966 and seems to have left the professional entertainment business at that time. However, in 1972, the small Kingdom label reissued "For No One" in the UK. By 1974, "Under My Thumb" had become well known on the Northern soul club scene, and it was reissued on the Pye Disco Demand label. It rose to No. 17 on the UK chart in late 1974, and Gibson briefly re-emerged to promote it on Top of the Pops. His version of the song was described by journalist, Stuart Maconie as an "embarrassing novelty Northern soul hit".

== Discography ==
Singles (Releases that did not chart are denoted by "-")
Date	A-Side	B-Side	Peak UK Chart Positions
1963	Beachcomber	Linda Lu	-
1964	Kelly	See You Later Alligator	48
1964	Come On Let's Go	Pop The Whip	-
1965	Portland Town	Please Baby Please	-
1965	One Little Smile	Baby, Baby, Baby Pity Me	-
1965	Ding Dong The Witch Is Dead	In The Night	33
1966	Under My Thumb	It Always Happens	-
1966	For No One	He's Got The Whole World In His Hands	-
1972	The Whole World In His Hands	The Game	-
1972	For No One	He's Got The Whole World In His Hands	-
1974	Under My Thumb	The Game	17
1975	Yesterday's Papers	Don't Waste Time Following Me	-
1975	It's That Time Of The Year	Help The Night Away	-
1981	Under My Thumb	Yesterday's Papers	-
