= Gadzooks! (TV programme) =

1965 British TV pop music show

Gadzooks! is a British pop music television programme which aired on BBC2 from February to September 1965. It was originally produced by Barry Langford and was a replacement for his previous music show The Beat Room which had run in the same timeslot on BBC2 since July 1964.

The programme went through a number of name changes during its 35-episode run, originally being titled Gadzooks! It's All Happening, before changing to Gadzooks! It's The In-Crowd, then finally simply Gadzooks!.

The presenters of the programme included Alan David, Lulu, Roger Whittaker and future Crackerjack! presenter Christine Holmes. Recurring artistes who appeared most weeks included Liverpool singing trio The Three Bells, dance troupe The Beat Girls and blind singer & organist Peter Cook (not to be confused with the comedian of the same name), plus a number of special musical guests every week. Notable acts who performed on the programme included the Who, Tom Jones, Manfred Mann, Marianne Faithfull, the Animals, Chuck Berry, Sonny & Cher, the Byrds, the Four Tops and David Bowie (who appeared twice: both times under his real name of Davy Jones).

No recordings of this series are known to survive.

== Episodes ==
No.	Title	Directed by	Original release date
1	"Gadzooks! It's All Happening"	Barry Langford	1 February 1965
Starring Alan David & Christine Holmes. Featuring Peter Cook, The Three Bells, The Mike Leander Combo and the Beat Girls. This week's guest artists: The Animals, Jan Panter and Tom Jones And The Squires.
2	"Gadzooks! It's All Happening"	Barry Langford	8 February 1965
Starring Alan David & Christine Holmes. Featuring Peter Cook, The Three Bells, The Mike Leander Combo and the Beat Girls. This week's guest artists: The Rockin' Berries and The Graham Bond Organisation.
3	"Gadzooks! It's All Happening"	Barry Langford	15 February 1965
Starring Alan David & Christine Holmes. Featuring Peter Cook, Dorris Henderson, The Three Bells, The Mike Leander Combo and the Beat Girls. This week's guest artists: The Nashville Teens, Dave Dee, Dozy, Beaky, Mick & Tich and Screaming Jay Hawkins.
4	"Gadzooks! It's All Happening"	Barry Langford	22 February 1965
Starring Alan David & Christine Holmes. Featuring Peter Cook, Dorris Henderson, The Three Bells, The Mike Leander Combo and the Beat Girls. This week's guest artists: Long John Baldry and the Hoochie Coochie Men, Marianne Faithfull.
5	"Gadzooks! It's All Happening"	Barry Langford	1 March 1965
Starring Alan David & Christine Holmes. Featuring Peter Cook, Dorris Henderson, The Three Bells, The Mike Leander Combo and the Beat Girls. This week's guest artists: Manfred Mann.
6	"Gadzooks! It's All Happening"	Barry Langford	8 March 1965
Starring Alan David & Christine Holmes. Featuring Peter Cook, Dorris Henderson, The Three Bells, The Mike Leander Combo and the Beat Girls. This week's guest artists: Adrienne Poster and Davy Jones and the Manish Boys.
7	"Gadzooks! It's All Happening"	Barry Langford	15 March 1965
Starring Alan David & Christine Holmes. Featuring Peter Cook, Dorris Henderson, The Three Bells, The Countrymen, Alexis Korner's Blues Inc and the Beat Girls. This week's guest artists: Donovan, The Who and Judi Johnson and the Perfections.
8	"Gadzooks! It's All Happening"	Barry Langford	22 March 1965
Starring Alan David & Christine Holmes. Featuring Peter Cook, Dorris Henderson, The Three Bells, The Countrymen, Alexis Korner's Blues Inc and the Beat Girls. This week's guest artists: Chuck Berry, The Moody Blues and Murray's Monkeys.
9	"Gadzooks! It's All Happening"	Barry Langford	29 March 1965
Starring Alan David & Christine Holmes. Featuring Peter Cook, Dorris Henderson, The Three Bells, The Countrymen, Alexis Korner's Blues Inc and the Beat Girls. This week's guest artists: The Untamed.
10	"Gadzooks! It's All Happening"	Barry Langford	5 April 1965
Starring Alan David & Christine Holmes. Featuring Peter Cook, The Three Bells, The Countrymen, Alexis Korner's Blues Inc and the Beat Girls. This week's guest artists: The Animals.
11	"Gadzooks! It's All Happening"	Barry Langford	12 April 1965
Starring Alan David & Christine Holmes. Featuring Peter Cook, Dorris Henderson, The Three Bells, The Countrymen, Alexis Korner's Blues Inc, John Renbourne and the Beat Girls. This week's guest artists: The Bachelors and Mia Lewis.
12	"Gadzooks! It's All Happening"	Barry Langford	19 April 1965
Starring Alan David & Christine Holmes. Featuring Peter Cook, The Three Bells, Alexis Korner's Blues Inc, John Renbourne and the Beat Girls. This week's guest artists: Them and Eleanor Toner.
13	"Gadzooks! It's All Happening"	Barry Langford	26 April 1965
Starring Alan David & Christine Holmes. Featuring Peter Cook, Dorris Henderson, The Three Bells, Alexis Korner's Blues Inc, John Renbourne and the Beat Girls. This week's guest artists: Tom Jones and The Squires and Lulu and the Luvvers.
14	"Gadzooks! It's All Happening"	Barry Langford	3 May 1965
Starring Alan David & Christine Holmes. Featuring Peter Cook, Dorris Henderson, The Three Bells, Alexis Korner's Blues Inc, John Renbourne and the Beat Girls. This week's guest artists: The Rockin' Berries.
15	"Gadzooks! It's All Happening"	Barry Langford	10 May 1965
Starring Alan David & Christine Holmes. Featuring Peter Cook, Dorris Henderson, The Three Bells, Alexis Korner's Blues Inc, John Renbourne and the Beat Girls. This week's guest artists: The Everly Brothers, Doug Gibbons and Judi Smith.
16	"Gadzooks! It's All Happening"	Barry Langford	17 May 1965
Starring Alan David & Christine Holmes. Featuring Peter Cook, Dorris Henderson, The Three Bells, Alexis Korner's Blues Inc, John Renbourne and the Beat Girls. This week's guest artists: John Lee Hooker and The Nashville Teens.
17	"Gadzooks! It's All Happening"	Barry Langford	24 May 1965
Starring Alan David & Christine Holmes. Featuring Peter Cook, Dorris Henderson, The Three Bells, Alexis Korner's Blues Inc, John Renbourne and the Beat Girls. This week's guest artists: Davy Jones and The Four Tops.
18	"Gadzooks! It's The In-Crowd"	Barry Langford	31 May 1965
Starring Alan David & Lulu. Featuring the Beat Girls, Peter Cook, the Three Bells, John Renbourn and introducing the Cuddle Pups. With resident band The Luvvers Plus Five co-starring Marianne Faithfull. This week’s guest artist: Ray Singer.
19	"Gadzooks! It's The In-Crowd"	Barry Langford	7 June 1965
Starring Alan David & Lulu. Featuring the Beat Girls, Peter Cook, the Three Bells, John Renbourn and introducing the Cuddle Pups. With resident band The Luvvers Plus Five co-starring Marianne Faithfull. This week’s guest artists: Gene Pitney, the Who and Dana Gillespie.
20	"Gadzooks! It's The In-Crowd"	Michael Hurll	14 June 1965
Starring Alan David & Lulu. Co-starring Marianne Faithfull. Featuring the Beat Girls with Peter Cook, the Three Bells and The Luvvers Plus Five . This week’s guest star: Solomon Burke.
21	"Gadzooks! It's The In-Crowd"	Terence Hughes	21 June 1965
Starring Alan David & Lulu. Co-starring Marianne Faithfull. Featuring the Beat Girls with Peter Cook, the Three Bells, The Luvvers Plus Five and Ray Singer.
22	"Gadzooks! It's The In-Crowd"	Terence Hughes	28 June 1965
Starring Alan David & Lulu. Co-starring Marianne Faithfull. Featuring the Beat Girls with Peter Cook, the Three Bells, The Luvvers Plus Five and this week’s guest stars: Peter and Gordon.
23	"Gadzooks! It's The In-Crowd"	Terence Hughes	5 July 1965
Starring Alan David & Lulu. Co-starring Marianne Faithfull. Featuring the Beat Girls with Peter Cook, the Three Bells, The Luvvers Plus Five .
24	"Gadzooks!"	Terence Hughes	12 July 1965
Lulu with the Three Bells, Dane Hunter and the Beat Girls. Guest stars: Tom Jones, Vikki Carr and Tony Jackson & the Vibrations.
25	"Gadzooks!"	Terence Hughes	19 July 1965
Lulu with the Three Bells and the Beat Girls. Guest stars: the Animals and Inez and Charlie Foxx.
26	"Gadzooks!"	Terence Hughes	26 July 1965
Lulu with the Three Bells and the Beat Girls. Guest stars: the Ivy League and the Fortunes.
27	"Gadzooks!"	Terence Hughes	2 August 1965
Featuring The Three Bells and the Beat Girls. Guest stars: Brian Poole and the Tremeloes and Carolyn Hester.
28	"Gadzooks!"	Nick Burrell-Davis	9 August 1965
Featuring The Three Bells and the Beat Girls. Guest stars: Friday Brown, Roger Whittaker, The Byrds and Sonny and Cher.
29	"Gadzooks!"	Nick Burrell-Davis	16 August 1965
Featuring The Three Bells, the Beat Girls, Roger Whittaker and guest artists.
30	"Gadzooks!"	Nick Burrell-Davis	23 August 1965
Featuring The Three Bells, the Beat Girls, Roger Whittaker and guest artists.
31	"Gadzooks!"	Nick Burrell-Davis	30 August 1965
Featuring The Three Bells, the Beat Girls, Roger Whittaker and guest artists.
32	"Gadzooks!"	Nick Burrell-Davis	6 September 1965
Featuring The Three Bells, the Beat Girls, Roger Whittaker and guest artists.
33	"Gadzooks!"	Nick Burrell-Davis	13 September 1965
Featuring The Three Bells, the Beat Girls, Roger Whittaker and guest artists.
34	"Gadzooks!"	Nick Burrell-Davis	20 September 1965
Featuring The Three Bells, the Beat Girls, Roger Whittaker and guest artists.
35	"Gadzooks!"	Nick Burrell-Davis	27 September 1965
Featuring The Three Bells, the Beat Girls, Roger Whittaker and guest artists.
