= Kingdom Records =

British record label

- Genre: dub, reggae
- Country of origin: United Kingdom
- Location: London

Kingdom Records is a British record label from the 1970s and 1980s, that was important in early British and Jamaican dub music. The label was founded by founded by Terry King. One of Kingdom Records' first releases was the 1972 Mojo Hannah single "Six Days on the Road".

Kingdom Jazz is a sub-label of Kingdom Records. Kingdom Jazz uses the catalogue prefix GATE, for example: GATE 7003.

== Artists ==
Artists who have recorded with Kingdom Records or Kingdom Jazz include: (Note: Entries marked with a J recorded with Kingdom Jazz)

- Ahmad Jamal^{J}
- Angel Witch
- Art Blakey^{J}
- B. B. King
- B. B. King^{J}
- Barrington Levy
- Buddy Rich^{J}
- Caravan
- Carmen McRae^{J}
- Charlie Mingus^{J}
- Chick Corea^{J}
- Culture
- Don Carlos and Gold
- Eddie "Lockjaw" Davis^{J}
- Gary Burton^{J}
- Gayle Moran^{J}
- Gerry Mulligan^{J}
- Gregory Isaacs
- Joe Farrell^{J}
- Johnny Griffin^{J}
- Lionel Hampton^{J}
- McCoy Tyner^{J}
- Mike Garson^{J}
- Mojo Hannah
- Nicholas Greenwood
- Pat Metheny^{J}
- Paul Horn^{J}
- Pulsar
- Revelation
- Scientist
- Simple Simon
- Sonny Stitt^{J}
- Stan Getz^{J}
- Sugar Blue^{J}
- The Dave Brubeck Quartet^{J}
- The Heath Brothers^{J}
- The Royals
- Wayne Gibson
- Woody Shaw^{J}
- Wynton Marsalis^{J}
