= Mods and Rockers (film) =

- Directed by: Kenneth Hume
- Based on: ballet Mods and Rockers
- Distributed by: Anglo-Amalgamated
- Release date: December 1964
- Running time: 27 mins
- Country: United Kingdom
- Language: English

Mods and Rockers is a 1964 British short film directed by Kenneth Hume and produced by Anglo-Amalgamated. It features the Western Theatre Ballet company based on their ballets "Mods and Rockers" and "Non-Stop". They also perform a dance to Beatles compositions. The songs were performed by The Cheynes who included Mick Fleetwood.

The film was first released in theatres in December 1964.

== Production ==
Rehearsals began on 13 July 1964 and filming began the following week at Twickenham Film Studios.

== US Release ==
The film was released in US cinemas with two other films, Swinging UK and UK Swings Again, and titled Go-Go Big Beat. This was despite Hume's legal attempt to prevent the film being released in this way.

== Reception ==
The Monthly Film Bulletin wrote: "Whether the film hopes to win over the average teenager to modern ballet is uncertain, although one cannot fancy its chances despite the prevailing din towards the end. Otherwise it is not easy to discern its aim beyond obviously appealing to the somewhat limited public for modern ballet. Any other audience is likely to find it a tedious twenty-five minutes."

Variety wrote: "Mods And Rockers is supposedly a ballet to music by three composing members of the Beatles (group's only connection with film) but Peter Darrell's choreography Is rarely ballet. His movements are extreme variations on dances popular today with teenagers. Company is divided between the black leather jacketed motorcycling Rockers and the Mods, whose trademark is their stylized Edwardian dress. A weak carbon of West Side Story rumble, dance has two groups brought together by a dogooder vicar whose efforts to "reach" them includes wearing a leather jacket over his clericals and not interfering when the fighting starts. If there's any serious social comment, it is that British youth is rapidly becoming demasculinized because of addiction to extreme tastes in music, dress and deportment."

The Guardian said "The dancing is worth watching."

The film was released in Australia on a double bill with Gonks Go Beat (1964). The Age called it "excitingly executed".
