= Ruby Flipper =

1970s British dance troupe

Ruby Flipper were a multiracial, mixed-sex dance troupe who performed dance routines to songs in the UK Singles Chart on the BBC colour television series Top of the Pops in 1976.

== Members ==
The original Ruby Flipper line-up consisted of four female dancers and three male dancers:

- Lulu Cartwright
- Cherry Gillespie
- Phillip Haigh (sometimes credited as Phillip Steggles)
- Patti Hammond
- Sue Menhenick
- Floyd Pearce
- Gavin Trace

The troupe made their TOTP debut on 6 May 1976, performing a dance routine to The Stylistics' version of "Can't Help Falling In Love".

== Origins ==
As a replacement for Pan's People, choreographer Flick Colby decided to put together a new troupe which would feature both male and female dancers. In a BBC interview, co-manager Ruth Pearson added, "Pan's People had been around for about eight years and it felt like it was time for a concept change."

Auditions for the troupe took place at the Dance Centre in London's Covent Garden following press advertisements. The final line-up was chosen in March 1976, whereupon the dancers began a period of rehearsal before their first appearance on Top of the Pops.

Colby and Pearson chose the name "Ruby Flipper" for the new team, supposedly as a combination of their personal names (RUBY FLIPPER = RUth PEaRson + FLIck colBY +P). Former Pan's People members Cherry Gillespie and Sue Menhenick were invited to join the new TOTP dance troupe.

== Demise ==
However, the troupe were not retained as the resident dancers on Top of the Pops for long. Haigh recalled, "They didn't really give a clear reason why, but they just said that it had been decided that 'Ruby Flipper will be coming to an end and that they'd be looking for a new group'."

According to Colby, Bill Cotton advised her and Pearson to disband Ruby Flipper in favour of a new all-girl company: "...He said he didn't like the concept and that he wanted a girl group back on the show. I was told to reform an all-girl group - or quit."

Changes to the line-up of Ruby Flipper occurred during their time on Top of the Pops. Trace last appeared as part of the line-up on 15 July 1976; his final routine being Tavares' "Heaven Must Be Missing an Angel". Gillespie also left the troupe in September 1976; her last performance was The Ritchie Family's "The Best Disco in Town" on 30 September 1976.

By the autumn of 1976, Colby and Pearson decided to disband Ruby Flipper and return to the all-female dance troupe formula of Pan's People with a new sextet, Legs & Co. Ruby Flipper made their final Top of the Pops appearance on 14 October 1976 as a quintet, with a routine to Wild Cherry's "Play That Funky Music".

== Life after TOTP ==
The two male dancers in the final line-up, Haigh and Pearce, continued their dancing careers.

Pearce was invited back to dance on TOTP for at least nine routines with Legs & Co. in the next two years, in routines to:

- Stevie Wonder's "I Wish" on 23 December 1976
- Andrew Gold's "Lonely Boy" on 14 April 1977
- Bo Kirkland and Ruth Davis' "You're Gonna Get Next To Me" on 16 June 1977
- Donna Summer's "I Feel Love" on 11 August 1977,
- Stevie Wonder's "Sir Duke" on 25 December 1977
- John Travolta and Olivia Newton-John's "You're the One That I Want" on 25 May 1978
- The Real Thing's "Let's Go Disco" also on 25 May 1978
- Sylvester's "(You Make Me Feel) Mighty Real" on 21 September 1978
- John Travolta and Olivia Newton-John's "Summer Nights" on 25 December 1978.

Pearce also appeared along with Legs and Co for two dance numbers dancing to The Real Thing's "Let's Go Disco" and Odyssey's "Native New Yorker" in the film The Stud in 1978, as well as dancing with Legs and Co to The Bee Gees' "Night Fever" on Larry Grayson's Generation Game and as a dancer in the Dougie Squires troupe that backed the singer Lulu in her segments of The Les Dawson Show that same year. He joined the dance troupe Hot Gossip and from July 1978 could be seen in their routines that featured on Kenny Everett's shows (in series one, three and four on ITV and series 6 on the BBC). He stayed with Hot Gossip until they disbanded at the end of 1986, occasionally singing lead vocals to songs in stage shows and videos, as well as dancing. In 1980 he danced with Hot Gossip in the Village People's film Can't Stop the Music, and later had a small part dancing in the Monty Python film The Meaning of Life. He also sang with a variety of celebrities and minor celebrities on the charity single "Doctor in Distress" in 1985, a song which campaigned to have the Doctor Who series returned to television, as it was on hiatus at that point.

Until 1981 and the introduction of Zoo, the resident TOTP dance troupe would remain exclusively female. The three remaining female dancers, Cartwright, Hammond and Menhenick, became part of the line-up of Legs & Co., who made their debut the week after Ruby Flipper's last performance and remained as part of the resident TOTP dance troupe until October 1981.

Patti Hammond died following a long illness on 15 September 2021, at the age of 71.

== Bibliography ==
Simpson, J., (2002), Top of the Pops: 1964-2002, London, BBC Worldwide
