= Pan's People =

British female TV dance troupe (1968–1976)

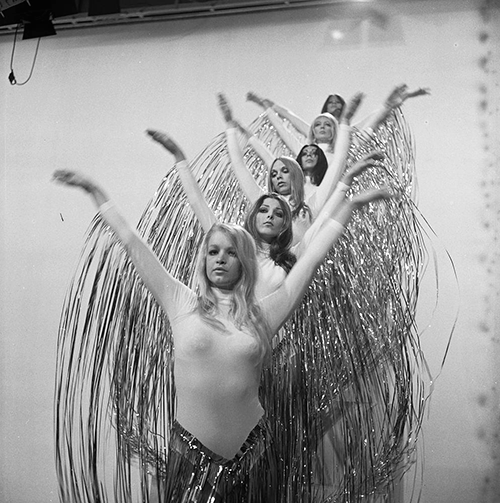
Pan's People on TopPop (1971), showing the original Top of the Pops line-up; from front Babs Lord, Louise Clarke, Flick Colby, Ruth Pearson, Andi Rutherford, Dee Dee Wilde

Pan's People were a British all-female dance troupe most commonly associated with the BBC TV music chart show Top of the Pops, from 1968 to 1976. The group, founded and led by choreographer Felicity "Flick" Colby in December 1966, accompanied top 20 hits on the weekly show for eight years, when artists were unable or unwilling to perform live. Pan's People appeared on many other TV shows in the UK and elsewhere in Europe, and also performed in nightclub cabaret.

Pan's People succeeded the Go-Jos in May/June 1968 as the second dance troupe to make monthly appearances on Top of the Pops, when the series aired in black-and-white. They became a weekly feature of the programme following its revamp and time extension in January 1970 and continued for the next six years, giving their last performance in April 1976 when they were replaced by the short-lived Ruby Flipper, also choreographed by Colby. As a result of line-up changes, only one dancer, Ruth Pearson, appeared on the whole run.

Owing to their weekly exposure on British television, the group acquired a high profile. In addition, as a result of the increasing number of recordings from 1973 onwards known to have been preserved, the 'classic' line-up that existed from 1972 to 1974 is still visible today. The dancers in this line-up were:

Felicity "Flick" Colby (23 March 1946 – 26 May 2011) – member 1966–1976, of which dancer 1966–1972
Babs Lord (born 1945) – member 1966–1975
Dee Dee Wilde (born 1946) – member 1966–1975
Ruth Pearson (13 July 1946 – 27 June 2017) – member 1967–1976 and choreographer on some shows 1967–1970
Louise Clarke (3 September 1949 – 25 August 2012) – member 1967–1974
Cherry Gillespie (born 1955) – member 1972–1976

Colby was the principal choreographer of Pan's People throughout their existence.

== Formation and early history ==
=== Formation from Beat Girls ===
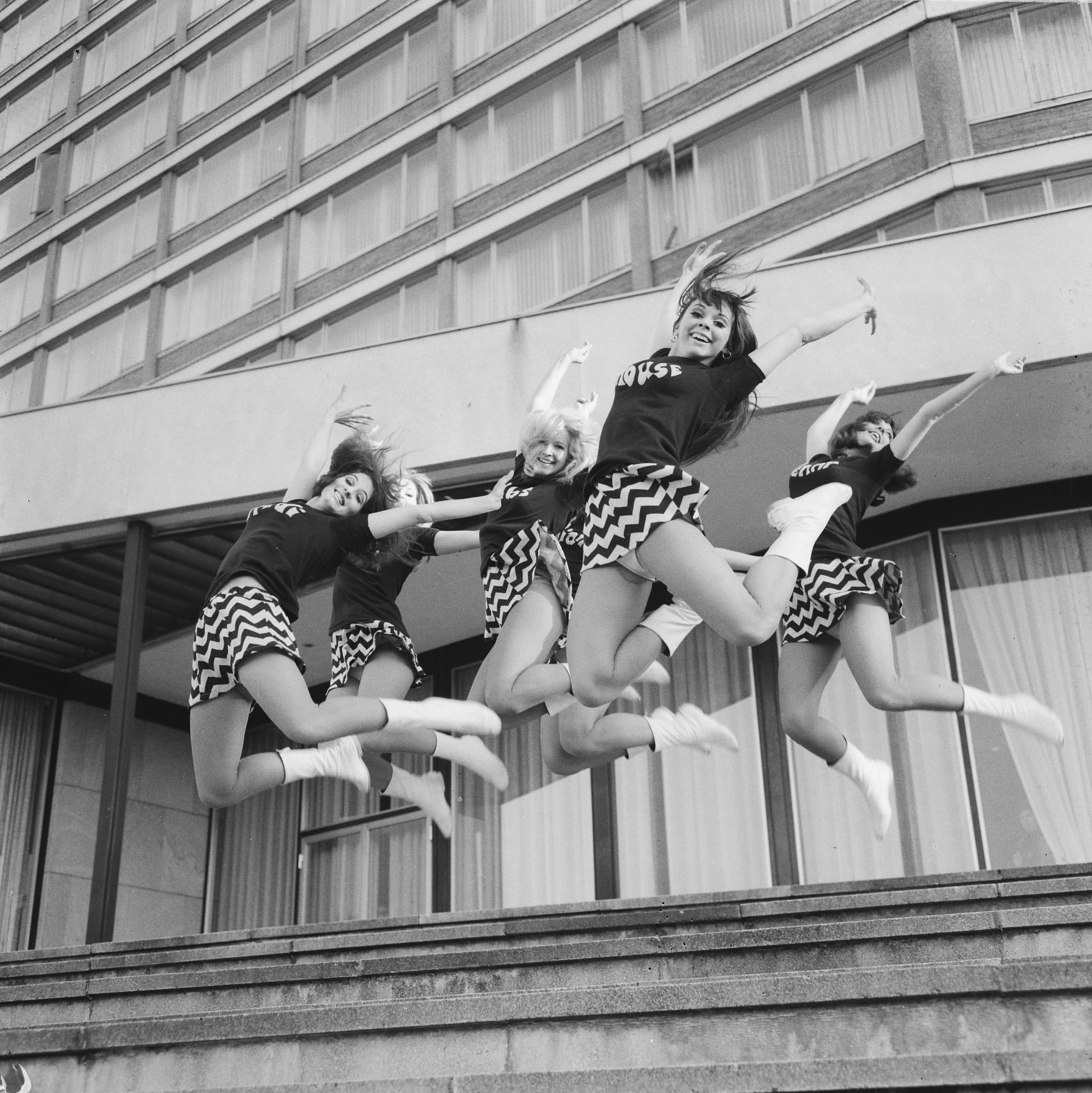
September 1966: Beat Girls picture showing original Pan's People dancers; from left, Dee Dee Wilde, Lorelly Harris, Babs Lord, Flick Colby and Penny Fergusson. Dancer and choreographer Diane South, who was never in Pan's People, is almost completely obscured at the back.

The origins of Pan's People lie in the Dance Centre-based Katy-Dids, a six-"girl" jazz dance group formed in May 1964 comprising Linda Bywaters, Linda Lawrence, Jenny Ferle, Lyn Wolseley, Diane South and Ann Chapman. This group, renamed the Beat Girls following the commencement of their residence on The Beat Room in July 1964, subsequently appeared on many music and light entertainment TV programmes in the UK and the Netherlands.

Following numerous line-up changes, by December 1966 only two members were left who had appeared in The Beat Room, which ended in January 1965:

- Barbara (Babs) Lord, who appeared from September 1964
- Diane South – despite having appeared in the Katy-Dids and Beat Girls since 1964, she was never a regular, for she frequently stood in as choreographer when their choreographer/manager, Gary Cockrell, was unavailable.

The other members at this time were:

- Felicity (Flick) Colby (1946–2011) – recruited in January 1966, though she already had a Dutch TV special (featuring the Beat Girls) built around her
- Patricia (Dee Dee) Wilde – joined in March 1966; she had attended the Elmhurst School for Dance in Surrey
- Lorelly Harris – joined around May 1966
- Penelope (Penny) Fergusson – joined around May 1966; a former member of the Royal Ballet School.

Following an Equity-backed dispute with their management over pay rates for Dutch shows, three members, Colby, Lord and Wilde, walked out and formed a new group on 8 December 1966 in London. After considering other names, including Dionysus's Darlings they agreed on the name Pan's People, named after the Greek god Pan as the "god of dance, music and debauchery". By 18 December, they were joined by two of the remaining three Beat Girls, Harris and Fergusson. This marked the end of the Beat Girls as a regular act on British television; however, with new recruits joining Diane South, that group continued their Dutch engagements from January 1967, finally ceasing to perform in May 1968.

By Christmas 1966 Pan's People recruited Felicity Balfour (sometimes called Felicity Balfour Smith), who had briefly been in the Beat Girls, and had been a schoolfriend of Dee Dee Wilde. Thus they formed a sextet, with Colby also acting as choreographer.

Press accounts during the lifetime of the group omit the Beat Girls involvement from Pan's People's history; however, modern-day recollections include this time though sometimes incorrectly as a continuation of the previous group.

=== Early work and line-up changes ===
Their first TV appearance was in the Belgian TV programme Vibrato in January 1967, with the initial line-up.

In February/March 1967, Felicity Balfour's contract was terminated, due to her being unsettled in the group. After Pan's People, amongst other subsequent activities she performed with the Denise Shaune dancers, and worked in musical theatre, notably forming part of the original London cast of Joseph and the Amazing Technicolor Dreamcoat.

Following an audition, Balfour was replaced by Ruth Pearson (1946–2017). Like Lord, Pearson was an original Beat Girls member, performing in the group until early 1966, then in a prior Beat Girls breakaway group, Tomorrow's People.

Pearson also did some of the group choreography over the first two years in the group.

The new line-up with Pearson appeared on The Dickie Valentine Show in September and October 1967, replacing the Beat Girls from the 1966 series. All the Pan's People in this line-up, except for Pearson, had appeared in the earlier series.

The group were to appear in a ballet performed with the Yardbirds in December 1967, but it was cancelled shortly before it was to be performed.

Also in December 1967, Penny Fergusson left to do other work, and was replaced by Louise Clarke (1949–2012). In February 1968 three of Pan's People (Lord, Colby and Wilde) appeared on the West German show Beat Beat Beat with Tom Jones. This series was unique in that Ruth Pearson got sole choreography credit.

In the final change before the Top of the Pops era, Lorelly Harris chose to leave in March 1968, ultimately going into the Bluebell Girls. She was replaced by Andrea (Andi) Rutherford (1947–2015).

=== Early management ===
Colby's future husband, James Ramble, was manager, initially in partnership with promoter Rik Gunnell, but solo by the time of his marriage to Colby in 1967. He retained this role into 1970, the year of his divorce from Colby. In 1970 he claimed to have created two rules; one that the dancers must wear their hair down, and another that they must get married rather than have partners; however, the second rule was also reported later the same year as saying that marriage was not allowed until the end of 1971.

Following the end of his management, the troupe members managed themselves; later accounts of the history of Pan's People focus on this second structural phase.

== Early Top of the Pops (April 1968 to early 1972) and the 'Original' line-up ==
=== Top of the Pops before Pan's People ===
Top of the Pops began on 1 January 1964 as a weekly programme playing a selection of records from the current charts. From November 1964, Top of the Pops had an all-female dance troupe regularly appearing, the Go-Jos, formed and choreographed by another ex-Beat Girl, Jo Cook. Through to the beginning of 1968, professional dancing had been restricted to approximately monthly appearances by this group, performing to one track on the show typically where the artist couldn't attend.

This situation began to change in January 1968: whilst still in the Beat Girls, Diane South appeared solo on the show, dancing to the song "Judy in Disguise (With Glasses)".

On several occasions Pan's People presented brochures to the BBC with a view to appearing on Top of the Pops, the last being in March 1968, but up to this point they had not been employed on any BBC programme.

=== Early appearances by Pan's People members ===
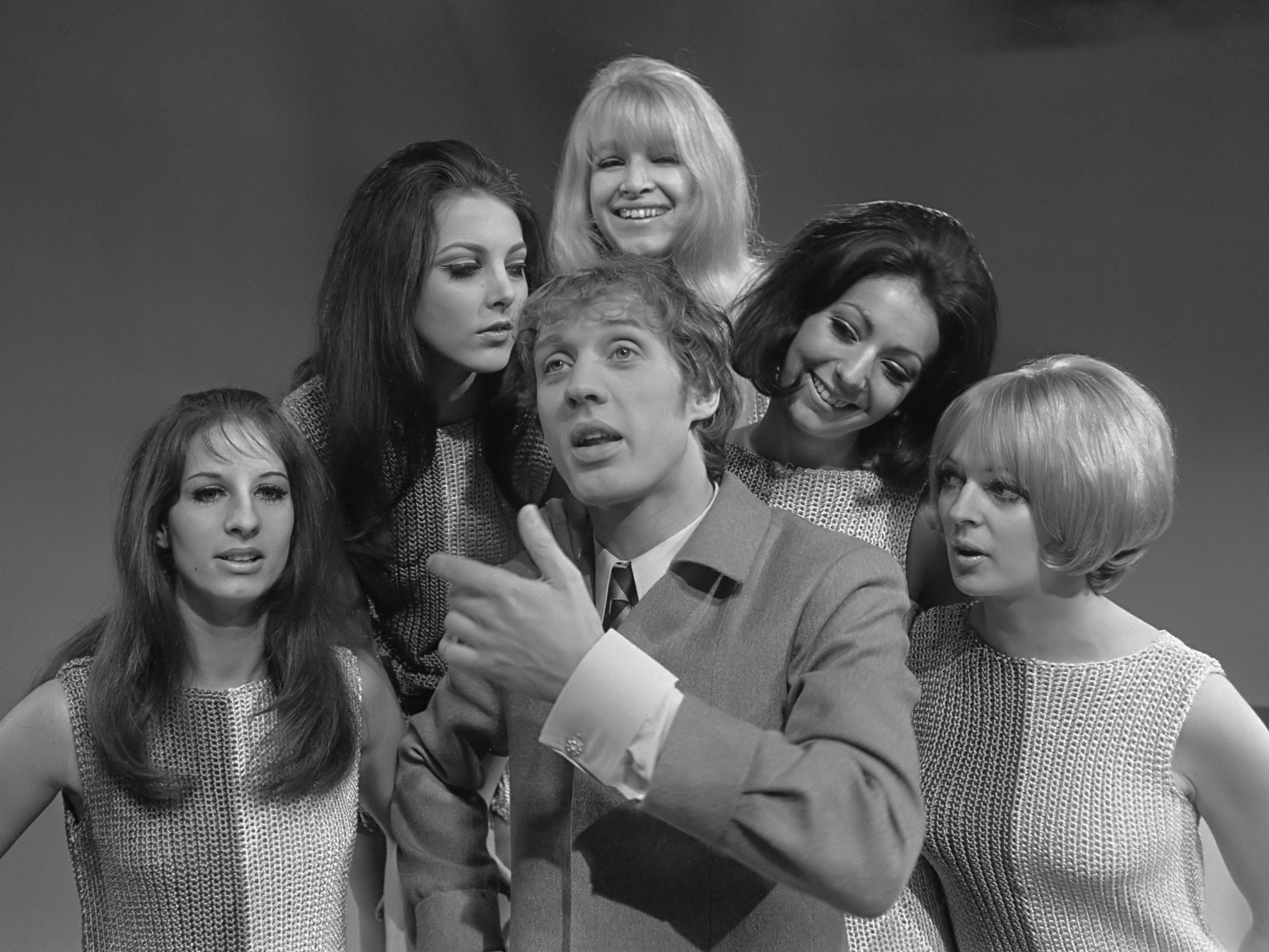
1968: Pan's People (from left, Dee Dee Wilde, Louise Clarke, Babs Lord, Ruth Pearson and Andi Rutherford) accompanying Herman van Veen

In late March 1968, the producers held an open audition for dancers on Top of the Pops to appear on 4 April 1968 to a routine to "Simon Says" by the 1910 Fruitgum Company. Four dancers were engaged, Dee Dee Wilde and Ruth Pearson from Pan's People (who along with the four other Pan's People had auditioned individually rather than as part of a group), and Janice (Janie) Kells and Jackie Dalton (both later in the Young Generation). An established choreographer, Virginia Mason, arranged the dancing. However, a BBC database recording band appearances only indicates 'disc' for this performance, omitting mention of dancers, so there is no direct evidence this performance was ever broadcast.

Following the performance, the two Pan's People participants spoke to the producer of the show, Colin Charman, and persuaded him to hire Pan's People as a group. This led a further routine with three members of Pan's People (Wilde, Pearson and Colby) with no extra dancers, and choreographed by Colby. The exact date and performance varies in different sources, alternatively:

- "Cry Like a Baby" by The Box Tops – the BBC archive indicates this track was only featured on the show on 18 April.
- "Young Girl" by Gary Puckett and the Union Gap – the BBC archive indicates this track was featured on the show on 2, 16 and 23 May, with later showings after known Pan's People performances.

The two early performances are sometimes stated in contemporary sources as Go-Jo performances, but the Go-Jos were not involved.

Subsequently, the entire Pan's People sextet appeared in a routine set to "US Male" by Elvis Presley on 30 May 1968.

The final performance of the Go-Jos was either to the 1910 Fruitgum Company, whose track was on Top of the Pops on 4 and 25 April 1968 or the Rolling Stones, transmitted on 20 June 1968. By either scenario, Pan's People were left as the sole dance troupe by July 1968.

Following the changes in the line-up during their first year, Pan's People by the time of their first appearance on Top of the Pops were:

- Louise Clarke
- Flick Colby (dancer and choreographer)
- Babs Lord
- Ruth Pearson
- Andi Rutherford
- Dee Dee Wilde

This is often called the 'Original' line-up, though several dancers had joined the troupe subsequent to its formation.

In summary:

Date	Track/Performer	Dancers	Choreographer	BBC Archive	Notes
4 April	Simon Says/1910 Fruitgum Company	Dee Dee Wilde, Ruth Pearson, Janice Kells, Jackie Dalton	Virginia Mason	Disc	1st performance including Pan's People members
18 April	Cry Like a Baby/The Box Tops	Dee Dee Wilde, Ruth Pearson, Flick Colby	Flick Colby	Disc/Dancers	2nd performance candidate including Pan's People members
25 April	Simon Says/1910 Fruitgum Company	GoJos	Jo Cook	Disc	Final performance candidate for GoJos
2 May	Young Girl/Gary Puckett and the Union Gap	Dee Dee Wilde, Ruth Pearson, Flick Colby	Flick Colby	Promo	2nd performance candidate including Pan's People members
16 May	Young Girl/Gary Puckett and the Union Gap	Dee Dee Wilde, Ruth Pearson, Flick Colby	Flick Colby	Promo	2nd performance candidate including Pan's People members
23 May	Young Girl/Gary Puckett and the Union Gap	Dee Dee Wilde, Ruth Pearson, Flick Colby	Flick Colby	Promo	2nd performance candidate including Pan's People members
30 May	US Male/Elvis Presley	Dee Dee Wilde, Ruth Pearson, Flick Colby, Andi Rutherford, Louise Clarke, Babs Lord	Flick Colby	Disc/Pan's People	3rd performance - all Pan's People members
20 June	Jumping Jack Flash/Rolling Stones	GoJos	Jo Cook	Disc/Dancers	Final performance candidate for GoJos

'Disc' indicates the track is played with the accompanying footage either of the audience or dancers.

'Promo' indicates a video is played.

=== Late 1960s and early 1970s ===
Penny Fergusson briefly rejoined the group for the Frankie Howerd show (broadcast August to September 1969) when Ruth Pearson worked as a choreographer on the Decidedly Dusty TV show (broadcast September to October 1969). In both 1968 and 1969, Pearson was co-credited with Colby for choreography on some shows.

Two male dancers, Adrian Le Peltier and Gary Downie, also occasionally accompanied the group between 1968 and 1970, in Happening for Lulu, the Bobbie Gentry Show and Top of the Pops.

The group also did shows, their manager said in June 1969, "So far this year they have had 24 free days...to compensate it would be a bad week if the girls didn't pick up at least £90 each". From November 1969, Top of the Pops began broadcasting in colour. Each week, from 22 January 1970 up until September 1970, the group performed a short routine during the opening credits. New titles were produced using Andi Rutherford as a dancer, that debuted on 1 October 1970, however, this was only used for 5 editions before finally being replaced in early November by the CCS cover version of "Whole Lotta Love".

The earliest known footage of Pan's People on Top of the Pops is rehearsal footage for the 1 January 1970 edition.

From 22 January 1970 the programme was extended from 25 to 45 minutes; the group appeared weekly from this point on. Also from this date, Colby as choreographer and the group began to be listed in the end credits of the programme and in Radio Times.

Colby chose to concentrate full-time on choreographing the group's routines, making her last performance as a dancer in February 1972. She was not replaced, so the number of dancers decreased to five.

== Later Top of the Pops (1972 to March 1976) ==
=== Middle years and the 'classic' line-up ===
Andi Rutherford married in December 1971; in September 1972 she ceased dancing due to pregnancy, managing the group till March 1973. She then left on maternity leave though she never returned, eventually forming her own troupe, Sister-matic, in 1976. She was replaced as a dancer in December 1972 by Cherry Gillespie, initially appearing in the show in gift-wrapping. Flick Colby noted that the decision to cast a new group member, and the actual decision to cast Gillespie, was a democratic one taken entirely by members of Pan's People. Outside clients, such as the producers of Top of the Pops, were not part of the process.

By this time the line-up was:

- Louise Clarke
- Babs Lord
- Ruth Pearson
- Dee Dee Wilde
- Cherry Gillespie

On 16 May 1974 Clarke made her last performance, dancing to R Dean Taylor's "There's a Ghost In My House", leaving Pan's People to start a family; Sue Menhenick was selected to succeed her, and made her first appearance on 6 June 1974, dancing to "Summer Breeze" by the Isley Brothers.

=== Dancing on Top of the Pops ===
The dancers rehearsed three days a week for the show. Rehearsals began on the Monday morning prior to that week's show, with Colby scripting a routine, and a costume fitting later the same day. Rehearsals ended with a run-through a few hours before the show on the Wednesday.

However, due to Top of the Pops being a chart show, problems could arise. Pearson recalled: "We can often spend three or four days rehearsing an intricate dance routine to a certain record. Then, on the Tuesday, when the new pop charts come out, we learn that the record we're planning for the show has actually gone down in the charts, instead of up . . . so it's out. Dropped. We then have to do a completely different record number, and go on the programme with maybe only one day's rehearsal on it. This really isn't fair on us, because we are judged on our performance on screen. I'm sure viewers do not know that we've had to change the number, sometimes only a day before we do the show".

=== Late Pan's People ===
In August 1974 the group released a double A-side record, "You Can Really Rock And Roll Me"/"The Singer Not The Song" on the Epic label with Cherry Gillespie on lead vocal. However, it did not chart. A second single, "He's Got Magic", followed in 1975 but was again unsuccessful.

In March 1975, Carolyne Argyle joined the group. However, she left the group that June without ever performing, because she was viewed as struggling to learn the routines in the timescales needed for the show. Although she stated an intention to continue dancing, she ultimately had an acting career.

In September 1975 Lord left (after marrying Robert Powell on 29 August), and two members joined the troupe, Mary Corpe and Lee Ward. These were the last permanent additions to the group, and briefly brought its line-up back to six members for the first time since 1972.

After planning to quit earlier in the year to coincide with her planned marriage and the unsuccessful membership of Carolyne Argyle, Dee Dee finally quit in October 1975.

Blue Peter presenter Lesley Judd became a temporary member of the group for a one-off routine, dancing to "Rodrigo's Guitar Concerto De Aranjuez" by Manuel and the Music of the Mountains, transmitted on Top of the Pops on 12 February 1976. Rehearsals and behind-the-scenes footage of the routine were featured on Blue Peter. Judd had been a dancer in the late 1960s and, as an occasional member, had appeared alongside Flick Colby, Babs Lord and Dee Dee Wilde in the Beat Girls 10 years earlier on the Dickie Valentine Show and in the Pathé film Jetaway Getaway. She had also briefly been in the Go-Jos and Young Generation so was in four prominent 1960s dance groups.

== The end of Pan's People (March/April 1976) ==
In early 1976, the last remaining original Top of the Pops dancer, Ruth Pearson, now approaching 30, was looking to retire. At the same time Flick Colby and Top of the Pops production staff had become keen to develop a new group for the show, with both male and female dancers, and also moving away from having all dancers wearing the same costumes and performing the same moves. Ruth recalled: "Flick and I made the decision. The writing was on the wall when Dee and Babs left. I think our time had passed". Senior BBC management did not have full knowledge of the intention to adopt a new group format, and later expressed disapproval of this change.

By March 1976, the replacement group for Pan's People, Ruby Flipper, had been selected and began rehearsing; just two of the existing Pan's People, Sue Menhenick and Cherry Gillespie, were retained as dancers, with Ruth Pearson retiring. There was to be no role in the new group for the remaining two dancers, Mary Corpe and Lee Ward, but they continued to appear in Pan's People while the Ruby Flipper rehearsals began.

However, following the Pan's People performance transmitted on 1 April 1976, Lee Ward left the group. She was reported as saying, with regard to the change to a mixed-gender group, "It's a big mistake. Men rush home to watch sexy ladies. They do not want to see other men." Following this, Ward ended her career as a dancer.

The line-up for the final performances in April 1976 was, therefore:

- Mary Corpe
- Cherry Gillespie
- Sue Menhenick
- Ruth Pearson

The final performance on Top of the Pops was on 29 April 1976, dancing to "Silver Star" by the Four Seasons. The end of Pan's People's tenure went unmentioned on the show, though it marked the end both of Pearson's eight years on the show as a dancer, and Corpe's seven-month run. Corpe initially joined Nigel Lythgoe's Young Generation, but returned to Top of the Pops for two performances in Zoo in 1982.

The following week, the mixed-gender seven-member Ruby Flipper made their first appearance on the show with Colby as choreographer, Pearson as manager, and Menhenick and Gillespie starting the performance on their own, then joined by the five new dancers.

== Participant timeline ==
Most dates pre-1972 are approximate. The Top of the Pops era is denoted by the two red lines. Narrow width lines denote members not appearing on Top of the Pops. The dates of Adrian LePeltier and Gary Downie performing on Top of the Pops are not known.

== Lineups ==
Jan–Mar 1967 First line-up - Vibrato	Apr–Dec 1967 Dickie Valentine show	Dec 1967–Mar 1968 Penny Fergusson quits as full-time member	Mar 1968–Feb 1972 Top of the Pops 'Original' line-up
Flick Colby; Babs Lord; Dee Dee Wilde; Penny Fergusson; Lorelly Harris; Felicity Balfour	Flick Colby; Babs Lord; Dee Dee Wilde; Penny Fergusson; Lorelly Harris; Ruth Pearson	Flick Colby; Babs Lord; Dee Dee Wilde; Louise Clarke; Lorelly Harris; Ruth Pearson	Flick Colby; Babs Lord; Dee Dee Wilde; Louise Clarke; Andi Rutherford; Ruth Pearson
Sep–Oct 1969 Ruth on leave Frankie Howerd show with Penny Fergusson	Feb – Sep 1972 Flick quits dancing	Sep – Dec 1972 Perform as four-piece after Andi leaves	Dec 1972 – May 1974 Cherry Gillespie joins, the 'Classic' line-up
Flick Colby; Babs Lord; Dee Dee Wilde; Louise Clarke; Andi Rutherford; Penny Fergusson	Babs Lord; Dee Dee Wilde; Louise Clarke; Andi Rutherford; Ruth Pearson	Babs Lord; Dee Dee Wilde; Louise Clarke; Ruth Pearson	Babs Lord; Dee Dee Wilde; Louise Clarke; Cherry Gillespie; Ruth Pearson
May 1974 – Sep 1975 Sue Menhenick replaces Louise Clarke	Sep – Oct 1975 Babs retires Lee & Mary join	Oct 1975 – Apr 1976 Dee Dee retires	Apr 1976 Final lineup after Lee Ward quits
Babs Lord; Dee Dee Wilde; Sue Menhenick; Cherry Gillespie; Ruth Pearson	Dee Dee Wilde; Sue Menhenick; Cherry Gillespie; Ruth Pearson; Mary Corpe; Lee Ward	Sue Menhenick; Cherry Gillespie; Ruth Pearson; Mary Corpe; Lee Ward	Sue Menhenick; Cherry Gillespie; Ruth Pearson; Mary Corpe

== Television work outside TOTP ==
Among other television series Pan's People appeared on were:

Year	Months	Show	Channel	Notes
1967	January–March	Vibrato	RTB (Belgium)	Only known show with Felicity Balfour
1967	September–October	The Dickie Valentine Show	ATV	No footage survives; Colby, Lord, Wilde, Harris and Fergusson had appeared on previous series as Beat Girls
1967		Hits a go-go (special)	SBC (Switzerland)	
1967		Carousel d'ete	RTB/BRT (Belgium), KRO (Netherlands), Czech TV	
1968		Vibrato	RTB (Belgium)	Pearson co-choreographs
1968		Beat Beat Beat	Hessischer Rundfunk (Germany)	Pearson choreographs; the only surviving footage shows Colby, Lord and Wilde dancing
1968		Golden Shot	ATV	Guest appearance
1968	July–August	The Bobbie Gentry Show	(BBC)	Second BBC show after Top of the Pops
1968	September	Top of the Night	RTE (Ireland)	
1968		Herman van Veen show	VARA (Netherlands)	
1968	October	Beat Club special	Bremen Radio/TV (Germany)	Performed "Over Under Sideways Down" by the Yardbirds
1968		Go Go gig	RTB/BRT (Belgium)	
1968/9	December–January	Happening for Lulu	BBC	No Pan's People footage survives, but show is notable for Jimi Hendrix performance on 4 January
1969	January–March	Lulu	BBC	Renamed continuation of Happening for Lulu; included A Song For Europe
1969		Vibrato	RTB (Belgium)	Pearson co-choreographs; Lord is assistant director and not a dancer
1969		Jean Ferrat special	VARA (Netherlands)	Pearson co-choreographs
1969	May–June	Des O'Connor on stage	ATV	
1969	June–August	The Bobbie Gentry Show	(BBC)	
1969	August–September	The Frankie Howerd Show	ATV	Notable for Penny Fergusson standing in for Ruth Pearson
1969	November–December	The Price of Fame	(BBC)	
1970	February	"Ein lied fur Amsterdam"	ARD Germany	Dancing to "Get Back" by the Beatles, and "The Clapping Song"
1970	June	The Price of Fame	(BBC)	
1970	December	Into 1971	BBC	New Year's Eve special
1971	August	Knokke 1971	BBC	Won both the first prize and the special iPress- Award in the Golden Seaswallow competition of live television held in Knokke, Belgium, in July 1971
1972	April	Nancy Wilson	BBC	Nancy Wilson in cabaret from The Talk of the Town, London
1972	May	Glenn Campbell	BBC	Glenn Campbell from The Talk of the Town, London
1972	August	Night Club	BBC	An international cabaret from The Talk of the Town, London
1973	February–March	Gentry	BBC	
1973	March	Frankie Howerd in Ulster	BBC	A concert recorded during Frankie Howerd's tour of military camps in Northern Ireland
1973	April–June	The John Denver Show	BBC	Series of six shows
1973/4	September–January	The Two Ronnies	BBC	
1974	January–February	The Jack Jones show	BBC	Series regulars
1974	June–July	The Two Ronnies	BBC	
1974	April	In Concert	(BBC)	Pan's People appeared in their own edition
1975	December	Morecambe and Wise Christmas show	(BBC)	They danced to Brenda Arnau's version of "Big Spender", with Morecambe & Wise posing as two new Pan's Persons

== Surviving Top of the Pops appearances ==
Pan's People performed at a time when the BBC routinely wiped the videos of the Top of the Pops shows to save money on new tapes and because it was not thought that anyone would want to watch the shows again. However, organisations such as the BFI and Kaleidoscope have spent time searching archives, and as a result many recorded dance routines have been rediscovered. More recently they have found roughly 40 lost dances on home video recordings, and have extracted digital footage from the very fragile analogue tapes. Estimated video survivals by year:

1968/69 – None
1970 – 14–18
1971 – 18
1972 – 8
1973 – 24
1974 – 23
1975 – 47
1976 – 17 (of 21)

== Life after TOTP ==
Even after their departure from Top of the Pops Pan's People were much in demand for personal appearances. Dee Dee Wilde continued to dance with and manage a new group of women under the name "New Pan's People": Pauline Crawford, Abigail Higgins, Patricia McSherry, Francesca Whitburn and Sarah Woollett. Also members for a short time during this period were the future Hot Gossip dancers Sarah Brightman and Carol Fletcher. In 1979, the troupe released another single, "Magic Man"/"Club Lido", in New Zealand on the RTC label. "Club Lido" was subsequently released in the UK on the GM label. It failed to chart, and was correctly predicted to be a 'miss' when it was reviewed by the panel on an edition of Juke Box Jury broadcast on 18 August 1979 on BBC1, when the group appeared as a surprise to the panel of Dave Bartram, Keith Chegwin, Dana and Bonnie Tyler.

Babs Lord married actor Robert Powell and became an amateur yachtswoman and world explorer, with several trips to the Himalayas, the Sahara, both Poles and the jungle in Guyana. By 2013 she had visited both the North and South Poles. Lord was the subject of BBC's This Is Your Life in November 2001. She appeared on the final regular weekly edition of Top of the Pops on 30 July 2006 – the only member of any of the show's dance troupes to appear in person at the recording.

Cherry Gillespie appeared with Roger Moore in Octopussy (1983), and was also in the TV series The Hot Shoe Show (1983–84); she sang on the album from the show. In 1997 she appeared as a panellist on Channel Five's nostalgia quiz show Wowfabgroovy.

Patricia 'Dee Dee' Wilde eventually married composer and musician Henry Marsh.

Mary Corpe moved to South Africa where she teaches dance to children.

Flick Colby died of bronchial pneumonia on 26 May 2011, as a result of cancer, at the age of 65.

Louise Clarke died of heart failure on 24 August 2012 at the age of 62.

In November 2013, Signum Books released the autobiography Pan's People: Our Story, written by Babs Powell, Ruth Pearson, Dee Dee Wilde, Cherry Gillespie and writer Simon Barnard.

In April 2014, Babs, Sue, Dee Dee and Ruth reunited to model clothes for isme.com.

Andi Rutherford died at the age of 68 on 3 December 2015, following a long illness.

Ruth Pearson died on 27 June 2017, following a battle with cancer, at the age of 70.
