= Zoo (dance troupe) =

1980s British dance troupe

Zoo were a dance troupe who appeared on the weekly British music series Top of the Pops between 1981 and 1983.

Like previous dance troupes Pan's People, Ruby Flipper and their immediate predecessors Legs & Co., Zoo were put together and choreographed by Flick Colby (whose credit on the TOTP end credit changed from "Choreographer" to "Dance Director" on Zoo's debut). However, unlike the previous troupes, Zoo were formed as a repertory dance group with an ever-changing line-up, featuring a mixture of male and female multi-racial dancers with backgrounds in classical dance, the circus and the disco dancing scene.

Zoo were credited as appearing 45 times on TOTP between 5 November 1981 and 29 September 1983, although members of the troupe still appeared on the show in this time and beyond their residence outside their capacity as members of Zoo.

Their first appearance on TOTP featured a routine to the Electric Light Orchestra's Twilight.

== Members ==
As they were styled as a repertory dance group, the line-up for Zoo varied in each of their Top of the Pops routines. While many dancers appeared regularly during the bulk of the troupe's run on the show, some dancers seemed to appear only once.

However, some continuity from the previous TOTP dance troupe Legs & Co. was maintained. Anita Mahadervan, who had been a member of Legs & Co. for their last six months on TOTP, appeared on most of Zoo's early dance routines. Another Legs & Co. dancer, Sue Menhenick, who had been part of the various TOTP dance troupes from 1974 to October 1981, was invited to return for one edition in December 1981 and was credited as a member of Zoo on the show's end titles. Mary Corpe, who was in the final line up of Pan's People, also made a few appearances.

The number of dancers involved in a Zoo routine varied from one (Sue Menhenick, who danced to Jon & Vangelis' "I'll Find My Way Home" on 17 December 1981, and Maureen (surname unknown), who danced to Derek and the Dominos' "Layla" on 18 March 1982) to twelve (for the 1981 and 1982 two-part Christmas specials, and the 2 September 1982 edition).

Former World and UK disco dancing and freestyle champions Julie Brown and Clive Clarke auditioned and danced to Lets Groove Tonight by Earth, Wind and Fire, as the first members of the Zoo Experience in the autumn of 1981. Richard Pettyfer, father of the English actor Alex Pettyfer, was an original member on the first ever show and appeared weekly for the first seven months. Clive Clarke performed in the last ever performance of Zoo with the choreographer Les Child.

Julie Brown was partnered with Wesley Pestano dancing to Shalamar's 'There it Is' on Top of the Pops on 9 September 1982.

The total number of dancers who ever appeared as part of a Zoo line-up is uncertain, but among the regular members of Zoo were:

- "Downtown" Julie Brown
- Wesley Pestano
- Clive "Rubber Man" Clarke
- Mary Corpe
- Sharon "Sid" Haywoode
- Julie Harris
- Richard Pettyfer
- Jeanette Landray
- Eddie Kemp
- Deborah Dean
- Anita Mahadervan
- Voyd (Yvonne Evans)
- Debbie Fox (Foxy)
- Penni Dunlop
- Jon Peterson
- Alison Thomas
- Michelle Taylor
- Lance Aston
- Geoffery Unkovich
- Nicola scott Valentine

== "Flick Colby's Zoo" ==
There were at least two occasions where individual members of Zoo choreographed the troupe's dance routine on TOTP in place of Flick Colby. These occurred on 8 April 1982, with a routine to Shalamar's "I Can Make You Feel Good", choreographed by Radford Quist, and 21 July 1983, with a routine to Gary Byrd and the GB Experience's "The Crown", choreographed by Eddie Kemp (which also featured Dee Iva of early robotic duo Flex).

These are believed to be the only dance routines by the resident dance troupe featured on TOTP between 1970 and 1983 which were not credited to Flick Colby. On these occasions, the troupe were introduced by the presenter, and named on the programme's end credits, as "Flick Colby's Zoo", with the member responsible for choreographing the routine given an individual credit.

== The end of Zoo ==
Zoo's tenure as the TOTP resident dance troupe coincided with the development of the music video. While previous dance troupes appeared almost every week on TOTP since the early 1970s, the troupe did not appear on the edition broadcast on 27 November 1981, and throughout 1982 it was common for Zoo to appear only once a month on TOTP as the show chose to broadcast a band or artist's video if they were unable to commit to a studio appearance.

As 1982 drew to a close and 1983 began, Zoo's appearances became less frequent - no credited routines were featured from 30 December 1982 to 24 February 1983.

Zoo's last credited routine for TOTP was shown on 29 September 1983. Female dancer Jeanette appeared alongside Clive Clarke, Les Child and two female dancers in a routine to Unique's "What I Got Is What You Need". This episode was also the last one to feature Flick Colby's involvement as "Dance Director", rounding off a 15-year association with Top of the Pops.

== A replacement? ==
The Top of the Pops production team did not directly put together a replacement for Zoo or Flick Colby. Instead, a varying line-up of dancers were individually invited to appear on the programme, many of whom became regular sights on TOTP dancing among the audience during the mid-1980s. This collection of dancers became known to the production staff as "cheerleaders", and they were seen on the programme until early 1986.

== Life after Zoo ==
Some of the dancers who appeared in routines by Zoo went on to achieve success after leaving the troupe:

- Clive Clarke Became a choreographer for films, commercials and pop-promotionals working with an international cast of music performers throughout the 1980s and 1990s. He is also the bartender in the video for the Rick Astley song "Never Gonna Give You Up"
- Deborah Dean went on to have several starring roles in London's West End before taking a job as a performance coach with P&O Cruises
- "Downtown" Julie Brown combined her appearances on TOTP with co-hosting duties on children's series Crackerjack. In the late 1980s, she moved to the United States to become an MTV presenter (including host of Club MTV) and actress. She also appeared as a contestant in the American version of I'm a Celebrity, Get Me Out of Here! in 2003.
- Sharon "Sid" Haywoode became a singer, best known for her hit "Roses", which reached Number 11 in the UK single charts in 1986. She also guest-starred in Dutch band The Limit's Top of the Pops performance of "Say Yeah!". She later moved to the United States to continue her singing career. Prior to joining Zoo, she appeared on The Benny Hill Show during the 1980 series as one of the "Hill's Angels."
- Julie Harris joined the line-up of Tight Fit before the release of their UK Number 1 version of "The Lion Sleeps Tonight", and went on to record under the name "Chopper Harris".
- Anita Mahadervan combined her appearances with Zoo with her role in Legs & Co., who continued their dancing career after leaving TOTP in 1981. In the summer of 1982, she appeared twice on TOTP as a member of Toto Coelo. She later joined the band Cherry Bombz and pursued an acting career, including an appearance as a nurse in an episode of One Foot In The Grave.
- Voyd was in the original cast of Starlight Express and continued with the show for years. She was also in the musical version of Kit Williams Masquerade with Sarah Brightman. Appeared in the movies Monty Python's The Meaning of Life, It Couldn't Happen Here, videos for Depeche Mode (Just Can't Get Enough) and Buck's Fizz (London Town). Voyd was a favourite dancer of Arlene Phillips and assisted her for many years.
- Penni Dunlop was part of Hot Gossip and appeared with them on The Kenny Everett Show. She was in the original cast of Chess at the Prince Edward Theatre, London, featured in the Depeche Mode video "Just Can't Get Enough" and was also in the dance group called "Shock".
- Jeanette Landray was recruited to perform lead vocals on the Blue Sunshine album by The Cure/Siouxsie and the Banshees side-project/super-group, The Glove.
- Jon Peterson performed on the West End, including in Cats. He appeared in Duran Duran's Wild Boys video promo with Eddie Kemp.

Nicola Scott Valentine , was a dancer on the Newcastle based tv programme The tube and then later went on to be a make up artist in film and tv.
