= Alan David (singer) =

British pop singer

Alan David is a British pop singer of the 1960s and 1970s. He released several singles first for Decca, then for EMI, from 1964 to 1978. David appeared, playing himself as a singer in a band, in the film Gonks Go Beat (1965), and co-hosted the BBC2 TV show Gadzooks, It's The In Crowd in June, 1965 with Lulu.

== Discography ==
- Alan David (Decca, 1965)
- Life in the City (EMI, 1978)
- Alan David (EMI, 1981)
