= Go-Jos =

British TV dance troupe (1964–1971)

The Go-Jos in the film Moon Zero Two (1969)

The Go-Jos were a British TV dance troupe, created for the BBC1 TV music chart show Top of the Pops in late 1964, appearing regularly on the show until mid-1968. They were the first of a series of five dance troupes on the programme. They also appeared on other BBC and ITV shows, finally disbanding in 1971.

== Formation ==
The troupe were formed by Jo Cook, who had been a member of the TV dance troupe the Silhouettes in the early 1960s. She then became a founder member of the Beat Girls, appearing in The Beat Room, a weekly pop show on BBC2, from July 1964. She was forced to leave the Beat Girls in October 1964 due to a contractual dispute.

In November 1964, Top of the Pops producers had decided a dance troupe was needed to perform when the act was not available. Jo Cook won the job of providing this troupe, and so created the group, the Go-Jos, named after herself. Their first performance was on 19 November 1964 dancing to "Baby Love" by the Supremes. When dancing on Top of the Pops to the latest pop hits, the group were usually dressed in the mini skirts and high boots that were fashionable at the time. The Go-Jos were not fully resident; they typically only appeared every few weeks.

== Top of the Pops ==
In the beginning, on Top of the Pops, Linda Hotchkin and Jane Bartlett performed with Pat Hughes. Hughes left towards the end of June 1965, and Jo Cook herself appeared over the next few months.

The troupe changed again later in 1965 when Jo Cook finally quit dancing to focus on choreography. Barbara von der Heyde and Thelma Bignell joined by the beginning of 1966, and Linda Hotchkin temporarily left, creating a three-person group.

Hotchkin rejoined in early 1967, and the group expanded to six in 1968 with the addition of Lesley Larbey and Wendy Hillhouse.

However, the BBC decided in mid-1968 to replace the Go-Jos with Pan's People on Top of the Pops.

Their final performance was on 20 June 1968, dancing to "Jumping Jack Flash" by the Rolling Stones.

Only one Top of the Pops performance by the Go-Jos is known to survive, "Reflections" by Diana Ross and the Supremes, transmitted on 26 December 1967.

== The Jo Cook Dancers ==
Jo Cook rebadged the Go-Jos as the Jo Cook Dancers when they appeared on the sixth and last series of Thank Your Lucky Stars, replacing the Dance Centre group, the Lucky Stars.

This series ran from 2 October 1965 to 31 December 1966 with regular Go-Jo dancers Linda Hotchkin, Jane Bartlett, Barbara von der Heyde and Thelma Bignell in performances with a chart band.

== Timeline ==
The following chart shows the timeline of the GoJos on Top of the Pops and the Jo Cook Dancers and GoJos on Thank Your Lucky Stars.

== Later years ==
The group continued for several years appearing on a variety of TV shows, including the Val Doonican show and The Goodies. As the Go-Jos, they worked with Lulu in 1967 on the music and comedy series Three of a Kind, which also featured Mike Yarwood.

They appeared in the 1966 Southern TV show Tale of Two Rivers with Lesley Judd appearing as a member with Linda Hotchkin and Barbara von der Heyde.

The group appeared in the film Moon Zero Two in 1969, but with none of the regular members.

Jo Cook and Linda Hotchkin appeared in Top of the Pops: The True Story in 2001 talking about their time on Top of the Pops.
