= Flick Colby =

American dancer and choreographer (1946–2011)

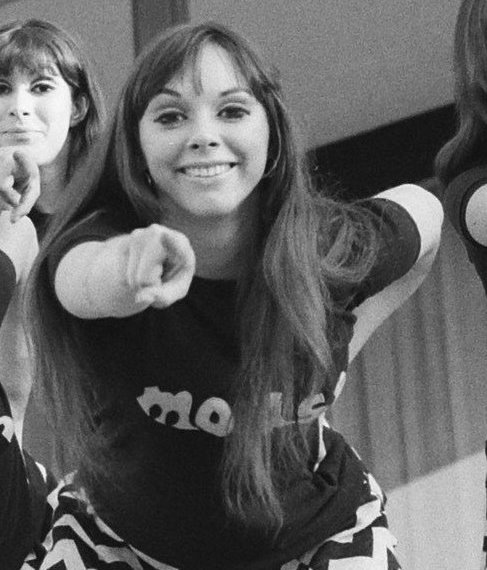
- Born: Felicity Isabelle Colby; March 23, 1946; Danville, Pennsylvania
- Died: May 26, 2011 (aged 65); Clinton, New York
- Occupations: dancer, choreographer
- Years active: 1968–1976 (dancer—until 1972—and choreographer for Pan's People), 1976–1983 (choreographer for Ruby Flipper, Legs & Co., and Zoo on Top of the Pops)

Felicity Isabelle "Flick" Colby (March 23, 1946 – May 26, 2011) was an American dancer and choreographer best known for being a founding member of and the choreographer of the United Kingdom dance troupe Pan's People, which appeared on the BBC1 chart show Top of the Pops from 1968 to 1976. Colby became the full-time dance choreographer for the Top of the Pops dance troupes Pan's People, Ruby Flipper, Legs & Co., and Zoo (credited as "Dance Director"), from 1972 until 1983.

== Early life ==
Colby was born in Danville, Pennsylvania. Her father was Thomas E. Colby, Professor of German at Hamilton College in Clinton, New York. As a child, Colby lived in Clinton and later in Massachusetts. Educated at a school in New Hampshire and Abbot Academy (Andover, Massachusetts), she began attending ballet and other dance classes in Boston and performed in musicals before travelling to London in 1966.

== Career ==
In 1966, Colby founded Pan's People, an all-female dance troupe most commonly associated with Top of the Pops. She choreographed routines for Pan's People on the series for eight years, from late 1968 until 1976. The weekly record chart was released on Tuesday mornings, and the live show aired on Thursday evenings. This created a need for regular studio appearances by the top artists who often had hectic touring schedules that made it difficult for them to be present on the show. Colby had six hours to create a dance routine for an absent act's single, choreographing moves to suit a wide range of musical styles such as disco, punk, glam rock, soul, and folk. Pan's People went through changes in line-up; by December 1967 it comprised Colby, Dee Dee Wilde, Babs Lord, Louise Clarke, Ruth Pearson, and Andrea Rutherford (later replaced by Cherry Gillespie).

Pan's People earliest BBC television appearance was in 1968 on The Bobbie Gentry Show, initially broadcast on BBC2 and repeated later on BBC1. They first appeared on Top of the Pops in April 1968, and became a regular weekly feature in January 1970. Performances in other BBC productions followed, including Happening For Lulu; The Price of Fame (starring Georgie Fame and Alan Price) in 1969; and series such as Sez Les, The Black and White Minstrel Show, and The Goodies. In 1974, Pan's People released a single titled "You Can Really Rock and Roll Me", and made guest appearances on popular primetime programs such as The Two Ronnies and The Benny Hill Show. Colby also choreographed stage musicals such as Catch My Soul, starring the American singer, songwriter, and actor PJ Proby and PP Arnold.

From 1972, Colby decided to focus on choreographing rather than dancing, and thus ceased to perform with Pan's People but continued to choreograph their routines. When Pan's People wound down in 1976, she formed a new dance troupe for TOTP named Ruby Flipper, a mixed-sex troupe for which Colby could create more physically strenuous routines that included lifts. Ruby Flipper was quickly succeeded by Legs & Co., an all-female lineup that also performed in the 1978 film The Stud. Both troupes were managed by former Pan's People dancer Ruth Pearson. Legs & Co lasted on TOTP until 1981, at which point Colby formed the much larger dance troupe "Zoo", for which TOTP credited her as its "Dance Director". Zoo was seen on TOTP until 1983, after which the programme no longer used dancers.

In 1979, Colby co-wrote the instructional guide Let's Go Dancing with Elizabeth Romain.

== Personal life ==
For a few years after Colby's tenure with TOTP, she split her time between London and her family's home town of Clinton, New York, but eventually chose to settle down in Clinton, where she lived the remainder of her life. She owned and operated a gift shop named Paddywacks.

Colby married three times: first to writer Robert Marasco, then to James Ramble in 1967, and finally in 2003 to George Bahlke, a professor of literature at Hamilton College, where Colby's father had taught German.

Colby had breast cancer during the final years of her life, and died of bronchopneumonia at her home in Clinton in May 2011, aged 65, just four months after her husband George Bahlke died due to complications from pneumonia on 1 February. She was survived by her sister, and her brother Thomas Colby IV.

== Filmography ==
=== Television ===
| Year | Programme | Channel | Notes |
|---|---|---|---|
| 2001 | The True Story of TOTP | BBC One | Guest |
