= The Dance Centre =

Coordinates: 51.5124°N 0.1243°W

The Dance Centre, previously at 12 Floral Street, Covent Garden, central London, England, was founded by Valerie Tomalin (née Hyman) in 1964 as a space where dance teachers could hire small studios by the hour and large ballet companies, such as The Royal Ballet and Ballet Rambert, could rent larger studios by the day or by the week.

Individual artists such as Margot Fonteyn, Wayne Sleep and Rudolf Nureyev used the smaller spaces to privately fine-tune their performances. The venture was inspired by Valerie's fascination with ballet. As an art-student Valerie bought student tickets for The Royal Opera House top gallery so that she could see the great Russian dancers take command of the aging stage. Subsequently, Valerie became fascinated by modern dance and especially American jazz which was championed in those days by Matt Mattox.

Other teachers who quickly found the facilities helpful include Gillian Gregory, Diana South, and Mike St.Leger Arlene Phillips, Lindsay Kemp, Molly Molloy and Gary Cockrell.

Many of the dance students themselves went on to successful careers, for example David Bowie, who cites Lindsay Kemp's mime classes as being a fundamental inspiration for the character Ziggy Stardust, and Kate Bush.

By the mid-1960s, the Dance Centre was a Covent Garden Landmark. At that time virtually all the other buildings in Floral Street were vegetable or fruit warehouses. In fact the Dance Centre itself had previously been a banana-drying warehouse and before that it was a poor school. As a listed three-storey building, the bell-tower can still be seen rising above the other Floral Street retail units. The fruit and vegetable market was established in the 1600s as a growing area literally annexed to a convent; hence the name.

Eventually many west-end and national shows auditioned there and rehearsed there too.

The Dance Centre also operated its own leading theatrical agency under Rob Gardell.

It commissioned its own ballet shoes, tights, leotards and leg-warmers. The idea of such brand extension was pioneering in its day.

It also created its own dance troupes called The Beat Girls, later to become Pan's People.

In 1971, theatre producer Ian Albery asked The Dance Centre to help rent its warehouse (just around the corner in Earlham Street) to theatrical companies. So successful was The Dance Centre in reviving this space that the warehouse thrived and became The Donmar Theatre.

Valerie Tomalin's business partner Gary Cockrell opened The Sanctuary next door at number 11 Floral Street, and Valerie opened The Costume Centre in King Street in the centre of Covent Garden just by the piazza.
