= Dance troupe =

Group of dancers

A dance troupe or dance company is a group of dancers and associated personnel who work together to perform dances as a sport, spectacle or entertainment. There are many different types of dance companies, often working in different styles of dance. Some companies are formed from members of dance studios or from paid professionals. Dance company members can range from as young as two years old up to 18 years old. Dance troupes may be formed for competition purposes. Many dance companies are established within cities to be near theatres or other performing art venues. A dance troupe will likely have performance costumes, sets or props, and proper footwear. A dance studio will more than likely be the location where dance classes and or practices will take place.

== History ==
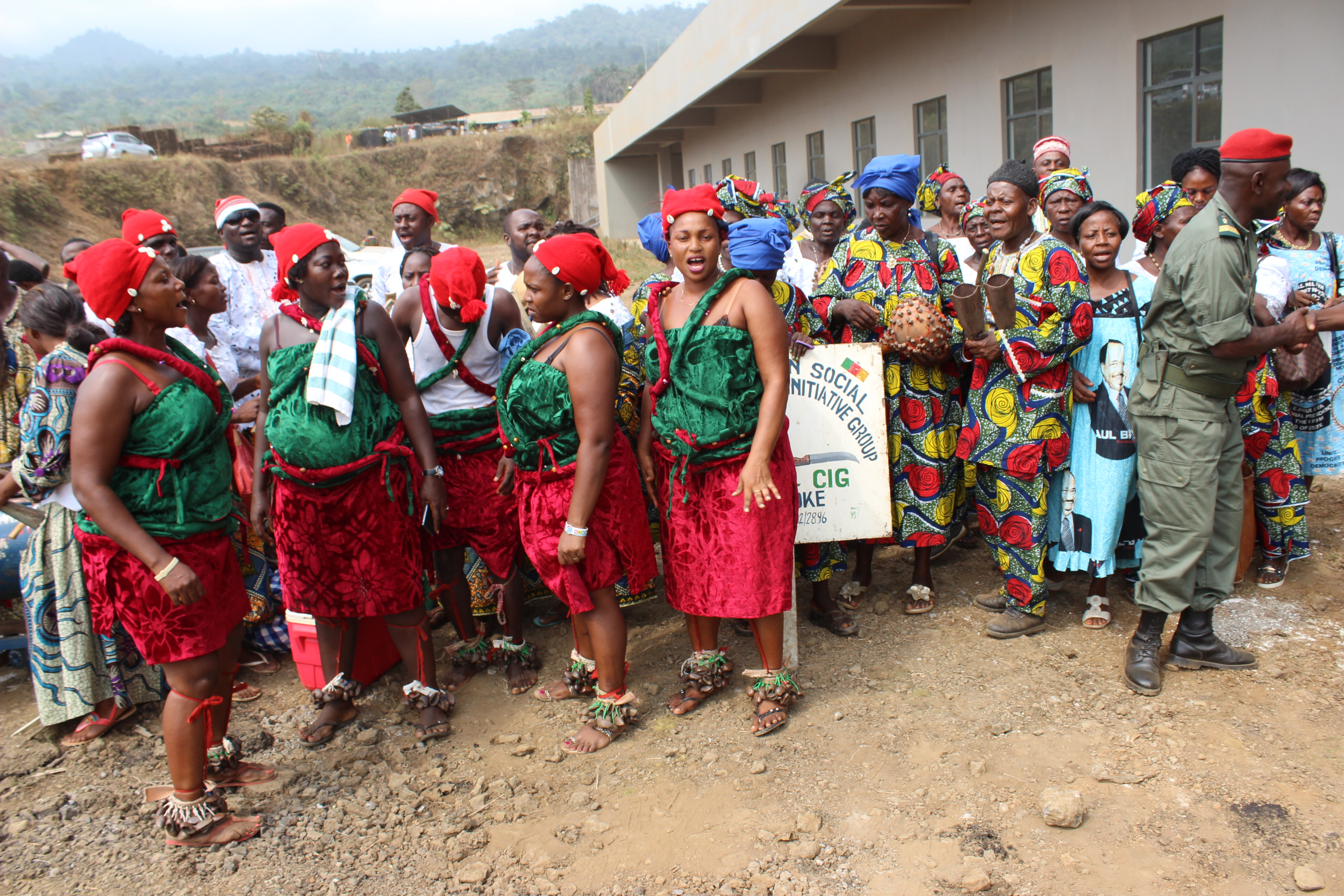
GroupeDanseInauguration11

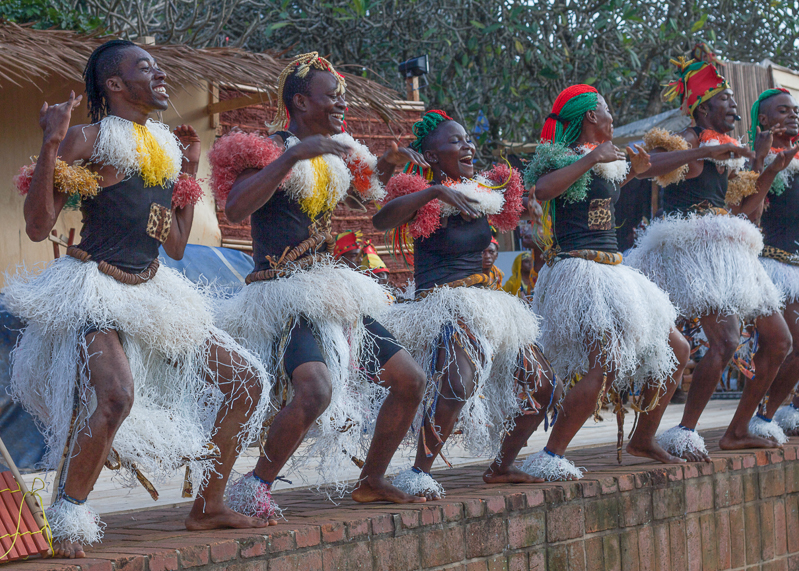
Transes

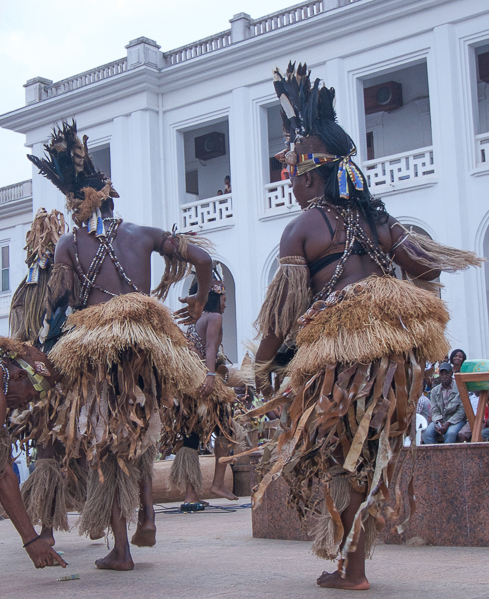
Communion1

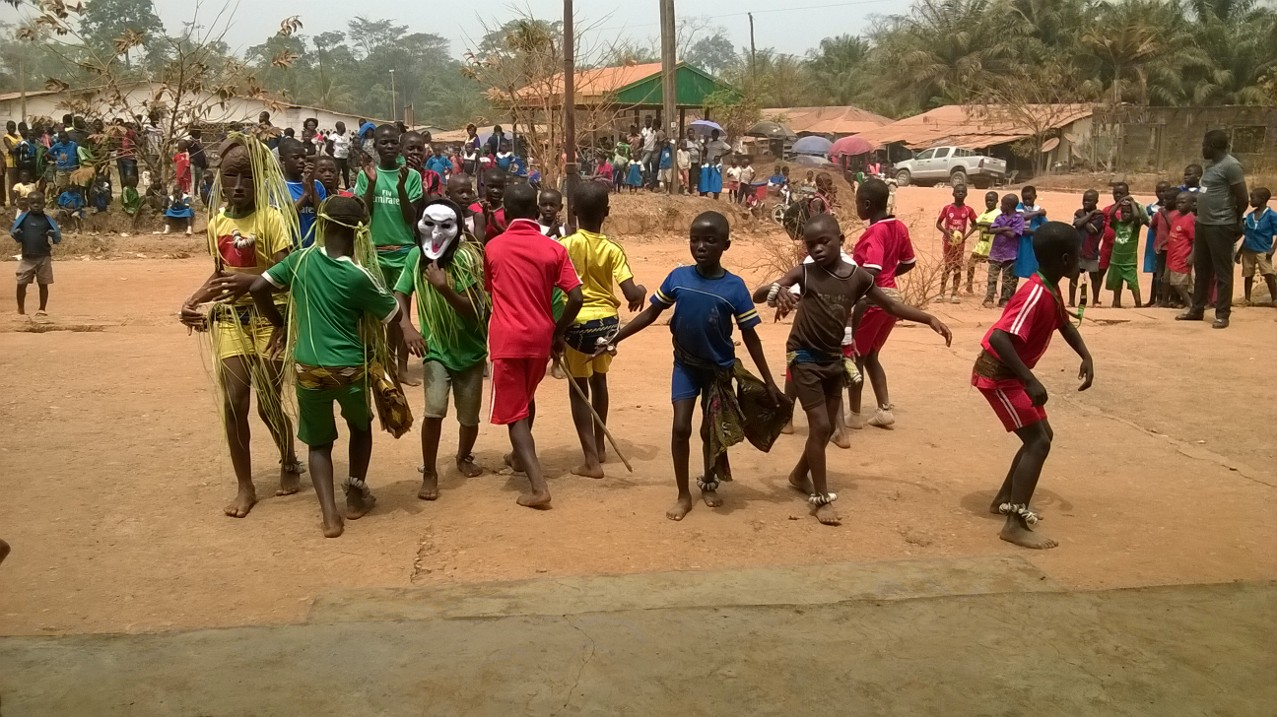
Tinto school children

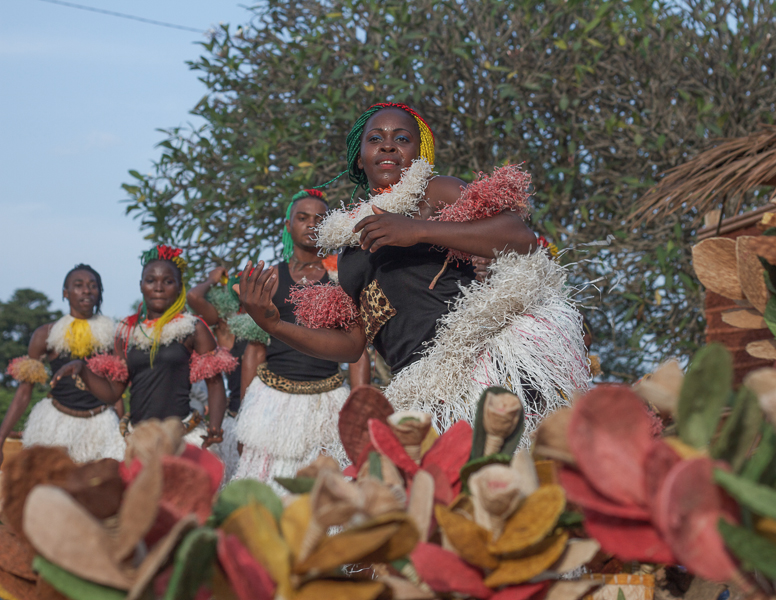
Transe 2

There is evidence that shows the start of dance troupes in Roman and Greek times. These groups were originally for musicals and performed in theatres. Dance troupes would perform for the high class as a form of entertainment. As music evolved so did the types of dance troupes. In more recent years, dance troupes are seen on musical television programs. In the New York Times article, Sequins and Soul-Searching in the Competitive Dance World, Margaret Fuhurer discusses the backlash dance companies have received in recent years. Fuhurer states, "For decades, the industry has attracted criticism for its exclusionary costs, high-pressure environments and sexualization of children. Recently, however, the calls for change have become broader and deeper, encompassing issues of race, gender and predatory behavior. And many of today’s critics are young studio directors and convention faculty members — artists who grew up in this world, have witnessed both its power and its problems, and understand how to use social media to sound the alarm."

Dance troupes or dance companies have been on multiple different TV shows over the years of reality television. These shows include:

America's Got Talent – Including but not limited to, Urban Crew Flyers, Just Jerk, Zurcaroh, V.Unbeatable, Beyond Belief Dance Company, John Green High School Dance Team, Fusion Japan, and MPLUSPLUS.

America's Best Dance Crew – Including but not limited to, Jabbawockees, Super Cr3w, We Are Heroes, Poreotics, I.aM.mE, and Elektrolytes.

== Roles ==
- Choreographers
- Dancers
- Board of directors
- Receptionist
- Marketing manager
- Finance manager
- Répétiteur or rehearsal director
- Stage manager
- Lighting & Costume designers
- General manager

In small companies several of these functions will be carried out by the same person without explicit job titles, while a ballet company, for example, is often larger and has a more defined set up. Many dance companies hire professional dancers to work for them. These dancers will perform in the concert, showcase, or performance the company is putting together. Company dancers can be hired for long periods of time.

== See also ==
- Dance crew
- List of dance companies
- List of dancers
