= The Greatest Hits (Lulu album) =

Greatest hits album by Lulu
- Released: 2003
- Recorded: 1964–2002
- Genre: Pop
- Label: Mercury

Lulu chronology
Together (2002)	The Greatest Hits (2003)	Back on Track (2004)

The Greatest Hits is a compilation album by Lulu, released in 2003. The album highlights her 40-year career in music from 1964's UK top-ten hit "Shout" through 2002's "We've Got Tonight," a UK top-five duet with Ronan Keating. It also covers everything in between, including her 1967 US No. 1 Hit "To Sir With Love", the 1969 Eurovision Song Contest winner "Boom Bang-a-Bang", the 1974 James Bond theme "The Man with the Golden Gun", the 1993 comeback single "Independence" and the UK No. 1 Hit "Relight My Fire" (a duet with Take That).

The album combines her UK hits such as "The Boat That I Row" and "The Man Who Sold The World", as well as her successful singles in the US like "Oh Me Oh My (I'm A Fool For You Baby)" and "I Could Never Miss You (More Than I Do)". Tracks from her 2002 album Together are also featured, including duets with Elton John and Sting. The final track, "First Of May" is a duet with her former husband Maurice Gibb, taken from her "An Audience With Lulu" ITV television special, making it the only song which debuted on the CD.

== Track listing ==
No.	Title	Writer(s)	Length
1.	"Shout" (with The Luvvers)	Rudolph Isley, Ronald Isley, O'Kelly Isley, Jr.	2:55
2.	"Independence" (Brothers in Rhythm mix)	Leon Ware, Winston Sela	4:13
3.	"Relight My Fire" (with Take That)	Dan Hartman	4:08
4.	"Teardrops" (with Elton John)	Linda Womack, Cecil Womack	4:45
5.	"I Don't Wanna Fight"	Lulu, Billy Lawrie, Steve DuBerry	4:45
6.	"We've Got Tonight" (with Ronan Keating)	Bob Seger	3:37
7.	"The Man Who Sold the World"	David Bowie	3:51
8.	"Where the Poor Boys Dance" (Almighty mix)	Lulu, Lawrie, David Tyson	3:51
9.	"Hurt Me So Bad"	Lawrie, Tyson	3:53
10.	"To Sir With Love"	Mark London, Don Black	2:43
11.	"Oh Me Oh My (I'm a Fool for You Baby)"	Jim Doris	2:40
12.	"I Could Never Miss You (More Than I Do)"	Neil Harrison	3:08
13.	"Sail on Sailor" (with Sting)	Brian Wilson, Van Dyke Parks, Tandyn Almer, Ray Kennedy, Jack Rieley	3:24
14.	"I'm Back for More" (with Bobby Womack)	Ken Stover	5:07
15.	"The Man with the Golden Gun"	John Barry, Black	2:34
16.	"The Boat That I Row"	Neil Diamond	2:42
17.	"Boom Bang-a-Bang"	Alan Moorhouse, Peter Warne	2:20
18.	"First of May" (Live) (with Maurice Gibb)	Barry Gibb, Robin Gibb, Maurice Gibb	3:07

== Chart performance ==
- In the United Kingdom, the album debuted at No. 35 and spent 2 weeks on the UK Albums Chart.
