= To Sir, with Love (disambiguation) =

To Sir, with Love may refer to:

- To Sir, With Love (novel), a 1959 novel by E. R. Braithwaite
- To Sir, with Love, a 1967 British drama film starring Sidney Poitier, adapted from the 1959 novel
- "To Sir with Love" (song), the theme song to the 1967 film, originally performed by Lulu
- To Sir, with Love (album), the soundtrack album to the 1967 film, featuring Lulu and The Mindbenders
- To Sir, with Love II, a 1996 American television drama film, a sequel to the 1967 film
- To Sir, with Love (2006 film), a South Korean horror film
