= Independence (Lulu album) =

Studio album by Lulu
- Released: 22 February 1993
- Recorded: July–November 1992
- Studios: Middle Ear, Miami Beach
- Genres: Pop; electronic
- Label: Dome
- Producers: Errol Henry; Cary Bayle; Eliot Kennedy; Mike Ward; Ian Green; Nick Martinelli; Barry Gibb; Maurice Gibb

Lulu chronology
Take Me to Your Heart Again (1982)	Independence (1993)	Together (2002)

Professional ratings
Review scores
Source	Rating
AllMusic	3/5 stars
Encyclopedia of Popular Music	3/5 stars
Music Week	2/5 stars
Rolling Stone	3/5 stars

Independence is an album by Scottish singer Lulu, released in 1993. It was Lulu's first release of new material since 1982.

== History ==
The title track was a hit in Europe, reaching No. 11 on the UK Singles Chart, and peaked at No. 3 on the US dance charts. It is described by reviewer Jose F. Promis as "...housey and anthem-like...(and) stands as one of the better dance-pop songs of the decade." The album only briefly charted in the UK Albums Chart, peaking at No. 67.

Rolling Stone gave the album three stars, describing it as "a classy, good-hearted effort." Spin magazine recommended the album, describing Lulu as having assumed "the mantle of soul survivor, achieving (Lisa) Stansfield status on the title track." Jose F. Promis, in reviewing the album for AllMusic, stated that "This isn't a bad album, by any means; it just could have been better."

Three of the tracks are covers—"How 'Bout Us" was a 1981 international hit for US R&B band Champaign, "I'm Back for More" was originally recorded by Marlena Shaw and a 1980 duet version recorded by Al Johnson and Jean Carne, and "Rhythm of Romance" was previously recorded by Sheena Easton and Glen Goldsmith. "Let Me Wake Up in Your Arms" was produced by Lulu's ex-husband Maurice Gibb with his brother Barry Gibb. "Restless Moods" was later recorded by its co-writer Ruby Turner.

== Track listing ==
1. "Independence" (Winston Sela, Leon Ware) 4:16
2. "There Has Got to Be a Way" (Sami McKinney, Kenny Moore, Allee Willis) 4:22
3. "Restless Moods" (Wayne Brown, Ruby Turner) 4:27
4. "I'm Back for More" featuring Bobby Womack (Ken Stover) 5:06
5. "How 'Bout Us" (Dana Walden; Producer; Nick Martinelli 4:52
6. "Until I Get Over You" (Simon Climie, Rob Fisher, Dennis Morgan) 3:28
7. "Let Me Wake Up in Your Arms" (Barry Gibb, Maurice Gibb, Robin Gibb) 4:30
8. "You Left Me Lonely" (Errol Henry) 4:42
9. "Rhythm of Romance" (Kerry Chater, Michael Jay) 4:17
10. "I'm Walking Away" (Steve DuBerry, Lulu) 4:55
11. "A Place to Fall" (Chuck Jones) 3:29
12. "Let Me Wake Up in Your Arms (Romantic Reprise)" remix by Frankie Knuckles

== Production and personnel ==
- Tracks 3, 4, 8, 10 and 11 produced by Errol Henry. Tracks 3, 8, 10 and 11 recorded and mixed by Chris Madden. Track 4 recorded and mixed by Chris Madden and Barry Rudolph. Graham Harvey: Keyboards; Errol Henry: Keyboards, Electric Bass, Drum Programming; Patrick Clahar (saxophone), Kevin Robinson (trumpet and flugelhorn), Fayyaz Virgi; Andrew Smith: Guitars on track 11; Winston Blissott: Bass on track 11
- Track 1 produced by Cary Bayle, Eliot Kennedy and Mike Ward for Five Boys Productions, with additional production by Brothers in Rhythm. Recorded and mixed by Paul Wright and Brothers in Rhythm. Steve Anderson: Keyboards; Cary Baylis: Guitars; Steve Beighton: Saxophone
- "Independence" produced by Cary Baylis, Eliot Kennedy, Mike Ward
- "There Has Got to Be a Way" produced by Ian Green, mixed by Essentials
- "How 'Bout Us" produced by Nick Martinelli
- "Until I Get Over You" produced by Ian Green
- "Let Me Wake Up in Your Arms" produced by Barry and Maurice Gibb
- "Rhythm of Romance" produced by Essentials
- "Let Me Wake Up In Your Arms (Romantic Reprise)" remixed by Frankie Knuckles

== Charts ==
Chart (1993)	Peak position
UK Albums Chart	67
