= Take Me to Your Heart Again =

Studio album by Lulu
- Released: 1982
- Recorded: 1982
- Genre: Pop, pop rock
- Label: Alfa
- Producer: Mark London

Lulu chronology
Lulu (1981)	Take Me to Your Heart Again (1982)	Independence (1993)

Take Me to Your Heart Again is a 1982 album by Lulu, released on Alfa Records.

== History ==
The album was produced by Mark London, who had produced Lulu's two previous albums, Lulu (1981) and Don't Take Love For Granted (1978). Singles of the album cuts "I Will Do If For Your Love" and "Take Me to Your Heart Again" were issued in the UK, with videos prepped for both tracks, but neither song charted. The album was only issued in the UK, Australia and Japan, and was not successful. Lulu would not release another album of new material until the Independence album, released in 1993.

== Track listing ==
1. "I Will Do It For Your Love" (Chris Rea)
2. "Nobody Needs Your Love More Than I Do" (Randy Newman)
3. "You Had to Be There" (Peter Frampton, Gordon Kennedy, Wayne Kirkpatrick)
4. "Go Now" (John Keller, Geoff Lieb)
5. "I Don't Go Shopping" (Peter Allen, David Lasley)
6. "Let Her Go" (Bob Corbin, David Hanner)
7. "You're Working Nights Now" (Neil Harrison)
8. "If You Steal My Heart Away" (Steve Swindells)
9. "How Can I Believe You" (Neil Harrison)
10. "Take Me to Your Heart Again" (Jeb Million)

== Musicians ==
- Lulu: lead and background vocals
- Lynton Niaff: keyboards; string and horn arrangements
- Mike Moran: keyboards; string and horn arrangements
- Ronnie Caryl: guitars
- Alan Jones: bass
- Peter Van Hooke: drums
- Ray Cooper: percussion
- Ron Asprey: sax solos
- Alan Carvell: backing vocals
- Carol Kenyon: backing vocals

== Production team ==
- Producer: Mark London
- Engineer: Jon Kelly
- Assistant engineers: Tim Palmer, David Wooley, J.J.
