= I Could Never Miss You (More Than I Do) =

Single by Lulu

from the album^{1)}Don't Take Love for Granted^{2)}Lulu
- B-side: "Dance to the Feeling In Your Heart"
- Released: July 1981
- Recorded: 1978 at Air Studios (Oxford Street)
- Genre: Easy listening
- Length: 3:10
- Label: Alfa Records
- Songwriter: Neil Harrison
- Producers: Mark London; Lem Lubin

Lulu singles chronology
| "I Love to Boogie" (1979) | "I Could Never Miss You (More Than I Do)" (1981) | "Independence" (1993) |

"I Could Never Miss You (More Than I Do)" was the fourth and final US Top 40 hit for Lulu.

== History ==
"I Could Never Miss You (More Than I Do)" was introduced on Lulu's 1978 album Don't Take Love For Granted, a Rocket Records release co-produced by Mark London the co-writer of Lulu's signature song "To Sir, With Love" and also the husband of Lulu's longtime manager Marion Massey. The album's other co-producer was Lem Lubin onetime bassist with Unit 4 + 2 and Christie and from 1977 a&r head for Rocket Records.

Session Personnel for I Could Never
Miss You (More Than I Do) by Lulu
Drums • Trevor Spencer 1 Bass • Alan Tarney
Keyboards • Lynton Naiff 1 Guitars • Ray Russell
Percussion • Ray Cooper
Chorale • Joanne Stone, Stevie Lange, Vicki Brown
String arrangement • Lynton Naiff
Orchestra Leader • Gavyn Wright

According to Lulu, Mark London had discovered Neil Harrison and asked Lulu to record demos of Harrison's compositions to pitch to another singer: (quote Lulu:) "as soon as we did the demos it was very obvious that they weren't going to be demos. They were obviously going to be for me." A total of four Harrison compositions would appear on the Don't Take Love For Granted including the title cut and "Love is the Sweetest Mistake" which were respectively the A-side and B-side of the overlooked lead single.

In 1981 Alfa Records acquired Lulu's Rocket Records recordings and released "I Could Never Miss You (More Than I Do)" as a single backed with "Dance to the Feeling in Your Heart" - the latter track had been a non-album B-side being the flip of "I Love to Boogie" the second single off the UK edition of the Don't Take Love For Granted album. "I Could Never Miss You (More Than I Do)" was issued in July 1981 in the US where Lulu's US profile had received a recent boost via her participation in two ATV series devoted to rock and roll music: Oh Boy aired in the autumn of 1980 while Let's Rock ran over the summer of 1981.

The 1981 success of "I Could Never Miss You (More Than I Do)" resulted in Alfa issuing a self-titled album by Lulu featuring "I Could Never Miss You (More Than I Do)" plus two other tracks from the Don't Take Love For Granted album: the title cut plus "You Are Still a Part of Me", with seven newly recorded tracks completing the album.

== Chart performance ==
"I Could Never Miss You (More Than I Do)" debuted on the Billboard Hot 100 in August 1981, rising to a #18 peak in October. This marked Lulu's first appearance in the US Top 20 since "To Sir, with Love" in 1967. "I Could Never Miss You" - whose Cash Box peak was #14 - also reached #2 on Billboard's Adult Contemporary chart.

The US success of "I Could Never Miss You (More Than I Do)" translated into only a glimmer of interest in Lulu's native United Kingdom, where the single - issued October 1981 - peaked at #62 in the final week of 1981 – it would mark Lulu's sole UK charting between "Take Your Mama For a Ride" in 1975 and "Shout" in 1986. "I Could Never Miss You (More Than I Do)" also charted low in Australia at #71, although this was somewhat offset by a 16-week run. Canada's RPM magazine ranked "I Could Never Miss You (More Than I Do)" with a #10 peak. The track had its strongest chart impact in New Zealand with an April 1982 peak of #3, which remains the highest post-1960s' peak on a national Pop chart for a solo recording by Lulu (tying with the 1974 UK chart peak of "The Man Who Sold the World").

== Other versions ==
- Melba Moore as "I Could Never Miss You More" for her 1980 album Closer
- Bobbi Walker as "I Could Never Miss You" for her 1980 album Diamond in the Rough
- Shirley Bassey as "Nadie Más Te Quiso (Como Yo)" (Nobody loves you more [than me]) for her 1989 Spanish language album La Mujer whose producer Leonardo Schultz wrote the new lyrics.
- Syd Dale as an instrumental on his album Love Isn't Just For The Young
