= Ngaire =

Ngaire (pronounced NY-ree), sometimes spelt Nyree, is a feminine given name, most often found in New Zealand. Its specific origins and meaning are unclear, except that it probably has Polynesian origins. In the Māori language it is spelt Ngaere, like the town, and means "swamp" or "wetlands", or possibly "rolling sea", or "necklace shell", or "flax flower".

It may refer to:

== People ==
=== Ngaire ===
- Ngaiire (born 1984), Papua New Guinean singer, also known as Ngaire Joseph
- Ngaire Blankenberg (born 1971/72), South African-Canadian museum director
- Ngaire Drake (born 1949), New Zealand marathon runner
- Ngaire Fuata, New Zealand singer known as simply Ngaire
- Ngaire Kerse, New Zealand medical academic
- Ngaire Lane (1925–2021), New Zealand Olympic swimmer
- Ngaire Pigram, Australian singer, dancer, actor, screenwriter, and director
- Ngaire Smith (born 1979), Australian hockey player
- Ngaire Thomas (1943–2012), New Zealand author
- Ngaire Woods (born 1962/63), New Zealand academic at the University of Oxford

=== Nyree ===
- Nyree Kindred (born 1980), Welsh paralympic swimmer
- Nyree Dawn Porter (born Ngaire; 1936–2001), New Zealand-British actress
- Nyree Roberts (born 1976), American basketball player

== Fictional characters ==
- Ngaire Munroe, a character in New Zealand television programmes Outrageous Fortune and Westside
- Ngaire Thompson, a character in New Zealand television programme Shortland Street

== Other uses ==
- "Ngaire", a song by The Mutton Birds' on the 1993 album Salty
- Ngaire (album), 1991 album by Ngaire Fuata

== See also ==
- Ngaere, a township in Taranaki, New Zealand
- Nairi (disambiguation)
