= Don't Take Love for Granted =

Studio album by Lulu
- Released: July 1979
- Recorded: 1978
- Studios: Air Studios, London
- Genres: Pop, pop rock
- Label: The Rocket Record Company
- Producers: Mark London, Lem Lubin

Lulu chronology
Heaven and Earth and the Stars (1976)	Don't Take Love for Granted (1979)	Lulu (1981)

Don't Take Love for Granted is an album released in late 1978 by Lulu on Elton John's label, The Rocket Record Company.

== History ==
Don't Take Love for Granted was produced by Mark London - composer of Lulu's career record "To Sir With Love" and husband of Lulu's longtime manager Marion Massey - and Lem Lubin, one time bassist with Unit 4 + 2 and Christie and from 1977 A&R head for Rocket Records. According to Lulu the genesis of the album was a request from London that Lulu cut demos of several compositions by Neil Harrison a composer London had recently discovered: the intent was to pitch Harrison's songs to another singer, but as Lulu later said: "As soon as we did the demos it was very obvious that they weren't going to be demos. They were obviously going to be for me." Four of the tracks on the completed Don't Take Love For Granted were Neil Harrison compositions including the title cut which - with Harrison's "Love is the Sweetest Mistake" as B-side - was issued as lead single in September 1978, both in the UK and the US, where neither it nor its parent album attracted any significant attention.

The Don't Take Love For Granted album was released in England in 1979, with the Elton John-Gary Osborne track, "I Don't Care", being replaced by "I Love To Boogie", which was released as a single. The song was written by David Skillins and Mike Stubbs, the principal songwriters for the group Home, which Stubbs had fronted. Produced solely by Mark London, "I Love to Boogie" was released as a UK single, backed by the non-album track "Dance to the Feeling in Your Heart" (Neil Harrison). It was not successful.

The Neil Harrison composition "I Could Never Miss You (More Than I Do)" was eventually released as a single on Alfa Records and become a major hit for Lulu in 1981. "I Could Never Miss You..." and two other Harrison compositions introduced on the Don't Take Love For Granted album: the title cut and "You Are Still a Part of Me", were later included on an otherwise newly recorded 1981 album entitled Lulu.

== Track listing ==
1. "Don't Take Love for Granted" (Neil Harrison)
2. "I Could Never Miss You (More Than I Do)" (Neil Harrison)
3. "Come See What Love" (Bryn Haworth)
4. "Fool, Fool" (Troy Seals, Jerry McBee, Max D. Barnes)
5. "He's So in Love" (Russ Ballard)
6. "Nice and Slow" (Thom Bell, Elton John, Bernie Taupin)
7. "You Are Still a Part of Me" (Neil Harrison)
8. "I Don't Care" (Elton John, Gary Osborne)
9. "Bye Bye Now My Sweet Love" (Alan Tarney)
10. "Love is the Sweetest Mistake" (Neil Harrison)

== Personnel ==
- Lulu - lead vocals
- Ray Russell - guitar
- Alan Tarney, Pete Zorn - bass guitar
- John Coleman, Lynton Naiff - keyboards
- Peter Van Hooke, Trevor Spencer - drums
- Ray Cooper - percussion
- Joanne Stone, Stevie Lange, Vicki Brown - backing vocals
- Russ Ballard - guitar and backing vocals on "I Don't Care"
- Gavin Wright - strings leader
- John Coleman, Lynton Naiff, Ray Russell - string arrangements

Technical

- Jon Kelly - recording engineer
- Clive Arrowsmith - photography
