= To Sir, with Love II =

1996 television film directed by Peter Bogdanovich

- British DVD cover
- Genre: Drama
- Based on: Characters from To Sir, With Love by E. R. Braithwaite
- Written by: Philip Rosenberg
- Directed by: Peter Bogdanovich
- Starring: Sidney Poitier; Christian Payton; Dana Eskelson
- Music by: Trevor Lawrence
- Country of origin: United States
- Original language: English

Production
- Executive producers: Craig Baumgarten; Cedric Scott; Gary Adelson
- Producer: Richard Stenta
- Cinematography: William Birch
- Editor: Dianne Ryder-Rennolds
- Running time: 92 minutes
- Production companies: Verdon-Cedric Productions; Adelson/Baumgarten Productions; TriStar Television

Original release
- Network: CBS
- Release: April 7, 1996

To Sir, with Love II is a 1996 American drama television film directed by Peter Bogdanovich (his first television film). A sequel to the 1967 British film To Sir, with Love, it stars Sidney Poitier reprising the role of Mark Thackeray. The film premiered on April 7, 1996 on CBS. Like the first film, it deals with social issues in an inner city school.

== Plot ==
Mark Thackeray, from British Guiana by way of California, took a teaching position in a London East End school in the 1967 film. He spent twenty years teaching and ten in administrative roles. He has taught the children of his former pupils, and is now retiring.

Thackeray's former students, Pamela Dare and Barbara Pegg, come to the farewell party. Thackeray announces that he is leaving for an inner-city school in Chicago where he will teach again. In Chicago, he meets his former colleague Horace Weaver, who is the principal of the school. Thackeray learns that there is an A class with good students and an H (for "horror") class for the "no-gooders". He convinces the principal to let him take the H class as, in his own admission, that is what he does best. His new pupils are noisy, unruly and engaged in destructive behaviours. As he did in London, he starts by teaching them respect for others. He addresses the pupils as Mr or Miss and their last names, and expects to be called Mr. Thackeray or Sir by them in return.

Gradually, he learns their personal stories: Wilsie is a gang leader who protects his younger brother. A black female battles against double prejudice. Evie hides growing up without parents to avoid being fostered. A fellow teacher, Louisa Rodriguez, admires him.

It is revealed that as a teenager in British Guiana, Thackeray fell in love with a girl from Chicago. They lost contact and he went to Britain to study, became a teacher, and got married. Now a widower, Thackeray took this teaching opportunity hoping to find his earlier love.

At the new school, he sets out to teach the troubled students their true potential by taking their fates in their hands. He teaches about the non-violent resistance of the historic fighters of civil rights. When he discovers Wilsie smuggling a gun into the school, he confronts him and convinces him to yield the weapon and he delivers it to the police as a found object.

Later, the police pressure him to reveal the identity of the gun owner because the gun had been used to kill a police officer. He refuses and has to leave the school.

Evie, who works at a newspaper, investigates Thackeray's old love, Emily Taylor. Evie arranges for him to meet Taylor, and also meets her son. Thackeray learns that Taylor returned his affections, but her father kept Thackeray's letters from her because she was pregnant with Thackeray's son.

Thackeray learns that Wilsie is hiding because he thinks that the police are after him. He convinces Wilsie's brother to take him to the hiding place. Thackeray convinces Wilsie to give up violent gang life. After he confronts a rival gang looking for Wilsie, Wilsie and a friend with access to more firearms turn themselves in to the police.

The pupils stage a "stand in" to force the principal to reinstate their beloved teacher.

The term ends with a graduation ceremony, and a dance like in the original movie, where Thackeray announces that he is not returning to Britain but staying in Chicago to teach the new generation.

== Cast ==
- Sidney Poitier as Mark Thackeray
- Christian Payton as Wilsie Carrouthers
- Dana Eskelson as Evie Hillis
- Fernando López as Danny Laredo
- Casey Lluberes as Rebecca Torrado
- Michael Gilio as Frankie Davanon
- LZ Granderson as Arch Carrouthers
- Bernadette L. Clarke as LaVerne Mariner
- Jamie Kolacki as Stan Cameli
- Saundra Santiago as Louisa Rodriguez
- Cheryl Lynn Bruce as Emily Taylor
- Daniel J. Travanti as Horace Weaver
- Lulu as Barbara Pegg
- Judy Geeson as Pamela Dare
- Kris Wolff as Billy Lopatynski
- Mel Jackson as Tommie Rahwn
- John Beasley as Greg Emory
- Antonia Bogdanovich (the director's daughter) as Lynn Guzman
- Jason Winer as Leo Radatz
- Neil Flynn as Detective Dennis
- Irma P. Hall as Old Woman

== Reception ==
The film received mixed reviews. Scott Pierce of Deseret News dismissed the film as a remake of the original film, but praises Sidney Poitier for succeeding in this movie with sheer talent. John Leonard of New York describes the film as "a bad idea that turned into a pretty good one" and praises Peter Bogdanovich and Philip Rosenberg for being able to "make characters in the 60s work just as well in the 90s".
