= Junglies =

- Genre: Cartoon series Children's; Comedy
- Created by: Terry Ward
- Developed by: Bernie Kay
- Written by: Bernie Kay
- Directed by: Terry Ward
- Voices of: Gary Wilmot; Jessica Martin
- Narrated by: Gary Wilmot
- Opening theme: "We're the Junglies"
- Ending theme: "We're the Junglies" (Reprise)
- Composer: Mark London
- Country of origin: United Kingdom
- Original language: English
- No. of seasons: 1
- No. of episodes: 13

Production
- Producer: Terry Ward
- Production location: Junglie Island
- Editor: Morgan Daniels Ltd
- Camera setup: FilmFex Services
- Running time: 5 minutes per episode (approx.)
- Production company: Flicks Films Ltd

Original release
- Network: TV-am (UK)
- Release: 1991 – 1992

Junglies is a British short-lived animated television series created by Terry Ward. It aired from 1991 to 1992 on TV-am, and aired in repeats on BabyFirst from 2006 to 2009.

== Overview ==
The series is set on the fictional Junglie Island, an island somewhere between Africa and Asia. Each episode follows the adventures of several anthropomorphised animals called the Junglies, all of whom are portrayed as young children.

A total of 13 episodes were produced, and aired between 1992 and 1993 exclusively in the United Kingdom, some of which were released straight-to-video. The series has never been released on DVD, although one episode, "Flying South", was featured on both the VHS and DVD releases of the 1995 children's sing-along video A Day Full of Animals and Songs.

== Characters ==
Like Nellie the Elephant, another series by Ward, all the characters were only voiced by two actors, in this cast, all voices were provided by Gary Wilmot and Jessica Martin:

- Tyrone – An energetic and mischievous tiger who is the leader of the Junglies.
- Marvin – A mischievous and cheeky monkey.
- Geraldine – A bucktoothed giraffe who loves butterflies.
- Lester – An outspoken lion who is Tyrone's best friend.
- Penny – A parrot who speaks with a Scouse accent.
- Sebastian – A snake who speaks with a lisp.
- Henrietta – A blue hippopotamus whose mother is the school teacher.
- Ethel – A pink elephant who is Henrietta's best friend.
- Zoe – A patient zebra who speaks with a French accent.
- Albert – An alligator who is Marvin's best friend.
- Graham – A gorilla who only appears in the final episode of the series.
- The Sun – An unnamed, anthropomorphised sun. He is not always seen, has hands and arms and a face like a human, and wakes up (and goes to sleep) at the beginning and middle of various episodes.
- The Moon – A real, voiceless moon. The moon is not always seen, but it appears every night of the year on Junglie Island, even on Christmas Day.
- Firefly – A minor character who appears every night of the year on Junglie Island. She appears in the episodes "Say Cheese Everyone" and "A Journey To The Moon".

== Episodes ==
1. "First Day at School"
2. "Hide And Seek"
3. "Penny's Little Brother"
4. "Echo Valley"
5. "Albert's Tooth"
6. "Journey To The Moon"
7. "Where's Zoe"
8. "Say Cheese Everyone"
9. "Heavy, Heavy, Heavy"
10. "Down the River"
11. "Flying South"
12. "The Great Storm"
13. "A Very Big Monkey" (this episode was only broadcast and never commercially released)

=== Home video ===
Two VHS releases of the series were released in 1991 and 1992 by Abbey Home Entertainment.

VHS title	Release date	Episodes
Junglies - First Day At School And Other Adventures (95272)	4 November 1991	First Day at School, Penny's Little Brother, Albert's Tooth, Where's Zoe, Heavy, Heavy, Heavy and Flying South
Junglies - Hide and Seek And Other Adventures (95642)	3 August 1992	Hide and Seek, Down the River, Say Cheese, Everyone, Echo Valley, The Great Storm and The Journey to the Moon

== See also ==
- Nellie the Elephant - another programme with similar animation designs, also by Ward.
