= Dial My Number =

Dial My Number may refer to:

- Dial My Number, disco song by R. Bais, 1985
- Dial My Number, disco song by The Back Bag, cover of original by R. Bais, 1986
- Dial My Number, first solo album Pauli Carman, 1986
- Dial My Number, by Carlene Davis, 1992
- "Dial My Number", R&B hit single Pauli Carman
- "Dial My Number", song by Rick Astley from Hold Me in Your Arms
- "Dial My Number", song by Sophie Ellis-Bextor from Make a Scene
