= I Don't Wanna Fight =

1993 single by Tina Turner

Single by Tina Turner

from the album What's Love Got to Do with It
- B-side: "Tina's Wish" (1993 version)
- Released: April 23, 1993
- Studio: Image Recording
- Genre: Dance-pop
- Length: 6:06 (album version); 4:26 (7-inch edit)
- Label: Virgin; Parlophone
- Songwriters: Lulu; Billy Lawrie; Steve DuBerry
- Producers: Chris Lord-Alge; Roger Davies

Tina Turner singles chronology
"(Simply) The Best" (1992)	"I Don't Wanna Fight" (1993)	"Disco Inferno" (1993)

Music video
- "I Don't Wanna Fight" on YouTube

"I Don't Wanna Fight" is a song by American singer and actress Tina Turner, released in April 1993 through Virgin and Parlophone Records. The track was co-written by British singer Lulu, her brother Billy Lawrie, and Steve DuBerry. The song was first offered to singer Sade, who sent it on to Turner. Turner recorded it in 1993 as part of the soundtrack for her autobiographical film, What's Love Got to Do with It. Lulu's version appears as a B-side to her 1993 single "How 'Bout Us" as well as on the 2003 album The Greatest Hits.

Featuring a wistful but resolute vocal set against a synthesizer line, the track was a substantial hit on both sides of the Atlantic, reaching No. 9 on both the US Billboard Hot 100 and Cash Box Top 100, and No. 7 on the UK Singles Chart. In Canada, it peaked at No. 1 for three weeks, and in Iceland, it reached No. 3. The song was nominated at the 36th Grammy Awards for Best Female Pop Vocal Performance and Best Song Written Specifically for a Motion Picture or for Television. It was also awarded one of BMI's Pop Songs Awards in 1994, honoring the songwriters, composers and music publishers of the song. It was Turner's last single to chart in the top ten of the Billboard Hot 100. Its accompanying music video, directed by British director Peter Care, received heavy rotation on MTV Europe in July 1993.

== Critical reception ==
The song received positive reviews from music critics. Larry Flick from Billboard magazine complimented Turner's "distinctive and worldly vocal delivery". He also noted that she makes her Virgin debut "with a shuffling pop/dance ditty" that stylistically lands somewhere between her comeback hit, "Let's Stay Together", and Amy Grant's "Baby Baby". The Daily Vault called "I Don't Wanna Fight" a "cinematic epic", stating that it "shows Turner capable of riding today's wave effortlessly without losing herself in it". Alan Jones from Music Week viewed the song as "a soulful shuffle" that "benefits from rich arrangements and one of Turner's more restrained, though distinctive, vocals." A reviewer from People Magazine described "I Don't Wanna Fight" as an "ardent ballad" that proved that Turner had "mellowed". Sam Wood of Philadelphia Inquirer called the song "overproduced". James Hunter from Vibe stated that "when Turner tears up her voice at the top of the bridge, it's as involving as soulful pop music gets." He concluded, "This is one of the best records of her career".

== Track listings ==
- US 7-inch and cassette single

Japanese CD single

1. "I Don't Wanna Fight" (single edit) – 4:25
2. "Tina's Wish" – 3:08
- European CD, cassette and 7-inch single

UK cassette and 7-inch single
Australian cassette single

1. "I Don't Wanna Fight" (single edit) – 4:25
2. "The Best" (single edit) – 4:08
- European CD and 12-inch single

Australian CD single

1. "I Don't Wanna Fight" (single edit) – 4:25
2. "Tina's Wish" – 3:08
3. "I Don't Wanna Fight" (Urban mix) – 5:17
4. "I Don't Wanna Fight" (Holiday Inn Lounge mix) – 5:43
- UK CD1
1. "I Don't Wanna Fight" (single edit) – 4:25
2. "Tina's Wish" (single edit) – 3:08
3. "I Don't Wanna Fight" (Urban mix) – 5:17
- UK CD2
1. "I Don't Wanna Fight" (single edit) – 4:25
2. "The Best" (single edit) – 4:08
3. "I Don't Wanna Lose You" – 4:20
4. "What's Love Got to Do with It" – 3:48

== Charts ==
=== Weekly charts ===
Weekly chart performance for "I Don't Wanna Fight"
Chart (1993)	Peak position
Australia (ARIA)	39
Austria (Ö3 Austria Top 40)	29
Belgium (Ultratop 50 Flanders)	8
Canada Top Singles (RPM)	1
Canada Adult Contemporary (RPM)	1
Europe (Eurochart Hot 100)	11
Europe (European Hit Radio)	1
Europe Adult Contemporary (ACE Top 25)	1
France (SNEP)	49
Germany (GfK)	35
Iceland (Íslenski Listinn Topp 40)	3
Ireland (IRMA)	14
Israel (Israeli Singles Chart)	9
Italy (Hit Parade)	6
Italy (Musica e dischi)	7
Italy (TV Sorrisi e Canzoni)	6
Netherlands (Dutch Top 40)	18
Netherlands (Single Top 100)	14
New Zealand (Recorded Music NZ)	7
Norway (VG-lista)	8
Sweden (Sverigetopplistan)	39
Switzerland (Schweizer Hitparade)	11
UK Singles (Official Charts)	7
UK Airplay (Music Week)	3
US Billboard Hot 100	9
US Adult Contemporary (Billboard)	1
US Hot R&B/Hip-Hop Songs (Billboard)	51
US Pop Airplay (Billboard)	6
US Rhythmic Airplay (Billboard)	36
US Cash Box Top 100	9

=== Year-end charts ===
Year-end chart performance for "I Don't Wanna Fight"
Chart (1993)	Position
Belgium (Ultratop)	71
Canada Top Singles (RPM)	5
Canada Adult Contemporary (RPM)	1
Europe (Eurochart Hot 100)	92
Europe (European Hit Radio)	5
Iceland (Íslenski Listinn Topp 40)	20
Netherlands (Single Top 100)	96
Switzerland (Schweizer Hitparade)	40
UK Singles (OCC)	84
UK Airplay (Music Week)	30
US Billboard Hot 100	42
US Adult Contemporary (Billboard)	2
US Cash Box Top 100	43
