= List of songs recorded by Brotherhood of Man =

This is a list of songs recorded and released by British pop group Brotherhood of Man.

== 0–9 ==
- 1999

== A ==
- A Better Tomorrow
- Ain't That Tellin' You People
- Alison
- A Little Bit More
- A Little Bit of Heaven
- All By Myself
- All Night
- Always You and I
- Andrea Android
- Andy McDougle
- Angelo
- Annie's Song

== B ==
- Bag of Money
- Beautiful Lover
- Being With You
- Be My Loving Baby
- Better to Have Loved
- The Big Race
- Blame It on the Boogie
- Break Up
- Bright Eyes
- Broken Hearted Avenue
- Brown Girl in the Ring
- Butterfly Ball
- Butterfly Butterfly
- The Butterfly Children
- Butterfly Rock
- Bye Bye One Kiss Goodbye

== C ==
- California Sunday Morning
- Can't Stop Loving You
- Caravan
- Catch Me Catch Me if You Can
- Chanson D'Amour
- Cinderella
- The Circus Came to Town
- Closer Closer
- Copacabana (At the Copa)
- Crazy
- Cross My Heart
- Cry Baby Cry
- Crying
- Cry Thief

== D ==
- D.I.S.C.O.
- Daisy
- Dance Yourself Dizzy
- Dancing Queen
- Daydreamer
- Didn't I Blow Your Mind
- Do Be Do
- Don't Give Up on Us Baby
- Don't Go Breaking My Heart
- Do Ya Think I'm Sexy
- Do Your Thing
- Dream On

== E ==
- Ernie
- Evergreen
- Every Day of My Life

== F ==
- Feels Like I'm in Love
- Figaro
- Finders Keepers
- Following a One Man Band
- Follow Me
- For Old Times Sake
- For the Rest of Our Lives
- For You
- Freedom

== G ==
- Gold
- Goodbye Goodbye
- Goodnight Sleepyhead
- Good Things Happening
- Got a Funny Feeling
- Got to Get You into My Life
- Greatest Love
- Greenhouse
- Guess Who's Taking You Out Tonight
- Gypsy

== H ==
- Hanging On
- Hang On
- Happy Birthday
- Happy Ever After
- Have You Been a Good Boy
- He Ain't Heavy He's My Brother
- Heartbreaker
- He Looked at Me
- Hey D.C.
- Higher Than High
- High on the Thought of You
- Highwayman
- Hi Ho (Together We Go)
- Hip to Be Square
- Honey Don't Throw Our Love Away
- Hot Love
- How 'Bout Us
- How Can You Love
- How Deep Is Your Love

== I ==
- I Could Be So Good for You
- I Don't Need It
- If You Leave Me Now
- I Give You My Love
- I'll Go Where Your Music Takes Me
- I'll Never Let You Down
- I'll Take You Higher Than High
- I Love Everybody
- Images
- I'm Gonna Make You Love Me
- I'm in a Dancing Mood
- I'm Not in Love
- I'm so Much in Love
- In Love
- I Saw Yesterday Today
- Is it Love
- Isn't it Sad / She Looked at Me
- It's Great to Be a Butterfly
- I've Got the Music in Me
- I Wanna Go to Africa
- I Wanna Stay With You
- I Will Survive

== J ==
- Jack the Lad
- Join the Party
- Juke Box Hero
- Jukebox Serenade
- Just When it Seems Impossible

== K ==
- Kiss Me Kiss Your Baby
- Kiss Me Senor
- Knock on Wood

== L ==
- Lady
- Lady Lady Lady Lay
- Lady Liar
- Lay All Your Love On Me
- Le Freak
- Let Me Sleep On It
- Let's Get the Show On the Road
- Let's Love Together
- Light from Your Window
- Lightning Flash
- Live and Let Die
- Living in the Land of Love
- Lonely One
- Love Grows
- Love is a Good Foundation
- Love, Lines, Angles and Rhymes
- Love Me for What I Am
- Love Me Like I Love You
- Love One Another
- Love's Bound to Get Ya
- Lullaby

== M ==
- Maybe the Morning
- Middle of the Night
- Midnight Express
- Miss You Nights
- More Than in Love
- The Moth Ball Spoof
- Moth Gang
- Movin' With Susan
- Much Better than You
- Mull of Kintyre
- My Eyes Adored You
- My Sweet Rosalie

== N ==
- New York City
- Night Fever
- The Night of My Life
- No Smoke Without Fire
- Nothing in the World
- Now

== O ==
- Oh Boy (The Mood I'm In)
- Ole Ole
- One Day at a Time
- One Day I'll Fly Away
- One Night
- Only Love
- Our World of Love

== P ==
- Papa Louis
- Part of My Life
- Penny for Your Thoughts
- People Over the World
- Piece Patrol
- Pop Muzik
- Proud Mary
- Puppy Love
- Put Out the Fire
- Put Your Hand in the Hand

== R ==
- Reach out Your Hand
- Remember You're a Womble
- Ring My Bell
- Rivers of Babylon
- Rock Me Baby
- Roulette
- Run Like Hell

== S ==
- Safety First
- Sailing
- Saturday Night
- Save Your Kisses for Me
- Say a Prayer
- Send in the Clowns
- Shame on You Baby
- Shang a Lang / Bye, Bye, Baby (Baby Goodbye)
- She's Out of My Life
- Shimmy Shimmy Shamay
- Silly Love Songs
- Singing a Song
- Singin' in the Rain
- Sing in the Sunshine
- Sleeping Beauty
- Somebody Else
- Something Wonderful
- Song Sung Blue
- Spring of 1912
- Star
- Stayin' Alive
- Sugar Honey Love
- Sugar Mouse
- Sunshine All the Way
- Sweet Lady from Georgia

== T ==
- Taxi
- Tell Me How
- Tell Me Tell Me Tell Me
- There's a Mountain
- This Boy
- This is the Night
- This World is Ours
- Three Times a Lady
- Tie a Yellow Ribbon
- Together We Are Beautiful
- Tomorrow
- To-night's the Night
- Too Late the Hero
- Too Many Heartaches
- Tragedy
- Tu Eres Bonita
- Tugging
- Two Can Live as Cheap Babe

== U ==
- United We Stand
- Use It Up and Wear It Out

== V ==
- Vanishing Lady

== W ==
- We Can Make It
- We Don't Talk Anymore
- Welcome Sunday Morning
- We’re the Brotherhood of Man
- What More Can I Say
- What's Another Year
- What Would Happen if Christmas Never Came
- When I Need You
- When Love Catches Up On You
- When Summer's Gone
- When the Kissing Stops
- When Will I See You Again
- When You're in Love with a Beautiful Woman
- Where Are You Going to My Love
- Willie
- Will You Love Me Tomorrow
- Wings
- Without You
- With You I'm Born Again
- Woman
- Woman in Love
- Working My Way Back to You
- The World Gets Better With Love

== Y ==
- Y.M.C.A.
- Yes Sir I Can Boogie
- You and I
- You are Love
- You Are What You Are
- You Can Depend on Me
- You Can Say That Again
- You're the Greatest Lover
- You're the One That I Want / Summer Nights
