= Christian Roberts =

Christian Roberts may refer to:

- Christian Roberts (footballer)
- Christian Roberts (actor)
