= Lulu (1981 album) =

Studio album by Lulu
- Released: 1981
- Recorded: 1978, 1981
- Genres: Pop, pop rock
- Label: Alfa
- Producer: Mark London

Lulu chronology
Don't Take Love for Granted (1978)	Lulu (1981)	Take Me to Your Heart Again (1982)

Lulu is an eponymous album released by Lulu on Alfa Records in 1981. It is notable for containing the hit single "I Could Never Miss You (More Than I Do)", which became the second-highest-charting single of Lulu's career in the US, hitting the top 20 on the Billboard Hot 100 and No. 2 on the Adult Contemporary chart in 1981.

== History ==
Alfa Records released the album Lulu in August 1981, in response to the chart success of "I Could Never Miss You (More Than I Do)", originally contained on Lulu's 1978 album, Don't Take Love for Granted. In addition to "I Could Never Miss You (More Than I Do)", Lulu featured two other songs from the 1978 album, being the title track, "Don't Take Love for Granted" and "You Are Still a Part of Me", all of which had been written by Neil Harrison. A new Harrison track, "Can't Hold Out on Love", was included, being one of seven new tracks produced by Mark London.

Despite not charting in the UK, Lulu reached No. 126 on the Billboard albums chart, making it Lulu's third US charting album—her first in eleven years—and her last to date.

"If I Were You", which had been a minor hit (No. 70) for Toby Beau in 1980, was released as the follow-up single to "I Could Never Miss You (More Than I Do)"—with "You Win, I Lose" as the B-side—and became Lulu's final Hot 100 appearance to date, reaching No. 44 (No. 42 Cash Box) in January 1982. It also hit No. 27 on the Adult Contemporary chart. In August 1982, "If I Were You" reached No. 6 in New Zealand.

The track "Who's Foolin' Who," a cover of a 1976 Bobby Bland song, earned Lulu a nomination for Grammy Award for Best Female Rock Vocal Performance. Lulu lost to Pat Benatar.

"Who's Foolin' Who" was released as a single, with "You Win, I Lose" again serving as the B-side, and peaked at No. 6 on the Bubbling Under Hot 100 Singles chart.

== Track listing ==
1. "I Could Never Miss You (More Than I Do)" (Neil Harrison) – 3:08
2. "The Last Time" (Mick Jagger, Keith Richards) – 3:17
3. "If I Were You" (Jerry Fuller, John Hobbs) – 3:13
4. "Loving You" (Jerry Leiber, Mike Stoller) – 4:30
5. "Can't Hold Out on Love" (Neil Harrison) – 3:18
6. "You Win, I Lose" (Arlene Matza, Guy Thomas) – 3:40
7. "Don't Take Love for Granted" (Neil Harrison) – 3:24
8. "Who's Foolin' Who" (Dan Walsh, Michael Price, Steve Barri, Michael Omartian) – 3:36
9. "You Are Still a Part of Me" (Neil Harrison) – 3:16
10. "If You're Right" (Peter Sinfield, Andy Hill) – 3:12

== Personnel ==
- Lulu – vocals
- Ray Russell, Ronnie Caryl – guitar
- Alan Jones, Alan Tarney – bass
- Lynton Naiff, Mike Moran – keyboards, arrangements
- Graham Jarvis, Peter Van Hooke, Trevor Spencer – drums
- Ray Cooper – percussion
- Carol Kenyon, Ronnie Carroll, Tony Rivers – backing vocals

Technical

- Colin Fairley, Jon Kelly – engineers
- Marion London – director
