= Modern Heart =

Modern Heart may refer to:

- Modern Heart (Champaign album), 1983
- Modern Heart (Milow album), 2016
