= Martha Redbone =

American musician (born 1966)

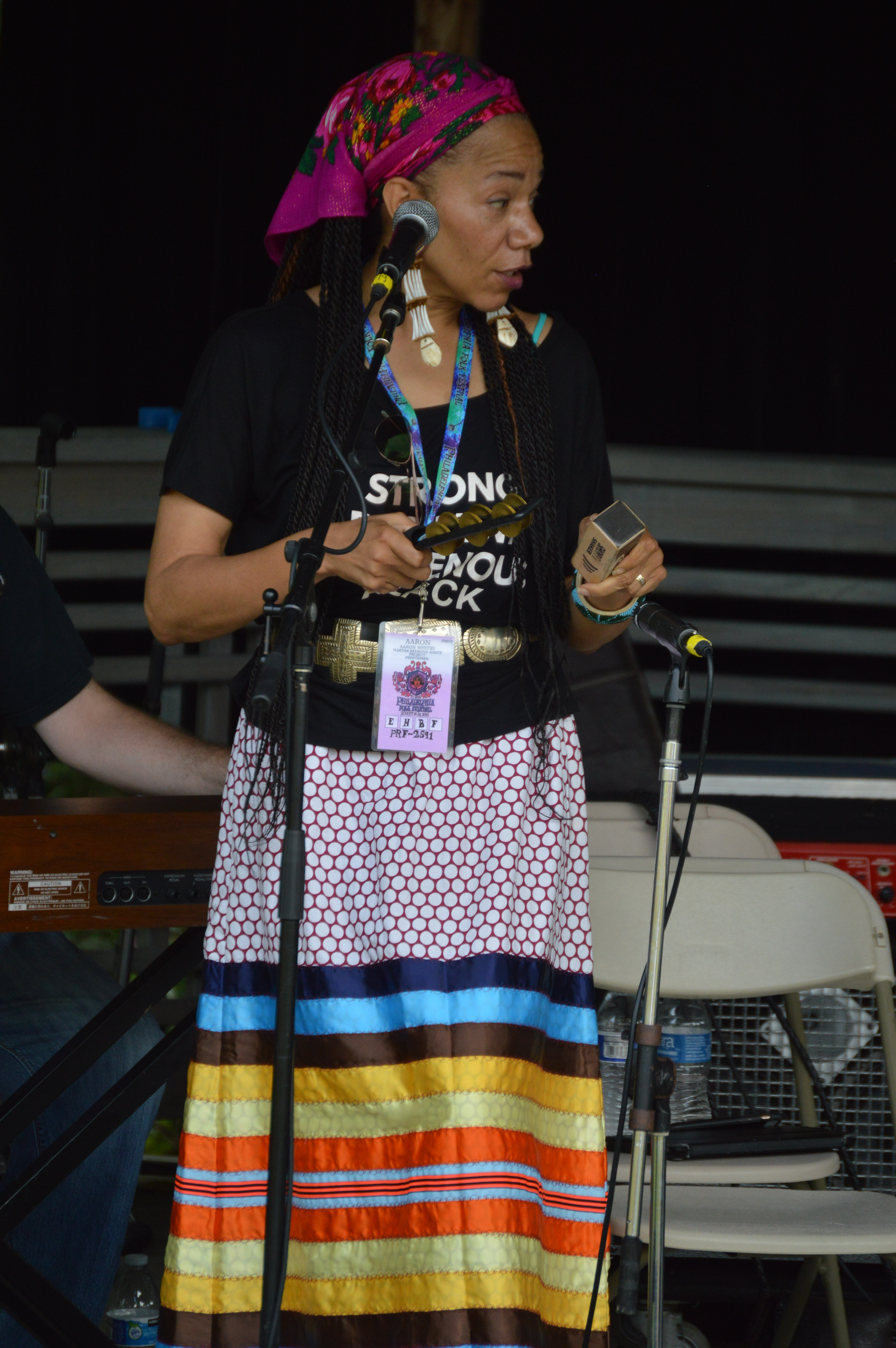

Background information
- Born: New York City
- Origin: New York City, New York, and Kentucky, United States
- Genres: Rhythm and Blues, Folk and Soul
- Occupations: Singer, songwriter, composer
- Years active: 1996–present
- Label: Dome Records
- Website: martharedbone.com

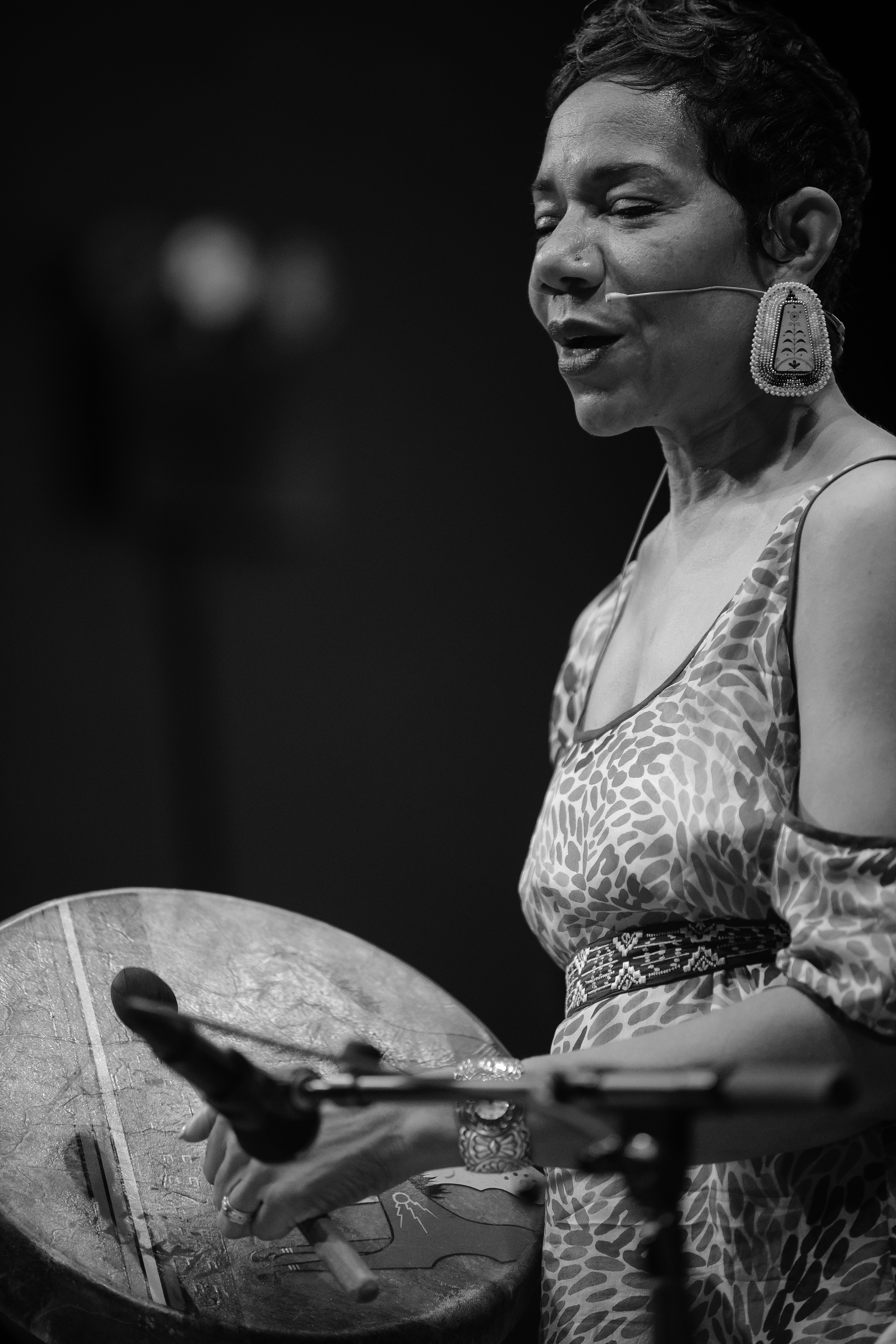
Martha Redbone, Arts for Art - Vision Festival 2024. Photo by Marek Lazarski

Martha Redbone (born 1966) is an American singer known for blending rhythm and blues and soul with elements of Native American music.

== Early life and education ==
Redbone spent time with her maternal grandparents in Harlan County. She self-identifies as Native American, stating that her late mother was a mix of Chickamauga Cherokee, Shawnee, Blackfeet, and Mississippi Choctaw and her late father was African-American and Lumbee from Robeson County, North Carolina. She has never conducted a DNA test, but says she looks like the Igbo people in Nigeria.

== Career ==
Redbone is a musician and singer, her style combining Black and Native American musical elements. Her stage name, "Redbone", comes from Southern slang for people of Black and Native American ancestry. She was mentored in songwriting and music production by Junie Morrison of the Ohio Players and Parliament Funkadelic. In early 2007, Redbone's Skintalk won The 6th Annual Independent Music Awards for Best R&B Album.

Her 2012 work, The Garden of Love – Songs of William Blake, sets Blake's poem of the same name to music that draws from rural influences of Appalachia: English folk, African American, and Native American traditions. She tours nationally with the Martha Redbone Roots Project.

Redbone composed the score for the revival of the late Ntozake Shange's choreopoem For Colored Girls Who Have Considered Suicide / When the Rainbow Is Enuf with her husband and collaborator Aaron Whitby, which premiered on Broadway in 2022. In 2019, they were the composers of the Public Theatre's iteration of the choreo-poem. Redbone and Whitby won a Drama Desk award in 2020 for Outstanding Music in a Play for the original score for "For Colored Girls".

== Personal life ==
Redbone is married to Aaron Whitby, with whom she owns the record label Blackfeet Productions. The couple has a son.

== Discography ==
- Home of the Brave (2001)
- Skintalk (2004)
- Future Street (2006)
- The Garden of Love – Songs of William Blake (2012)
