= David Massey (music executive) =

American record executive

- Born: London, United Kingdom
- Known for: Arista Records (CEO)
- Parent: Marion Massey

David Massey is a British-born, American record executive and former artist manager. Massey previously served as president of Universal Music Group's Mercury Records from 2007 until 2013, when he was named president/CEO of Universal's Island Records.

Massey left Island in June 2018 to be president and CEO of Arista Records as part of a new partnership between Sony Music and Massey. Under Arista Records, Massey established and oversees Work of Art Publishing, Work of Art Management and last nite records, the label's global music and research subsidiary.

== Personal life ==
Massey was born in London to Gerald Massey and Marion Massey. Marion was the manager of British pop star Lulu from the singer's discovery in 1963 until the end of the 1980s, and she is known as one of the first female artist managers in the music industry.

Massey's early schooling was at the Lycée Francais de Londres, followed by a master's degree in law at Christ's College Cambridge University, where he was also president of the Law Society.

He married Gaby Gryn in 1987 and they have two children, Adam and Clio. The family moved to New York City in January 1992, where they continue to reside. He has two grandchildren, Hugo and Una.

== Career ==
Massey began his career in the music industry in 1982 as an artist manager, firstly representing the British new wave group, Wang Chung – who signed with Geffen and enjoyed five US Top 40 singles. His client roster also included Tom Robinson, Hollywood Beyond, Siedah Garrett, and also prolific British songwriter/producers Tony Swain and Steve Jolley. In addition to artist representation, Massey also ran a small independent label and music publishing company called Big World Records. “When I was a manager back in the day,” he tells HITS, “I was always involved in the A&R of my bands. My management company was A&R-driven in terms of our involvement, which is probably why I ended up doing A&R.”

In 1991 Massey left management following the acceptance of an offer from Tommy Mottola and Michele Anthony to join Sony Entertainment as vice-president of A&R at Epic Records, rising to Executive Vice President/General Manager of the label in 1997.

During this time, he worked with Oasis, Silverchair, Shakira, Des'ree, Franz Ferdinand, among others. Massey became Executive Vice President of A&R for Sony Music in 1999, focusing on Global A&R. He also founded and became President of Daylight Records, a Sony imprint and home to such artists as Anastacia, Delta Goodrem, Good Charlotte, The Jonas Brothers, Phantom Planet and Cyndi Lauper.

Massey left Sony in April 2007 to join the Universal Music Group as president of Mercury Records. The label had been dormant in the United States since 1996 and was revived under his leadership. During his time at Mercury Records, the label released albums by Neon Trees, The Wanted, The Gaslight Anthem, Duffy, Portishead, Parachute, Jessie James, and Taio Cruz. Massey also oversaw releases by Island Records artists The Killers and Fall Out Boy.

In February 2013, Massey was appointed to the dual position of President and CEO of Island Records. Recent additions to the Island roster include Avicii, American Authors, Bishop Briggs, Nick Jonas, Tove Lo, Shawn Mendes, Elton John, Mike Posner, and Keke Palmer among others. During Massey's tenure at Island, the label has relaunched the 4th & Broadway imprint to focus on dance music, which includes signings Kiesza, Sam Feldt, and Ansolo.

Since 2013, Massey has served as a trustee for the National Academy of Recording Arts & Sciences.

In 2018, Sony Music CEO Rob Stringer announced Massey would lead the relaunch of Arista Records. Massey developed the relaunch as a model-designed entertainment company - part record label, part publishing and part management. Under Massey's leadership, Arista Records’ roster includes GRAMMY-nominated artist, JP Saxe, Måneskin, Princess Nokia, Tai Verdes, as well as emerging artists such as, KennyHoopla, UPSAHL, carolesdaughter, and Audrey Nuna.

David was recently named one of the "most powerful and influential figures in the music business" by HITS Magazine and has been included on Billboard's Power 100 list for six consecutive years.
