= Try Again (Champaign song) =

Single by Champaign

from the album Modern Heart
- B-side: "International Feel"
- Released: February 1983
- Genre: R&B
- Length: 3:42
- Label: Columbia/CBS Records
- Songwriters: Dana Walden, Rocky Maffitt, Michael Day

Champaign singles chronology
"Can You Find the Time?" / "Whiplash" (1981)	"Try Again" (1983)	"Let Your Body Rock" (1983)

Official video
- "Try Again" on YouTube

"Try Again" is a song by American contemporary R&B group Champaign. Released in February 1983 as the first single from their album Modern Heart, this ballad rose through the Billboard Hot 100 chart in April and May, peaking at number 23 in mid-June.

== Chart history ==
Chart (1983)	Peak position
Jamaica (The Gleaner)	7
US Billboard Hot 100	23
US Billboard R&B	2
US Billboard Adult Contemporary	6

Year-end chart (1983)	Rank
US Top Pop Singles (Billboard)	85

== Personnel ==
- Pauli Carman - lead vocals
- Rena (Jones) Day - backing vocals
- Leon Reeder - guitar
- Michael Reed - bass
- Michael Day - keyboards
- Dana Walden - keyboards
- Rocky Maffitt - drums
