= Andre Barreau =

British guitarist (1956–2023)

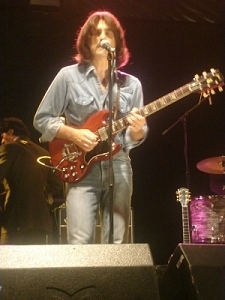
- Barreau performing in 2006

Background information
- Born: 16 April 1956
- Died: 25 August 2023 (aged 67)
- Genres: Pop, rock
- Occupation: Musician
- Instruments: Guitar, bass, vocals
- Years active: 1980–2023
- Formerly of: The Bootleg Beatles

Andre Barreau (16 April 1956 – 25 August 2023) was a British musician who was a member of The Bootleg Beatles, in which he played George Harrison from the group's formation in March 1980 until his departure in 2017. In 1997, Barreau performed the slide guitar solo on Robbie Williams's song "Angels".

== The Bootleg Beatles ==
Following the final show of the West End musical Beatlemania, Barreau formed The Bootleg Beatles with fellow cast members Neil Harrison and David Catlin-Birch. The band invested their dwindling finances in two guitars – an Epiphone and a Gretsch – as well as two Vox amplifiers, four black polo-necks and a wig.

Barreau left the performing lineup of the band in 2017 but continued with the show's production. His death was announced on 25 August 2023.

== Death ==
Andre Barreau died in August 2023, at the age of 67.

== Credits ==
=== Stage ===
- Beatlemania (1979–1980) – George Harrison
- The Bootleg Beatles (1980–2014) – George Harrison, audio visual research, and artistic Director

=== Discography ===
- Le Beat Group Electrique by Wreckless Eric (1989) – Bass guitar
- The Donovan Of Trash by Wreckless Eric (1993) – Bass guitar, backing vocals
- 12 O'Clock Stereo by The Hitsville House Band (1995) – Guitar, backing vocals
- "Angels" by Robbie Williams (1997) – Lead guitar
- "Call Me a Fool" on the original soundtrack for Sliding Doors (1998)
- As I Was Saying by John Howard (2005) – Guitars
- Same Bed, Different Dreams by John Howard (2006) – Guitars
- Dangerous Parking (2007) – Composer
