= Back on Track (Lulu album) =

Studio album by Lulu
- Released: 7 March 2004
- Genre: Pop, Pop rock
- Length: 45:13
- Label: Mercury

Lulu chronology
The Greatest Hits (2003)	Back on Track (2004)	A Little Soul in Your Heart (2005)

Singles from Back on Track
- 1. "All the Love in the World" Released: 2003; 2. "Keep Talkin' I'm Listening" Released: 2004

Professional ratings
Review scores
Source	Rating
Allmusic	4/5 stars

Back on Track is a studio album by Scottish singer Lulu, released 7 March 2004 as a digital download and 15 March 2004 on CD. The album includes the songs "All the Love in the World" and "Keep Talkin' I'm Listening", which were seriously considered as singles (promotional music videos for both were made in advance), but never made it to a single release, as well a new recording of her 2000 single "Where the Poor Boys Dance". With no new single to promote this album, it stalled at no.68 on the UK Albums Chart, despite positive reviews, a tour, and many guest slots from Lulu on television and radio chat shows.

== Track listing ==
No.	Title	Writer(s)	Length
1.	"Keep Talkin' I'm Listening"	Bryan Adams, David Munday, Phil Thornalley	3:44
2.	"Yeah, Now You Love Me"	Lulu, William Lawrie, Colin Campsie, Thornalley	2:55
3.	"Slow Motion"	David Gamson, Oliver Leiber, Craig Northey, Pamela Sheyne	3:53
4.	"Could I Be More Blue?"	Tim Fraser, Manikiza	4:07
5.	"All the Love in the World"	William Lawrie, Jim Marr, Wendy Page	4:16
6.	"Supernatural"	Lulu, William Lawrie, Geri Halliwell, Andy Watkins, Paul Wilson	4:12
7.	"Roll the Dice"	Lulu, William Lawrie, Graham Lyle	3:36
8.	"I Love You Goodbye"	Colin Campsie, Oliver Leiber, Thornalley	3:44
9.	"Time to Fall"	Don Mescall, Martin Sutton	3:30
10.	"Sentimental Heart"	Tina Dickow, Matt Prime	3:05
11.	"(If You Wanna) Kiss and Tell"	Lulu, William Lawrie, Alex Golding, Harriet Roberts	3:40
12.	"Where the Poor Boys Dance" (2004 version)	Lulu, William Lawrie, David Tyson	4:27

== Charts ==
Chart performance for Back on Track
Chart (2004)	Peak position
Scottish Albums (OCC)	36
UK Albums (OCC)	68

== Release history ==
Region	Date	Label	Format	Catalogue
United Kingdom	7 March 2004	Mercury Records	Digital download	
United Kingdom	15 March 2004	Mercury Records	CD	9866136
