= Ansu Kabia =

British actor

- Occupation: Actor
- Years active: 2005–present

Ansu Kabia is a British actor. He attended the Drama Centre London and was a former member of the Royal Shakespeare Company Ensemble. He is best known for his starring role in the British period detective series Miss Scarlet and The Duke as the character Moses.

== Career ==
Early in his career, Kabia starred in the live production of To Sir, With Love, based on E. R. Braithwaite's autographical novel. The 2013 play was adapted by Ayub Khan Din and directed by Mark Babych. Kabia received a positive review from theater critic Michael Billington: "Ansu Kabia is ... outstanding as Ricky. He shows a faintly patrician figure slowly unbending before the less privileged without ever losing his dignity." This was the first time To Sir, With Love was produced as a live performance. E. R. Braithwaite attended the play and called Kabia's performance of Ricky Braithwaite "excellent".

== Filmography ==
Key
†	Denotes film or TV productions that have not yet been released

=== Film ===
Year	Title	Role	Notes
2013	Patriarch	Father	Reggie Yates wrote and directed this 4-minute short film.
2017	Murder on the Orient Express	Police Captain (Newsreel)	
2019	Last Christmas	Rufus	
2019	Fast & Furious Presents: Hobbs & Shaw	UK Newsreader	
2023	The End We Start From	D	
2024	Back to Black	Raye	
2025	Snow White	Huntsman	
TBA	Yeti		Filming

=== Television ===
Year	Title	Role	Notes
2005	Casualty	Kevin Mellor	Episode: "Aftermath"
2006	The Bill	Devon Power	Episode: "A Rock and a Hard Place"
2008	10 Days to War	Charlie	Episode: "A Simple Private Matter"
2011	London's Burning		Television film
2012	Wizards vs. Aliens	Security Man	2 episodes
2014	Utopia	Security Guard	Episode #2.6
2018	The Long Song	James Richards	Miniseries; 2 episodes
2019	World On Fire	Eddie Knight	5 episodes
2020	I May Destroy You	Derae	Episode: "Eyes Eyes Eyes Eyes"
2020–2025	Miss Scarlet and The Duke	Moses Valentine	Main role (series 1–3); guest role (series 6); 19 episodes
2021	The Irregulars	John Cooper	Episode: "Chapter Two: The Ghosts of 221B"
2022	The Sandman	Ruthven Sykes	2 episodes
2023	For Her Sins	Tom Bryant	3 episodes
2024	Lucy & Sara	Bartholomew	Miniseries; episode: "Suicide"
2025	Death in Paradise	Patrick Ambrose	Episode #14.4
2026	Patience	Jimmy Brams	Episode #2.1: "Vampire"

=== Theatre ===
Year	Title	Role	Theatre	Notes
2013	To Sir, With Love	Ricky Braithwaite	Oxford Playhouse	Based on the novel, To Sir, with Love.
2016	Branagh Theatre Live: Romeo and Juliet	Tybalt	Kenneth Branagh Theatre Company	
