= Nairi (disambiguation) =

Nairi, is one of the historical names of Armenia.

Nairi or Nayiri (in Armenian Նայիրի) may also refer to:

== Places ==
- The town of Hatsik, Armavir was called Nairi from 1963 till 1991
- Nairi Cinema, large cinema hall in Yerevan, Armenia

== People ==
- Nairi Grigorian, Spanish pianist of Armenian origin
- Nairi Hunanyan, leader of an armed attack on the Armenian Parliament on October 27, 1999
- Nairi Zarian, Soviet Armenian poet and writer

== Media ==
- Nairi Publishing House, where Ruben Hovsepyan was once editor-in-chief
- Nayiri (periodical) a Beirut-based Armenian-language literary periodical
- Nairi: Tower of Shirin, a 2018 adventure game and visual novel

== Sports ==
- Alashkert Stadium in Yerevan, Armenia, known as Nairi Stadium until 2013
- Nairi SC, Yerevan-based Armenian football club

== Others ==
- Nairi (computer), a Soviet Armenian computer
- Nairi brandy by Yerevan Brandy Company

== See also ==
- Nairi (Armenian usages), an informal synonym for Armenia, which in turn gave rise to a number of modern usages
- Ngaire (disambiguation), including the names Ngaire and Nyree, pronounced similarly to Nairi
