= The Bootleg Beatles =

Beatles tribute band

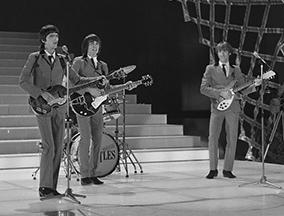
- The Bootleg Beatles performing on the Dutch television programme Showbizzquiz on 14 October 1981

Background information
- Origin: London, England
- Genre: Rock music
- Years active: 1980–present
- Members: Paul Canning; Miles Frizzell; Stephen Hill; Gordon Elsmore
- Past members: Steve White; Tyson Kelly; Adam Hastings; Hugo Degenhardt; Andre Barreau; David Catlin-Birch; Neil Harrison; Rick Rock; Paul Cooper; Jack Lee Elgood
- Website: BootlegBeatles.com

The Bootleg Beatles are a Beatles tribute band. They have performed over 4,000 times since their establishment in March 1980.

== History ==
The Bootleg Beatles were formed by Andre Barreau, Neil Harrison and David Catlin-Birch, fellow London cast members of Beatlemania, following the final show of the West End musical. The band invested in Epiphone and Gretsch guitars and two Vox amplifiers, four black polo-necks, and a wig.

Their first performance was at a small student gathering in Tiverton, Devon, England. Following more low-profile gigs, the band performed a 60-date tour of the Soviet Union; further tours followed in Israel (1982 and 1986), the Far East, and India. In February 1984, they were invited to perform in the United States, to commemorate The Beatles' initial US tour 20 years earlier.

UK success continued to prove elusive. In 1990, the Bootleg Beatles booked 10 shows in cities in which the Beatles had performed in their final UK tour in 1965. A second tour the following year proved more popular. Finally, a gig in Southampton caught the attention of Oasis, leading to the Bootleg Beatles supporting Oasis at Earls Court and Knebworth. This gave the band a contemporary audience and led to appearances on the European festival circuit.

On 30 January 1999, the band played on the rooftop of 3 Savile Row, London, where the Beatles performed on the building's roof in 1969. In 2009 the band hoped to mark the 40th anniversary by recreating the performance again, but health and safety concerns prevented the appearance.

In 2002, the band played at Elizabeth II's Golden Jubilee Party at Buckingham Palace.

In 2010 the band made their first headline appearance on the Acoustic Stage at Glastonbury Festival. They also made a number of appearances on BBC television, including The One & Only, The One Show and I'm in a Rock'n'Roll Band, as well as on the Chris Evans Breakfast Show.

Founder member Neil Harrison left the band in 2011, and was replaced by Adam Hastings. It was announced in September 2012 that longtime member David Catlin-Birch was leaving the group. He was replaced by Steve White.

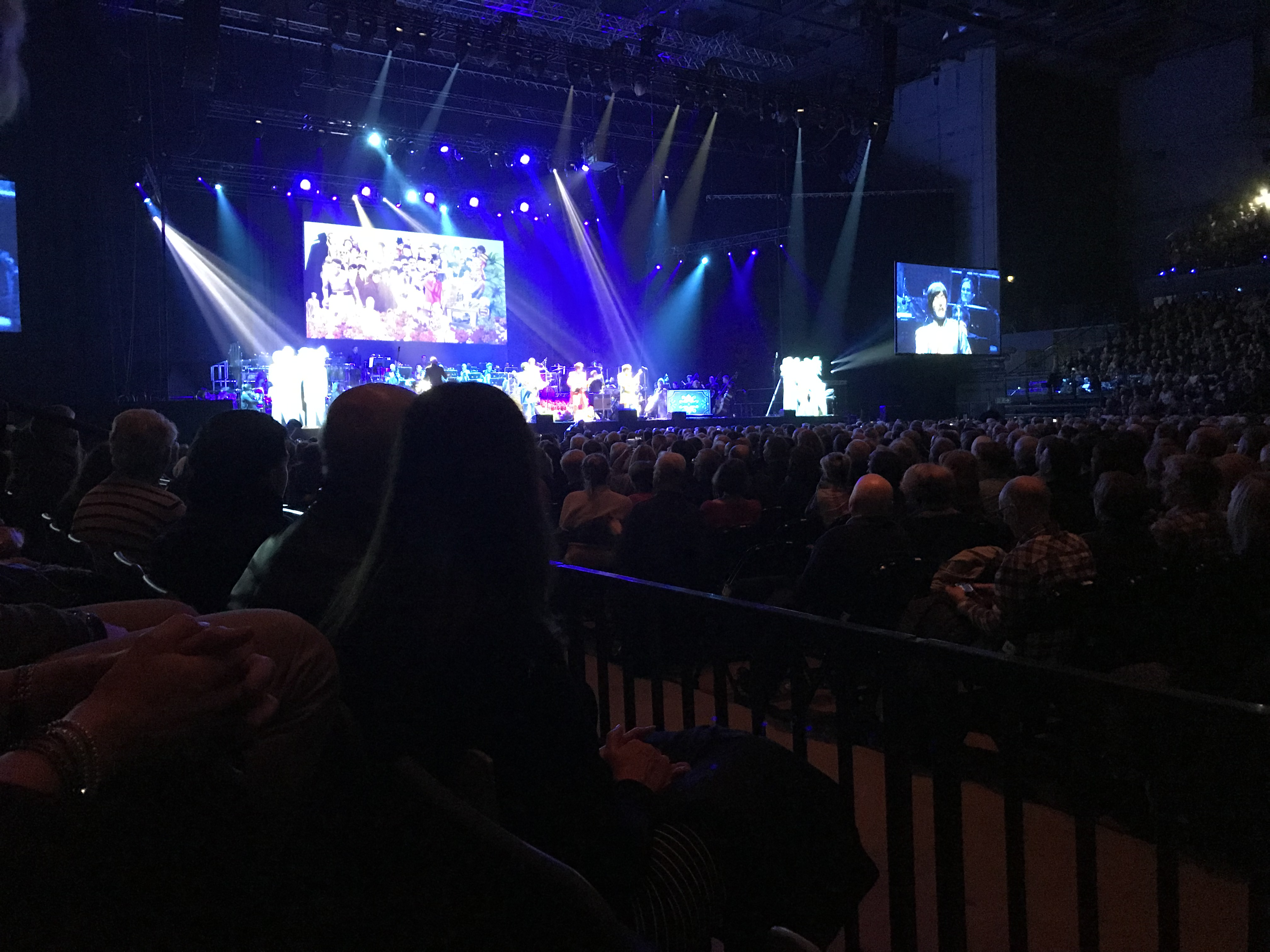
Bootleg Beatles with Royal Liverpool Philharmonic Orchestra at the Echo Arena stadium, Liverpool. (13 January 2018)

The band returned to the Acoustic Stage at Glastonbury in 2013, Andre Barreau, the last of the founding members, retired from the band following their performance at Hyde Park in London on 13 July 2014.

In 2017, Nigel Osborne (Edinburgh University) was commissioned by the Royal Liverpool Philharmonic Orchestra to arrange Sgt. Pepper's Lonely Hearts Club Band for concerts with the Bootleg Beatles, who performed to capacity crowds at the Royal Albert Hall and Echo Arena Liverpool.

The band made their third appearance on the Acoustic Stage at Glastonbury in 2023, and in 2024 performed at the Isle of Wight Festival, before returning to Glastonbury to perform on the Acoustic Stage at Glastonbury 2024. They performed at Cruz Beckham's 21st birthday party on 15 February 2026.

== Meeting the Beatles ==
Their first meeting was in 1996 at David Gilmour's 50th birthday party. Gilmour booked both the Bootleg Beatles and the Australian Pink Floyd Show as he had "always wanted to have the Beatles support Pink Floyd". George Harrison was in the audience and quipped "you probably know the chords better than I do" and "Where's the Bootleg Brian Epstein? 'Cos he's got all the money!"

The second meeting was at the Party at the Palace for the Golden Jubilee of Elizabeth II in 2002, where McCartney headlined.

== Band members ==
Current members

- Paul Canning (John Lennon) – guitar, vocals, keyboards, harmonica (2024–present)
- Miles Frizzell (Paul McCartney) – bass, vocals, keyboards (2025–present)
- Stephen Hill (George Harrison) – guitar, vocals (2014–present)
- Gordon Elsmore (Ringo Starr) – drums, percussion, vocals (2016–present)

Former members

- Steve White (Paul McCartney) - bass, vocals, keyboards (2012–2025)
- Tyson Kelly (John Lennon) – guitar, vocals, keyboards, harmonica (2018–2024)
- Adam Hastings (John Lennon) – guitar, vocals, keyboards, harmonica (2011–2018)
- Hugo Degenhardt (Ringo Starr) – drums, percussion, vocals (2003–2016)
- Andre Barreau (George Harrison) – guitar, vocals (1980–2017; died 2023)
- David Catlin-Birch (Paul McCartney) – bass, vocals, keyboards (1980–1987, 2001–2012)
- Neil Harrison (John Lennon) – guitar, vocals, keyboards (1980–2011)
- Rick Rock (Ringo Starr) – drums, percussion, vocals (1981–2003)
- Paul Cooper (Paul McCartney) – bass, vocals, keyboards (1987–2001; died 2024)
- Jack Lee Elgood (Ringo Starr) – drums, percussion, vocals (1980–1981; deceased)

Orchestra and other musicians

- Max Langley – keyboards, percussion
- Matt Grocutt – trumpet, piccolo trumpet, percussion
- Vanessa King – French horn, flute, vocals, percussion
- Harriet Baker – flute, saxophone
- Chris Cole – trombone
- Tom Bott – violin, swarmandal
- Sarah Chapman – viola
- Sheila Holdsworth – viola
- Robert Woollard – cello, fireman's bell

Timeline
