= Where the Poor Boys Dance =

Single by Lulu
- Released: 2000
- Genre: Pop, dance
- Label: Mercury
- Songwriters: Lulu; Billy Lawrie; David Tyson
- Producer: David Tyson

Lulu singles chronology
"Better Get Ready" (2000)	"Where the Poor Boys Dance" (2000)	"Phunk Phoolin'" (2002)

"Where the Poor Boys Dance" is a song originally recorded by Lulu. It was released as a single from her later cancelled dance album and reached number 24 on the UK singles chart in March 2000. A new version of the song was included on her album Back on Track, released in 2004. The song was later recorded by Daryl Braithwaite and has been included as the first track on his 2005 album, Snapshot.

== Track listing ==
No.	Title	Writer(s)	Length
1.	"Where the Poor Boys Dance" (Almighty mix)	Lulu, Billy Lawrie, David Tyson	3:53
2.	"Better Get Ready"	Lulu, Lawrie, Paul Barry	3:44
3.	"Hurt Me So Bad" (Almighty mix)	Lulu, Lawrie, Tyson	3:54

== Official versions ==
- Album version (unreleased)
- Almighty mix – 3:53
- 2004 version – 4:27 (Back on Track album version)

== Charts ==
Chart (2000)	Peak position
UK Singles Chart	24
Europe (Eurochart Hot 100)	84
