= Christian Roberts (actor) =

British actor (1944–2022)

- Born: 17 March 1944
- Died: 26 December 2022 (aged 78)

Christian Charles Roberts (17 March 1944 – 26 December 2022) was a British actor, best remembered for playing the rebellious Bert Denham, his debut film role, in the 1967 movie To Sir, with Love starring Sidney Poitier.

Roberts was born in Southmoor, Oxfordshire. He was educated at Cranleigh School, Surrey, before attending the Royal Academy of Dramatic Art.

While he has several screen appearances, his acting career was primarily based in theatre. Roberts starred in the late 1960s cult science-fiction show UFO, playing the hippie-turned-alien spy in the final episode "The Long Sleep".

Roberts died of cancer on 26 December 2022, at the age of 78.

== Partial filmography ==
Year	Title	Role	Notes
1966	Theatre 625	Hakon	2 episodes
1967	To Sir, with Love	Bert Denham	
1968	The Anniversary	Tom Taggart	
1968	Twisted Nerve	Philip Harvey	
1969	The Desperados	Adam Galt	
1970	The Adventurers	Robert	
1970	The Mind of Mr. Soames	Thomas Fleming	
1970	The Berlin Affair	Albert	
1971	The Last Valley	Andreas	
1972	Clochemerle	Hippolyte Foncimagne	6 episodes
1972	Timanfaya (amor prohibido)	Young Man	
1976	Short Ends	Policeman	Short film
1991	Streetwise	Mr. Allen	1 episode
1992	The Bill	Bob Cheetham	Episode: "Safety First"
