= How 'Bout Us =

1981 studio album by Champaign

Studio album by Champaign
- Released: 1981
- Studios: Universal Recording Studio (Chicago, Illinois)
- Genre: R&B
- Length: 35:31
- Label: Columbia
- Producer: Leo Graham

Champaign chronology
How 'Bout Us (1981)	Modern Heart (1983)

Singles from How 'Bout Us
- 1. "How 'Bout Us" Released: February 14, 1981; 2. "I'm on Fire"/"Spinnin'" Released: 1981; 3. "Can You Find the Time?"/"Whiplash" Released: 1981

Professional ratings
Review scores
Source	Rating
AllMusic	3/5 stars

How 'Bout Us is the debut studio album by American rhythm and blues group Champaign, released in 1981 via Columbia Records. The album peaked at number 53 on the Billboard 200; and its single of the same name peaked at number 12 on the Billboard Hot 100.

== Track listing ==
No.	Title	Writer(s)	Length
1.	"Can You Find the Time?"	Gary Mackey; Danny McLane	4:05
2.	"Party People"	Tony Craig; Terry Shaddick	5:02
3.	"Whiplash"	Michael Day	3:37
4.	"I'm on Fire"	Barry Ruff; Gene Avaro; Renee Ruff	4:19
5.	"How 'Bout Us"	Dana Walden	4:35
6.	"Spinnin'"	Rena Jones; Rocky Maffit	3:16
7.	"Dancin' Together Again"	Richard Reicheg	3:15
8.	"Lighten Up"	Pauli Carman; Michael Day	3:17
9.	"If One More Morning"	Dana Walden	4:05
Total length:			35:31

== Personnel ==
Champaign

- Pauli Carman – lead vocals
- Michael Day – keyboards, guitars, vocals
- Dana Walden – keyboards, synthesizers
- Leon Howard Reeder – guitars, vocals
- Michael Reed – bass
- Rocky Maffit – percussion, vocals
- Rena Jones – vocals

Additional musicians

- Paul Richmond – bass
- Morris Jennings – drums
- Tommy Radke – Syndrums
- Ken Soderblom – alto sax solo (5)
- Leo Graham – rhythm arrangements
- James Mack – horn, rhythm and string arrangements

=== Production ===
- Leo Graham – producer
- James Mack – co-producer
- Stuart Walder – engineer
- Michael Ferraro – assistant engineer
- Tom Miller – assistant engineer
- Wally Traugott – mastering at Capitol Mastering (Hollywood, California)
- Nancy Donald – design

== Charts ==
=== Weekly charts ===
Chart (1981)	Peak position
Australian Albums (Kent Music Report)	83
Dutch Albums (Album Top 100)	1
New Zealand Albums (RMNZ)	30
UK Albums (Official Charts)	38
US Billboard 200	53

=== Year-end charts ===
Chart (1981)	Position
Dutch Albums (Album Top 100)	24
