= Nellie the Elephant (TV series) =

- Genre: Children's television series
- Created by: Terry Ward
- Written by: Bernie Kay; Richard Everett
- Directed by: Terry Ward
- Voices of: Lulu; Tony Robinson
- Narrated by: Tony Robinson
- Theme music composer: Ralph Butler; Peter Hart
- Opening theme: "Nellie the Elephant" performed by Lulu
- Ending theme: Nellie the Elephant" performed by Lulu
- Composer: John Hyde (incidental music)
- Country of origin: United Kingdom
- Original language: English
- No. of seasons: 2
- No. of episodes: 30

Production
- Producer: Terry Ward
- Production location: UK
- Editor: Morgan Daniels Ltd
- Running time: 5 minutes
- Production companies: 101 Film Productions Limited; Flicks Films

Original release
- Network: ITV
- Release: 8 January – 19 December 1990

Nellie the Elephant is a British children's animated television series created by Terry Ward and produced by Flicks Films and 101 Film Productions Limited, and ran on ITV from 8 January to 19 December 1990. The series featured Lulu as the voice of Nellie, with Tony Robinson providing other voices and also narrating the series. A hardback comic-book annual was released in 1990 in an attempt to further advertise the series, but failed to attract a wide audience.

== Plot ==
Based on the famous children's song, "Nellie the Elephant", the series revolves around a pink elephant named Nellie who is returning to her home in Mandalay after escaping from the circus. Throughout the series, she meets new characters and sometimes returns to the same places in her quest to return home, though curiously, all of her travels are within the United Kingdom.

Another recurring character is a Dick Dastardly-esque ringmaster keen to recapture Nellie at all costs and return her to the circus, but is continuously foiled by Nellie and her friends.

== Characters ==
- Nellie – A young pink Asian Elephant who is the protagonist of the series with a fondness for currant buns (which sometimes proves to be her undoing), Nellie escaped from the circus in an effort to return to Mandalay at all costs, travelling by train, taxi, bus, coach, plane and ship. Keen to help, Nellie is proud of her home and will stand up for her rights if need be.
- The Head of the Herd – An elderly dark grey Asian Elephant with one missing tusk who, as his title suggests, is the leader of the herd. Every episode ends with him making his special sound from far, far away, which can usually be heard floating on the breeze and drifting in the wind, calling for Nellie to come back home. Unlike Nellie, he doesn't speak, and just trumpets like real elephants would.
- Captain Jack – A sea captain from the fictitious Oyster Bay, Captain Jack is the captain of a small tugboat called The Jungle Queen, and is accompanied by his one-eyed pet parrot, Nelson.
- Mr. Mack and Mr. Tosh – A play on Mackintosh (and perhaps a reference to the Goofy Gophers), Mr. Mack and Mr. Tosh are two tailors who share a shop in Oyster Bay that Nellie constantly returns to.
- The Ringmaster – A Dick Dastardly sort of villain, the ringmaster is the owner of the Circus Nellie escaped from, but his villainous traits and reasons for recapturing Nellie are never expanded on in any great detail. He tracks Nellie down in a town in "Nellie at the Big Store", the penultimate episode of the series and is dangerously close to catching her but she is able to flee in a hot air balloon with the help of two balloon sellers.
- Farmer Styles – A farmer who Nellie encounters on her journey. In the episode "Nellie Visits a Farm", she helps him find a stray sheep and he and his wife reward her with a large feast. Farmer Styles reappears in the episodes "Nellie on A Snowy Day", when Nellie assists him after a snowstorm, and "Nellie and the Burning Farm", when his barn catches alight and Nellie helps extinguish the blaze.
- Sergeant Boot - The police sergeant of the village near the Styles farm who appears in the episode "Nellie on a Snowy Day", who Nellies tries to help get his car out of a snowbank and is unsuccessful at first but is able to later clear the snow.
- Captain Match – The chief of the fire brigade in the neighbouring village to the Styles farm. By the time he arrives to tackle the blaze, Nellie has already extinguished it. He appears again in the episode "Nellie Rescues Mrs Maple's Moggy" when Mrs Maple's cat, Tiger, needs rescuing from a high telephone wire and Nellie is on hand to help him.
- The Bluebell Patrol – A group of girl scouts who Nellie encounters in the series' first episode, "Nellie and the Ghost". They are initially afraid of Nellie at first, but warm to her and convince their Scoutmistress, Miss Nettle, to let Nellie stay with their troop.

== Episodes ==
=== Series 1 (1990) ===
- Nellie and the Ghost (8 January 1990)
- Nellie Visits a Farm (15 January 1990)
- Nellie Goes to Sea (22 January 1990)
- Nellie on a Snowy Day (29 January 1990)
- Nellie at the Seaside (5 February 1990)
- Nellie's Raincoat (12 February 1990)
- Nellie and the Whale (19 February 1990)
- Nellie and the Burning Farm (26 February 1990)
- Nellie Takes a Jumbo Jet (5 March 1990)
- Nellie the Theatre Star (12 March 1990)
- Nellie and the Haunted House (19 March 1990)
- Nellie and the Park Disco (26 March 1990)
- Nellie at the Fun Fair (2 April 1990)
- Nellie Rescues Mrs Maple's Moggy (9 April 1990)

=== Series 2 (1990) ===
- Nellie Goes Ballooning (5 September 1990)
- Nellie Goes to the Moon (12 September 1990)
- Nellie Goes Swimming (19 September 1990)
- Nellie and the Flying Saucer (26 September 1990)
- Nellie and the Mystery Tour (3 October 1990)
- Nellie and the Brass Band (10 October 1990)
- Nellie at the Big Store (17 October 1990)
- Nellie Joins the Team (24 October 1990)
- Nellie Visits a Library (31 October 1990)
- Nellie on an Ocean Cruise (7 November 1990)
- Nellie Goes Time Travelling (14 November 1990)
- Nellie Goes Apple Picking (21 November 1990)
- Nellie at the Olympics (28 November 1990)
- Nellie Goes to Peanut Junction (5 December 1990)
- Nellie the Ski Champion (12 December 1990)
- Nellie Takes the Train (19 December 1990)

== Broadcast ==
Nellie the Elephant first aired on ITV on 8 January 1990, starting off with the first 14 episodes of the first series. The second series aired on 5 September of the same year, beginning with the next thirteen episodes, and followed by the last three from 8 January to 19 December 1990, both as part of ITV's Children's ITV programming strand.

The rights to the series were sold to FilmFair following their sale by Central to the Storm Group in 1991.

== Home media releases ==
=== VHS ===
The series saw several VHS releases by Abbey Home Entertainment, all under the Tempo Video label.

- Nellie the Elephant: 9 Fun Packed Adventures (93742) – Released: 1990

Episodes contained:
- "Nellie and the Ghost"
- "Nellie Visits a Farm"
- "Nellie Goes to Sea"
- "Nellie on a Snowy Day"
- "Nellie at the Seaside"
- "Nellie's Raincoat"
- "Nellie the Theatre Star"
- "Nellie and the Haunted House"
- "Nellie Rescues Mrs Maple's Moggy"

- Nellie the Elephant 2: 9 Further Adventures (94182) – Released: 1990

Episodes contained:
- "Nellie and the Whale"
- "Nellie Takes the Train"
- "Nellie Goes Apple Picking"
- "Nellie at the Park Disco"
- "Nellie at the Olympics"
- "Nellie at the Big Store"
- "Nellie at the Funfair"
- "Nellie Takes a Jumbo Jet"
- "Nellie and the Burning Barn"

NOTE: This VHS was re-released in 1999 by Channel 5 Video (a division of Polygram Video) as 9 Fantastic Adventures (0518363) and was re-released again in 2002 by Universal Pictures Home Entertainment as Nellie and the Whale and other stories (9068453).

- Nellie the Elephant: Special Edition (95012) – Released: 1991

Episodes contained:
- "Nellie and the Flying Saucer"
- "Nellie and the Ghost"
- "Nellie and the Whale"
- "Nellie Goes to Peanut Junction"
- "Nellie on a Snowy Day"
- "Nellie Goes Apple Picking"
- "Nellie Goes Ballooning"
- "Nellie and the Haunted House"
- "Nellie Takes a Jumbo Jet"
- "Nellie Goes to Sea"
- "Nellie at the Olympics"
- "Nellie Goes Time Travelling"

- Nellie the Elephant: Nellie Goes to the Moon (95242) – Released: 1991

Episodes contained:
- "Nellie Goes to the Moon"
- "Nellie at the Library"
- "Nellie Goes to Peanut Junction"
- "Nellie Visits a Farm"
- "Nellie at the Park Disco"

- Nellie the Elephant: Nellie on an Ocean Cruise (95502) – Released: 1991

Episodes contained:
- "Nellie on an Ocean Cruise"
- "Nellie and the Brass Band"
- "Nellie the Ski Champion"
- "Nellie Goes Swimming"
- "Nellie Joins the Team"
- "Nellie at the Seaside"
- "Nellie at the Big Store"
- "Nellie Goes Ballooning"

==== Australia ====
- Roadshow Entertainment (1999–2001)

VHS title	Release date	Episodes
Nellie the Elephant – Nellie and the Whale (101006)	14 June 1999	Nellie and the Ghost, Nellie Visits a Farm, Nellie Goes to Sea, Nellie on a Snowy Day, Nellie at the Seaside, Nellie's Raincoat and Nellie and the Whale
Nellie the Elephant – Nellie Goes Apple Picking (102004)	8 May 2000	Nellie on an Ocean Cruise, Nellie Goes Apple Picking, Nellie at the Olympics, Nellie Goes to Peanut Junction and Nellie the Ski Champion
Nellie the Elephant – Nellie Goes Time Travelling (102005)	14 March 2001	Nellie Takes the Train, Nellie and the Mystery Tour, Nellie at the Big Store and Nellie Goes Time Travelling

=== DVDs ===
In 2006 and 2007, two DVDs of Nellie the Elephant were released by Abbey Home Media (as part of its 'Tempo TV Classics' range), with ten episodes each on the DVDs.

- Nellie the Elephant: Nellie and the Ghost (AHEDVD3161) – Released: 2006

Episodes contained:
- "Nellie and the Ghost"
- "Nellie Visits a Farm"
- "Nellie Goes to Sea"
- "Nellie on a Snowy Day"
- "Nellie Goes to the Seaside"
- "Nellie's Raincoat"
- "Nellie and the Whale"
- "Nellie and the Burning Barn"
- "Nellie Takes a Jumbo Jet"
- "Nellie the Theatre Star"

- Nellie the Elephant: Nellie and the Haunted House (AHEDVD3216) – Released: 2007

Episodes contained:
- "Nellie and the Haunted House"
- "Nellie at the Park Disco"
- "Nellie at the Funfair"
- "Nellie Rescues Mrs Maple's Moggy"
- "Nellie Goes Ballooning"
- "Nellie Goes to the Moon"
- "Nellie Goes Swimming"
- "Nellie and the Flying Saucer"
- "Nellie and the Brass Band"
- "Nellie Joins the Team"
