= To Sir, With Love (novel) =

1959 autobiographical novel by E. R. Braithwaite

- First edition
- Author: E. R. Braithwaite
- Language: English
- Genre: Autobiographical novel
- Publisher: Bodley Head
- Publication date: 1959
- Publication place: United Kingdom
- Media type: Print
- Pages: 200 pp (paperback)
- Awards: 1961 Anisfield-Wolf Book Award

To Sir, With Love is a 1959 autobiographical novel by E. R. Braithwaite set in the East End of London. The novel is based on the true story of Braithwaite accepting a teaching post in a secondary school. The novel, in 22 chapters, gives insight into the politics of race and class in postwar London.

In 1967, the novel was made into a film of the same name starring Sidney Poitier and Judy Geeson. The film's title song sung by Lulu became a U.S. No. 1 hit that year. The setting for the film was updated from post-war London to the "swinging sixties". Notwithstanding its success, Braithwaite had ambivalent feelings towards the film, as he admitted in an interview with Burt Caesar conducted for a 2007 BBC Radio 4 programme entitled To Sir, with Love Revisited (produced by Mary Ward Lowery). Also in 2007, the novel was dramatised for Radio 4 by Roy Williams and broadcast in two parts, starring Kwame Kwei-Armah.

To Sir, With Love was included on the "Big Jubilee Read" list of 70 books by Commonwealth authors, selected to celebrate the Platinum Jubilee of Elizabeth II in June 2022.

In 2013, Ayub Khan Din adapted To Sir, With Love for the stage as part of Royal & Derngate, Northampton's Made In Northampton season. The play was directed by Mark Babych and starred Ansu Kabia in the title role and Matthew Kelly. This was the first theatre-adoption of the book.

== Plot ==
Ricky Braithwaite is a black engineer from British Guiana who has worked in an oil refinery in Aruba. Coming to Britain just before the outbreak of World War II, he joins the RAF and is assigned to aircrew. Demobbed in 1945, he is unable to find work despite his qualifications and experience due to racism. After discussing his situation with a stranger, he applies for a teaching position and is assigned to Greenslade Secondary School in London's East End.

Most of the pupils in his class are unmotivated to learn, and are only semi-literate and semi-articulate. He persists despite their unresponsiveness to his approach. Students attempt to discourage and demoralise him by disruptive noises, constant use of the adjective "bleeding" in the classroom and, finally, the burning of a used sanitary towel in the fireplace. This last causes Braithwaite to lose his temper and reprimand all the girls.

Braithwaite decides to try a new approach, and sets some ground rules. The students will be leaving school soon and will enter adult society, so he will treat them as adults and allow them to decide what topics they wish to study. In return, he demands their respect as their teacher. This novel approach is initially rejected, but within a few weeks the class is largely won over. He suggests out-of-school activities including visits to museums, which the students have never experienced before. A young teacher, Gillian Blanchard, volunteers to assist him on these trips. Some of the girls start to speculate whether a personal relationship is budding between Braithwaite and Gillian. The trip is a success and more are approved by the initially sceptical headmaster.

The teachers and the Student Council openly discuss all matters affecting the school including curricula. The general feeling is that Braithwaite's approach is working, although some teachers advocate a tougher approach.

The mother of one of the girls speaks privately to Braithwaite about the girl's troubling attraction to nightlife, feeling that he has more influence with her impressionable daughter.

Braithwaite and Gillian fall deeply in love and discuss marriage. Her parents are openly disapproving of a mixed-race marriage, but realise that the couple are serious and intelligent and must be trusted to make the right decision.

== Criticism ==
In a review of several of Braithwaite's books, F. M. Birbalsingh wrote:

Unfortunately, the narration of Mr. Braithwaite's problems in To Sir, With Love is greatly weakened by the rapid and simple solutions that he offers [...] As his frequent acceptance of glowing tribute from admiring colleagues suggests, what chiefly concerns Mr. Braithwaite, regardless of the problems at hand, is the satisfactory projection of his own image as a rather talented and thoroughly civilised black man. [...] All that To Sir, With Love really achieves is a sordid demonstration of the author's vanity. Nor is his description of specifically racial problems any more discerning. Mr. Braithwaite is shocked when refused social status equal to a Briton with academic qualifications and level of conduct similar to his own; and he constantly stresses the ease with which he could assimilate into British society if only his colour were disregarded [...] Prejudice against him is unfair, he claims, because of his social accomplishment, not because of his humanity; and he implies thereby that prejudice against black people who lack similar cultural habits may be justified.

== Related works ==
Alfred Gardner self-published An East End Story, in which he recalls being a pupil of Braithwaite.

The novel has been compared with the 2011 novel To Miss With Love by Katharine Birbalsingh. Beyond the similar title, both novels have autobiographic elements about teaching in working-class London. Birbalsingh, of Guyanese heritage herself, introduces a Guyanese boy character as an apparent nod to Braithwaite.
