= Ngaire (album) =

Studio album by Ngaire
- Released: June 1, 1991
- Recorded: Auckland, New Zealand (1990-1991)
- Genre: Funk / Soul
- Label: Southside Records; Festival Records
- Producer: Simon Lynch

Ngaire is a self-titled debut album by New Zealand singer Ngaire Fuata. It was released in 1991.

== Track listing ==
1. "Son of a Preacher Man" (John Hurley, Ronnie Wilkins)
2. "When The Feeling Has Gone" (Simon Lynch)
3. "To Sir with Love" (Don Black, Mark London)
4. "Make Up Your Mind" (Simon Lynch)
5. "Attitude" (Murray Cammick, Simon Lynch)
6. "I'm Naming Names" (L. White, Simon Lynch)
7. "Turn It Around" (Simon Lynch)
8. "Give Me A Chance" (Ngaire Fuata, Simon Lynch)
9. "Cruel Time" (L. White, Simon Lynch)
10. "You Got Everything" (Simon Lynch)

== Personnel ==
- Backing Vocals – Margaret Antonovich, Maryanne Antonovich
- Co-producer, Guitar, Backing Vocals – Tony T Nogotautama
- Engineer – Mark Tierney
- Photography By – Kerry Brown
- Producer, Keyboards, Drum Programming – Simon Lynch
- Saxophone – Walter Bianco
