= E. R. Braithwaite =

Guyanese writer (1912–2016)

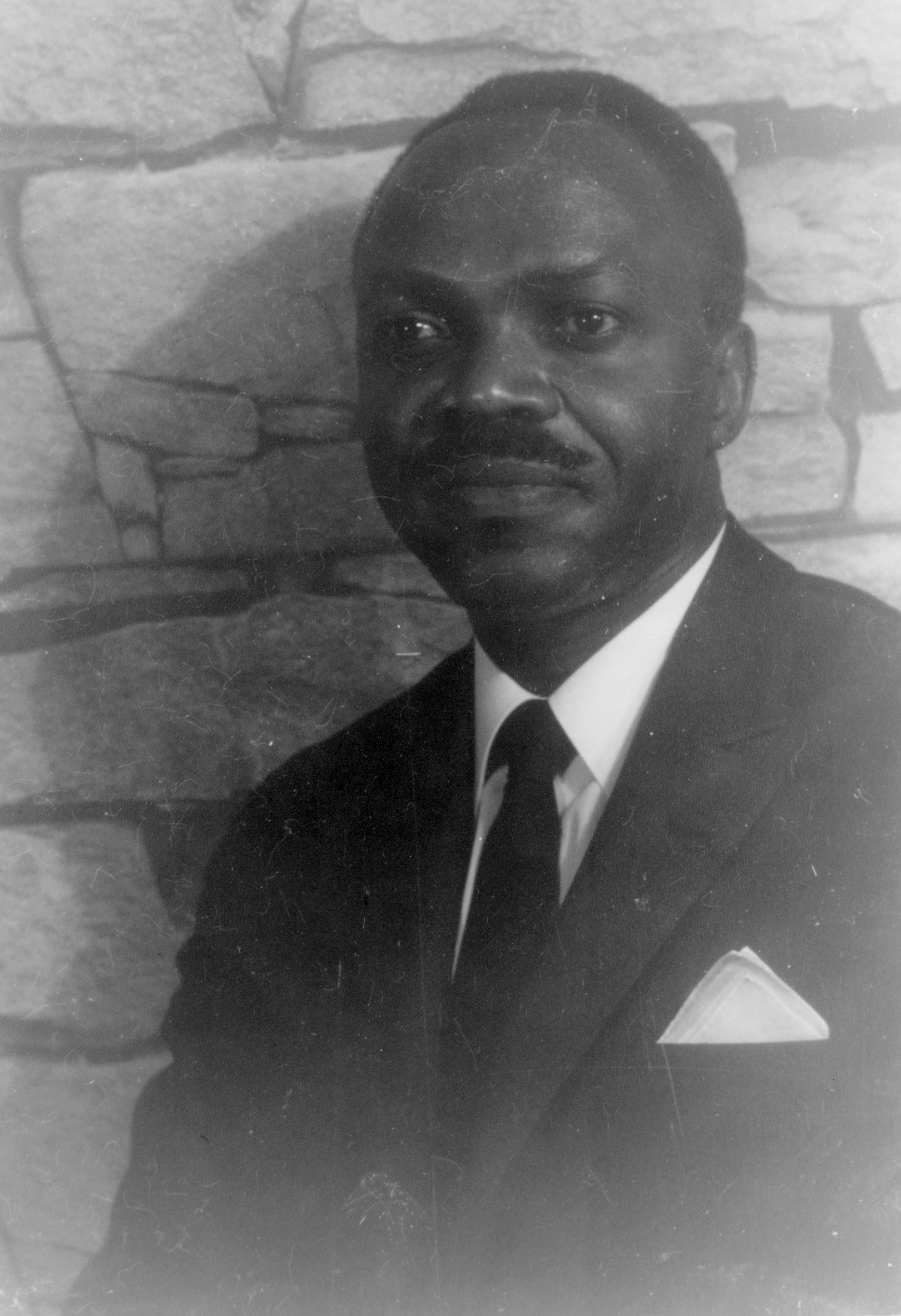
- Braithwaite in 1962
- Born: Eustace Edward Ricardo Braithwaite; June 27, 1912; Georgetown, British Guiana (now Guyana)
- Died: December 12, 2016 (aged 104); Rockville, Maryland, U.S.
- Education: City College of New York (B.S.); University of Cambridge (MSc)
- Occupations: Novelist, writer, diplomat, teacher, pilot
- Spouse: Sybil Allan (m. 1944, divorced)
- Partner: Genevieve Ast
- Writing career
- Genres: Fiction, literature

Eustace Edward Ricardo Braithwaite (June 27, 1912 – December 12, 2016), publishing as E. R. Braithwaite, was a Guyanese-born British-American novelist, writer, teacher and diplomat best known for his stories of social conditions and racial discrimination against black people. He was the author of the 1959 autobiographical novel To Sir, With Love, which was made into a 1967 British drama film of the same title, starring Sidney Poitier and Lulu. The narrator is an engineer, but to make ends meet, he accepts the job of teacher in a rough London school.

== Early life ==
Braithwaite was born in Georgetown, Guyana, on June 27, 1912 (some sources state 1920). Both of his parents had gone to Oxford University and he described growing up surrounded by education, achievement and parental pride. His father was a gold and diamond miner, and his mother was a homemaker. He attended Saint Ambrose Primary School, Queen's College, Guyana, and then City College of New York (1940). During World War II, he joined the Royal Air Force as a pilot. He later described this experience in To Sir, With Love as one where he had felt no discrimination based on his skin colour nor ethnicity. He went on to attend Gonville and Caius College, Cambridge (1949), where he earned a master's degree in physics.

== Career ==
After the war, despite his extensive training, Braithwaite could not find work in his field and, disillusioned, reluctantly accepted a job as a schoolteacher at St George-in-the-East Central School (now the Mulberry House apartments) adjacent to the north side of St George in the East church, in the Wapping area of the East End of London. His novel To Sir, With Love (1959) was based on his experiences there. It won an Anisfield-Wolf Book Award. To Sir, with Love was adapted into a film of the same title, starring Sidney Poitier. Although the film was a box-office success, many critics, and Braithwaite himself, considered it too sentimental. He also objected to the main character's mixed-race romance being given lower prominence in the film version. In 2007, he said on a BBC Radio 4 programme, To Sir, with Love Revisited, written and presented by Burt Caesar: "I detest the movie from the bottom of my heart."

While he was writing his book about the school Braithwaite turned to social work. It became his job to find foster homes for non-white children for the London County Council. This experience resulted in Paid Servant: A Report About Welfare Work in London, published in the UK in 1962. Braithwaite continued to write novels and short stories throughout his long international career as an educational consultant and lecturer for UNESCO.

He was the first Permanent Representative of Guyana to the United Nations from 1967 to 1969. He was elected to the presidency of the United Nations Council for South West Africa in 1968. He later served as Guyana's Ambassador to Venezuela.

In 1973, South Africa lifted its ban on Braithwaite's books and he subsequently visited the country. While there, he was granted the status of "honorary white", which gave him significantly more freedom of movement than the indigenous black population but less than the whites, a situation he found detestable. He recorded his experiences during the six weeks he spent in South Africa in his book Honorary White (London: The Bodley Head, 1975, ISBN 978-0370103570).

He taught English studies at New York University and in 2002 was a writer-in-residence at Howard University, Washington, D.C. He spent the 2005–06 academic year as a visiting professor at Manchester Community College (Connecticut). He also served as the college's commencement speaker for that year and received an honorary degree.

He turned 100 in 2012, and on a visit to Guyana while serving as the patron of the Inter-Guiana Cultural Festival, he was given a national award, the Cacique Crown of Honour, by then-President Donald Ramotar.

In 2013, Braithwaite attended the first live performance of the stage version of To Sir, With Love. The play was written by Ayub Khan Din as part of Royal & Derngate, Northampton's Made In Northampton theatrical season. The play was directed by Mark Babych and starred Ansu Kabia in the title role and Matthew Kelly. This was the first theatre-adoption of the book.

== Personal life and death ==
Braithwaite married Sybil Allan in England in 1944; the couple had five children before divorcing in the 1950s.

Braithwaite later settled in Washington, D.C., with his partner, Genevieve Ast.

Braithwaite died at the Adventist HealthCare Shady Grove Medical Center in Rockville, Maryland, on December 12, 2016, at the age of 104.

== Selected bibliography ==
- To Sir, With Love (1959)
- Paid Servant (1962)
- A Kind of Homecoming (1962)
- Choice of Straws (1965)
- Reluctant Neighbors (1972)
- Honorary White (1975)
- Billingsly: The Bear With The Crinkled Ear (2014)

== See also ==
- List of teachers portrayed in films
- List of centenarians (authors, poets and journalists)
