= Modern Heart (Champaign album) =

1983 studio album by Champaign

Studio album by Champaign
- Released: March 13, 1983
- Recorded: May–August 1982
- Studio: Creative Audio (Urbana), George Massenburg Studios (West Los Angeles). Strings recorded at Universal Recording (Chicago). Track 5 recorded live at Smith Music Hall (University of Illinois)
- Genre: R&B
- Length: 34:22
- Label: Columbia
- Producer: George Massenburg, Champaign

Champaign chronology
How 'Bout Us (1981)	Modern Heart (1983)	Woman in Flames (1984)

Singles from Modern Heart
- 1. "Try Again" Released: February 1983; 2. "Let Your Body Rock" Released: July 1983

Professional ratings
Review scores
Source	Rating
AllMusic	2/5 stars

Modern Heart is the second studio album by American rhythm and blues group Champaign, released in March 1983 via Columbia Records. The album did not chart in the United States, but the album's only official single (Note: "Let Your Body Rock" was released from the album as a promotional single.) "Try Again" peaked at #23 on the Billboard Hot 100.

== Track listing ==
No.	Title	Writer(s)	Length
1.	"Let Your Body Rock"	Bill Millikin; Stephen Wilkin; Arthur King; Michael Day; Rocky Maffit	4:18
2.	"Try Again"	Day; Maffit; Dana Walden	3:46
3.	"Party Line"	Michael Day; Rocky Maffit	3:51
4.	"Cool Running"	Michael Day; Pauli Carman; Rocky Maffit	3:16
5.	"Walkin'"	Rocky Maffit	2:07
6.	"Keep It Up"	Dana Walden; Michael Day; Pauli Carman; Rocky Maffit	3:58
7.	"Love Games"	Dana Walden	4:39
8.	"Get It Again"	Dana Walden; Leon Howard Reeder; Pauli Carman	3:38
9.	"International Feel"	Michael Day; Rocky Maffit; Dana Walden	4:32
