= Ngaire Fuata =

- Also known as: Ngaire
- Born: 1966 or 1967 (age 57–58); St Austell, England
- Origin: New Zealand
- Genres: Pop
- Occupations: Television producer
- Years active: 1990s

Ngaire Fuata (born 1966 or 1967 (age 57–58)) is a New Zealand television producer for TVNZ and a former Pop singer. She is of Rotuman and Dutch descent.

== Personal life ==
Born in England, Fuata later migrated to New Zealand with her parents at a young age. She grew up in Whakatāne. She has been working in the television industry for more than 20 years. In 2011, Fuata and her daughter visited her father's native island of Rotuma and filmed a documentary called Salat se Rotuma - Passage to Rotuma for TVNZ's Tagata Pasifika programme.

== Music career ==
Fuata released her debut album self-titled Ngaire in 1991. She is best known for her remake of Lulu's To Sir with Love. It spent 5 weeks at number one on the New Zealand charts in 1990.

== Filmography ==
=== Short films ===
Year	Short Film	Role	Note
2014	Ma	Executive Producer; Producer; Production Manager	Short Film
2012	Snow in Paradise	Associate Producer	Short Film
2011	Salat se Rotuma - Passage to Rotuma	Production Manager	Documentary

== Discography ==
=== Album ===
- 1991: Ngaire

=== Single ===
- To Sir with Love
- Son of a Preacher Man
