= Independence (song) =

Single by Lulu

from the album Independence
- B-side: Remix/"Restless Moods"
- Released: 1993
- Genre: Dance-pop; house; soul
- Length: 4:16 (Brothers In Rhythm Mix); 4:01 (C. J. Mackintosh Radio Mix)
- Label: Dome Records; Parlophone; SBK Records
- Songwriters: Leon Ware; Winston Sela
- Producers: Cary Baylis; Eliot Kennedy; Mike Ward

Lulu singles chronology
"I Could Never Miss You (More Than I Do)" (1981)	"Independence" (1993)	"Relight My Fire" (1993)

Music video
- "Independence" on YouTube

"Independence" is a song recorded by Scottish singer and songwriter Lulu. It was released in 1993, by Dome, Parlophone and SBK Records, as the first single from her eleventh album by the same name (1993), and was by many seen as the singer's comeback, after not releasing new material since 1982. The song was written by Leon Ware and Winston Sela, and produced by Cary Baylis, Eliot Kennedy and Mike Ward. It became a hit in both Europe and the US, peaking at number 11 on the UK Singles Chart, number 34 on the Eurochart Hot 100 and number three on the US Billboard Hot Dance Club Play chart. The song received remixes by Brothers In Rhythm, C.J. Mackintosh and Tony Humphries, and a music video was also produced to promote the single.

== Critical reception ==
Jose F. Promis from AllMusic described the song as "housey and anthem-like", adding that it stands as "one of the better dance-pop songs of the decade." Larry Flick from Billboard magazine named it a "delicious pop/house anthem", noting that "she offers an assured vocal amid rousing mixes that will slam during mainstream peak-hour sets." He also stated that Lulu is in "excellent voice on a disco-minded house jam. Anthemic tune has a sing-along chorus that will stick in the heads of club and radio folks upon impact. Could be the first step in Lulu's carefully planned return to pop prominence." John Carmen from Cash Box said it's "one of those semi-liberated kinda anthems that the Brits eat up from their female pop stars." A reviewer from Liverpool Echo wrote, "A surprising comeback, this is Lulu's first new single in ten years and as usual she is keeping up with the trends. The record is typically bouncy, the voice as distinctively husky as ever, and the production today's version of disco."

Pan-European magazine Music & Media commented, "In recent years we've seen Sandie Shaw and Dusty Springfield re-emerging in the most unexpected musical contexts. Now another grand lady of '60s pop returns with an uptempo Lisa Stansfield-type of song." Alan Jones from Music Week gave it a score of four out of five and named it a "spirited and soulful comeback" and "excellent". Matthew Cole from the Record Mirror Dance Update wrote, "The ginger bob returns to her soul roots with a very catchy song, sweetly sung, all boosted by a gutsy CJ Mackintosh mix that will be preferred to the Brothers In Rhythm version. One to shout about — a surefire hit." Another Record Mirror editor, James Hamilton, deemed it an "unhurried classy Lisa Stansfield-ish garage loper". A reviewer from Spin compared the singer to Stansfield, writing that she "assumes the mantle of soul survivor, achieving Stansfield status", while Sunday Life wrote that the singer "steps into Lisa Stansfield-disco territory".

== Chart performance ==
"Independence" was a notable hit for Lulu and by many seen as her comeback in the 90s. The song reached its highest chart position as number three on the US Billboard Hot Dance Club Play chart. In Europe, the single entered the top 20 in the UK, peaking at number 11 on the UK Singles Chart on 30 January 1993, in its second week on the chart, just barely missing the top 10. Having debuted at number 14 the week before, the song then dropped to number 14 and 29 the following weeks, before leaving the UK Top 40. On both the Music Week UK Dance Singles chart and the Record Mirror UK Club Chart, "Independence" however managed to enter the top 10, peaking at number nine. In Germany, it spent 11 weeks inside the German Singles Chart, peaking at number 52. In Ireland, it peaked at number 21, as well as on the European Dance Radio Chart, where it peaked in March 1993. On the Eurochart Hot 100, the song reached its highest chart position as number 34 in February, in its second week on the chart. It debuted at number 52 on 6 February after charting in the United Kingdom.

== Track listing ==
- 12" single, US
1. "Independence" (C. J. Mackintosh Club Mix) – 7:51
2. "Independence" (Mackapella Mix) – 6:05
3. "Independence" (C. J. Mackintosh Radio Mix) – 4:00
4. "Independence" (Brothers In Rhythm Club Mix) – 6:44
5. "Independence" (Tony Humphries Free Dub Mix) – 9:50
- CD single, UK
1. "Independence" (Brothers In Rhythm Mix) – 4:16
2. "Independence" (C. J. Mackintosh Club Mix) – 7:53
3. "Independence" (Brothers In Rhythm Club Mix) – 6:45
4. "Independence" (C. J. Mackintosh Radio Mix) – 4:01
5. "Independence" (Mackapella Mix) – 6:05
- CD maxi, Europe
1. "Independence" (Brothers In Rhythm Mix)
2. "Independence" (C. J. Mackintosh Club Mix)
3. "Independence" (Brothers In Rhythm Club Mix)
- Cassette single, US
1. "Independence" (Brothers In Rhythm Mix) – 4:12
2. "Restless Moods" – 4:25
3. "Independence" (Brothers In Rhythm Mix) – 4:12
4. "Restless Moods" – 4:25

== Charts ==
=== Weekly charts ===
Chart (1993)	Peak position
Australia (ARIA)	195
Europe (Eurochart Hot 100)	34
Europe (European Dance Radio)	21
Germany (GfK)	52
Ireland (IRMA)	21
Israel (Israeli Singles Chart)	26
UK Singles (OCC)	11
UK Airplay (Music Week)	1
UK Dance (Music Week)	9
UK Club Chart (Music Week)	9
US Hot Dance Club Play (Billboard)	3
US Maxi-Singles Sales (Billboard)	35

=== Year-end charts ===
Chart (1993)	Position
UK Club Chart (Music Week)	97
