= Marion Massey =

British talent manager (c.1930–2014)

Marion Massey (born Marian Gordon, c.1930 – 1 March 2014) was a British talent manager. She discovered singer Lulu, at the age of fourteen, and managed her for twenty-five years thereafter.

== Career ==
Marian Gordon married Gerald Massey in 1951, and lived in the Holland Park area of London, England. She discovered Lulu at a Glasgow discothèque, The Lindella Club, in 1962, when Lulu, then known as Marie McDonald McLaughlin Lawrie, was fourteen. The club was owned by Marian Massey's brother, Tony Gordon, who introduced Lulu to Massey. It was Massey who changed Marie Lawrie's name to Lulu and that of her band from The Gleneagles to The Luvvers. Massey thereafter was able to obtain a first recording contract for Lulu and The Luvvers at Decca Records.

Massey is distinctive for becoming a music manager in the early 1960s, while at the same time raising three young children. Female music managers were particularly rare during this period. The only female contemporary to Massey during this period was Eve Taylor, manager of singer Sandie Shaw. During the commencement of Lulu's career, Massey invited Lulu to live with Massey's family in her London home.

Massey's second marriage was to Mark London, the composer of the melody to "To Sir With Love", from the movie of the same name, which became Lulu's biggest hit in the 1960s. During Massey's management of Lulu, London wrote and produced much of Lulu's music.

During their twenty-five year association, Massey and Lulu were equal partners, as a business enterprise, but encouraged by husband John Frieda, Lulu ended their business association in 1989 as she was frustrated that she was no longer seen as a recording artist and Massey was unable to further her recording career.

== Personal life ==
Massey's son is David Massey, a music business executive.
