= Steve DuBerry =

British songwriter

Steve DuBerry is a British Grammy Award nominated songwriter and record producer, co-writer of Tina Turner's "I Don't Wanna Fight" (along with Lulu and her brother Billy Lawrie). DuBerry has also written and produced songs for Tylah Yaweh, Blue, Jackie Jackson, Dominque Young Unique, Simon Webbe, Paulini, Chris De Burgh, Heather Small, Joe Cocker, Liberty X, Cliff Richard, and Marvin and Tamara.

He has composed and produced numerous major television titles, including Football Italia, World Rally, Channel 4's Horse Racing and FA Cup Soccer.

DuBerry has received 5 BMI awards, an Ivor Novello Award nomination, a Grammy Award nomination, and has received a BMI 2 Million Play award.

He is currently working with the Jacksons, Shawn Pereira and British band Blue.
