= How 'Bout Us (song) =

Single by Champaign

from the album How 'Bout Us
- B-side: "Lighten Up"
- Released: February 14, 1981
- Genre: R&B
- Length: 3:22 (single version); 4:38 (album version)
- Label: Columbia
- Songwriter: Dana Walden
- Producer: Leo Graham

Champaign singles chronology
"I'm on Fire" / "Spinnin'" (1981)	"How 'Bout Us" (1981)	"Can You Find the Time?" / "Whiplash" (1981)

Official video
- "How 'Bout Us" on YouTube

"How 'Bout Us" is the most successful single released by R&B music group Champaign. Composed by band keyboardist Dana Walden and originally released on the band's debut album How 'Bout Us, the title track peaked at number 12 on the Billboard Hot 100. A romantic ballad, the song was released on Valentine's Day, 1981.

== Song information ==
The song was originally released in 1975 by an earlier incarnation of the group, then called the Water Brothers Band. It was released as the B-side of their single, "Have You Ever Been Lonely?" on Sky Records NR6668. The band at the time of recording was made up of Dana Walden on keyboards & vocals, Howard "Leon" Reeder on vocals, lead & rhythm guitars, Keith Harden on vocals, lead & rhythm guitars, Scott Karlstrom on bass, and Bobby Carlin on drums.

It was re-recorded by Champaign, and it was Champaign's version that became a hit single. "How 'Bout Us" peaked at number 4 on the soul chart and was one of three releases to make the Top 10 on the soul chart. It was on the Hot 100 chart for 23 weeks, peaking at number 12 on June 6, 1981, and also reached the top of the Adult Contemporary chart for two weeks. Jet magazine listed the song in its "Soul Brothers Top 20 Singles" list for May and June 1981.

Champaign's membership included former Water Brothers members, Walden, Reeder and Day.

Casey Kasem played a portion of the Champaign version on his American Top 40 show. He then played the entire version of the Water Brothers release. This was broadcast on June 6, 1981.

== Chart performance ==
=== Weekly charts ===
Chart (1981)	Peak position
Australia (Kent Music Report)	24
Belgium (Ultratop 50 Flanders)	1
Canada Top Singles (RPM)	19
Canada Adult Contemporary (RPM)	3
Netherlands (Dutch Top 40)	1
Netherlands (Single Top 100)	1
New Zealand (Recorded Music NZ)	2
South Africa (Springbok Radio)	8
UK Singles (Official Charts)	5
US Billboard Hot 100	12
US Adult Contemporary (Billboard)	1
US Hot Soul Singles (Billboard)	4
US Cash Box Top 100	10
West Germany (GfK)	42

=== Year-end charts ===
Chart (1981)	Position
Belgium (Ultratop Flanders)	1
Netherlands (Dutch Top 40)	1
Netherlands (Single Top 100)	2
New Zealand (Recorded Music NZ)	4
UK Singles (OCC)	45
US Billboard Hot 100	45
US Hot R&B/Hip-Hop Songs (Billboard)	13
US Cash Box	69

=== All-time charts ===
All-time chart rankings for "How 'Bout Us"
Chart	Position
Dutch Love Songs (Dutch Top 40)	28

== Cover versions ==
- The song has been covered as a duet between blue-eyed soul singer Grayson Hugh and R&B singer Betty Wright; their version, from the soundtrack of the 1989 film True Love, peaked at number 30 on Billboard's R&B chart, crossing over to number 67 on the pop singles chart and number 15 on the Adult Contemporary chart.
- A cover by American country music group Girls Next Door peaked at number 71 on the Billboard Hot Country Singles & Tracks chart in 1990.

== See also ==
- List of number-one adult contemporary singles of 1981 (U.S.)
