= Champaign (band) =

American R&B band

- Origin: Champaign, Illinois, U.S.
- Genres: R&B, soul
- Years active: 1981–1984, 1990–1991, 2008–present
- Labels: Columbia; Malaco
- Members: Pauli Carman; Rena Day; Dana Walden; Michael Reed; Rocky Maffit; Leon Reeder
- Past members: Michael Day
- Website: www.champaignband.com

Champaign is an American R&B band, best known for their 1981 hit record, "How 'Bout Us".

== Background ==
The septet, who named themselves after their hometown of Champaign, Illinois, United States, included Pauli Carman and Rena Jones (later Day) on vocals; Michael Day and Dana Walden on keyboards; Leon Reeder on guitar; Michael Reed on bass; and Rocky Maffit on percussion and drums.

== Career ==
The song "How 'Bout Us" from their 1981 debut album (also called How 'Bout Us) was a hit single, reaching No. 5 in the UK Singles Chart, No. 4 on the US Billboard R&B chart, and No. 12 on the Billboard Hot 100. Reed had left the group by the release of their second album, Modern Heart, which appeared in 1983 and contained the No. 2 R&B hit "Try Again" (No. 23 on the Hot 100). Another follow-up, 1984's Woman in Flames, included the Top 10 R&B song "Off and On Love". Other songs include "Party People" and "Walkin'".

Carman released his first solo album, Dial My Number in 1986. The title track was an R&B hit, peaking at No. 26. His second album, It's Time was released the following year. It featured the single "In the Heat of the Night", which peaked at No. 72 on the R&B charts.

Rena Jones and Michael Day eventually married.

In 1990, Champaign (including Carman) reconvened to record, and the Champaign IV album was released the following year. In addition to Carman, the album featured contributions/production from Michael Lane (MicoWave), Rena and Michael Day, Dana Walden, and Rocky Maffit. Although the album was not widely successful, it did herald a brief return to the US R&B chart, with the single "Trials of the Heart".

Former band member Michael Day died of cancer on June 7, 2001.

By 2008, Pauli Carman, the original lead singer, continued to represent the group. In 2010, Get Back 2 Love was released (included a remaster of "How 'Bout Us").

On September 15, 2013, Carman was presented the National R&B Music Society 'Unsung Hero Award'.

== Discography ==
=== Studio albums ===
Year	Album	Peak chart positions		
Year	Album	US	US R&B	UK
1981	How 'Bout Us	53	—	38
1983	Modern Heart	—	—	—
1984	Woman in Flames	187	45	—
1991	Champaign IV	—	72	—
2003	How 'Bout Us (compilation)	—	—	—
2008	Carma	—	—	—
2010	Get Back 2 Love	—	—	—
2013	Love Kind	—	—	—
2014	Eyes of the Spirit	—	—	—
2025	Heart	—	—	—
"—" denotes releases that did not chart.

=== Singles ===
Year	Title	Peak chart positions					Certifications	Album
Year	Title	US Pop	US R&B	US AC	AUS	UK	Certifications	Album
1981	"How 'Bout Us"	12	4	1	24	5	BPI: Silver	How 'Bout Us
1981	"Can You Find the Time"	—	—	—	—	—		How 'Bout Us
1981	"I'm on Fire"	—	—	—	—	—		How 'Bout Us
1983	"Try Again"	23	2	6	—	—		Modern Heart
1983	"Let Your Body Rock"	—	—	—	—	—		Modern Heart
1984	"Off and on Love"	104	10	—	—	76		Woman in Flames
1984	"This Time"	—	43	—	—	—		Woman in Flames
1984	"Intimate Strangers"	—	—	—	—	—		Woman in Flames
1990	"Trials of the Heart"	—	64	—	—	—		Champaign IV
1990	"All My Love"	—	—	—	—	—		Champaign IV
2011	"Share"	—	—	—	—	—		
2022	"Can't Let You Go"	—	—	—	—	—		
2025	"Heart"	—	—	—	—	—		
"—" denotes releases that did not chart or were not released in that territory.
