= Neil Harrison =

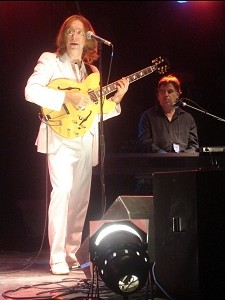
- Live at Wellington Country Park, Berkshire (2006)

Background information
- Born: 4 December 1950 (age 75)
- Genres: Pop, rock
- Occupation: Musician
- Instruments: Guitar, bass, piano, vocals
- Years active: 1973 – present
- Website: bootlegbeatles.co.uk

Neil Harrison (born 4 December 1950) is a British musician and dramatist. He was a founder-member of The Beatles tribute band, The Bootleg Beatles, in which he played John Lennon.

== The Bootleg Beatles ==
In 1979, aged 28, Harrison had joined the cast of the West End musical Beatlemania. In March 1980, after the musical's last West End show, Harrison formed The Bootleg Beatles with fellow cast members Andre Barreau and David Catlin-Birch. The band invested their dwindling finances in two guitars – an Epiphone and a Gretsch – as well as two Vox amplifiers, four black polo-necks and a wig.

On 26 March 2011 at a gig in St Albans, Neil Harrison – otherwise known as "Bootleg John" – shocked the audience after coming to the stage to perform "Imagine" as an encore by announcing that he was leaving the group "to bring the average age down a bit'. He sang "Imagine" after shouts of support and thanks from the crowd and was presented with a bouquet of flowers and a further gift from the band. The Bootlegs then performed "Back in the U.S.S.R." followed rather fittingly by the medley of songs from the Abbey Road album that culminates with "The End". The band left the stage to a standing ovation and further shouts of thanks to Neil.

== Meet the Beatles ==
Harrison has stated that he has met two original Beatles, on three occasions.

His first experience was in 1968, when he and some friends sang Christmas carols outside Paul McCartney's father's house on the Wirral. A photograph taken at the time exists.

The second meeting was in 1996 at David Gilmour's 50th birthday party. Gilmour booked both the Bootleg Beatles and the Australian Pink Floyd Show as he'd "always wanted to have the Beatles support Pink Floyd". George Harrison was in the audience and quipped "you probably know the chords better than I do" and "Where's the Bootleg Brian Epstein? 'Cos he's got all the money!"

The third meeting was at the Party at the Palace for the Golden Jubilee of Elizabeth II in 2002, where McCartney headlined.

== Other works ==
Outside the Bootleg Beatles, Harrison released an album in 1974 on Deram Records called All Dressed Up and Nowhere To Go.

He was an exclusive producer for the best selling Yugoslavian rock band Bijelo Dugme in period between 1975 and 1979.

He also wrote several songs for Lulu's album Don't Take Love for Granted, including the title track and "I Could Never Miss You (More Than I Do)", which was released as a single in 1981 and also included on her 1981 self-titled album Lulu. He has released another solo album entitled Richmond Hill.

He sang an acoustic version of "Strawberry Fields Forever" for the 2013 Spanish movie Living Is Easy with Eyes Closed.
