= Mark London =

Canadian-born British composer, songwriter and music producer (born 1940)

Mark London (born 30 January 1940) is a Canadian-born British soundtrack composer, songwriter and music producer. He is perhaps best known as composer of the song "To Sir with Love".

== History ==
Mark London was born in Montreal, Quebec, and initially worked as a comedian following a move to London. He first achieved prominence in 1967 as the composer of the melody to "To Sir With Love", the title song from James Clavell's movie of the same name, starring Sidney Poitier, Judy Geeson and Lulu. The song, co-written with lyricist Don Black, was recorded by Lulu and released as a single in the US, becoming the Billboard Year-End Top Single for 1967.

Also in 1967, London was the composer, with Mike Leander, of the soundtrack to the movie Privilege, starring Paul Jones. London also acted in the film. The other soundtrack credit during this period was the score for Maximilian Schell's First Love (1970).

London maintained a longstanding association with Lulu, as both a songwriter and producer. With Don Black, London co-wrote "Best of Both Worlds", Lulu's follow-up single to "To Sir With Love", which was also recorded by Scott Walker. London also produced Lulu's 1978 album, Don't Take Love For Granted. London was married Lulu's longtime manager, Marion Massey. London also co-write the soundtrack for seven series of animation films, for children 1 to 6 years old. He also co-wrote the music for Channel One, the first cable news network in the United Kingdom, for five years.

London was also involved with the management and production associated with other bands, in particular Cartoone, in which Led Zeppelin manager Peter Grant had a financial interest, and Stone the Crows. With respect to Stone the Crows, London co-managed the band with Grant, who was his best friend, who had also named Stone the Crows. Stone the Crows signed a management contract with Grant and London in 1969. Mark London produced Stone the Crows' eponymous first album, released in 1970, and is credited as a co-writer of "I Saw America", which occupied an entire side of the album. Grant is credited as executive producer. London also produced the three follow-up albums by Stone the Crows, released between 1970 and 1972, with Grant credited as executive producer.

Stone the Crows broke up in 1973, shortly after the accidental onstage electrocution death of guitarist Les Harvey. Mark London and Peter Grant then offered to help lead singer Maggie Bell record a solo album. She subsequently recorded two for Atlantic Records, one produced by Felix Pappalardi and the other produced by Felix Cavaliere. Neither has yet been released. London later participated in Maggie Bell's Suicide Sal album (1975), as a background vocalist. The album was released on Swan Song Records, a record label established by Grant for Led Zeppelin and other acts, and where London was responsible for band security. In 1976, London produced McKendree Spring's Too Young To Feel This Old album.

In the 1980s and 1990s, London continued as a soundtrack composer. He composed the soundtracks to the short Act V (1981), the comedy horror film, Bloodbath at the House of Death (1984), the television short Mr. Men, Little Misses (1991) and the television series Junglies (1992).
