= To Sir with Love (song) =

"To Sir With Love"
- US vinyl release (Epic Records)

Single by Lulu

from the album To Sir, with Love
- B-side: "It's Getting Harder All the Time" (The Mindbenders) (UK); "The Boat That I Row" (US)
- Released: September 1967
- Genre: Pop
- Length: 2:47
- Label: Epic
- Composer: Mark London
- Lyricist: Don Black
- Producer: Mickie Most

Lulu singles chronology
"Shout" (1964)	"To Sir With Love" (1967)	"Shout" (1967)

"To Sir with Love" is a song written by written by Don Black and Mark London and first recorded by Scottish singer Lulu. The song served as the theme from James Clavell's 1967 film To Sir, with Love, in which Lulu also acted. Mickie Most produced the record, with Mike Leander arranging and conducting.

The song peaked at the top of the Billboard Hot 100, and became the best-selling single of 1967 in the United States.

== Background ==
Songwriter Mark London was the husband of Lulu's longtime manager Marion Massey.

The song's commercial success made Lulu the second British female artist to top the US charts during the listing's Rock era, the first being Petula Clark's "Downtown" in 1965. It was third such song in the overall history of the US charts after "Downtown" and Vera Lynn's "Auf Wiederseh'n Sweetheart" in 1952. The song was the first of two Scottish female solo artists to achieve the feat, the second being Sheena Easton with her number-one hit "Morning Train (9 to 5)" in May 1981.

Lulu and Easton remained the only Scottish solo artists to have topped the Billboard Hot 100 until Calvin Harris topped the chart alongside Rihanna on their collaboration "We Found Love" in November 2011.

== Oscar nomination ==
The film's director, James Clavell, and Lulu's manager Marion Massey were bothered when the title song was not included in the nominations for the Academy Award for Best Original Song at the 40th Academy Awards in 1968. Clavell and Massey raised a formal objection to the exclusion, to no avail.

== Chart performance ==
"To Sir With Love" was initially recorded by Lulu (with The Mindbenders, who also acted in the film). It was released as a single in the United States in 1967 and in October reached No. 1 on the Billboard Hot 100, where it remained for five weeks. The single ranked No. 1 in Billboard's year-end chart. It became a gold record.

Canada's RPM magazine put the song at No. 2 for the year 1967 although it did not appear on the weekly charts. Instead the A-side The Boat That I Row reached No. 1. Both sides were charted on the CHUM Charts reaching No. 1. "To Sir with Love" did not chart in the UK, as it appeared only as a B-side to "Let's Pretend" (released in the UK on 23 June 1967), which reached No. 11 on the UK Singles Chart.

== Charts ==
=== Weekly charts ===
Chart (1967–1968)	Peak position
Australia (Kent Music Report)	18
Canada RPM Top Singles	1
Malaysia (Radio Malaysia)	1
New Zealand	12
Singapore (Radio Singapore)	1
UK Singles Chart (The Official Charts Company)	11
US Billboard Hot 100	1
US Billboard Top Selling R&B Singles	9
US Cash Box Top 100	1

=== Year-end charts ===
Chart (1967)	Rank
Canada	2
US Billboard Hot 100	1
US Cash Box Top 100	5

== Certifications ==
Certifications for "To Sir with Love"
Region	Certification	Certified units/sales
New Zealand (RMNZ)	Gold	15,000^{‡}
United States (RIAA)	Gold	1,000,000^{^}
^{^} Shipments figures based on certification alone.^{‡} Sales+streaming figures based on certification alone.

== Cover versions ==
- King Curtis released an instrumental version on his November 1967 album "King Size Soul".
- Herbie Mann's instrumental rendition charted concurrently with Lulu's run on the pop chart, reaching No. 93 on the US Billboard Hot 100 and No. 11 on the Adult Contemporary chart.
- In 1983, American actress Vicki Sue Robinson released a version of the song that peaked at number seven on the Australian Kent Music Report and was the 58th biggest selling single in Australia in 1984.
- New Zealand singer Ngaire Fuata covered the song which was released as a single in 1990 where it spent 5 weeks at No. 1 on the New Zealand Singles Chart. It was included in her self-titled debut album Ngaire released in 1991.
- At the MTV Inaugural Ball in 1993 10,000 Maniacs, joined by Michael Stipe of R.E.M., performed the song live; it was released shortly thereafter as a B-side on the single release of "Few and Far Between".
- The Trash Can Sinatras recorded a version for their 1996 album A Happy Pocket. It was released later that year as the fourth and final single from the album reaching number 80 in the UK singles chart and number 60 in the Scottish singles chart.
- Chaka Khan recorded a version accompanied by the London Symphony Orchestra for her 2004 album ClassiKhan.
- Scottish singer Midge Ure also recorded a version for his 2008 cover versions CD 10.
- Brazilian singer Zezé Di Camargo released a portuguese version in his 1988 second solo studio album
