= Lulu discography =

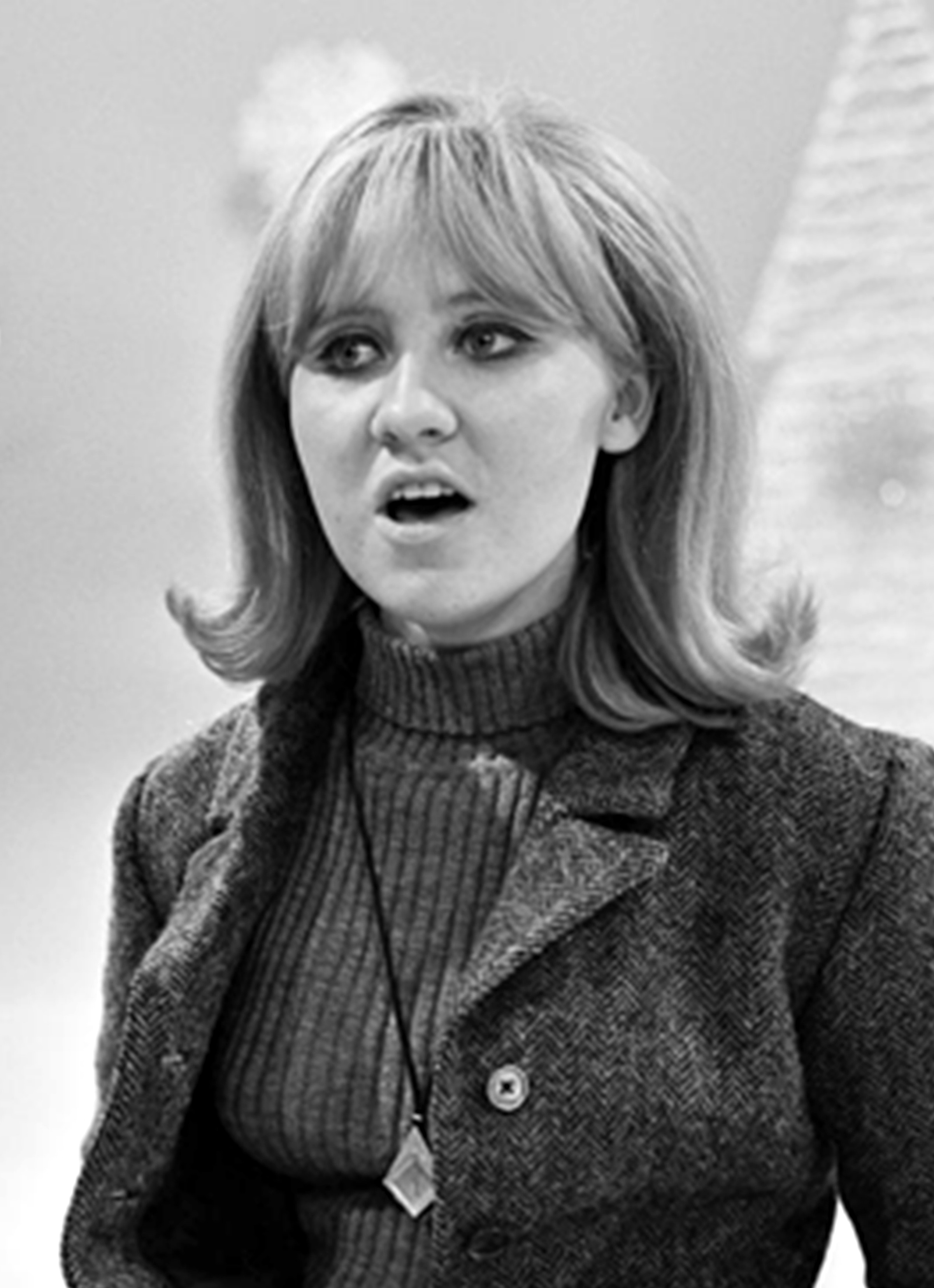
- Lulu performing during a television appearance, 1965
- Studio albums: 15
- Compilation albums: 10
- Singles: 69

This is a comprehensive listing of the discography released by Scottish singer Lulu. She has released 15 studio albums, 10 compilation albums and 69 singles throughout her career which began in 1964. Her debut album, Something to Shout About, was released in 1965 and included the commercially successful single "Shout". Her second album, Love Loves to Love Lulu, reached number twenty-four on the Billboard 200 in the United States, as well as number eighteen in New Zealand.

In 1967, her single To Sir, with Love peaked at the top of the Billboard Hot 100, and became the best-selling single of 1967 in the United States.

In 1969, she represented the United Kingdom at that years Eurovision Song Contest which she won with a song she hated, "Boom Bang-a-Bang". That same year, she released the album Lulu's Album (1969), and went onto release New Routes and Melody Fair, both of which were released in 1970. Her first album to chart on the UK Albums Chart came in 1993 with the release of Independence which spawned the commercially successful title track as a single release. In 2002, she released Together which peaked at number four in the United Kingdom and obtained a Gold certification from the British Phonographic Industry.

She released a further three albums, Back on Track (2004), A Little Soul in Your Heart (2005) and Making Life Rhyme (2015), all of which achieved moderate commercial success in the United Kingdom and her native Scotland. In 1974, Lulu performed the title song for the James Bond film The Man with the Golden Gun. In the mid-1990s, Lulu had her first number-one single in the UK: "Relight My Fire", with English boy band Take That.

== Albums ==
=== Studio albums ===
List of studio albums, with selected chart positions and certifications
Title	Album details	Peak chart positions					Certifications
Title	Album details	SCO	UK	IRE	NZ	US	Certifications
Something to Shout About aka Lulu!	Released: 1965; Label: Decca; Formats: LP	—	—	—	—	—	
Love Loves to Love Lulu aka Lulu Sings "To Sir With Love"	Released: 1967; Label: Columbia, Epic; Formats: LP	—	—	—	18	24	
Lulu!	Released: 1967; Label: Ace Of Clubs; Formats: LP	—	—	—	—	—	
Lulu's Album aka It's Lulu	Released: 1969; Label: Columbia, Epic; Formats: LP	—	—	—	—	—	
New Routes	Released: 1970; Label: Atco; Formats: LP	—	—	—	—	88	
Melody Fair	Released: 1970; Label: Atco; Formats: LP, cassette	—	—	—	—	—	
Lulu	Released: 1973; Label: Chelsea; Formats: LP, cassette	—	—	—	—	—	
Heaven and Earth and the Stars	Released: 1976; Label: Chelsea; Formats: LP, cassette	—	—	—	—	—	
Don't Take Love for Granted	Released: 1979; Label: Rocket; Formats: LP, cassette	—	—	—	—	—	
Lulu	Released: 1981; Label: Alfa; Formats: LP, cassette	—	—	—	—	126	
Take Me to Your Heart Again	Released: 1982; Label: Alfa; Formats: LP, cassette	—	—	—	—	—	
Independence	Released: 22 February 1993; Label: Dome; Formats: CD, LP, cassette	—	67	—	—	—	
Together	Released: 20 May 2002; Label: Mercury; Formats: CD, cassette	2	4	22	14	—	BPI: Gold
Back on Track	Released: 15 March 2004; Label: Mercury; Formats: CD, digital download	36	68	—	—	—	
A Little Soul in Your Heart	Released: 8 August 2005; Label: Globe; Formats: CD, digital download	10	29	—	—	—	
Making Life Rhyme	Released: 13 April 2015; Label: Decca; Formats: CD, digital download	21	35	—	—	—	
Let The Girl Sing Out	Released: 22 January 2027; Label: Formats: CD, digital download						
"—" denotes a release that did not chart or was not released in that territory.

=== Compilation albums ===
List of compilation albums, with selected chart positions and certifications
Title	Album details	Peak chart positions			Certifications
Title	Album details	SCO	UK	NZ	Certifications
The Most of Lulu	Released: 1971; Label: Music for Pleasure; Formats: LP	—	15	32	
The Very Best of Lulu	Released: 1980; Label: Warwick; Formats: LP, cassette	—	—	—	
I'm a Tiger	Released: 1989; Label: Music for Pleasure; Formats: CD, LP, cassette	—	—	—	
From Crayons to Perfume: The Best of Lulu	Released: 15 November 1994; Label: Rhino; Formats: CD	—	—	—	
I'm Back for More: The Very Best of Her Nineties Recordings	Released: 7 December 1999; Label: Dome; Formats: CD	—	—	—	
The Greatest Hits	Released: 10 November 2003; Label: Mercury; Formats: CD, CD+DVD	—	35	—	BPI: Silver
To Sir With Love! The Complete Mickie Most Recordings	Released: 31 January 2005; Label: EMI; Formats: CD, digital download	—	—	—	
The Atco Sessions: 1969–72	Released: 12 November 2007; Label: Rhino; Formats: CD, digital download	—	—	—	
The Collection	Released: 2 June 2008; Label: EMI; Formats: CD, digital download	—	—	—	
Shout! The Complete Decca Recordings	Released: 18 May 2009; Label: RPM Retrodisc; Formats: CD	—	—	—	
Decade 1967-1976 Box Set	Released: 16 November 2018; Label: Edsel; Formats: CD	—	—	—	
Gold	Released: May 2021; Label: Crimson; Formats: CD, digital	11	78	—	
"—" denotes a release that did not chart or was not released in that territory.

=== Other albums ===
List of miscellaneous albums
Title	Album details
Shape Up and Dance	Released: 1984; Label: Lifestyle; Formats: LP, cassette
Absolutely	Released: 1997; Label: Dome; Formats: CD
Lulu on the Dancefloor: The Remixes	Released: 3 March 2008; Label: Dome; Formats: Digital download
Independence: Expanded Edition	Released: 2026; Label: Dome; Formats: CD Box Set, Digital download

== Singles ==
=== 1960s ===
Title	Year	Peak chart positions										Certifications	Album
Title	Year	UK	AUS	BEL	CAN	FRA	GER	IRE	NLD	NZ	US	Certifications	Album
"Shout" (Lulu and the Luvvers)	1964	7	—	—	—	79	—	—	—	—	94		Something to Shout About
"Can't Hear You No More"	1964	—	—	—	—	—	—	—	—	—	—		—N/a
"Here Comes the Night"	1964	50	—	—	—	—	—	—	—	—	—		—N/a
"I'll Come Running Over"	1964	—	—	—	14	—	—	—	—	—	105		Something to Shout About
"Satisfied" (Lulu and the Luvvers)	1965	—	—	—	—	—	—	—	—	—	—		—N/a
"Leave a Little Love"	1965	8	—	—	—	—	—	—	—	—	—		Something to Shout About
"Try to Understand"	1965	25	—	—	—	—	—	—	—	—	—		Something to Shout About
"Tell Me Like it Is"	1965	—	—	—	—	—	—	—	—	—	—		Something to Shout About
"Call Me"	1966	—	—	—	—	—	—	—	—	—	—		—N/a
"What a Wonderful Feeling"	1966	—	—	—	—	—	—	—	—	—	—		—N/a
"The Boat That I Row"	1967	6	49	41	—	37	—	15	—	9	115		Love Loves to Love Lulu
"To Sir with Love" (B-side of "Let's Pretend" in the UK)	1967	—	18	—	1	—	—	—	—	12	1	RIAA: Gold; RMNZ: Gold	Love Loves to Love Lulu
"Let's Pretend"	1967	11	—	—	—	—	—	—	—	—	—		Love Loves to Love Lulu
"Love Loves to Love Love"	1967	32	—	—	—	34	—	—	—	—	—		Love Loves to Love Lulu
"Best of Both Worlds"	1968	—	—	—	—	—	—	—	—	—	32		Love Loves to Love Lulu
"Me, the Peaceful Heart"	1968	9	20	—	—	—	—	11	43	12	53		—N/a
"Boy"	1968	15	25	—	91	—	—	—	—	6	108		—N/a
"Morning Dew"	1968	—	—	—	55	—	—	—	—	9	52		Love Loves to Love Lulu
"I'm a Tiger"	1968	9	19	—	—	—	4	8	—	1	—		—N/a
"Boom Bang-a-Bang"	1969	2	15	4	—	41	8	1	19	5	—		—N/a
"Oh Me Oh My (I'm a Fool for You Baby)"	1969	47	33	—	16	—	—	—	—	12	22		New Routes
"—" denotes a release that did not chart or was not released in that territory.

=== 1970s ===
Title	Year	Peak chart positions									Certifications	Album
Title	Year	UK	AUS	BEL	CAN	GER	IRE	NLD	NZ	US	Certifications	Album
"Hum a Song (From Your Heart)" (with the Dixie Flyers)	1970	—	55	—	47	—	—	—	—	54		Melody Fair
"After the Feeling is Gone" (with the Dixie Flyers)	1970	—	—	—	—	—	—	—	—	117		Melody Fair
"To the Other Woman (I'm the Other Woman)" (with the Dixie Flyers)	1970	—	—	—	—	—	—	—	—	—		Melody Fair
"Got to Believe in Love"	1971	—	—	—	—	—	—	—	—	—		—N/a
"Everybody Clap"	1971	53 (Note: Chart position is from the official UK "Breakers List".)	—	—	—	—	—	—	—	—		—N/a
"Even If I Could Change"	1972	—	—	—	—	—	—	—	—	—		—N/a
"You Ain't Wrong, You Just Ain't Right"	1972	—	—	—	—	—	—	—	—	—		—N/a
"Make Believe World"	1972	—	—	—	—	—	—	—	—	—		Lulu
"The Man Who Sold the World"	1974	3	81	24	—	13	8	10	8	—	BPI: Silver	Heaven and Earth and the Stars
"The Man with the Golden Gun"	1974	—	—	—	—	—	—	—	—	—		Heaven and Earth and the Stars
"Take Your Mama for a Ride"	1975	37	—	18	—	—	—	10	—	—		Heaven and Earth and the Stars
"Boy Meets Girl"	1975	—	—	—	—	—	—	—	—	—		Heaven and Earth and the Stars
"Heaven and Earth and the Stars"	1975	—	—	—	—	—	—	—	—	—		Heaven and Earth and the Stars
"Your Love is Everywhere"	1978	—	—	—	—	—	—	—	—	—		—N/a
"Don't Take Love for Granted"	1978	—	—	—	—	—	—	—	—	—		Don't Take Love for Granted
"I Love to Boogie"	1979	—	—	—	—	—	—	—	—	—		Don't Take Love for Granted
"—" denotes a release that did not chart or was not released in that territory.

=== 1980s ===
Title	Year	Peak chart positions						Album
Title	Year	UK	AUS	CAN	IRE	NZ	US	Album
"I Could Never Miss You (More Than I Do)"	1981	62	71	10	—	3	18	Lulu
"If I Were You"	1982	—	—	—	—	6	44	Lulu
"Who's Foolin' Who"	1982	—	—	—	—	—	106	Lulu
"I Will Do It for Your Love"	1982	—	—	—	—	—	—	Take Me to Your Heart Again
"Take Me to Your Heart Again"	1982	—	—	—	—	—	—	Take Me to Your Heart Again
"Is That So?"	1984	—	—	—	—	—	—	Shape Up and Dance
"Love Is the Answer"	1985	—	—	—	—	—	—	—N/a
"Hello, Dear Friend"	1985	—	—	—	—	—	—	—N/a
"Shout" (re-recording & original combined)	1986	8	—	—	5	—	—	—N/a
"My Boy Lollipop"	1986	86	—	—	—	—	—	—N/a
"—" denotes a release that did not chart or was not released in that territory.

=== 1990s ===
Title	Year	Peak chart positions						Certifications	Album
Title	Year	UK	AUS	BEL	GER	IRE	NLD	Certifications	Album
"Nellie the Elephant"	1990	—	—	—	—	—	—		—N/a
"Independence"	1993	11	—	—	52	21	—		Independence
"I'm Back for More" (duet with Bobby Womack)	1993	27	—	—	—	—	—		Independence
"Let Me Wake Up in Your Arms"	1993	51	—	—	—	—	—		Independence
"Relight My Fire" (Take That featuring Lulu)	1993	1	33	10	18	2	10	BPI: Gold	Everything Changes
"How 'Bout Us"	1993	46	—	—	—	—	—		Independence
"Goodbye Baby and Amen"	1994	40	—	—	—	—	—		Absolutely
"Every Woman Knows"	1994	44	—	—	—	—	—		Absolutely
"The Messenger" (duet with Elton John)	1999	—	—	—	—	—	—		Elton John and Tim Rice's Aida
"Hurt Me So Bad"	1999	42	—	—	—	—	—		—N/a
"Better Get Ready"	1999	59	—	—	—	—	—		—N/a
"—" denotes a release that did not chart or was not released in that territory.

=== 2000–present ===
Title	Year	Peak chart positions						Certifications	Album
Title	Year	UK	AUS	BEL	IRE	NLD	NZ	Certifications	Album
"Where the Poor Boys Dance"	2000	24	—	—	—	—	—		—N/a
"Phunk Phoolin'" (Kerphunk featuring Lulu)	2002	—	—	—	—	—	—		Together
"We've Got Tonight" (duet with Ronan Keating)	2002	4	12	14	10	7	46	ARIA: Gold	Together
"All the Love in the World"	2003	—	—	—	—	—	—		Back on Track
"Keep Talkin... I'm Listening"	2004	—	—	—	—	—	—		Back on Track
"Put a Little Love in Your Heart"	2005	—	—	—	—	—	—		A Little Soul in Your Heart
"Run Rudolph Run"	2007	—	—	—	—	—	—		—N/a
"The Word is Love"	2010	—	—	—	—	—	—		—N/a
"Faith in You"	2015	—	—	—	—	—	—		Making Life Rhyme
"Shout 2015"	2015	—	—	—	—	—	—		Making Life Rhyme
"Cry" (with the Military Wives Choirs)	2016	—	—	—	—	—	—		Making Life Rhyme
"I'm in Love Again"	2026	— (Note: "I'm in Love Again" did not enter the UK Singles Chart, but debuted at number 84 on the UK Singles Sales Chart.)	—	—	—	—	—		Let the Girl Sing Out
"All Around the World"	2026	—	—	—	—	—	—		Let the Girl Sing Out
"—" denotes a release that did not chart or was not released in that territory.
