= Happening for Lulu =

British television series

Happening for Lulu is the original title of a television series broadcast on BBC1 from 1968 to 1969 hosted by Lulu and produced by Stanley Dorfman. The show's title was changed to Lulu from episode 3, broadcast 11 January 1969. Jimi Hendrix was banned from the BBC after he and his band disrupted the show by changing the song list and continuing on to play after the allotted amount. Subsequent series were titled "It's Lulu!" but the final series broadcast in 1975 was the second to be titled simply 'Lulu'.

== Episodes ==
Series 1

No. overall	No. in season	Title	Directed by	Original release date
1	1	"Episode 1"	Stanley Dorfman	28 December 1968
The first programme in a new series of music and laughter featuring the world of Lulu and her special guests and friends, with Johnny Harris and his Orchestra. Vocal backing: Sue and Sunny with Kay and dance troupe Pan's People (Choreography by Flick Colby).
2	2	"Episode 2"	Stanley Dorfman	4 January 1969
Music & laughter featuring the world of Lulu and her special guests and friends, with Johnny Harris and his Orchestra. Vocal backing: Sue and Sunny with Kay and dance troupe Pan's People. Among the guests Lulu will welcome tonight is Jimi Hendrix whose sensational rendering of Bob Dylan's song 'All along the watch-tower' recently rocketed him back into the Top Ten.
3	3	"Episode 3"	Stanley Dorfman	11 January 1969
A Song for Europe in this week’s programme of music & laughter featuring the world of Lulu and her special guests and friends, with Johnny Harris and his Orchestra. Vocal backing: Sue and Sunny with Kay and dance troupe Pan's People.
4	4	"Episode 4"	Stanley Dorfman	18 January 1969
A Song for Europe in this week’s programme of music & laughter featuring the world of Lulu and her special guests and friends, with Johnny Harris and his Orchestra. Vocal backing: Sue and Sunny with Kay and dance troupe Pan's People.
5	5	"Episode 5"	Stanley Dorfman	25 January 1969
A Song for Europe in this week’s programme of music & laughter featuring the world of Lulu and her special guests and friends, with Johnny Harris and his Orchestra. Vocal backing: Sue and Sunny with Kay and dance troupe Pan's People.
6	6	"Episode 6"	Stanley Dorfman	1 February 1969
A Song for Europe in this week’s programme of music & laughter featuring the world of Lulu and her special guests and friends, with Johnny Harris and his Orchestra. Vocal backing: Sue and Sunny with Kay and dance troupe Pan's People.
7	7	"Episode 7"	Stanley Dorfman	8 February 1969
A Song for Europe in this week’s programme of music & laughter featuring the world of Lulu and her special guests and friends, with Johnny Harris and his Orchestra. Vocal backing: Sue and Sunny with Kay and dance troupe Pan's People.
8	8	"Episode 8"	Stanley Dorfman	15 February 1969
A Song for Europe in this week’s programme of music & laughter featuring the world of Lulu and her special guests and friends, with Johnny Harris and his Orchestra. Vocal backing: Sue and Sunny with Kay and dance troupe Pan's People.
9	9	"A Song For Europe 1969"	Stanley Dorfman	22 February 1969
Lulu and ‘A Song for Europe 1969’ introduced by Michael Aspel, featuring Johnny Harris & His Orchestra. Vocal backing by Sue & Sunny with Kay and featuring dancers Pan’s People.
10	10	"Episode 10"	Stanley Dorfman	1 March 1969
Tonight Lulu sings the winning song voted by you as Britain's entry for the Eurovision Song Contest 1969 and features her special guests and friends Johnny Harris & His Orchestra with vocal backing from Sue and Sunny and Pan's People.
11	11	"Episode 11"	Stanley Dorfman	8 March 1969
Music & laughter featuring the world of Lulu and her special guests and friends, with Johnny Harris and his Orchestra. Vocal backing: Sue and Sunny and dance troupe Pan's People.
12	12	"Episode 12"	Stanley Dorfman	15 March 1969
Music & laughter featuring the world of Lulu and her special guests and friends, with Johnny Harris and his Orchestra. Vocal backing: Sue and Sunny and dance troupe Pan's People.
13	13	"Episode 13"	Stanley Dorfman	22 March 1969
In the last programme of her series, Lulu and her special guests and friends, with Johnny Harris and his Orchestra. Vocal backing: Sue and Sunny and dance troupe Pan's People. Lulu sings Britain’s entry for next Saturday’s Eurovision Song Contest in Madrid.

=== Lulu (Series 2) ===
Broadcast Saturdays on BBC1. Produced by Stewart Morris. Theme Song: The Man with the Golden Gun

No. overall	No. in season	Title	Directed by	Original release date
55	1	"Episode 1"	Stewart Morris	4 January 1975 at 8:20pm
Starring Lulu with Bernie Clifton and the Shadows singing ‘A Song for Europe 1975’. Featuring the Nigel Lythgoe Dancers and Alyn Ainsworth & His Orchestra. This week’s guest: Michael Bates.
56	2	"Episode 2"	Stewart Morris	11 January 1975 at 8:25pm
Starring Lulu with Bernie Clifton and the Shadows singing ‘A Song for Europe 1975’. Featuring the Nigel Lythgoe Dancers and Alyn Ainsworth & His Orchestra. This week’s guests: Ian Lavender and Jackie Pallo.
57	3	"Episode 3"	Stewart Morris	18 January 1975 at 8:20pm
Starring Lulu with Bernie Clifton and the Shadows singing ‘A Song for Europe 1975’. Featuring the Nigel Lythgoe Dancers and Alyn Ainsworth & His Orchestra. This week’s guests: Hughie Green and Gilbert O’Sullivan.
58	4	"Episode 4"	Stewart Morris	25 January 1975 at 8:25pm
Starring Lulu with Bernie Clifton and the Shadows singing ‘A Song for Europe 1975’. Featuring the Nigel Lythgoe Dancers and Alyn Ainsworth & His Orchestra. This week’s guests: Richard O'Sullivan and the King’s Singers.
59	5	"Episode 5"	Stewart Morris	1 February 1975 at 8:20pm
Starring Lulu with Bernie Clifton and the Shadows singing ‘A Song for Europe 1975’. Featuring the Nigel Lythgoe Dancers and Alyn Ainsworth & His Orchestra. This week’s guests: Norman Collier and Labi Siffre.
60	6	"Episode 6"	Stewart Morris	8 February 1975 at 8:20pm
Starring Lulu with Bernie Clifton and the Shadows singing ‘A Song for Europe 1975’. Featuring the Nigel Lythgoe Dancers and Alyn Ainsworth & His Orchestra. This week’s guests: Neville King and Neil Sedaka.
61	7	"A Song For Europe 1975"	Stewart Morris	15 February 1975 at 7:30pm
It’s Lulu featuring the Shadows performing all six songs for Europe with Alyn Ainsworth & His Orchestra.
62	8	"Episode 8"	Stewart Morris	22 February 1975 at 7:30pm
Starring Lulu with Bernie Clifton and the Shadows singing the winning ‘Song for Europe 1975’. Featuring the Nigel Lythgoe Dancers and Alyn Ainsworth & His Orchestra. This week’s guests: Billy Dainty and Gilbert Bécaud.
63	9	"Episode 9"	Stewart Morris	1 March 1975 at 7:30pm
Starring Lulu with Bernie Clifton and featuring the Nigel Lythgoe Dancers and Alyn Ainsworth & His Orchestra. This week’s guests: Roy Castle and Johnny Mathis.
64	10	"Episode 10"	Stewart Morris	8 March 1975 at 7:30pm
Starring Lulu with Bernie Clifton and featuring the Nigel Lythgoe Dancers and Alyn Ainsworth & His Orchestra. This week’s guests: Ray Alan and Charley Pride.
65	11	"Episode 11"	Stewart Morris	15 March 1975 at 7:30pm
Starring Lulu with Bernie Clifton and featuring the Nigel Lythgoe Dancers and Alyn Ainsworth & His Orchestra. This week’s guests: the Goodies, Guys 'n' Dolls and Roy Hudd.
66	12	"Episode 12"	Stewart Morris	29 March 1975 at 8:20pm
Starring Lulu with Bernie Clifton and featuring the Nigel Lythgoe Dancers and Alyn Ainsworth & His Orchestra. This week’s guests: Tessie O'Shea, David Clayton-Thomas and Bryan Marshall.
67	13	"Episode 13"	Stewart Morris	5 April 1975 at 8:25pm
Starring Lulu with Bernie Clifton and featuring the Nigel Lythgoe Dancers and Alyn Ainsworth & His Orchestra. This week’s guests: Dickie Henderson and Basil Brush.
