= It's Lulu =

It's Lulu may refer to:

- Lulu's Album (US title: It's Lulu), a 1969 album by British singer Lulu
- It's Lulu (TV series), a 1970s British television program hosted by Lulu
- "It's Lulu", a song and single from the Boo Radleys' 1995 album Wake Up!
