= Here Come the Girls (tour) =

2009–10 concert tour

- Tour by Anastacia, Chaka Khan, Heather Small and Lulu
- Promotional poster for 2009 tour
- Start date: November 21, 2009
- End date: December 13, 2010
- Legs: 2
- No. of shows: 34 in Europe
Anastacia tour chronology
Heavy Rotation Tour (2009)	Here Come the Girls (2009–10)	Resurrection Tour (2014)

Here Come the Girls was a co-headlining concert tour by American recording artists Anastacia and Chaka Khan and Scottish recording artist Lulu. Their UK tour began in November 2009. Described as a music extravaganza that mixes high octane, high camp, get up and dance songs, against a backdrop of glamour and fun, the trek became a hit, selling out all 20 dates in 2009. Due to demand, the tour continued into 2010, with English singer Heather Small replacing Chaka Khan. The tour became praised by both critics and spectators alike. The tour being initially confined to the UK, concert promoters spoke of extending it in 2011 into Continental Europe and North America, though this never materialized.

The show consisted mostly of covering songs because (collectively) the girls wanted to sing the music that inspired them versus singing only original material. The singers did solo selections but sang a majority of the songs as a trio.

Singer Anastacia described the show as,"[...] an amazing, fun party like atmosphere!!! We want everyone standing, dancing and singing along!!! We are sure to make you laugh lots and may even draw a tear or two." To promote the tour, the girls appeared on Good Morning Television, BBC Breakfast, Loose Women, Afternoon Live with Kay Burley, London Tonight and Live from Studio Five. Additionally they opened the Royal Variety Performance at the Opera House Theatre, Blackpool with a performance of "Relight My Fire".

== Setlist ==
2009
1. "Here Come the Girls" (Video Introduction) (contains excerpts from "I'm Every Woman")
2. "I'm Every Woman"
3. "One Day in Your Life"
4. "Independence"
5. "The Beat Goes On"
6. "Ain't Too Proud to Beg"
7. "Signed, Sealed, Delivered I'm Yours"
8. "I Can't Turn You Loose" (contains excerpts from "Soul Man")
9. Medley: "Stop! In the Name of Love" / "Baby Love" / "You Keep Me Hangin' On"
10. "Dancing in the Street" (Anastacia)
11. "Mercy" (Lulu)
12. "Respect" (Chaka Khan)
13. "Pop Royalty" (Dance Interlude) (contain elements of "Vogue", "Billie Jean", "Scream", "Doesn't Really Matter" and "Rhythm Nation" )
14. Medley: "Just Dance" / "Single Ladies (Put a Ring on It)" / "I Feel for You"
15. "I'm Outta Love"
16. "Proud Mary"
17. "Lady Marmalade"
18. "Hot Legs" (Dance Interlude)
19. "Ain't Nobody"
20. Medley: "Bad Girls" / "Hot Stuff"
21. "Left Outside Alone" (Anastacia)
22. "Shout" (Lulu)
23. "Through the Fire" (Chaka Khan)
24. "No More Tears (Enough Is Enough)"
25. Medley: "Disco Inferno" / "Night Fever" / "I Will Survive"
26. "Angels"

Encore

27. "Relight My Fire" (contains excerpts from "Shake Your Body (Down to the Ground)" and "Crazy in Love")
2010
1. "Here Come the Girls" (Video Introduction) (contains excerpts from "I'm Every Woman")
2. "I'm Every Woman"
3. "One Day in Your Life"
4. "Relight My Fire"
5. "Moving On Up"
6. "Ain't Too Proud to Beg"
7. "Signed, Sealed, Delivered I'm Yours"
8. "I Can't Turn You Loose" (contains excerpts from "Soul Man")
9. "Dancing in the Street" (Anastacia)
10. "Mercy" (Lulu)
11. "Valerie" (Heather Small)
12. "I'm Outta Love"
13. "Independence"
14. "One Night in Heaven"
15. "Proud Mary"
16. "I Gotta Feeling"
17. "Get the Party Started" (contains excerpts from "Sweet Dreams (Are Made of This)")
18. "Itchycoo Park" (Heather Small)
19. "Search for the Hero" (Heather Small)
20. "Empire State of Mind (Part II) Broken Down" (Anastacia)
21. "Left Outside Alone" (Anastacia)
22. "To Sir, with Love" (Lulu)
23. "Shout" (Lulu)
24. Medley: "Bad Romance" / "Just Dance" / "Poker Face" / "Paparazzi"
25. "No More Tears (Enough Is Enough)"
26. Medley: "Disco Inferno" / "Night Fever" / "I Will Survive"

Encore

27. "Angels"

== Tour dates ==
Promotional poster for 2010 leg of tour

Date	City	Country	Venue
Leg I
November 21, 2009	Edinburgh	Scotland	Usher Hall
November 23, 2009	Newcastle	England	Newcastle City Hall
November 24, 2009	Liverpool	England	Liverpool Philharmonic Hall
November 26, 2009	Sheffield	England	Sheffield City Hall
November 27, 2009	Sheffield	England	Oasis Leisure Centre
November 28, 2009	Bristol	England	Colston Hall
November 30, 2009	Cardiff	Wales	Cardiff International Arena
December 2, 2009	London	England	Hammersmith Apollo
December 4, 2009	Oxford	England	New Theatre Oxford
December 8, 2009	Nottingham	England	Nottingham Royal Concert Hall
December 10, 2009	Glasgow	Scotland	Glasgow Royal Concert Hall
December 12, 2009	Bournemouth	England	Windsor Hall
December 13, 2009	Plymouth	England	Plymouth Pavilions
December 14, 2009	Portsmouth	England	Portsmouth Guildhall
December 16, 2009	Manchester	England	Carling Apollo Manchester
December 17, 2009	Birmingham	England	Symphony Hall
December 18, 2009	Kingston upon Hull	England	Hull City Hall
December 20, 2009	Blackpool	England	Opera House Theatre
December 21, 2009	Belfast	Northern Ireland	Waterfront Hall
Leg II
November 22, 2010	Edinburgh	Scotland	Edinburgh Playhouse
November 23, 2010	Glasgow	Scotland	Clyde Auditorium
November 25, 2010	Liverpool	England	Echo Arena Liverpool
November 26, 2010	Birmingham	England	National Indoor Arena
November 27, 2010	Brighton	England	Brighton Centre
November 29, 2010	London	England	Hammersmith Apollo
November 30, 2010	London	England	Hammersmith Apollo
December 2, 2010	Cardiff	Wales	Cardiff International Arena
December 3, 2010	Portsmouth	England	Portsmouth Guildhall
December 4, 2010	Bournemouth	England	Windsor Hall
December 6, 2010	Sheffield	England	Sheffield City Hall
December 7, 2010	Manchester	England	Manchester Evening News Arena
December 8, 2010	Newcastle	England	Metro Radio Arena
December 10, 2010	Nottingham	England	Trent FM Arena Nottingham
December 12, 2010	Dublin	Ireland	The O_{2}

Cancellations and rescheduled shows

December 3, 2009	Brighton, England	Brighton Centre	Cancelled
December 21, 2009	Belfast, Northern Ireland	Waterfront Hall	This concert was originally rescheduled to December 23, 2009 due to weather but ultimately cancelled
December 13, 2010	Belfast, Northern Ireland	Odyssey Arena	Cancelled due to illness

== Box office ==
Venue	City	Tickets sold / available	Gross revenue
Manchester Evening News Arena	Manchester	2,077 / 3,400 (61%)	$121,985
The O_{2}	Dublin	1,559 / 2,000 (78%)	$102,362

== Critical reception ==
The tour received high praise from spectators of the performance by the girls, however, music critics gave the tour mixed reviews.

- Stephen Dalton (The Times) gave the performance at Colston Hall three out of five stars remarking, "Familiar fare or not, there is no substitute for the rowdy excitement of hearing evergreen anthems belted out by a great singer — or three great singers, in this case. At 61, Lulu's gravelled growl can still level entire Glaswegian tenement blocks, while 56-year-old Chaka's voluptuous contralto makes your ears feel as if they are drowning in warm treacle. Vocally, the 41-year-old Anastacia is the blandest, but she still packs a punch."
- Nik Brear (Sheffield Star) thought highly of the trio's performance at the Sheffield City Hall stating, "An incredible version of Relight My Fire closed a night where three incredible divas worked the stage from the second they stepped onto it. Each shone in their own right; no egos, not a competition – just a party."
- Matthew Hemly (The Stage) enjoyed the performance at the Hammersmith Apollo but was not pleased with veteran Chaka Kahn's performance saying, "Less impressive, sadly, is Chaka Khan, who seems to stumble over her words and forget lyrics, and who, on the whole, appears to be enjoying herself far less than her fellow performers."
- Jade Wright (Liverpool Echo) gave the trio's performance at the Liverpool Philharmonic Hall eight out of ten stars stating, "The highlights were many – Lulu's fantastic voice was per fectly suited to Mercy, Chaka Khan's to Aretha Franklin's Respect and Anastacia's, unsurprisingly, to I'm Outta Love. Played out on a stunning split level illuminated stage, these were songs to live life by."
- Edward Gleave (South Wales Evening Post) enjoyed the performance at the Cardiff International Arena remarking, "Seeing three polished performers all in the same show was a real treat. It really felt like it was three shows in one as each of the trio had their own musical style and fashion sense."
- Mike Caulfield (City Life) gave the trio's performance at the Manchester Evening News Arena four out of five stars stating, "Anastasia managed to reach every corner of the arena with her soulful voice, while Lulu shows no sign of aging – particularly apparent on her passionate cover of Duffy's retro-sounding hit Mercy."
- Aranda Rahbarkouhi (Evening Chronicle) was not impressed with the performance at the Metro Radio Arena stating, "Lulu's solo performance of Mercy had me praying for just that – and it was nothing to Shout about! It was torture and can only be described as watching a worn-out Miss Whiplash. Relight My Fire also turned into a bit of a damp squib for the diva. [..] If nothing else, these feisty females did remind me that a trip to the gym is long overdue. Either they work out or have discovered new bum-and- tum tuck pants."
- Judi Killon (The News) enjoyed the performance at the Portsmouth Guildhall stating, "The evening proved a mix of old and new, including Mercy from Lulu, Amy Winehouse's Valerie from Heather, and a terrific I'm Outta Love from Anastasia. Although all of small stature, there were no timid voices here! A terrific celebration of sisterhood."
