= Something to Shout About =

Something to Shout About may refer to:

- Something to Shout About (film), a 1943 Columbia musical film directed by Gregory Ratoff
- Something to Shout About (radio programme), a 1960–1962 British radio sitcom featuring Fenella Fielding
- Something to Shout About (album), a 1965 LP from British singer Lulu
