= The Most of Lulu =

Compilation album by Lulu
- Released: September 1971
- Length: 31:24
- Label: MfP
- Producer: Mickie Most

Lulu chronology
Melody Fair (1970)	The Most of Lulu (1971)	Lulu (1973)

The Most of Lulu is a compilation album by British pop singer Lulu, released in 1971. It was the first of Lulu's albums to chart in the UK, reaching No.15. It was released on the MfP budget record label, which the following year followed this up with The Most of Lulu Volume 2 - a re-release of 1969's Lulu's Album with one extra track. This compilation featured Lulu's hits from the late 1960s which had been released on the EMI label, therefore missing out her most well-known song "Shout".

The collection was reissued on CD by EMI in 2002 with Lulu's Album.

== Track listing ==
Side One

1. "Let's Pretend" (Paul Parnes, Paul Evans) 3:16
2. "I'm a Tiger" (Ronnie Scott, Marty Wilde) 2:46
3. "Love Loves to Love Love" (Estelle Levitt, Don Thomas) 2:04
4. "You and I" (Mark London) 2:29
5. "To Sir, With Love" (Don Black, Mark London) 2:47
6. "March" (Alan Blaikley, Ken Howard) 2:26

Side Two

1. "The Boat That I Row" (Neil Diamond) 2:50
2. "Boom Bang-a-Bang" (Alan Moorhouse, Peter Warne) 2:23
3. "Without Him" (Harry Nilsson) 2:49
4. "Me, the Peaceful Heart" (Tony Hazzard) 2:24
5. "Boy" (Alan Blaikey, Stephens) 2:30
6. "Dreary Days and Nights" (Mark London) 2:37
