= Oh Me Oh My (I'm a Fool for You Baby) =

Single by Lulu

- Side-A label of UK vinyl single

Single by Lulu

from the album New Routes
- B-side: "Sweep Around Your Own Back Door"
- Released: November 1969
- Recorded: Muscle Shoals Sound Studio, Alabama in September 1969
- Genre: Blue-eyed soul
- Length: 2:46
- Label: Atco
- Songwriter: Jim Doris
- Producers: Tom Dowd, Arif Mardin, Jerry Wexler

Lulu singles chronology
"Boom Bang-a-Bang" (1969)	"Oh Me Oh My (I'm a Fool for You Baby)" (1969)	"Hum A Song (From Your Heart)" (1970)

"Oh Me Oh My (I'm a Fool for You Baby)" is the title of a Top 30 hit single for Lulu which was recorded in September 1969 in the Muscle Shoals Sound Studio sessions for Lulu's Atco Records album debut New Routes. The song has been most notably remade by Aretha Franklin, The Raes, Buster Poindexter, Tina Arena, and Ronnie Spector on English Heart (2016).

== Lulu version ==
Lulu would later say of the Atlantic Record leaders Jerry Wexler, Tom Dowd and Arif Mardin, producers of her album New Routes: "I don't think they knew what to do with me, and the only big hit I got [off the album] was a song that I [brought in] with me" - referring to "Oh Me Oh My ...", which had been written by Jim Doris who – as Jimmy Doris – had been vocalist-guitarist for the Stoics, a band which formed in Lulu's native Glasgow in the late 1960s and whose membership had included Frankie Miller. (Doris helped contribute another song to New Routes: "After All (I Live My Life)" - co-written with Miller - and his composition "Take Good Care of Yourself" was featured on the follow-up album Melody Fair. Reportedly, Doris subsequently went into A&R work before being sidelined by mental instability, which may have been a factor in his being killed when run over by a bus in London in the late 1980s or early 1990s.

Issued as advance single from New Routes in October 1969, "Oh Me Oh My ..." represented a radical change of direction for Lulu, who was coming off her best ever UK chart placing at #2 with the Eurovision winner "Boom Bang-a-Bang". The move to a more mature sound with "Oh Me Oh My ..." was unappreciated in the UK where the track barely reached the Top 50. In the US, "Oh Me Oh My ..." ranked as high as #4 in Birmingham, Alabama in November 1969, but charted nationally as only a moderate Easy Listening hit at #36. Several performances by Lulu on US television helped break "Oh Me Oh My ..." into the Billboard Hot 100 in December 1969, and then buoyed the track as it gradually gained momentum, so that at the end of February 1970, it became Lulu's first Top 30 hit since "To Sir with Love". "Oh Me Oh My ..." peaked at #22 that March. In Cash Box it achieved a #18 peak.

In Australia the Go-Set Top 40 chart showed "Oh Me Oh My ..." peaking at #33 in January 1970. The RPM 100 chart for Canada ranked "Oh Me Oh My ..." as high as #16 in March 1970. That same month the New Zealand Listener Pop-o-meter chart ranked "Oh Me Oh My ..." as high as #12. (Note: The only national hit parade available for New Zealand 1966–1975, the Pop-o-meter chart, did not reflect sales, rather being a poll compiled from voting coupons sent in by NZ Listener readers.)

Lulu recorded a translated version of "Oh Me Oh My ..." for release in Italy, entitled "Povera Me"; the track was released in June 1970 to no apparent attention, despite a promotional junket by Lulu that July.

=== Chart performance ===
Chart (1970)	Peak position
Australia (Go Set)	33
Canada (RPM chart)	16
New Zealand (Listener)	12
UK Singles (The Official Charts Company)	47
U.S. Billboard Easy Listening	36
US Billboard Hot 100	22

== Aretha Franklin version ==
Aretha Franklin cut a version of "Oh Me Oh My (I'm a Fool For You Baby)" for her 1972 Young, Gifted and Black album which like Lulu's New Routes was produced by Arif Mardin, Jerry Wexler and Tom Dowd. Franklin's first studio album of new material since Spirit in the Dark in 1970, Young, Gifted and Black demonstrated Franklin's increasing penchant for covering pop songs and besides Lulu's "Oh Me Oh My..." Franklin gave R&B readings to songs made famous by Dusty Springfield and Dionne Warwick, specifically "A Brand New Me" and "April Fools". "Oh Me Oh My..." was used as the B-side for the album's lead single "Rock Steady", eventually receiving enough focus to reach #9 on the R&B charts crossing over to #73 Pop.

== Tina Arena version ==
"Oh Me, Oh My"

Single by Tina Arena

from the album Songs of Love & Loss 2
- Released: November 8, 2008
- Recorded: AIR Lyndhurst Hall, London in July 2008
- Genre: Pop
- Length: 3:15
- Label: EMI
- Songwriter: Jim Doris
- Producers: Duck Blackwell, Paul Guardiani

Tina Arena singles chronology
"To Sir with Love" (2007)	"Oh Me, Oh My" (2008)	"Voici les clés" (2011)

"Oh Me, Oh My" was remade in 2008 by Tina Arena for her Songs of Love & Loss 2 album recorded at AIR Lyndhurst Hall in London accompanied by conductor Simon Hale and the London Studio Orchestra in July 2008. Arena's version – entitled "Oh Me, Oh My" without the subtitle in parentheses – was issued as the album's single in digital format on November 8, 2008, by EMI Australia.

== The Gypsy Queens & Lulu Version ==
On November 3, 2023, The Gypsy Queens released "Oh Me Oh My", a second single for their album "Reminiscing with Friends", with legendary singer Lulu herself. The version was produced by multiple Grammy winner producer Larry Klein and was recorded at The Village in Los Angeles, and Metropolis Studios in London. The version also features studio musicians such as Dean Parks, James Gadson and Saxophonist Kirk Whalum. It was mastered by Bernie Grundman.

== Other versions ==
"Oh Me Oh My (I'm a Fool For You Baby)" has also been recorded by Oleta Adams, Beth Hart, Barbara Mason, Bill Medley, Buster Poindexter, Joe Tex, Irma Thomas and – as "Oh Me Oh My" – by Ann Austin, Lloyd Terrell, Renee Geyer, Rod McKuen, Benny Mardones for his 1981 album "Too Much to Lose", The Raes, B.J. Thomas and Lisa Hartman; the last named performed an abbreviated version of the song in the 1981 miniseries Jacqueline Susann's Valley of the Dolls.
