= Heaven and Earth and the Stars =

Studio album by Lulu
- Released: 1976
- Recorded: 1973–1976
- Genre: Pop, Soul
- Label: Chelsea
- Producer: Wes Farrell, John Barry; David Bowie and Mick Ronson on "The Man Who Sold the World" & "Watch That Man"

Lulu chronology
Lulu (1973)	Heaven and Earth and the Stars (1976)	Don't Take Love for Granted (1978)

Heaven and Earth and the Stars is a 1976 album by Lulu. It was the second and last of her albums to be released on the Chelsea record label, which ceased to exist in 1977. Like the previous album, it was produced by Wes Farrell, apart from two tracks "The Man Who Sold the World" and "Watch That Man" which were produced by David Bowie and Mick Ronson. The former had been a big hit for Lulu, reaching No.3 in the UK, although had been released more than two years before this album's release. Also from 1974 was Lulu's theme song for the James Bond film, The Man with the Golden Gun, produced by John Barry. Another hit single featured on this album was "Take Your Mama for a Ride", which had been a No.37 hit in 1975. Despite these inclusions, the album failed to chart, being too late to cash in on the hits. Further singles released from the album were "Boy Meets Girl" and the title track, bring the total single releases to five – half the album.

Tracks from the album were released on Compact disc in 1999 on a compilation with her previous album. Hulda Nelson was responsible for the cover design and illustration.

== Track listing ==
Side one

1. "Heaven and Earth and the Stars" (Colin Allen, George Bruno Money) – (3:08) strings arranged by Don Costa
2. "Boy Meets Girl" (Kenny Nolan) – (2:57)
3. "Mama's Little Corner of the World" (Kenny Nolan) – (3:13)
4. "The Man with the Golden Gun" (Don Black, John Barry) – (2:32) arranged and conducted by John Barry
5. "Baby I Don't Care" (Marie Lawrie, Billy Lawrie) – (4:00)
6. "Take Your Mama for a Ride, Part 1" (Kenny Nolan) – (5:26)

Side two

1. "Honey You Can't Take It Back" (Kenny Nolan) – (3:14)
2. "The Man Who Sold the World" (David Bowie) – (3:50)
3. "Watch That Man" (David Bowie) – (4:58)
4. "Old Fashion Girl" (Kenny Nolan) – (3:14)
5. "Take Your Mama for a Ride, Part 2" (Kenny Nolan) – (3:49)
