= Lulu (1973 album) =

1973 album by Lulu on Chelsea Records

Studio album by Lulu
- Released: 1973
- Recorded: 30:49
- Genre: Pop
- Label: Chelsea, Polydor
- Producer: Wes Farrell

Lulu chronology
The Most of Lulu (1971)	Lulu (1973)	Heaven and Earth and the Stars (1976)

Professional ratings
Review scores
Source	Rating
Allmusic	4/5 stars

Lulu is a 1973 album by Scottish singer Lulu. It was her first album on Chelsea Records. Produced by American songwriter Wes Farrell, the lead single was "Make Believe World". It also included covers of "Groovin'", "Do Right Woman, Do Right Man" and David Cassidy's "Could it Be Forever". The album failed to chart, although Lulu came back to prominence a few months later with the release of the hit single "The Man Who Sold the World". The single reached No.3 in the UK and became one of the singer's biggest hits, but was not included on this album. Although the album met with little chart success, reviews were good, with Allmusic retrospectively calling it "top class".

The album was released on Polydor Records in Australia. Tracks from Lulu were released on Compact disc on a compilation with her following album in 1999.

== Track listing ==
Side one

1. "Make Believe World" (Tony Macaulay) 3:25
2. "Groovin'" (Eddie Brigati Jr., Felix Cavaliere) 2:43
3. "Easy Evil" (Alan O'Day) 3:12
4. "I Wish" (Austin Roberts) 3:07
5. "A Boy Like You" (Eddie Brigati Jr., Felix Cavaliere) 2:55

Side two

1. "Hold On to What You've Got" (Miki Dallon, Tony Ritchie, Del Spence) 3:33
2. "Could It Be Forever" (Wes Farrell, Danny Janssen) 3:48
3. "Funny How Time Slips Away" (Willie Nelson) 3:12
4. "Do Right Woman, Do Right Man" (Dan Penn, Chips Moman) 2:29
5. "Help Me Help You" (Wes Farrell, Bobby Hart, Danny Janssen, Austin Roberts) 2:25

== Personnel ==
- Lulu – vocals
- Don Peake – guitar
- Max Bennett – bass guitar
- Chuck Findley – trumpet
- Victor Feldman – percussion
- Tom Hensley – piano
- Dean Parks – guitar
- Hal Blaine – drums
- Dick Hyde – trombone
- Joe Osborn – bass guitar
- Gary Coleman – percussion
- Louis Shelton – guitar
- Michael Omartian – piano
