= The Luvvers =

Scottish rock group

The Luvvers were a Scottish rock group. They are best known as the backing group to Lulu on her debut chart single, "Shout" (1964). They subsequently had a low-key career of their own before disbanding in March 1966.

== Career ==
Before they changed their name to the Luvvers (or the Luvers as credited on early UK singles pressings) for the release of "Shout", which became a UK hit single when it peaked at number seven in the early summer of 1964, the band were called the Gleneagles, with Lulu as one of the vocalists. Until their chart breakthrough they played a brand of R&B influenced music regularly in Glasgow's clubs, specifically the Lindella, where they were discovered by Tony Gordon, owner of the Phonograph disco. The original line-up was Alex Bell (vocals), Ross Neilson (lead guitar), James Dewar (rhythm guitar), Tommy Tierney (bass guitar), David Mullin (drums) and Jimmy Smith (saxophone).

They moved to London to be managed by Gordon's sister Marian Massey, and at this point Smith left and was not replaced. After the group recorded their first album Something To Shout About, Mullin was replaced by Henry Wright from the Blues Council, and they continued to tour the UK, Ireland and mainland Europe. Two package tours followed, one with the Honeycombs and Gene Vincent, and another one with Gene Pitney with the Rockin' Berries. They were compèred by the then unknown duo of Syd Little and Eddie Large. They recorded a single, "The House on the Hill" / "Most Unlovely", for the Parlophone label in 1966.

The pressure of touring made James Dewar decide to leave the group, after a performance at the Place in Edinburgh. Bell took over on rhythm guitar, now making the band a four-piece. About the same time Neilson also departed to be replaced by Dave Wendels, previously of Cliff Bennett and the Rebel Rousers. At this time they also joined the Harold Davidson Agency, and travelled to mainland Europe where they played at the Olympia with the Animals, Marianne Faithfull and the Moody Blues, and also at the Big Apple Club in Munich with Gerry and the Pacemakers.

Despite their promising debut, their next three subsequent record sales were disappointing even although their third release, "Here Comes the Night", which preceded the hit version by Them by several months, received considerable attention. The group's luck changed in August 1965 when their single "Leave a Little Love" peaked at number eight in the UK Singles Chart, and the follow-up single "Try To Understand" dented the top 25. Their last two singles however, "Tell Me Like It Is" and "Call Me", failed to make any impact.

The group split in March 1966, when Lulu became a soloist. However, before this they toured Poland with the Hollies, becoming one of the first groups to perform behind the Iron Curtain, and recorded their debut single, "The House on the Hill" b/w "Most Unlovely". After the single was recorded, Wendels left to join Tom Jones, to be replaced by Billy Bremner, later of Rockpile and the Pretenders. As bookings dried up, Wright also left, but the rest of the band continued for a while before eventually splitting up.

Although their time in the spotlight was relatively short, the Luvvers were able to claim that they had met or played with most of the top artists of the time, not least the Beatles, the Rolling Stones, the Kinks, the Yardbirds and P.J. Proby.

Until recently, Bell continued to perform with other musicians as the Luvvers before retiring to Spain to run his own diving company with his son. Wright moved back to Glasgow, having run the Rufus Stone Soul Band in Southampton for twenty years. Wendels lives in Palm Springs, California and still plays, as does Neilson who is a jeweller in London. Mullin moved to Canada, Tierney to Oslo and Bremner to Sweden. James Dewar, having found success as a member of the Robin Trower Band, died in 2002 from Cadasil hereditary stroke disorder.

== Discography ==
With Lulu:

- Singles (all on the Decca label)
  - 1964: "Shout" / "Forget Me Baby" - UK number 7
  - 1964: "Can't Hear You No More" / "I Am In Love"
  - 1964: "Here Comes The Night" / "That's Really Some Good" - UK number 50
  - 1965: "Satisfied" / "Surprise, Surprise"
  - 1965: "Leave A Little Love" / "He Don't Want Your Love" - UK number 8
  - 1965: "Try To Understand" / "Not In The Whole World" - UK number 25
  - 1965: "Tell Me Like It Is" / "Stop Fooling Around"
  - 1966: "Call Me" / "After You"
- EP
  - 1964: "Heatwave" / "What's Easy For Two Is Hard For One" / "Nothing Left To Do But Cry"
- Album (Decca)
  - Something To Shout About

as The Luvvers:

- Singles (on the Parlophone label)
  - 1966: "The House on the Hill" / "Most Unlovely"
