= New Routes (Lulu album) =

Studio album by Lulu
- Released: 16 January 1970
- Recorded: 19 September – 2 October 1969
- Studio: Muscle Shoals Sound Studio, Sheffield, Alabama
- Genre: Pop
- Label: Atlantic
- Producer: Arif Mardin, Jerry Wexler, Tom Dowd

Lulu chronology
| Lulu's Album (1969) | New Routes (1970) | Melody Fair (1970) |

Professional ratings
Review scores
| Source | Rating |
|---|---|
| Allmusic | 3/5 stars |

New Routes is an album by Scottish singer Lulu recorded between 10 September and 2 October 1969 at Muscle Shoals Sound Studio, one of that facility's earliest recordings, for a 16 January 1970 release.

New Routes, the début album release by Lulu on Atco Records, was produced by the label's top Atlantic Records production team: Tom Dowd, Arif Mardin and Jerry Wexler. Wexler had been interested in Lulu ever since 1964, when his business associate Bert Berns had recorded her on "Here Comes the Night". Her 1969 signing to Atlantic's Atco label was facilitated by Lulu's becoming engaged to Maurice Gibb of Atco's top musical artists, the Bee Gees.

New Routes was preceded by the October 1969 release of the track "Oh Me Oh My (I'm a Fool for You Baby)", which gradually reached 22 on the Billboard Hot 100 in February 1970. New Routes debuted on Billboard 200 chart in February, peaking at 88. The album produced no further A-sides; in May 1970 the track "Where's Eddie" was utilized to back "Hum a Song (From Your Heart)", the advance single from the Melody Fair album.

== Track listing ==
=== Side one ===
1. "Marley Purt Drive" (Barry Gibb, Robin Gibb, Maurice Gibb) - 3:23
2. "In the Morning" (Barry Gibb) - 3:30
3. "People in Love" (Eddie Hinton, Grady Smith) - 2:47
4. "After All (I Live My Life)" (Jim Doris, Frankie Miller) - 3:17
5. "Feelin' Alright" (Dave Mason) - 3:05

=== Side two ===
1. "Dirty Old Man" (Delaney Bramlett, Mac Davis) - 2:22
2. "Oh Me Oh My (I'm a Fool for You Baby)" (Jim Doris) - 2:46
3. "Is That You Love" (Jackie Avery, John Farris) - 2:44
4. "Mr. Bojangles" (Jerry Jeff Walker) - 3:10
5. "Where's Eddie" (Donnie Fritts, Eddie Hinton) - 3:08
6. "Sweep Around Your Own Back Door" (Fran Robins) - 2:41

== Personnel ==
- Duane Allman - guitar on side one: 1, 4 and side two: 1, 4, 6
- Barry Beckett - keyboards
- Jim Dickinson - guitar, piano
- Tom Dowd - producer
- Cornell Dupree, Charlie Freeman, Eddie Hinton - guitar
- Martin Greene - engineer
- David Hood, Tommy McClure - bass guitar
- Roger Hawkins - drums
- Jimmy Johnson - engineer, guitar
- Lulu - vocals (There are backing vocals on this album, starting at 0:32 of the very first song).
- Arif Mardin - producer
- Michael Utley - organ
- Jerry Wexler - producer
- Stephen Paley - photography
