= Together (Lulu album) =

Studio album by Lulu
- Released: 21 May 2002
- Genre: Pop
- Label: Mercury
- Producer: Bill Padley

Lulu chronology
Independence (1993)	Together (2002)	The Greatest Hits (2003)

Together is a 2002 album recorded by Scottish pop star Lulu as an album of duets with various artists, including Elton John, Paul McCartney, Joe Cocker, Cliff Richard, Westlife and Ronan Keating, amongst others. The album reached No. 4 in the UK Albums Chart and was certified Gold by the BPI.

== Track listing ==
1. "Teardrops" with Elton John (Cecil Womack, Linda Womack) – 4:48
2. "Shame Shame Shame" with Atomic Kitten (Sylvia Robinson) – 3:27
3. "Inside Thing (Let 'Em In)" with Paul McCartney (Paul McCartney, Lukas Burton, Billy Lawrie, Lulu) – 4:48
4. "We've Got Tonight" with Ronan Keating (Bob Seger) – 3:40
5. "Sail On, Sailor" with Sting (Brian Wilson, Tandyn Almer, Ray Kennedy, Van Dyke Parks, Jack Rieley) – 3:27
6. "Back at One" with Westlife (Brian McKnight) – 4:11
7. "To Sir, with Love" with Samantha Mumba (Donald Black, Mark London) – 2:57
8. "With You I'm Born Again" with Marti Pellow (Carol Connors, David Shire) – 3:37
9. "The Prayer" with Russell Watson (Bayer, Foster) – 4:32
10. "Reunited" with Cliff Richard (Dino Fekaris, Freddie Perren) – 4:03
11. "I'm Back for More" with Bobby Womack (Ken Stover) – 5:08
12. "Now That the Magic Has Gone" with Joe Cocker (John Miles) – 5:01
13. "Phunk Phoolin" with Kerphunk (Adlam, Mel London, Rev. C.L. Moore) – 3:43
14. "Relight My Fire" with Take That (Dan Hartman) – 4:09

== Certifications ==
Region	Certification	Certified units/sales
United Kingdom (BPI)	Gold	100,000^{^}
^{^} Shipments figures based on certification alone.
