= Lulu's Back in Town (TV series) =

1968 British television series

Lulu's Back in Town is a television program broadcast on the BBC in 1968.

== Episodes ==
No.	Title	Directed by	Original release date
1	"Episode 1"	John Ammonds	21 May 1968
Lulu with her special guests Frank Bough, Rolf Harris and the Ladybirds with Alyn Ainsworth & His Orchestra.
2	"Episode 2"	John Ammonds	28 May 1968
Lulu with her special guests the Alan Price Set, Peter West and the Ladybirds with Peter Knight & His Orchestra.
3	"Episode 3"	John Ammonds	4 June 1968
Lulu with her special guests Peter Nero, Joe Cusatis, Gene Cherico, Hattie Jacques and the Ladybirds with Peter Knight & His Orchestra.
4	"Episode 4"	John Ammonds	11 June 1968
Lulu with her special guests Les Dawson, the Everly Brothers and the Ladybirds with Peter Knight & His Orchestra.
5	"Episode 5"	John Ammonds	18 June 1968
Lulu with her special guests Frankie Vaughan, Reg Varney and the Ladybirds with Peter Knight & His Orchestra.
6	"Episode 6"	John Ammonds	2 July 1968
Lulu with her special guests Lou Rawls, Frank Windsor and the Ladybirds with Peter Knight & His Orchestra.
7	"Episode 7"	John Ammonds	2 July 1968
Lulu with her special guests Georgie Fame, Clive Dunn and the Ladybirds with Johnny Harris & His Orchestra.
