= Lulu (singer) =

Scottish singer (born 1948)

Lulu CBE
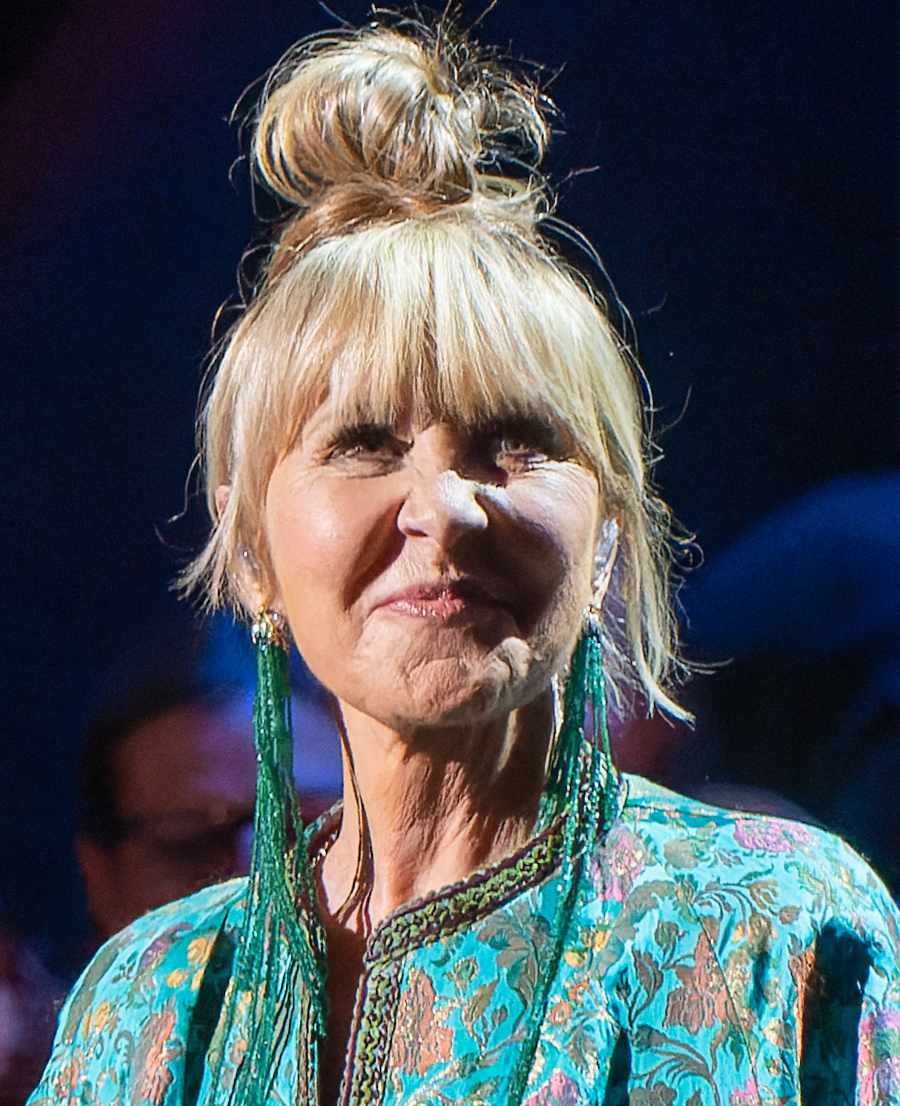
- Lulu performing at The Sound of 007, 2022

Background information
- Also known as: Lulu Kennedy-Cairns
- Born: Marie McDonald McLaughlin Lawrie; 3 November 1948 (age 78); Lennoxtown, Stirlingshire, Scotland
- Origin: Glasgow, Scotland
- Genres: Pop; pop rock; blue-eyed soul
- Occupations: Singer; songwriter; actress; television personality
- Instrument: Vocals
- Years active: 1964–present
- Labels: Decca; Atco; Music for Pleasure; Mercury
- Formerly of: Lulu & the Luvvers
- Spouses: Maurice Gibb (m. 1969; div. 1975) John Frieda (m. 1977; div. 1991)
- Website: luluofficial.com
- Children: 1

Lulu Kennedy-Cairns (born Marie McDonald McLaughlin Lawrie; 3 November 1948) is a Scottish singer, songwriter, actress and television personality whose career is in its seventh decade. Her debut single, a cover version of The Isley Brothers song "Shout", reached the top ten of the UK Singles Chart in 1964. In 1967, she rose to international prominence after appearing in the film To Sir, with Love, singing the theme song, the melody written by Mark London, which topped the Billboard Hot 100 chart in the United States for five consecutive weeks and became America's biggest-selling single of 1967.

During the 1960s, she achieved another five top-ten hits on the UK Singles Chart, including "Boom Bang-a-Bang", which jointly won the Eurovision Song Contest 1969. From 1968–1973, she hosted her own television shows including Lulu's Back in Town (1968), Happening for Lulu (1968–1969) and It's Lulu (1970–1973). With a sought after powerful voice, she was commissioned in 1974 to perform the title song for the James Bond film The Man with the Golden Gun. In 1993, Lulu had her first number-one single on the UK Singles Chart: "Relight My Fire", a collaboration with Take That.

In 2002, she achieved her most recent top-ten entry on the UK Singles Chart when her collaboration with Irish singer Ronan Keating, "We've Got Tonight", peaked at number four. She has released 15 studio albums, with Together (2002), being her highest-charting, peaking at number two on the Scottish albums charts and number four on the UK albums chart. The album was subsequently certified Gold by the British Phonographic Industry (BPI). She was appointed Officer of the Order of the British Empire (OBE) in 2000 Birthday Honours and Commander of the Order of the British Empire (CBE) in the 2021 Birthday Honours for services to music, entertainment and charity.

== Life and career ==
Marie McDonald McLaughlin Lawrie was born at the maternity unit of Lennox Castle Hospital in Lennoxtown in 1948, and grew up in Glasgow, where she attended Thomson Street Primary School and Onslow Drive School. She lived in the Gallowgate area of the city for a while before moving to Garfield Street, Dennistoun. When she was 12 or 13, she and her manager approached a band called the Bellrocks seeking stage experience as a singer. She appeared with them every Saturday night. Alex Thomson, the group's bass player, said that even then her voice was remarkable. She has two brothers and a sister, and her father, who died at 71, was reportedly a heavy drinker. Aged 14, she received the stage name "Lulu" from her future manager Marion Massey, who commented: "Well, all I know is that she's a real lulu (Note: Definition of lulu by Merriam-Webster: slang: one that is remarkable or wonderful) of a kid."

In August 2017, Lulu's family history was the subject of an episode in the UK series Who Do You Think You Are? The research showed that her mother had been brought up by another family. The investigation into her genealogy showed that Lulu's maternal grandparents had different religions. Her grandfather Hugh Cairns was a Catholic and her grandmother, Helen Kennedy, was a Protestant. Cairns had been a member of a Catholic gang and was found in the research to have been in and out of prison at the time of the birth of Lulu's mother. Kennedy was found to be the daughter of a Worthy Mistress of the Ladies' Orange Lodge 52. The discovery explained why the two families had opposed the union between Kennedy and Cairns.

=== Early chart hits ===
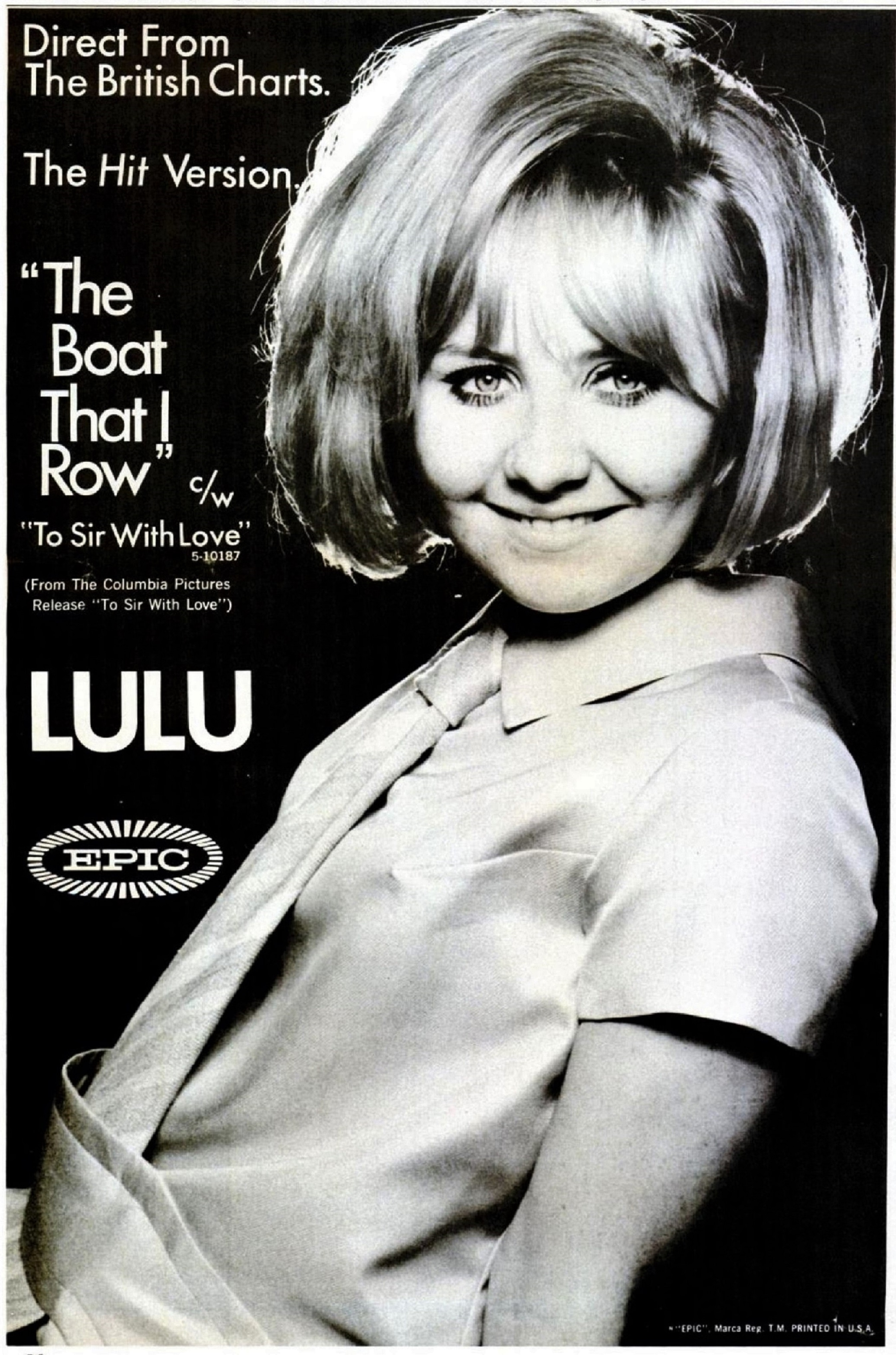
Billboard advertisement, 24 June 1967

In 1964, under the wing of Marion Massey, she was signed to Decca Records. While only fifteen, her version of the Isley Brothers' "Shout", credited to "Lulu & the Luvvers", and delivered in a raucous but mature voice, peaked at No. 7 on the UK chart. Massey guided her career for more than 25 years, for most of which time they were partners in business, and Massey's husband Mark London produced some of Lulu's recordings.

After the success of "Shout", Lulu's next charting single was "Leave a Little Love" in 1965, which returned her to the UK Top Ten. Her next record, "Try to Understand", made the Top 40.

In 1966, Lulu toured Poland with the Hollies, being the first British female singer to appear live behind the Iron Curtain. In the same year, she recorded two German-language tracks, "Wenn du da bist" and "So fing es an", for the Decca Germany label. All her Decca recordings were made available in 2009 on a 2-CD set entitled Shout!, issued on RPM Records. After two hit singles with the Luvvers, Lulu embarked on a solo career.

After failing to reach the chart in 1966, Lulu left Decca and signed with Columbia, to be produced by Mickie Most. She returned to the UK singles chart in April 1967, reaching No. 6 with "The Boat That I Row", written by Neil Diamond. All seven singles she cut with Mickie Most made the UK Singles Chart, ending with "Boom Bang-A-Bang" reaching number 2 in 1969. When Most died in 2003, Lulu was full of praise for him and told the BBC that they had been very close.

Lulu made her acting debut in 1967 To Sir, with Love, a British vehicle for Sidney Poitier. Lulu both acted in the film and sang the title song, with which she had a major hit in the United States, reaching No. 1. "To Sir with Love" became the best-selling single of 1967 in the United States. It sold well in excess of one million copies and was awarded a gold disc, being ranked by Billboard magazine as the number 1 song of the year. In the UK, "To Sir With Love" was released on the B-side of "Let's Pretend", a No. 11 hit.

=== Television series ===
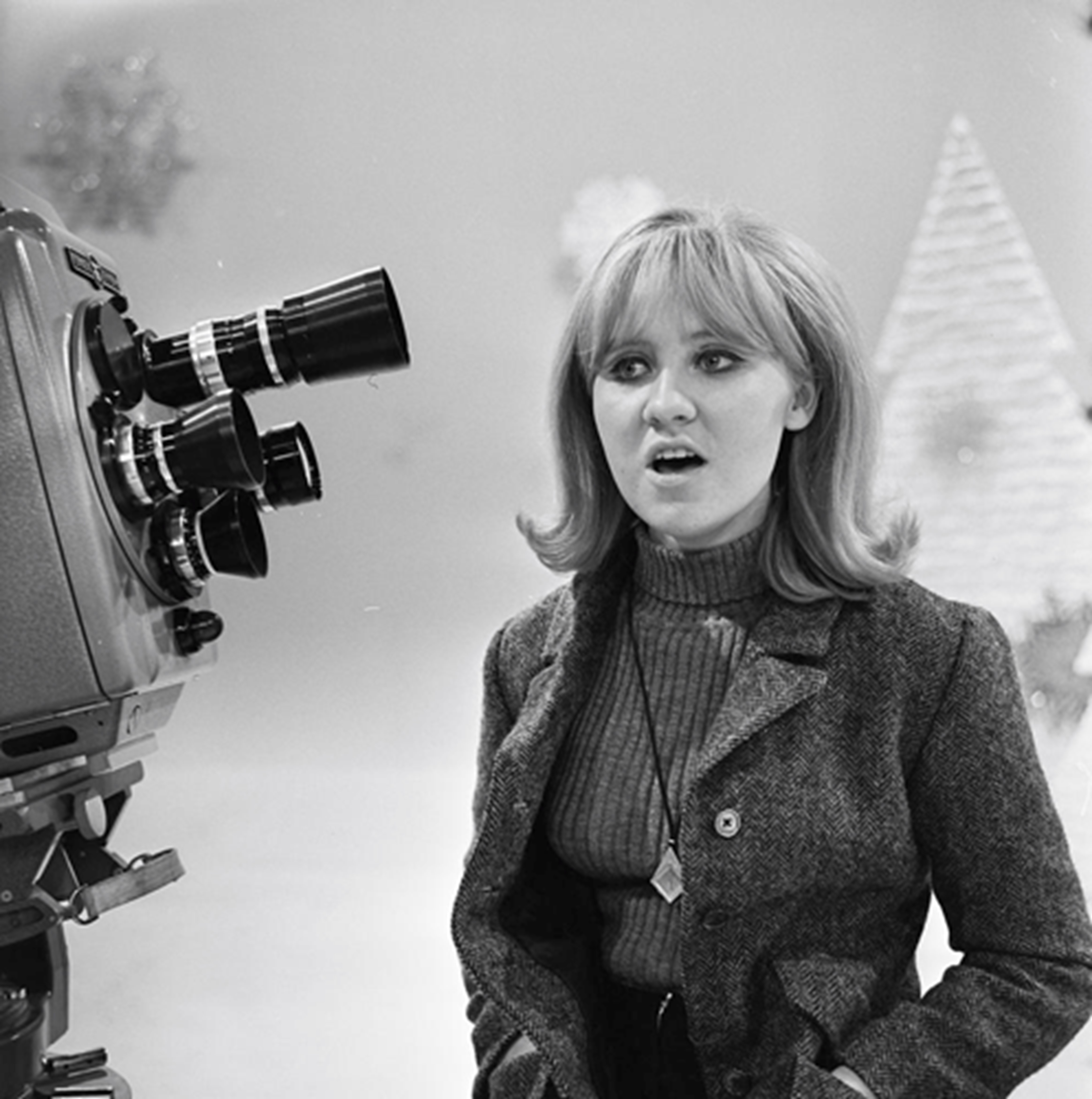
Lulu performing "Leave a Little Love" and "He's Sure The Boy I Love", on Dutch TV-programme Fanclub, 11 December 1965

In the late 1960s, Lulu's pop career in the UK thrived and she had several television series of her own. Her first BBC series aired in 1965 on BBC2, where she co-hosted Gadzooks! It's The In-Crowd, with Alan David, completing the run as solo host under the rebranded Gadzooks! In 1966, she made regular appearances on BBC1's Stramash! After appearing again on BBC2 in 1967, in a successful TV series Three of a Kind, that featured music and comedy, Lulu was given her own BBC1 TV series in 1968, which ran annually until 1975 under various titles, including Lulu's Back in Town, Happening for Lulu, It's Lulu and Lulu. The series often featured resident guests, including Adrienne Posta, Roger Kitter, Paul Greenwood and Pan's People, along with dance troupes choreographed by Nigel Lythgoe and Dougie Squires. The 1972 series was billed as It's Lulu... Not to mention Dudley Moore, with Dudley Moore and his trio appearing in each of the thirteen shows. Bernie Clifton was her resident guest for the last of the BBC series, airing from January to April 1975. Her BBC series included music and comedy sketches and appearances by star guests.

One episode, from January 1969, is remembered for an unruly live appearance from the Jimi Hendrix Experience. During that appearance, after playing about two minutes of "Hey Joe", Hendrix stopped and announced, "We'd like to stop playing this rubbish and dedicate a song to Cream, regardless of what kind of group they may be in, dedicate to Eric Clapton, Ginger Baker, and Jack Bruce." Hendrix and his band then broke into "Sunshine of Your Love". The studio director signalled for Hendrix to stop, but he continued. Hendrix was told he would never work at the BBC again, but was unrepentant. He told his girlfriend Kathy Etchingham: "I'm not going to sing with Lulu. I'd look ridiculous."

Concurrently with her TV series, Lulu also hosted several "one-off" specials. They included Lulu At Bern's Restaurant in 1969, a show recorded in Sweden with the Young Generation, 1970's The Young Generation Meet Lulu (also recorded in Sweden), and Bruce Forsyth Meets Lulu in 1975.

=== Eurovision Song Contest ===
On 29 March 1969, Lulu represented the United Kingdom in the Eurovision Song Contest, performing the song "Boom Bang-a-Bang", written by Peter Warne and Alan Moorhouse. The song was chosen from a selection of six by viewers of her BBC1 variety series Happening for Lulu, and on a special show hosted by Michael Aspel in which she performed all six one after another. One song, "I Can't Go On...", written by Elton John and Bernie Taupin, came last in the postcard vote but was later recorded by Cilla Black, Sandie Shaw, Polly Brown and Elton John himself, as well as by Lulu. In Madrid, Lulu was accompanied by Sue and Sunny while the orchestra was conducted by Lulu's musical director Johnny Harris. Lulu later recalled:

I had a series on TV, and Bill Cotton was the Head of Light entertainment [at the BBC], and he said to my manager: "I'd like her to do the Eurovision Song Contest, on the series". And she came to me and I went "Why? What do I want to do that for?"... and she said that he said that "you'll get good ratings, and he is the boss, and he wants you to have good ratings. Maybe I could have said no, but I felt I didn't really have a choice in the matter. And I thought... I was full of myself, thinking ratings isn't what it's all about... But, you know, Elton John and Bernie Taupin wrote a great song that didn't go through... I had this amazing band, like 20 pieces. We did all these different songs... every single one of us said "Which one is gonna win? Which one is gonna win?" and we all laughed and went: "Bet you it's that Boom boom bang a bang a bang a bang..." But then it won. Somehow there was an intelligence working there... and it was a huge success.

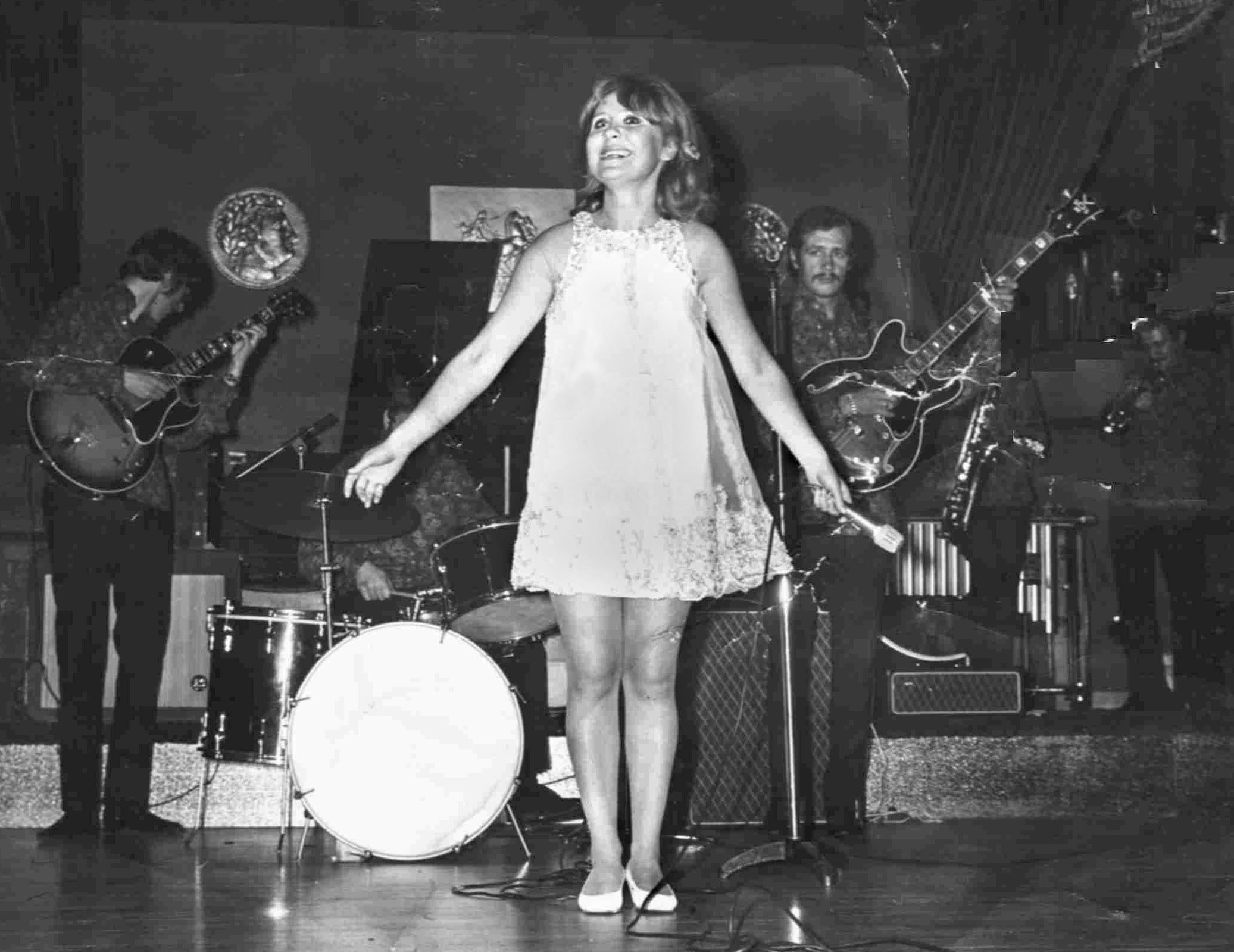
Lulu and the Echoes in Glasgow in 1967

"Boom Bang-a-Bang" won, though three other songs, from Spain, ("Vivo cantando" by Salomé), the Netherlands, ("De troubadour" by Lenny Kuhr) and France, ("Un jour, un enfant" by Frida Boccara) tied with her on 18 votes each. The rules were subsequently altered to prevent such ties in future years, but the result caused Austria, Portugal, Norway, Sweden and Finland not to enter the 1970 contest. Lulu's song came out the best in sales, with German, French, Spanish and Italian versions alongside the original English. Later she told John Peel; "I know it's a rotten song, but I won, so who cares? I'd have sung "Baa, Baa, Black Sheep" standing on my head if that's what it took to win.... I am just so glad I didn't finish second like all the other Brits before me, that would have been awful." Despite her dislike it is her second biggest UK hit to date, reaching number 2 on the chart in 1969.

In 1975, Lulu herself hosted the BBC's A Song for Europe, the qualifying heat for the Eurovision Song Contest, in which the Shadows performed six shortlisted songs. In 1981, she joined other Eurovision winners at a charity gala held in Norway, and she was a panellist at the 1989 UK heat, offering views on two of the competing eight entries. In 2009, she provided comment and support to the six acts shortlisted to represent the UK at Eurovision 2009 on BBC1 TV.

Just weeks before her 1969 Eurovision appearance, Lulu had married Maurice Gibb of the Bee Gees in a ceremony in Gerrards Cross. Maurice's older brother Barry was opposed to their marriage as he believed them to be too young. Their honeymoon in Mexico had to be postponed because of Lulu's Eurovision commitment. Their careers and his heavy drinking forced them apart and they divorced in 1973, but remained on good terms.

From 30 June to 2 July 1967, Lulu appeared with the Monkees at the Empire Pool, Wembley, and her brief romance with Davy Jones of the Monkees during a concert tour of the United States in March 1968 received much publicity in the UK press. In 1969, Lulu recorded New Routes, a new album, at Muscle Shoals studios in Muscle Shoals, Alabama: several of the songs, including a version of Jerry Jeff Walker's "Mr. Bojangles", featured slide guitarist Duane Allman. The album was recorded for Atlantic's Atco label and produced by Jerry Wexler, Tom Dowd and Arif Mardin.

=== 1970s: James Bond theme ===
Lulu began 1970 by appearing on the BBC's review of the 1960s music scene Pop Go the Sixties, performing "Boom Bang-A-Bang" live on BBC1 on 31 December 1969. She recorded another Jerry Wexler, Tom Dowd and Arif Mardin album in the US, Melody Fair, and scored a US Top 30 hit, "Oh Me Oh My (I'm a Fool for You Baby)", (later covered by Aretha Franklin, Tina Arena, Buster Poindexter, and John Holt) and collaborated with the Dixie Flyers on "Hum a Song (From Your Heart)".

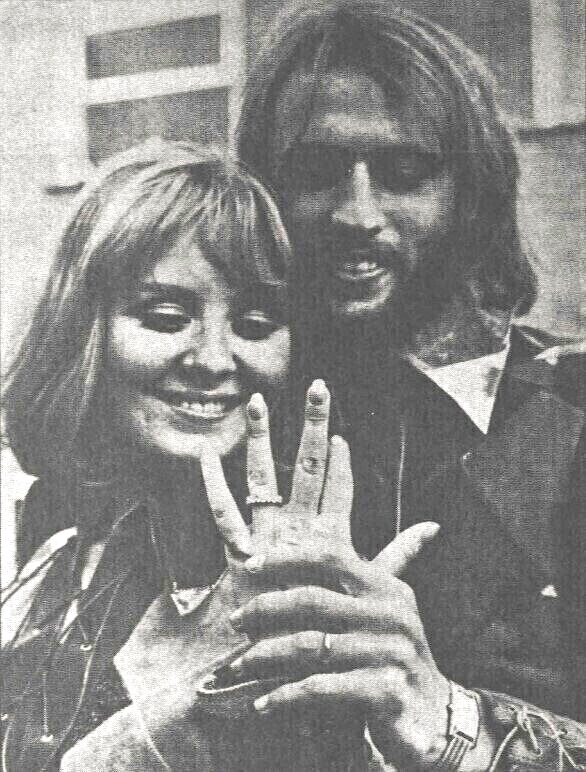
Lulu and her first husband, Maurice Gibb, c. 1970

Four more German-language tracks ("Ich brauche deine Liebe", "Wach' ich oder träum' ich", "Warum tust du mir weh", and "Traurig, aber wahr") were recorded on the Atlantic/WEA label. She was the subject of This Is Your Life on 10 May 1972, when she was surprised by Eamonn Andrews.

Lulu was one of the main artists invited to appear on the BBC's anniversary show Fifty Years Of Music in 1972. The same year she starred in the Christmas pantomime Peter Pan at the Opera House, Manchester, and repeated her performance at the London Palladium in 1975. She returned to the same role in different London-based productions from 1987 to early 1989. She made an appearance on the Morecambe and Wise Show in 1973, singing "All the Things You Are" and "Happy Heart". Also in 1972, Lulu made a brief but memorable appearance, alongside Ringo Starr, on Monty Python's Flying Circus. She and Starr fight with Michael Palin, in his "It's Man" character as a talk show host whose programme goes awry.

On 27 May 1974, BBC1 screened Bruce Forsyth Meets Lulu a special variety TV show for the UK bank holiday. In 1974, she performed the title song for the James Bond film The Man with the Golden Gun. Two slightly different versions of the song were used, at the start and end respectively; James Bond was mentioned in the end version. Released as a single, it is the only Bond film title track not to chart as a single in either the United Kingdom or the United States.

In the same year, Lulu covered David Bowie's songs "The Man Who Sold the World" and "Watch That Man". Bowie and Mick Ronson produced the recordings. Bowie played saxophone and provided backing vocals. Rumours of a brief affair between him and Lulu were confirmed in her 2002 autobiography. "The Man Who Sold the World" became her first Top 10 hit in five years, peaking at No. 3 in the UK chart in February 1974, and was a Top 10 hit in several other European countries. She recorded other songs with Bowie, including his "Dodo," that were never officially released. In 1975, she released the disco single "Take Your Mama For A Ride", which peaked in the UK chart at No. 37, remaining in the Top 75 for four weeks.

On 31 December 1976, Lulu performed "Shout" on BBC1's A Jubilee of Music, celebrating British pop music, as part of Queen Elizabeth II's impending Silver jubilee celebrations. In 1977, Lulu became interested in Siddha Yoga and married hairdresser John Frieda. They divorced in 1991. They had one son, Jordan Frieda.

=== 1980s: Other ventures ===
Lulu's chart success waned in the 1980s but she remained in the public eye, acting and hosting a long-running radio show on London's Capital Radio station. She was associated with Freemans fashion catalogue during the late 1970s and early 1980s. In 1979 she recorded for Elton John's label The Rocket Record Company and released "I Love to Boogie".

Notable London stage appearances came in the early 1980s and included Andrew Lloyd Webber's Song and Dance and the Royal National Theatre's Guys and Dolls. Lulu damaged her vocal cords while performing in the Lloyd Webber show, requiring surgery that threatened her singing voice. She co-hosted a revived series of Oh Boy! for ITV in the early 1980s. In 1981, she returned to the US chart with "I Could Never Miss You (More Than I Do)", a Top 20 hit that also reached No. 2 on the Adult Contemporary chart despite stalling at No. 62 in the UK. Early the following year, she had a more modest US hit with "If I Were You", which just missed the Top 40, appeared in the video for "Ant Rap" alongside Adam and the Ants, and was nominated for a Grammy for "Who's Foolin' Who" from the "Lulu" album.

She won the Rear of the Year award in 1983 and rerecorded a number of her songs. They included "Shout", which reached the Top 10 in 1986 in the UK, securing her a spot on Top of the Pops. Lulu was one of only two performers (Cliff Richard being the other) to have sung on Top of the Pops in each of the five decades that the show ran. A follow-up single to "Shout", an updated version of Millie's 1960s hit "My Boy Lollipop", failed to chart and Lulu stopped recording until 1992, focusing instead on TV, acting and live performances. The two tracks were released on the Jive Records label. Lulu has had releases on the Decca, Columbia, Atco, Polydor, Chelsea, Alfa, Jive, Dome, RCA, Mercury and Universal labels. She has also released singles for GTO, Atlantic, Globe, EMI, Concept, Lifestyle, Utopia and Rocket, and Epic in the US.

In 1985 her first autobiography, Lulu : Her Autobiography, was published. On television, she replaced Julie Walters as Adrian Mole's mother in The Secret Diary of Adrian Mole in 1987. In 1989 and 1990 she voiced the title character in the animated series Nellie the Elephant on ITV. In 1989, Lulu and her manager of 25 years, Marion Massey, parted company. During their twenty-five year association, Massey and Lulu were equal partners as a business enterprise but, encouraged by her husband John Frieda, Lulu ended their business association in 1989 as she was frustrated that she was no longer seen as a recording artist and Massey was unable to further her recording career.

=== 1990s: Musical comeback ===
In 1993, Lulu made a recording comeback with the single "Independence", which reached No. 11 in the UK Singles Chart. It was the title track from the Independence album, and all four singles released from the album reached the lower ends of the UK chart, as did two later singles, released in 1994. Her second single after "Independence" was "I'm Back for More", a duet with soul singer Bobby Womack, which charted at No. 27. The album was not successful, peaking at No. 67 in the UK Albums Chart. Also in 1993, the song "I Don't Wanna Fight", co-written by Lulu, her brother Billy Lawrie, and Steve DuBerry, became an international hit for Tina Turner.

Later that year, she guested on the cover version of the Dan Hartman song "Relight My Fire", with boy band Take That. The single reached No. 1 on the UK Singles Chart, and Lulu appeared as Take That's supporting act on their 1994 tour. At that time, she also appeared as an unhappy public relations client of Edina Monsoon in two episodes of the BBC television programme Absolutely Fabulous, and teamed with French and Saunders many times, including their send up of the Spice Girls (the Sugar Lumps) for Comic Relief in 1997, when she took the role of "Baby Spice", mimicking Emma Bunton. An album, provisionally titled Where the Poor Boys Dance, was completed in late 1997 and due for release in early 1998, but was postponed by the record label, Mercury. A single, "Hurt Me So Bad", was released in April 1999, which rose no higher than No. 42 in the UK and, a year later, the title track from the cancelled album reached No. 24, with Lulu appearing on Top of the Pops to promote it.

In 1999, Lulu returned to BBC One to host the Saturday night National Lottery game show Red Alert. The theme song, sung by Lulu, was released as a single but only reached No.59 in the UK. She also co-wrote and recorded a duet with UK pop singer Kavana entitled "Heart Like the Sun", but it was not released commercially until Kavana's 2007 "greatest hits" collection, Special Kind of Something: The Best of....

=== 2000: Return to prominence ===
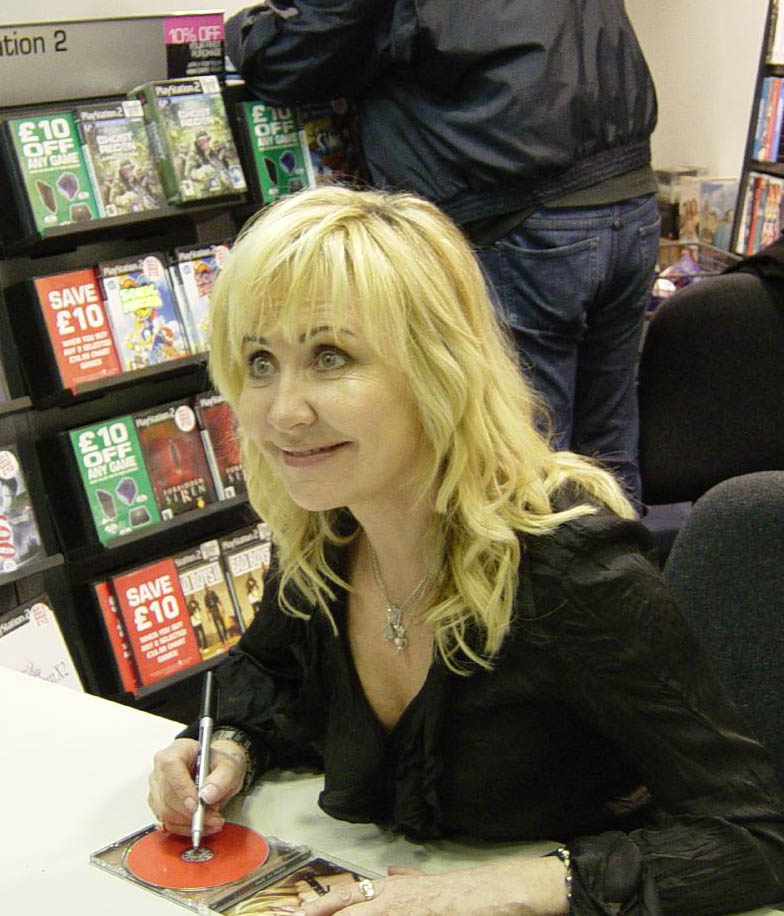
Lulu in 2004

Now known as Lulu Kennedy-Cairns (her late mother's birth name before she was adopted by the McDonald family), in 2000 she was awarded an OBE by Queen Elizabeth II. Lulu's autobiography, published in 2002, was titled I Don't Want to Fight after the hit song she and her brother wrote with songwriter Steve DuBerry for Tina Turner, a song that Lulu herself released in 2003 as part of her album The Greatest Hits. Her 2002 gold album, Together, was a collection of duets with Elton John and Paul McCartney among others, tracks from which were performed in a high-profile TV special for ITV, An Audience With Lulu, which saw Lulu reunited with her first husband Maurice Gibb for a live performance of "First of May". Her rendition of "We've Got Tonight", with Ronan Keating, reached No. 4 in the United Kingdom, matching the chart peak of the Together album.

In 2000, Lulu sat on the 5,387,862nd and final classic Mini when it came off the production line. In the ceremony at the Birmingham factory, Lulu drove a red Mini Cooper, registration 1959–2000, off the track to music from The Italian Job, the 1969 film in which several Mini Coopers featured prominently. In 2004, she released the album Back on Track and went on a UK-wide tour to celebrate forty years in the music business. The album charted at No. 68. In late 2004, she returned to radio as the host of a two-hour radio show on BBC Radio 2, playing an eclectic blend of music from the 1950s to the 2000s. In 2005, Lulu released A Little Soul in Your Heart, a collection of soul classics that entered the UK Albums Chart at No. 28. In March 2006, she launched her official MySpace profile. She also appeared on the popular British comedy programme The Kumars at No. 42.

Lulu continued to act occasionally and starred alongside Tom Courtenay and Stephen Fry in the British film Whatever Happened to Harold Smith? She also appeared in the BBC's reality TV show Just the Two of Us in 2006 as a judge, alongside Trevor Nelson, CeCe Sammy and Stewart Copeland. She was replaced by Tito Jackson for Series Two in 2007. In late June and early July 2006, she appeared on Take That's tour of the UK and Ireland to perform their song "Relight My Fire". She appeared on American Idol Season 6 on 20 March 2007 as a mentor for the female contestants, and the following night performed "To Sir With Love". Later in 2007, she appeared in the UK as a guest for Jools Holland in a series of concerts and features, and on Holland's CD release "Best of Friends", performing "Where Have All the Good Guys Gone?" Lulu's complete Atco recordings, made between 1969 and 1972, were released on 12 November 2007. The two-CD set included previously unreleased and demo versions of some of her recordings from this period. In December 2007 she released a download single on iTunes in the UK, called "Run Rudolph Run". At this time Lulu was also promoting a range of beauty products on QVC, called "Time Bomb", and appeared on a 2007 Christmas television advert for the Morrisons supermarket chain in the UK.

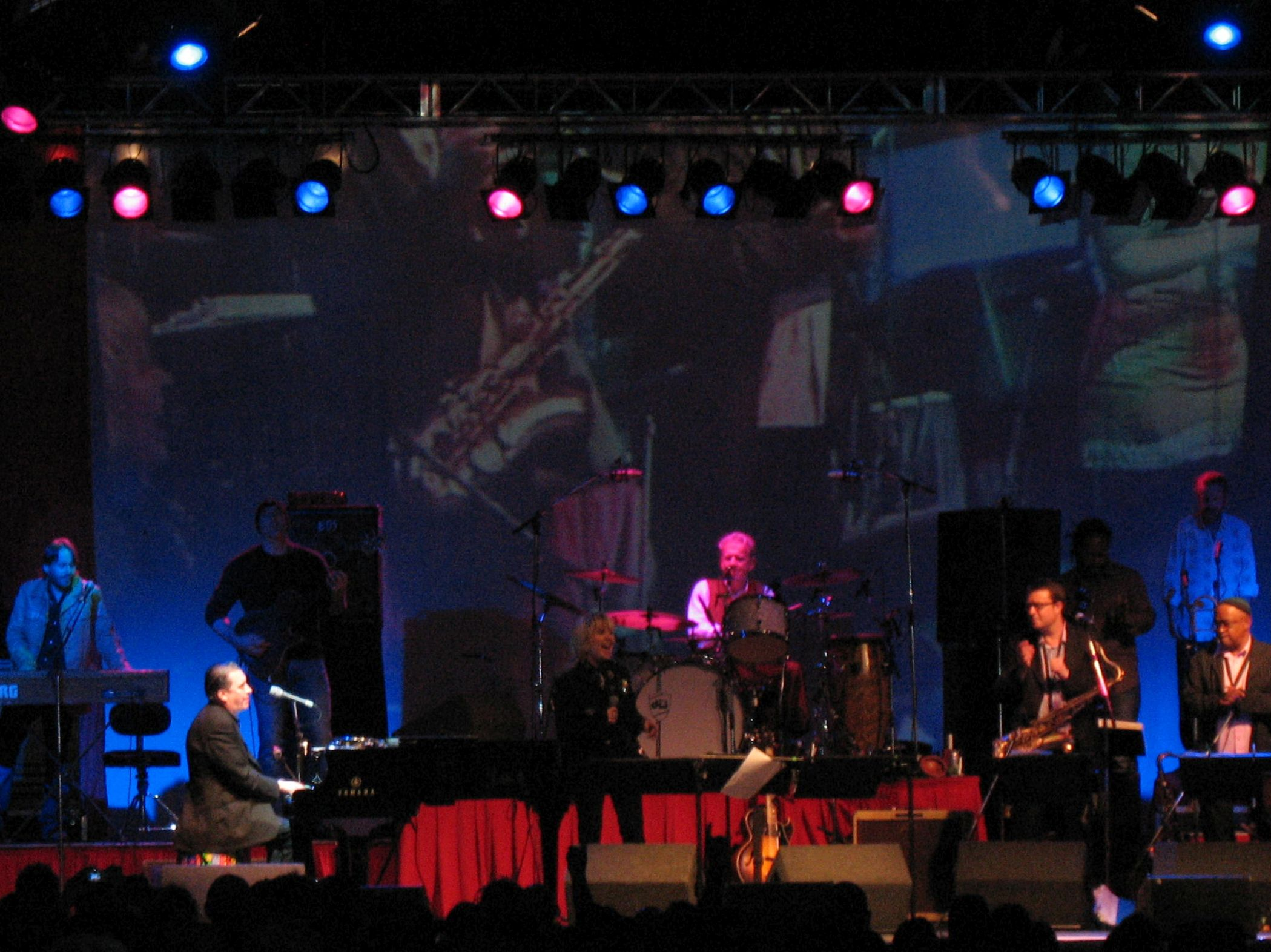
Performing with Jools Holland at Borde Hill Garden 23 June 2007.

In November 2008, Lulu was announced as one of a number of Scottish celebrities to feature in the advertising campaign for Homecoming Scotland, a year-long event to encourage people around the world with Scottish heritage to return to Scotland. Also in November 2008, Lulu posted the following message on her website, celebrating the election of Barack Obama as President of the United States: "Barack Obama Is In – Yippee, now we have got hope in the World. I've just turned 60, Obama is the new president of the USA and I think its going to be a fantastic year. Love Lu X". In the 1979, 1983 and 1987 UK general elections, Lulu had been a supporter of Prime Minister Margaret Thatcher's Conservative Party.

In January 2009, Lulu began a four-week stint as an advisor/coach on the BBC show Eurovision: Your Country Needs You, helping to choose the singer to represent the UK at the Eurovision Song Contest 2009. In the summer of 2009, Lulu guest presented on STV's daily lifestyle show The Hour, alongside main presenter Stephen Jardine. She appeared between 27 and 31 July. The Scottish magazine programme airs weekdays at 5pm. Around this time she pitched her range of "Lulu's" anti-ageing products and other cosmetics through the home shopping channel QVC (UK), using her youthful appearance as a promotional tool. After appearing at an ABBA tribute concert in Hyde Park, London during September 2009, Lulu announced that she would be touring the UK in a Here Come the Girls alongside Chaka Khan and Anastacia. The trio promoted the concert series on UK TV, ahead of the first performance in November 2009, which took on twenty different dates.

=== 2010s: Touring ===
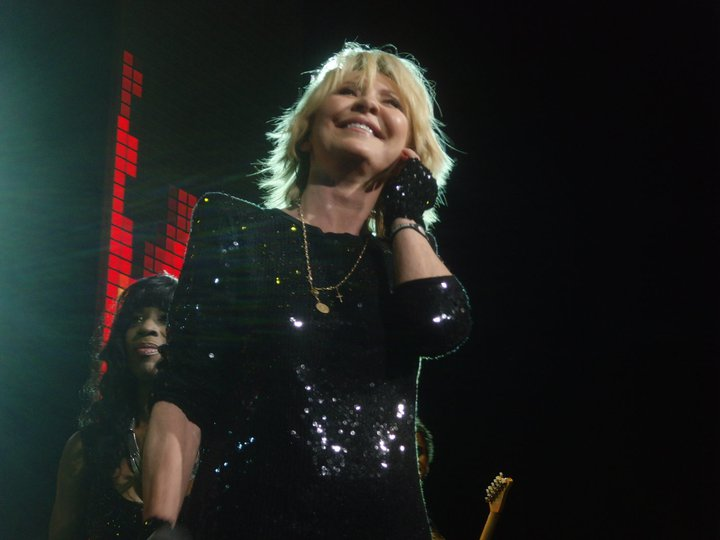
Lulu performing in Glasgow in 2010 during the Here Come the Girls tour

In early 2010, Lulu sang the theme "The Word Is Love" for the film Oy Vey! My Son Is Gay!! and toured the UK a second time with Here Come the Girls alongside Anastacia and Heather Small. In November 2010, she hosted the BBC TV series Rewind the 60s, with each episode focusing on a year during the 1960s, highlighting the social and political issues of the decade, as well as music and interviews with personalities.

On 26 February 2011, she appeared in the second heat in the third series of Let's Dance for Comic Relief. She danced to Soulja Boy's hit "Crank That". In May 2011, she made an appearance on the ITV2 programme, Celebrity Juice and, in July 2011, she performed at the Llangollen International Musical Eisteddfod. In October and November 2011, Lulu took part in the BBC series Strictly Come Dancing. Partnered by Brendan Cole, she was eliminated 5th.

In August 2014, Lulu opened the closing ceremony of the 2014 Glasgow Commonwealth Games. On 11 February 2015, she appeared on The Great Comic Relief Bake Off in aid of Comic Relief, when she revealed that she had never before made a pastry. On 1 April 2017, she appeared as a guest on All Round to Mrs. Brown's alongside Holly Willoughby and Phillip Schofield. On 17 August 2017, she was the subject of the BBC's Who Do You Think You Are programme.

On 19 March 2018, she joined the cast of 42nd Street playing the lead role Dorothy Brock for a 16-week tenure. Between April and June 2019, Lulu toured with Take That and their Greatest Hits tour, performing "Relight My Fire". On 18 December 2019, she performed "Run Rudolph Run" and "Shout" in the Miss World 2019 pageant.

=== 2020s: Television, touring, and new music ===
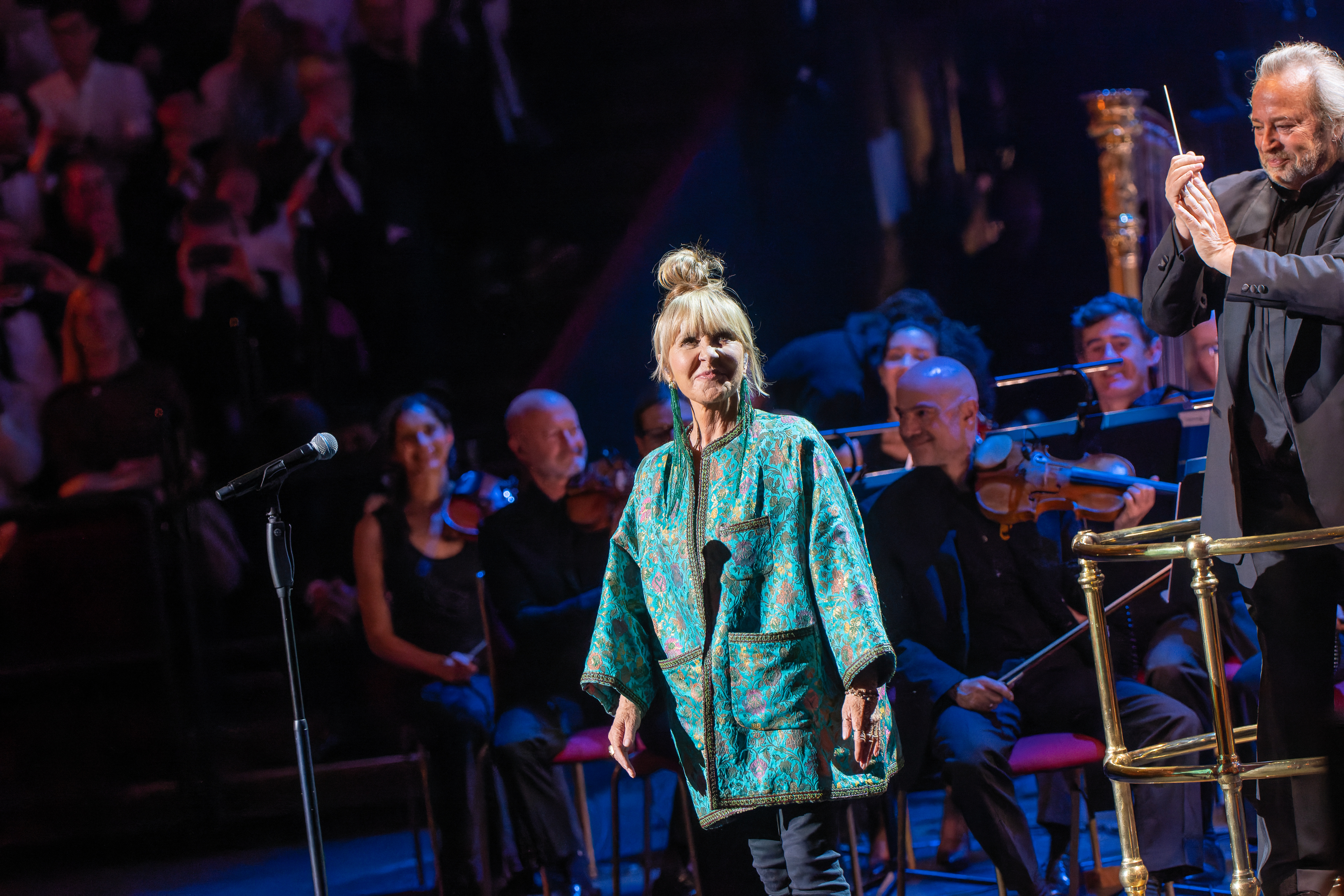
Lulu performing at The Sound of 007, 2022

In October 2021, Lulu was a guest judge on the BBC program RuPaul's Drag Race UK. In March 2022, she voiced a character in My Old School, the film about 30-year-old fraudulent pupil Brandon Lee at Bearsden Academy in Glasgow, and also sang the closing theme, "My Old School".

In January 2023, Lulu appeared on the fourth series of The Masked Singer as "Piece of Cake". She was the second contestant voted out of the competition. Her For The Record UK Tour in 2023 was Lulu's first tour since 2019, an ambitious and extensive return to her live performance schedule.

On 3 November 2023, to celebrate her seventy-fifth birthday, Lulu announced her Champagne for Lulu! UK tour dates for 2024; her only London performance, held on 17 April at the London Palladium, marked the sixth decade anniversary of her first hit single, "Shout".

On 29 June 2025, Lulu was a special guest for Rod Stewart who played the Legends spot at the Glastonbury Festival, with the set being broadcast live by the BBC. The pair sang Stewart's 1978 hit "Hot Legs", the first time they had performed together.

Lulu continued to tour through 2025 and 2026, most notably a sold out engagement at the Royal Albert Hall in June 2026, with concert proceeds going to benefit her Mental Health Trust she established a few years earlier. Shortly after she announced that her first album of new material in over ten years called, Let The Girl Sing Out, would be released in January 2027. The lead single from the album, "I'm In Love Again" was released in the UK on 7 August 2026.

On 25 August 2026 she performed the title track of "The Man with the Golden Gun" at the BBC Proms.

== Personal life ==
Maurice Gibb and Lulu married on 18 February 1969 and separated in 1973, with divorce proceedings initiated in 1974. Their busy careers and his heavy drinking forced them apart and they divorced, childless. The divorce was finalised on 21 August 1975. Gibb later said they both drank: "We didn't have any responsibilities, we'd just party." From 1977 until 1991, Lulu was married to John Frieda and together they had a son, actor Jordan Frieda.

Lulu has said she had an affair with David Bowie in the 1970s. In 1993, when she recorded "Relight My Fire" with Take That, she and Jason Orange had "a very brief dalliance."

In September 2025, to coincide with the publication of her memoir If Only You Knew, Lulu stated in an interview with BBC News that she was an alcoholic, had attended Alcoholics Anonymous, and had been sober for almost 12 years.

== Further information ==
In September 2026, it was announced that a blue plaque commemorating Lulu's big break was to be the first in a projected series of plaques in a new music heritage trail. The Glasgow City Chambers was the setting for the launch of this new initiative. In its coverage of the story, the Herald newspaper shows her with the plaque, which will be installed at the site of the Lindella Club on Union Street where the event took place.

== Discography ==
- Something to Shout About (1965)
- Love Loves to Love Lulu (1967)
- Lulu's Album (1969)
- New Routes (1970)
- Melody Fair (1970)
- Lulu (1973)
- Heaven and Earth and the Stars (1976)
- Don't Take Love for Granted (1979)
- Lulu (1981)
- Take Me to Your Heart Again (1982)
- Independence (1993)
- Together (2002)
- Back on Track (2004)
- A Little Soul in Your Heart (2005)
- Making Life Rhyme (2015)

== Filmography ==
=== Films ===
- Gonks Go Beat (1965)
- To Sir, with Love (1967) (also theme song)
- Cucumber Castle (1970)
- The Cherry Picker (1972)
- Alicja (1982) (voice)
- To Sir, with Love II (1996)
- Whatever Happened to Harold Smith? (1999)
- Absolutely Fabulous: The Movie (2016)
- The Bee Gees: How Can You Mend a Broken Heart (2020)
- My Old School (2022) (voice and closing theme)
- Arthur's Whisky (2024)

=== Television ===
Lulu appeared three times on Show of the Week, twice in 1969 and once in 1972. In early 1978, she was the regular guest on The Les Dawson Show on BBC1. From 1999 to 2000, Lulu hosted 14 episodes of Red Alert with the National Lottery. Lulu has also appeared in a number of TV specials, including one with Bruce Forsyth in 1974 and Lulu's Big Show in 1993 taped at Glasgow's Tramway. Another special in 1999 was dedicated to Lulu's life and career.

Lulu also lent her voice to the cartoon Nellie the Elephant, voicing the titular character and singing the theme song. Lulu appeared in a one-off episode of Heartbeat in November 2002, titled "Harmony", as singer Deborah Vine, mother of a rising star who becomes pregnant. She sings "To Sir, With Love" at a concert, and is joined on stage later by her daughter.

== Awards and recognition ==
In 2017 Lulu was Guest of Honour at the City Lit Awards, celebrating the outstanding work and achievements of various students and staff from across the college, as well as the transformation adult learning can bring. Lulu was appointed Officer of the Order of the British Empire (OBE) in the 2000 Birthday Honours and Commander of the Order of the British Empire (CBE) in the 2021 Birthday Honours for services to music, entertainment and charity.

== See also ==
- List of number-one hits (United States)
- List of artists who reached number one in the United States
- Mononymous person

== Bibliography ==
- Lulu, I Don't Want to Fight, Time Warner Books, 2002
- Lulu, Secrets to Looking Good, HarperCollins, 2010
- Lulu, If Only You Knew, Hodder & Stoughton, 2025

Preceded by Julie Walters	Pauline Mole Actress; 1987	Succeeded by Alison Steadman
Awards and achievements
Preceded by (Spain) Massiel with "La, la, la"	Winner of the Eurovision Song Contest; 1969 (tied with (Spain) Salomé, (France) Frida Boccara, (Netherlands) Lenny Kuhr)	Succeeded by (Republic of Ireland) Dana with "All Kinds of Everything"
Preceded by Cliff Richard with "Congratulations"	UK in the Eurovision Song Contest; 1969	Succeeded by Mary Hopkin with "Knock Knock, Who's There?"
Preceded by Paul McCartney and Wings; Live and Let Die (song), 1973	James Bond title artist The Man with the Golden Gun (song), 1974	Succeeded by Carly Simon; The Spy Who Loved Me ("Nobody Does It Better"), 1977
