= Making Life Rhyme =

Studio album by Lulu
- Released: 13 April 2015
- Genre: Pop rock; soul
- Length: 38:40
- Label: Decca
- Producer: Benson Taylor

Lulu chronology
A Little Soul in Your Heart (2005)	Making Life Rhyme (2015)

Singles from Making Life Rhyme
- 1. "Faith in You" Released: 9 February 2015; 2. "Cry" Released: 14 August 2015

Making Life Rhyme is a studio album by Scottish singer Lulu, released 13 April 2015. Reunited with her debut record label Decca, the album is Lulu's first in a decade and the first of her career in which she co-wrote all of the original songs. In addition, two covers are featured: Jimi Hendrix's "Angel", in the style of Rod Stewart's hit version, and the traditional American folk song "Wayfaring Stranger". A digital only deluxe edition also includes new recordings of three songs from Lulu's career.

The album was preceded by the lead single, "Faith in You". Lulu promoted the release with several television appearances including a live performance on the BBC's The One Show. In May 2015, Lulu embarked on her first solo UK and Ireland tour in over ten years in support of the album. The second single, "Cry", was released to radio on 14 August 2015. A new version, recorded with the Military Wives choirs, was released on 26 February 2016 with all proceeds going to the Military Wives Choir Foundation.

== Critical reception ==
Professional ratings
Review scores
Source	Rating
Allmusic	4/5 stars
The Guardian	3/5 stars
The Telegraph	4/5 stars

Making Life Rhyme has generally received positive reviews from music critics. Neil McCormick of The Telegraph gave the album four stars and wrote "Making Life Rhyme is the best thing Lulu has done since the early Seventies".

The Guardian gave the album a three star rating, adding "There's little in the way of surprises but this is a solidly enjoyable collection".

The online music guide AllMusic praised the album, giving it a four star review, with Stephen Thomas Erlewine commenting: "Arriving ten years after Lulu's impressive 2004 comeback Back on Track, 2015's Making Life Rhyme is every bit that record's equal and perhaps it's better in some ways". He concluded that the record "ranks among her very best".

== Track listing ==
No.	Title	Writer(s)	Length
1.	"Faith in You"	Lulu; Billy Lawrie; Richard Cardwell; Peter Gordeno	3:48
2.	"Every Single Day"	Lulu; Lawrie; Ben Mark	3:19
3.	"The Answer Is Love"	Lulu; Lawrie; Jim Cregan	3:34
4.	"Cry"	Lulu; Lawrie; Martin Sutton	4:08
5.	"Poison Kiss"	Lulu; Lawrie; Cregan	3:28
6.	"Hypnotised"	Lulu; Lawrie; Mark	3:35
7.	"Heaven Help"	Lulu; Lawrie; Cardwell	3:42
8.	"Make Life Rhyme"	Lulu; Lawrie; Cardwell; Benson Taylor	3:20
9.	"Angel"	Jimi Hendrix	3:32
10.	"Messed Up World"	Lulu; Lawrie; Paddy Dalton	4:00
11.	"Wayfaring Stranger"	Traditional	2:09
Total length:			38:40

Deluxe edition bonus tracks
No.	Title	Writer(s)	Length
12.	"Relight My Fire" (2015 version)	Dan Hartman	4:11
13.	"Shout" (2015 version)	O'Kelly Isley, Jr.; Rudolph Isley; Ronald Isley	4:40
14.	"I Don't Wanna Fight" (2015 version)	Lulu; Lawrie; Steve DuBerry	4:42
Total length:			52:15

== Charts ==
Making Life Rhyme peaked at number 35 on the UK Albums Chart during the week starting 25 April 2015, but by the following week had dropped out of the top 100.
