= Something to Shout About (album) =

Studio album by Lulu
- Released: 1965
- Genre: Pop
- Length: 47:58 (Reissue)
- Label: Decca
- Producer: Peter Sullivan

Lulu chronology
Something to Shout About (1965)	Love Loves to Love Lulu (1967)

Something to Shout About is Lulu's first UK LP, released on the Decca Records label in 1965. Most of the songs are recorded in an R&B, early rock and roll style that complemented her mature and raspy voice. It was released when she was just seventeen. The album contained Lulu's debut hit "Shout", which reached #7 in the UK Singles Chart.

Jimmy Page played guitar on some of the tracks, including "I'll Come Running Over" and "Surprise, Surprise". "Here Comes the Night" was recorded in 1964 by Them and would later be covered by David Bowie on his 1973 album Pin Ups. The album was produced by Peter Sullivan and "directed" by Mike Leander and Reg Guest.

The album was reissued on CD in 1989 by London Records.

Professional ratings
Review scores
Source	Rating
Allmusic	link
Record Mirror	4/5 stars

== Track listing ==
=== Side one ===
1. "You Touch Me Baby" (Sammy Fain, Ed Silvers)
2. "You'll Never Leave Her" (Bert Russell, Mike Stoller)
3. "I'll Come Running Over" (Bert Berns, Ilene Stuart)
4. "Not in This Whole World" (Troy Davis, Joe Simmons)
5. "She Will Break Your Heart" (Jerry Butler, Clarence Carter, Curtis Mayfield)
6. "Can I Get a Witness" (Holland-Dozier-Holland)
7. "Tell Me Like It Is" (Bob Brass, Al Kooper, Irwin Levine)
8. "Shout" (O'Kelly Isley, Ronald Isley, Rudolph Isley) - Lulu with The Luvvers

=== Side two ===
1. "Try to Understand" (Lori Burton, Pam Sawyer)
2. "Night Time Is the Right Time" (Leroy Carr, Lew Herman)
3. "Chocolate Ice" (Mike Leander) - Lulu with The Luvvers
4. "So in Love" (Billy Jackson, George Williams, Roy Straigis)
5. "Only One" (Mike Leander) - Lulu with The Luvvers
6. "Dream Lover" (Clifford Grey, Victor Schertzinger)
7. "He's Sure the Boy I Love" (Barry Mann, Cynthia Weil)
8. "Leave a Little Love" (Robin Conrad, Les Reed)

Note: Track 4 "So in Love" Incorrectly attributed to Cole Porter on original LP release. This song is a.k.a. "So Much in Love", originally performed by the Tymes.

==== CD bonus tracks ====
1. "Surprise, Surprise" (Mick Jagger, Keith Richards)
2. "Satisfied" (Carole King)
3. "Call Me" (Tony Hatch)
4. "Here Comes the Night" (Bert Berns, Bert Russell, Pierce Turner)
