= It's Lulu (TV series) =

1970 British BBC TV series

It’s Lulu is a British television program hosted by Lulu that was produced between 1970 and 1973 by Stewart Morris, Colin Charman, John Ammonds and Vernon Lawrence, and broadcast on BBC1. Episodes 1, 2, 5, 6, 9 and 10 of series 3 were repeated on BBC2 in a different running order under the banner Show of the Week: It's Lulu from 25 July to 5 September 1974.

== Episodes ==
No. overall	No. in season	Title	Directed by	Original release date
1	1	"Episode 1"	Stewart Morris	11 July 1970
The first of a series starring Lulu in which she introduces her special guests This week: Ray Stevens, Mike Yarwood, Arrival and the Douglas Squires Dozen.
2	2	"Episode 2"	Stewart Morris	18 July 1970
Lulu introduces her special guests Mama Cass, Basil Brush with Derek Fowlds and Brotherhood of Man. Featuring Alyn Ainsworth & His Orchestra and the Douglas Squires Dozen.
3	3	"Episode 3"	Stewart Morris	25 July 1970
Lulu introduces her special guests Dudley Moore and his Trio, Mama Cass, Les Dawson and Marmalade. 'Cuddly' Dudley Moore is not only a comic but also one of Britain's best jazz pianists; as he demonstrates tonight. Comedy comes from Les Dawson, and the pop interest is represented by Mama Cass (one-time member of the Mamas and the Papas) and Marmalade. Featuring Alyn Ainsworth & His Orchestra and the Douglas Squires Dozen.
4	4	"Episode 4"	Stewart Morris	1 August 1970
Lulu introduces her guests Peter Cook, Jerry Reed and the Hollies with her special guest Matt Monro. Featuring Alyn Ainsworth & His Orchestra and the Douglas Squires Dozen.
5	5	"Episode 5"	Stewart Morris	8 August 1970
Lulu introduces her guests Lonnie Donegan, Aretha Franklin, Mike Newman and Pickettywitch. Featuring Alyn Ainsworth & His Orchestra and the Douglas Squires Dozen.
6	6	"Episode 6"	Stewart Morris	15 August 1970
Lulu introduces her guests Roy Castle, Arthur Worsley, Fairweather and from the USA Martha Reeves & the Vandellas. Featuring Alyn Ainsworth & His Orchestra and the Douglas Squires Dozen.
7	7	"Episode 7"	Stewart Morris	22 August 1970
Lulu introduces her guests Bruce Forsyth, Clodagh Rodgers and the Peddlers. Featuring Alyn Ainsworth & His Orchestra and the Douglas Squires Dozen.
8	8	"Episode 8"	Stewart Morris	29 August 1970
Lulu introduces her guests Roy Hudd, Esther Ofarim and the Moody Blues. Featuring Alyn Ainsworth & His Orchestra and the Douglas Squires Dozen.
9	9	"Episode 9"	Stewart Morris	5 September 1970
Lulu introduces her guests Norman Vaughan, Mac Davis and Johnny Johnson and the Bandwagon. Featuring Alyn Ainsworth & His Orchestra and the Douglas Squires Dozen.

No. overall	No. in season	Title	Directed by	Original release date
10	1	"Episode 1"	Stewart Morris	17 July 1971 at 8:00pm
The first of a new series starring Lulu in which she introduces her special guests. This week Hines, Hines and Dad, John Junkin and with Alyn Ainsworth & His Orchestra and the Fellas choreographed by Dougie Squires.
11	2	"Episode 2"	Stewart Morris	24 July 1971 at 8:35pm
Lulu introduces her special guests Alan Price & Georgie Fame and William Franklyn. Featuring Alyn Ainsworth & His Orchestra and the Fellas choreographed by Dougie Squires.
12	3	"Episode 3"	Stewart Morris	31 July 1971 at 8:15pm
Lulu introduces her special guests Terry Scott, Ashton, Gardner and Dyke and Buffy Sainte-Marie. Featuring Alyn Ainsworth & His Orchestra and the Fellas choreographed by Dougie Squires.
13	4	"Episode 4"	Stewart Morris	7 August 1971 8:30pm
Lulu introduces her special guests Buddy Greco, the Dudley Moore Trio and Gilbert O'Sullivan. Featuring Alyn Ainsworth & His Orchestra and the Fellas choreographed by Dougie Squires.
14	5	"Episode 5"	Stewart Morris	14 August 1971 at 8:15pm
Lulu introduces her special guests Shari Lewis, Jimmy Logan and the New Seekers. Featuring Alyn Ainsworth & His Orchestra and the Fellas choreographed by Dougie Squires.
15	6	"Episode 6"	Stewart Morris	21 August 1971 at 8:15pm
Lulu introduces her special guests Ted Rogers, Jimmy Ruffin and Esther Ofarim. Featuring Alyn Ainsworth & His Orchestra and the Fellas choreographed by Dougie Squires.
16	7	"Episode 7"	Stewart Morris	28 August 1971 at 8:25pm
Lulu introduces her special guests Vince Hill and the Bee Gees. Featuring Alyn Ainsworth & His Orchestra and the Fellas choreographed by Dougie Squires.
17	8	"Episode 8"	Stewart Morris	4 September 1971 at 8:25pm
Lulu introduces her special guests Engelbert Humperdinck and the Hollies. Featuring Alyn Ainsworth & His Orchestra and the Fellas choreographed by Dougie Squires.

No. overall	No. in season	Title	Directed by	Original release date
18	1	"Episode 1"	Stewart Morris	15 July 1972 at 8:30pm
It's Lulu, Not To Mention Dudley Moore with their guests Slade, the Dudley Moore Trio and Segment with Alyn Ainsworth & His Orchestra.
19	2	"Episode 2"	Stewart Morris	22 July 1972 at 8:35pm
It's Lulu, Not To Mention Dudley Moore with their guest Gilbert O'Sullivan and featuring the Dudley Moore Trio and Segment with Alyn Ainsworth & His Orchestra.
20	3	"Episode 3"	Stewart Morris	29 July 1972 at 8:30pm
It's Lulu, Not To Mention Dudley Moore with their guest Dusty Springfield and featuring the Dudley Moore Trio and Segment with Alyn Ainsworth & His Orchestra.
21	4	"Episode 4"	Stewart Morris	5 August 1972 8:35pm
It's Lulu, Not To Mention Dudley Moore with their guest Roberta Flack and featuring the Dudley Moore Trio and Segment with Alyn Ainsworth & His Orchestra.
22	5	"Episode 5"	Stewart Morris	12 August 1972 at 8:35pm
It's Lulu, Not To Mention Dudley Moore with their guest Johnny Nash and featuring the Dudley Moore Trio and Segment with Alyn Ainsworth & His Orchestra.
23	6	"Episode 6"	Stewart Morris	19 August 1972 at 8:30pm
It's Lulu, Not To Mention Dudley Moore with their guests Cliff Richard and Graham Bonnet and featuring the Dudley Moore Trio and Segment with Alyn Ainsworth & His Orchestra.
24	7	"Episode 7"	Stewart Morris	26 August 1972 at 8:15pm
It's Lulu, Not To Mention Dudley Moore with their guests the Young Generation and Colin Pilditch and featuring the Dudley Moore Trio and Segment with Alyn Ainsworth & His Orchestra.

No. overall	No. in season	Title	Directed by	Original release date
25	1	"Episode 1"	Vernon Lawrence	15 September 1973 at 6:30pm
It's Lulu with Adrienne Posta, Roger Kitter and Paul Greenwood and her special guest Warren Mitchell as Alf Garnett. Featuring Segment and Alyn Ainsworth & His Orchestra.
26	2	"Episode 2"	Vernon Lawrence	22 September 1973 at 7:15pm
It's Lulu with Adrienne Posta, Roger Kitter and Paul Greenwood and her special guests Ronnie Corbett and the Kinks. Featuring Segment and Alyn Ainsworth & His Orchestra.
27	3	"Episode 3"	Vernon Lawrence	29 September 1973 at 7:15pm
It's Lulu with Adrienne Posta, Roger Kitter and Paul Greenwood and her special guests Les Dawson and Sérgio Mendes & Brazil ‘77. Featuring Segment and Alyn Ainsworth & His Orchestra.
28	4	"Episode 4"	Vernon Lawrence	6 October 1973 7:30pm
It's Lulu with Adrienne Posta, Roger Kitter and Paul Greenwood and her special guests Marty Feldman and Joel Grey star of the film 'Cabaret'. Featuring Segment and Alyn Ainsworth & His Orchestra.
29	5	"Episode 5"	Vernon Lawrence	13 October 1973 at 6:35pm
It's Lulu with Adrienne Posta, Roger Kitter and Paul Greenwood and her special guests Tony Orlando and Dawn and Rod Hull & Emu. Featuring Segment and Alyn Ainsworth & His Orchestra.
30	6	"Episode 6"	Vernon Lawrence	20 October 1973 at 7:15pm
It's Lulu with Adrienne Posta, Roger Kitter and Paul Greenwood and her special guests Jimmy Edwards and Don McLean. Featuring Segment and Alyn Ainsworth & His Orchestra.
31	7	"Episode 7"	Vernon Lawrence	27 October 1973 at 7:20pm
It's Lulu with Adrienne Posta, Roger Kitter and Paul Greenwood and her special guests Dick Emery and David Clayton-Thomas. Featuring Segment and Alyn Ainsworth & His Orchestra.
32	8	"Episode 8"	Vernon Lawrence	3 November 1973 at 7:15pm
It's Lulu with Adrienne Posta, Roger Kitter and Paul Greenwood and her special guests Engelbert Humperdink and the New Seekers. Featuring Segment and Alyn Ainsworth & His Orchestra.
33	9	"Episode 9"	Vernon Lawrence	17 November 1973 at 7:25pm
It's Lulu with Adrienne Posta, Roger Kitter and Paul Greenwood and her special guests Gilbert O'Sullivan and Little Angels Children's Folk Ballet of Korea. Featuring Segment and Alyn Ainsworth & His Orchestra.
34	10	"Episode 10"	Vernon Lawrence	24 November 1973 at 7:15pm
It's Lulu with Adrienne Posta, Roger Kitter and Paul Greenwood and her special guests Ronnie Barker, Bill Withers and Jose Luis Moreno. Featuring Segment and Alyn Ainsworth & His Orchestra.
