= Melody Fair (album) =

Studio album by Lulu
- Released: June 26, 1970
- Recorded: March – May 1970
- Studio: Atlantic South-Criteria Studios, Miami, Florida
- Genre: Pop
- Label: Atco (2400017)
- Producer: Jerry Wexler, Tom Dowd, Arif Mardin

Lulu chronology
New Routes (1970)	Melody Fair (1970)	The Most of Lulu (1971)

Professional ratings
Review scores
Source	Rating
Allmusic	3/5 stars

Melody Fair is an album recorded by Lulu in 1970 for a release on Atco Records. She had recorded her first album for Atco, New Routes, in the fall of 1969 under the production auspices of top Atlantic Records execs Jerry Wexler, Tom Dowd and Arif Mardin. Although New Routes had been a commercial disappointment, Wexler, Dowd and Mardin had Lulu record tracks for a follow-up album in March 1970 with virtually the same session personnel who had played on New Routes, although the latter album had been recorded at Muscle Shoals Sound Studio and the 1970 sessions were recorded at Criteria Studios in Miami.

The album's advance single "Hum a Song (From Your Heart)", co-credited to the Dixie Flyers and backed by the New Routes track "Where's Eddie", was issued in April 1970 to stall at #54 on the Billboard Hot 100. The track also fell short of the UK Top 50 despite a Top of the Pops performance broadcast on 18 June 1970.

Lulu completed recording for her upcoming album in May 1970 and after a further single release: the overlooked "After the Feeling is Gone", that June the Melody Fair album was issued in June 1970 with no significant commercial impact. A further single release, comprising the tracks "Melody Fair" and "To the Other Woman (I'm the Other Woman)", had an overlooked release that September.

Lulu began a third album at Criteria Studios in November 1970, but the project was not completed. Although she would remain contracted to Atco until 1972, she would have no further albums on the label, with only occasional overlooked singles. The material from New Routes and Melody Fair, augmented by her singles-only releases and unissued material, was released in 2007 as Lulu: the Atco Sessions, 1969 - 1972.

== Track listing ==
=== Side one ===
1. "Good Day Sunshine" (John Lennon, Paul McCartney)
2. "After the Feeling is Gone" (Terry Woodford, George Soulé)
3. "I Don't Care Anymore" (Jerry Williams, Jr., Gary U.S. Bonds, Maurice Gimbel)
4. "(Don't Go) Please Stay" (Burt Bacharach, Bob Hilliard)
5. "Melody Fair" (Barry Gibb, Maurice Gibb, Robin Gibb)
6. "Take Good Care of Yourself" (Jim Doris)

=== Side two ===
1. "Vine Street" (Randy Newman)
2. "Move to My Rhythm" (Fran Robins)
3. "To the Other Woman (I'm the Other Woman)" (Jerry Williams, Jr., Gary U.S. Bonds)
4. "Hum a Song (From Your Heart)" (Richard Ross)
5. "Sweet Memories" (Mickey Newbury)
6. "Saved" (Jerry Leiber, Mike Stoller)

== Personnel ==
- Lulu - vocals
- The Dixie Flyers

Jim Dickinson - piano, guitar
Charlie Freeman - guitar
Michael Utley - organ
Tommy McClure - bass guitar
Sammy Creason - drums

- The Memphis Horns

Jack Hale, Sr. - trombone
Andrew Love, Ed Logan - tenor saxophone
Floyd Newman - baritone saxophone

- Additional personnel

Felix Cavaliere - Latin percussion
The Sweet Inspirations, Eddie Brigati, David Brigati, Nancy Kirkpatrick, Chuck Kirkpatrick - backing vocals

- Technical staff

Chuck Kirkpatrick, Ron Albert - engineers
Ira Friedlander - album design
Grant Gravitt - photography
