= The Man with the Golden Gun (soundtrack) =

Soundtrack album by John Barry
- Released: 1974
- Recorded: 1974
- Length: 42:17
- Label: EMI
- Producer: Frank Collura (Reissue)

John Barry chronology
The Dove (1974)	The Man with the Golden Gun (1974)	King Kong (1976)

Singles from The Man with the Golden Gun
- 1. "The Man with the Golden Gun" Released: 1974

Professional ratings
Review scores
Source	Rating
AllMusic	3/5 stars

The Man with the Golden Gun is the soundtrack for the ninth James Bond film of the same name.

The theme tune was performed by Lulu, composed by John Barry – returning to the series after a one film absence (George Martin had scored the preceding film Live and Let Die), and the lyrics to the song were written by Don Black.

Barry considered the theme tune – the only Bond film title track not to chart as a single on either the UK Singles Chart or U.S. Billboard Hot 100 – and score to be among the weakest of his contributions to the series: "It's the one I hate most... it just never happened for me." Certainly the title song is notable for having suggestive lyrics, and during a TV celebration for the series' 40th anniversary, Lulu's performance was introduced with reference to its being the raunchiest of all Bond songs. For the first time, the song's end theme is not a straight reprise of the opener, as it begins with different lyrics (subsequent films followed suit with variations in arrangement, ahead of a new practice of using a different song altogether). Some Bond music fans consider Lulu's brassy vocal to be effective in setting the tone for the film's female characters.

The Man with the Golden Gun
A 15-second sample of "The Man with the Golden Gun", the title track. The song was poorly received, with Rolling Stone criticizing its lyrics and ranking it as the worst Bond theme song.

Barry's score for the film has stylistic similarities to that of Diamonds Are Forever – which had marked a gradual transition away from the heavy horn based sound of his 1960s Bond scores to a smoother, string based sound. The film was also the first to drop the distinctive plucked guitar from the "James Bond Theme" heard over the gun barrel sequence – in all subsequent John Barry James Bond scores, this theme would be heard on strings and trumpet. Not present on the album but heard in the film is a brief reprise, for recognition purposes, of the song "Live and Let Die" when a character (Clifton James as Sheriff J.W. Pepper) from the previous film reappears. The next three Bond films would wittily feature excerpts from the familiar music of other films, too (though classics rather than Bond films), while On Her Majesty's Secret Service had included a janitor character (Norman McGlen) whistling the theme from Goldfinger as an in-joke.

Alice Cooper claims his song "Man with the Golden Gun" was a day too late to be used by the film's producers, who had already signed Lulu's song instead. Cooper's song appears on his 1973 album Muscle of Love.

The popular song "Mindfields" by The Prodigy (released on the 1997 album The Fat of the Land) features a specific part of "Hip's Trip". Barry gave the band permission to do so.

In November 2024, La La Land Records released a limited expanded edition containing previously unreleased music.

== Track listing ==
=== 1974 release ===
Composer, except as noted, is John Barry.

1. "The Man with the Golden Gun (Main Title)" (J. Barry/Don Black) – Lulu
2. "Scaramanga's Fun House"
3. "Chew Me in Grisly Land" (Note: contains the "James Bond Theme", originally composed for the Dr. No soundtrack)
4. "The Man with the Golden Gun (Jazz Instrumental)"
5. "Getting the Bullet"
6. "Goodnight Goodnight"
7. "Let's Go Get 'Em"
8. "Hip's Trip"
9. "Kung Fu Fight"
10. "In Search of Scaramanga's Island"
11. "Return to Scaramanga's Fun House"
12. "The Man With the Golden Gun (End Title)" (Barry/Black) – Lulu

=== 2024 release ===
==== Disc 1 ====
1. "Gun Barrel / The Island" (1:36)
2. "Scaramanga’s Fun House" (4:37)
3. "Main Title: The Man with the Golden Gun" (Performed by Lulu) (2:35)
4. "Getting the Bullet" (2:43)
5. "Macau / Forever Hold Your Piece" (2:04)
6. "Following Andrea" (1:43)
7. "Scaramanga Strikes" (2:05)
8. "Hip’s Trip" (3:19)
9. "Chew Me" (2:03)
10. "Quite Titillating" (1:02)
11. "Grisly Land" (2:12)
12. "Take Mr. Bond to School / Chula / Escape" (1:30)
13. "Kung Fu Fight" (1:54)
14. "20,000 Baht" (1:22)
15. "J.W. Pepper / Bond Rides Off" (0:39)
16. "The Death of Hai Fat / New Chairman" (1:22)
17. "Moments" (1:01)
18. "Goodnight Goodnight" (5:22)
19. "You Must Be Good / In the Boot / Car Keys" (2:07)
20. "Let’s Go Get ’Em" (3:48)
21. "Flying Car" (0:58)
22. "In Search of Scaramanga’s Island (Film Version)" (2:33)
23. "Bond’s Arrival / The Solex Agitator / The Sun / Solar Power" (1:32)
24. "Return to Scaramanga’s Fun House" (6:26)
25. "Absolute Zero" (0:59)
26. "Retrieving the Solex Agitator" (2:45)
27. "Slow Boat from China" (1:38)
28. "End Title: The Man with the Golden Gun–Reprise" (Performed by Lulu) (3:06)
29. "Lost Charm" (0:48)
30. "Bottoms Up I" (2:14)
31. "Bottoms Up II" (2:48)
32. "In Search of Scaramanga’s Island (Alternate)" (2:31)
33. "The Man with the Golden Gun (Demo Instrumental)" (2:35)

==== Disc 2 ====
1. "Main Title: The Man with the Golden Gun" (Performed by Lulu) (2:35)
2. "Scaramanga’s Fun House" (4:37)
3. "Chew Me in Grisly Land" (3:59)
4. "The Man with the Golden Gun (Jazz Instrumental)" (2:29)
5. "Getting the Bullet" (2:43)
6. "Goodnight Goodnight" (5:21)
7. "Let’s Go Get ’Em" (3:41)
8. "Hip’s Trip" (3:19)
9. "Kung Fu Fight" (1:54)
10. "In Search of Scaramanga’s Island" (2:28)
11. "Return To Scaramanga’s Fun House" (6:26)
12. "End Title: The Man with the Golden Gun–Reprise" (Performed by Lulu) (3:06)

== See also ==
- Outline of James Bond
