= Lulu's Album =

Studio album by Lulu
- Released: October 1969
- Genre: Pop
- Label: Columbia
- Producer: Mickie Most

Lulu chronology
Love Loves to Love Lulu (1967)	Lulu's Album (1969)	New Routes (1970)

Professional ratings
Review scores
Source	Rating
Allmusic	(UK) (US)

Lulu's Album (US title It's Lulu) is an album by British pop singer Lulu, released in 1969. Despite promotion from her TV show, Lulu and recently winning the Eurovision Song Contest, this album failed to chart. Her biggest British solo hit, Eurovision winner "Boom Bang-a-Bang", was not included on the album despite recently hitting No.2 in the UK singles chart. The song that placed 3rd in the A Song for Europe heats, "Come September" was featured on the track list. It was her last album with producer Mickie Most, who had guided her career successfully through the late 1960s. Lulu's Album contained an array of cover versions from recent pop and rock hits, which was common practice for many female artists at this point. Following this, Lulu was to change musical style for the next few years to a more credible and mature approach.

Lulu's Album was issued in the US (Epic) the following year as It's Lulu and again in 1972 as The Most of Lulu Volume 2. It has since been released on compact disc.

== Track listing ==
=== Side one ===
1. "Show Me" (Joe Tex)
2. "Mighty Quinn" (Bob Dylan)
3. "My Ain Folk" (Laura Lemon, Wilfrid Mills)
4. "Where Did You Come From" (Don Black, Mark London)
5. "Gimme Some Lovin'" (Spencer Davis, Steve Winwood, Muff Winwood)

=== Side two ===
1. "I Started a Joke" (Barry Gibb, Robin Gibb, Maurice Gibb)
2. "Why Did I Choose You" (Michael Leonard, Herbert Martin)
3. "The Boy Next Door" (Ralph Blane, Hugh Martin)
4. "Come September" (Don Black, Mark London)
5. "A House Is Not a Home" (Burt Bacharach, Hal David)
6. "Cry Like a Baby" (Spooner Oldham, Dan Penn)

== Personnel ==
- Vocals: Lulu
- Producer: Mickie Most
- Engineer: Dave L. Siddle
- Arrangers: John Paul Jones, Johnny Harris
