= Incognito discography =

- Studio albums: 20
- Extended plays: 1
- Live albums: 2
- Compilation albums: 5
- Singles: 46
- Remix albums: 5

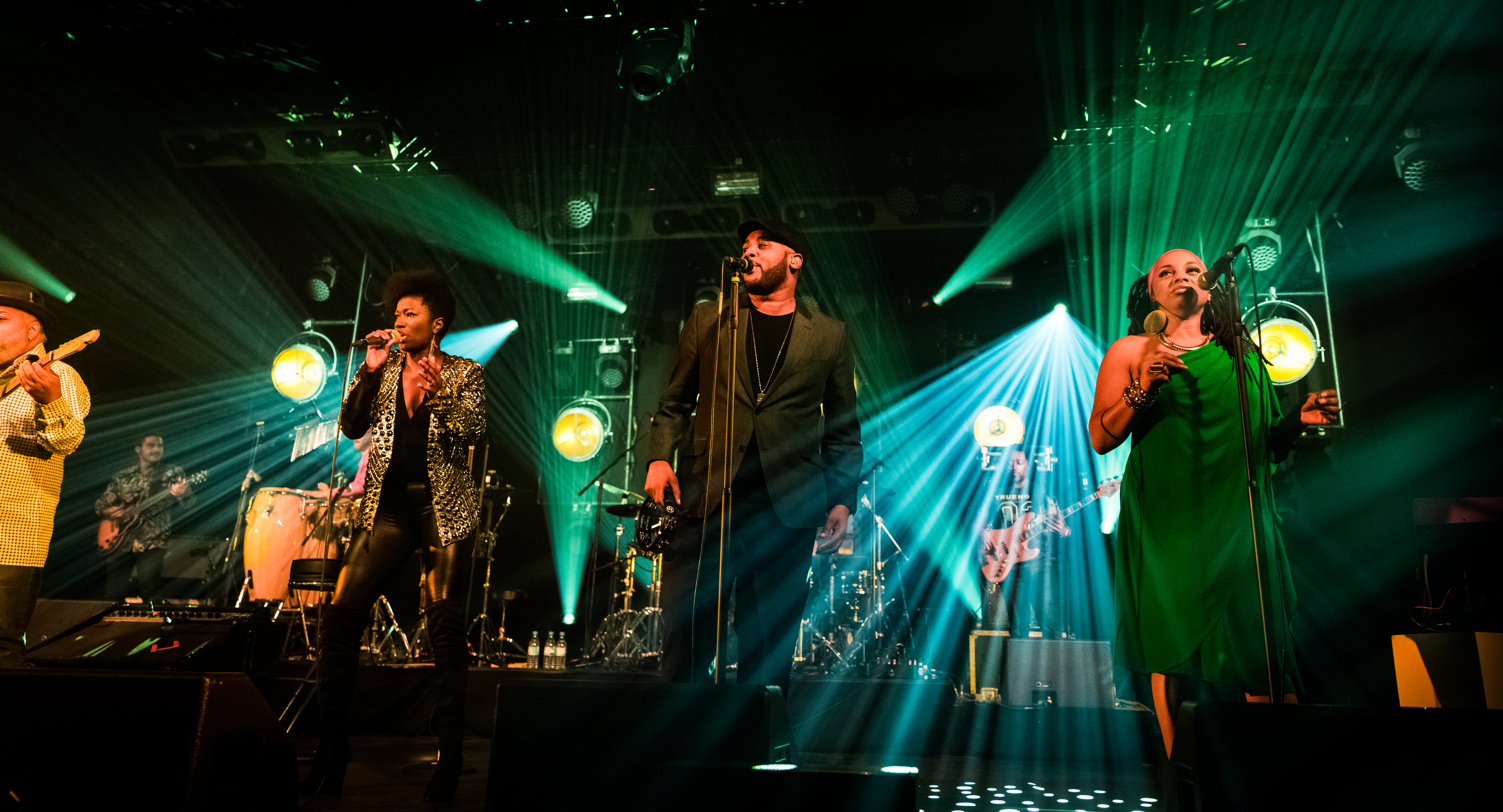
Incognito band performing during 2016

The discography of Incognito, a British music band.

== Albums ==
=== Studio albums ===
Year	Album details	Peak chart positions									
Year	Album details	AUS	AUT	GER	NLD	SWI	UK	US Indie	US Jazz	US R&B	US 200
1981	Jazz Funk: Released: April 18, 1981; Label: Ensign Encore/Chrysalis/EMI (0946 3 21953 2 6); Formats: LP, CD	—	—	—	—	—	28	—	—	—	—
1991	Inside Life: Released: 1991; Label: Talkin' Loud/Mercury/PolyGram (848 546); Formats: LP, CD	—	—	—	42	—	44	—	—	—	—
1992	Tribes, Vibes + Scribes: Released: 1992; Label: Talkin' Loud/Verve/PolyGram (512 363); Formats: LP, CD	194	37	98	49	20	41	—	5	74	—
1993	Positivity: Released: November 15, 1993; Label: Talkin' Loud/Verve/PolyGram (518 260); Formats: LP, CD	108	—	—	—	37	55	—	3	54	—
1995	100° and Rising: Released: 1995; Label: Talkin' Loud/Verve/PolyGram (528 000); Formats: LP, CD	79	35	64	72	9	11	—	2	29	149
1996	Beneath the Surface: Released: 1996; Label: Talkin' Loud/Verve/PolyGram (534 071); Formats: LP, CD	—	—	—	—	41	—	—	2	—	—
1999	No Time Like The Future: Released: 1999; Label: Talkin' Loud/Blue Thumb/Universal (538 947); Formats: LP, CD	84	—	—	—	47	—	—	4	—	—
2001	Life, Stranger than Fiction: Released: 2001; Label: Talkin' Loud/Blue Thumb/Universal (586 085); Formats: CD	—	—	—	—	76	—	—	—	—	—
2002	Who Needs Love: Released: 2002; Label: Dôme (#DOME39); Formats: LP, CD	—	—	—	—	—	—	—	7	74	—
2004	Adventures in Black Sunshine: Released: 2004; Label: Rice/Narada/Virgin/EMI (7243 5 70863 2 5); Formats: LP, CD	—	—	97	—	—	—	—	8	47	—
2005	Eleven: Released: 2005; Label: Rice/Narada/Virgin/EMI (0946 3 31897 2 0); Formats: LP, CD	—	—	—	—	—	—	—	2	52	—
2006	Bees + Things + Flowers: Released: 2006; Label: Dôme (#DOME74); Formats: LP, CD	—	—	—	—	—	—	—	8	—	—
2008	Tales from the Beach: Released: 2008; Label: Dôme (#DOME93; Formats: CD	—	—	—	—	—	—	38	5	26	—
2010	Transatlantic R.P.M.: Released: 2010; Label: Dôme (#DOME306; Formats: LP, CD	—	—	—	—	—	—	—	7	50	—
2012	Surreal: Released: 2012; Label: Shanachie; Formats: CD	—	—	—	—	—	—	—	6	57	—
2014	Amplified Soul: Released: 2014; Label: Shanachie; Formats: CD	—	—	—	—	—	96	—	2	31	—
2016	In Search of Better Days: Released: 2016; Label: earMusic; Formats: CD	—	—	—	—	60	—	—	—	—	—
2019	Tomorrow's New Dream: Released: 8 November 2019; Label: Bluey Music; Formats: CD, download, streaming	—	—	—	—	—	—	—	—	—	—
2023	Into You: Released: 20 October 2023; Label: Splash Blue; Formats: LP, CD, download, streaming	—	—	—	—	—	—	—	—	—	—
2025	Music. Magic. Ironic.: Released: 25 December 2025; Label: Splash Blue; Formats: LP, CD, download, streaming	—	—	—	—	—	—	—	—	—	—
"—" denotes an album that did not chart or was not released in that region.

=== Compilation albums ===
Year	Album details	Peak chart positions								
Year	Album details	AUS	GER	NLD	SWI	UK	US Indie	US Jazz	US R&B	US 200
1997	Blue Moods: Released: 1997; Label: Talkin' Loud (#543783); Formats: CD	176	—	—	—	—	—	—	—	—
1998	The Best of Incognito (Japanese release): Released: 1998; Label: Formats:	—	—	—	—	—	—	—	—	—
2000	The Best of Incognito: Released: 2000; Label: Talkin' Loud (#548283); Formats: CD	—	—	—	—	—	—	13	—	—
2005	Let the Music Play: Released: 2005; Label: Universal Music Classics & Jazz (#9828791); Formats: 2CD	—	—	—	—	—	—	—	—	—
2006	The Millennium Collection: The Best of: Released: 2006; Label: Hip-O (#B006125); Formats: CD	—	—	—	—	—	—	—	—	—
"—" denotes an album that did not chart or was not released in that region.

=== Remix albums ===
Year	Album details	Peak chart positions								
Year	Album details	AUT	GER	NLD	SWI	UK	US Indie	US Jazz	US R&B	US 200
1996	Remixed: Released: 1996; Label: Talkin' Loud/Mercury/PolyGram (532 039); Formats: LP, CD	—	—	—	—	56	—	—	—	—
2000	Future Remixed: Released: 2000; Label: Talkin' Loud/Verve/PolyGram (546990); Formats: LP, CD	—	—	—	—	—	—	—	—	—
2001	EP - Life, Stranger Than Fiction: Remixes: Released: 2001; Label: Talkin' Loud/Blue Thumb/Universal (588 847); Formats: LP	—	—	—	—	—	—	—	—	—
2003	Love X Love: Who Needs Love Remixes: Released: 2003; Label: Pony Canyon (#PCCY01656); Formats: CD	—	—	—	—	—	—	—	—	—
2005	Feed Your Soul: Remixed with Rice Artists: Released: 2005; Label: Edel/Pony Canyon (#LSP01702); Formats: 2CD	—	—	—	—	—	—	—	—	—
2008	More Tales: Remixed with Rice Artists: Released: 2008; Label: Dôme (#DOME96); Formats: CD	—	—	—	—	—	—	—	—	—
"—" denotes an album that did not chart or was not released in that region.

=== Live albums ===
Year	Album details
1997	Last Night in Tokyo: Released: 1997; Label: Talkin' Loud 1555; Formats: CD
2010	Live in London: The 30th Anniversary Concert: Released: 2010; Label: In-Akustik; Formats: CD
2015	Live in London: The 35th Anniversary Show: Released 2015; Label: earMusic; Formats: CD, digital

== Singles ==
Year	Song title	Peak chart positions									Album
Year	Song title	AUS	GER	IRL	NLD	SWI	UK	US DCS	US DSS	US R&B	Album
1980	"Parisienne Girl"	—	—	—	—	—	73	—	—	—	Jazz Funk a.k.a. Jazzfunk (1981)
1981	"Incognito"	—	—	—	—	—	—	—	—	—	Jazz Funk a.k.a. Jazzfunk (1981)
1981	"North London Boy"/"Second Chance"	—	—	—	—	—	—	—	—	—	only single
1989	"Today's People"	—	—	—	—	—	—	—	—	—	only single
1990	"Can You Feel Me"	—	—	—	—	—	96	—	—	—	Inside Life (1991)
1991	"Always There" featuring Jocelyn Brown	—	20	25	2	8	6	31	17	—	Inside Life (1991)
1991	"Inside Life"	—	—	—	—	—	—	—	—	—	Inside Life (1991)
1991	"Crazy for You" featuring Chyna Gordon	—	77	—	58	—	59	—	—	—	Inside Life (1991)
1992	"Don't You Worry 'bout a Thing"	196	46	—	6	—	19	—	—	—	Tribes, Vibes and Scribes a.k.a. Tribes Vibes + Scribes (1992)
1992	"Change"	—	—	—	—	—	52	—	—	—	Tribes, Vibes and Scribes a.k.a. Tribes Vibes + Scribes (1992)
1993	"Still a Friend of Mine"	153	—	—	—	—	47	—	—	—	Positivity (1993)
1993	"Givin' It Up"	—	—	—	—	—	43	35	—	—	Positivity (1993)
1994	"Pieces of a Dream"	—	—	—	—	—	35	—	—	—	Positivity (1993)
1995	"Everyday"	—	—	—	—	—	23	—	—	—	100° and Rising (1995)
1995	"I Hear Your Name"	141	—	—	—	—	42	—	—	—	100° and Rising (1995)
1995	"Jacob's Ladder"	—	—	—	—	—	—	—	—	—	100° and Rising (1995)
1995	"Good Love"	—	—	—	—	—	—	—	—	—	100° and Rising (1995)
1995	"Spellbound and Speechless"	—	—	—	—	—	—	—	—	105	100° and Rising (1995)
1996	"Where Did We Go Wrong?"	—	—	—	—	—	—	—	—	106	100° and Rising (1995)
1996	"Jump to My Love"/"Always There"	—	—	—	—	—	29	—	—	—	Remixed (1996)
1996	"Out of the Storm"	—	—	—	—	—	57	—	—	—	Beneath the Surface (1996)
1999	"Black Rain"	—	—	—	—	—	—	—	—	—	No Time like the Future (1999)
1999	"I Can See the Future"	—	—	—	—	—	—	—	—	—	No Time like the Future (1999)
1999	"It Ain't Easy"	—	—	—	—	—	—	—	—	—	No Time like the Future (1999)
1999	"Wild & Peaceful"	—	—	—	—	—	—	—	—	—	Future Remixed (2000)
1999	"Nights over Egypt"	—	—	—	—	—	56	38	—	—	No Time like the Future (1999)
2000	"Get into My Groove"	—	—	—	—	—	—	—	—	—	No Time like the Future (1999)
2002	"Can't Get You Out of My Head"	—	—	—	—	—	—	—	—	—	Who Needs Love (2002)
2002	"Morning Sun"	—	—	—	—	—	—	—	—	—	Who Needs Love (2002)
2002	"Reach Out" (remixes)	—	—	—	—	—	—	—	—	—	Life, Stranger Than Fiction (2001)
2003	"On the Road"	—	—	—	—	—	—	—	—	—	Love X Love: Who Needs Love Remixes (2003)
2004	"Listen to the Music"	—	—	—	—	—	—	—	—	—	Adventures in Black Sunshine (2004)
2004	"Don't Turn My Love Away"	—	—	—	—	—	—	—	—	—	Adventures in Black Sunshine (2004)
2004	"Everything Your Heart Desires"	—	—	—	—	—	—	—	—	—	Adventures in Black Sunshine (2004)
2005	"The 25th Chapter"	—	—	—	—	—	—	—	—	—	Adventures in Black Sunshine (2004)
2005	"We Got Music"	—	—	—	—	—	—	—	—	—	Eleven (2005)
2005	"Show Me Love"	—	—	—	—	—	—	—	—	—	Eleven (2005)
2005	"Always There" (re-issue)	—	—	—	—	—	—	—	—	—	Let the Music Play (compilation, 2005)
2005	"Don't You Worry 'bout a Thing" (re-issue)	—	—	—	—	—	—	—	—	—	Let the Music Play (compilation, 2005)
2006	"Listen to the Music" (remix)	—	—	—	—	—	—	—	—	—	Feed Your Soul: Remixed (2005)
2007	"This Thing Called Love" (remix)	—	—	—	—	—	—	—	—	—	Adventures in Black Sunshine (2004)
2007	"That's the Way of the World"	—	—	—	—	—	—	—	—	—	only single
2008	"I've Been Waiting"	—	—	—	—	—	—	—	—	—	Tales from the Beach (2008)
2009	"Happy People"	—	—	—	—	—	—	24	—	—	Tales from the Beach (2008)
2010	"Lowdown"	—	—	—	—	—	—	—	—	—	Transatlantic R.P.M. (2010)
2010	"1975"	—	—	—	—	—	—	—	—	—	Transatlantic R.P.M. (2010)
2023	"Keep Me in The Dark"	—	—	—	—	—	—	—	—	—	Into You (2023)
"—" denotes a single that did not chart or was not released in that region.
