= Transatlantic R.P.M. =

- Album Cover (Europe & Japan)

Studio album by Incognito
- Released: July 27, 2010
- Studios: Cream Studios, Higher Ground Studios, Musikbox and The Pool (London, UK); Miloco The Square (Hoxton, North London, UK); Paramount Recording Studios (Hollywood, California, USA); Ameraycan Studios (North Hollywood, California, USA); Flyte Tyme Studios (Santa Monica, California, USA); Kingsize Soundlabs (Los Angeles, California, USA)
- Genre: Jazz fusion
- Length: 1:12:53
- Label: Dome
- Producers: Jean-Paul Maunick; Francis Hylton

Incognito chronology
Tales from the Beach (2008)	Transatlantic R.P.M. (2010)	Sureal (2014)

Alternative Album Cover
- Album Cover (US)

Transatlantic R.P.M. is an album by the British acid jazz band Incognito, released in 2010 on Dome Records. The album peaked at No. 4 on the UK Jazz & Blues Albums chart, No. 16 on the UK Independent Albums chart and No. 8 on the US Billboard Top Contemporary Jazz Albums chart.

== Critical reception ==
Professional ratings
Review scores
Source	Rating
AllMusic	3.5/5 stars
Dallas Morning News	(B)
Philadelphia Daily News	(B+)

David Rose of The Times wrote: "Anyone with an allergy to Smooth FM should look away now, but fans of slap-bass soul and inoffensive grooves will find much to enjoy from acid jazz survivors Incognito (celebrating their 30th birthday). As befits a anniversary album, this is a rose-tinted exercise in nostalgia, featuring cameos from Chaka Khan and former members of Jamiroquai, Tortured Soul and Earth, Wind & Fire."

Mario Tarradell of the Dallas Morning News in a B review claimed: "Three decades later, Britain's Jean-Paul Maunick keeps Incognito cranking out sophisticated jazz, R&B, funk and disco beats as part of the sorely underrated acid-jazz style."

Thom Jurek of AllMusic in a 3.5/5 star review noted: "Incognito may not be innovating on Transatlantic R.P.M., but in showcasing the many places they've been, and the wide vein they've mined, they don't need to. This is a summertime party record with fine songs and good vibes in abundance."

Jonathan Takiff of the Philadelphia Daily News in a B+ review also declared: "Fresh, horn-blasted soul music has gotten harder to come by on this side of the big pond. But U.K. funkmasters Incognito, led by Jean-Paul "Bluey" Maunick, are keeping the sound alive and well on Transatlantic R.P.M. (Shanachie, B+) with a kick that could rouse even Philly groovemasters Kenny Gamble and Leon Huff from their semiretirement."

== Track listing ==
No.	Title	Writer(s)	Length
1.	"Lowdown"	David Paich, William Scaggs	4:28
2.	"Everything That We Are"	Pete Ray Biggin, Matt Cooper, Francis Hylton, Jean-Paul "Bluey" Maunick, Tommy Woolfolk	3:56
3.	"1975"	Francis Hylton, Jean-Paul "Bluey" Maunick, Joy Rose	4:38
4.	"Your Sun My Sky"	Richard Bull, Jean-Paul "Bluey" Maunick	4:04
5.	"Line In The Sand"	Jean-Paul "Bluey" Maunick, Ski Oakenfull, Leon Ware	4:23
6.	"Gotta"	Pete Ray Biggin, Matt Cooper, Francis Hylton, Jean-Paul "Bluey" Maunick, Ursula Rucker	4:12
7.	"Let's Fall In Love Again"	Pete Ray Biggin, Matt Cooper, Francis Hylton, Jean-Paul "Bluey" Maunick, John Christian Urick	4:23
8.	"The Song"	Pete Ray Biggin, Matt Cooper, Thomas Dyani, Francis Hylton, Chaka Khan, Jean-Paul "Bluey" Maunick	5:09
9.	"Put A Little Lovin' In Your Heart"	Pete Ray Biggin, Matt Cooper, Francis Hylton, Jean-Paul "Bluey" Maunick	5:24
10.	"All of My Life"	Pete Ray Biggin, Matt Cooper, Francis Hylton, Jean-Paul "Bluey" Maunick	4:49
11.	"Expresso Madureira"	Jorjão, Claudio Stevenson	5:27
12.	"Life Ain't Nothing But A Good Thing"	Pete Ray Biggin, Matt Cooper, Francis Hylton, Jean-Paul "Bluey" Maunick	5:59
13.	"Make Room For Love"	Matt Cooper, Jean-Paul "Bluey" Maunick	6:02
14.	"Can't Get Enough"	Mario Biondi, Jean-Paul "Bluey" Maurice, Ski Oakenfull	3:59
15.	"The Winter of My Springs"	Jean-Paul "Bluey" Maunick	00:41
16.	"Tell Me What To Do"	Richard Bull, Jean-Paul "Bluey" Maunick	5:19

== Personnel ==
Musicians

- Graham Harvey – keyboards (1, 14)
- Ski Oakenfull – keyboards (1, 5, 14)
- Matt Cooper – keyboards (2–4, 7, 8–13, 16), string arrangements (10)
- Mo Hausler – programming (15)
- Jean-Paul "Bluey" Maunick – guitars (1–7, 9–14, 16), rhythm guitar (8), string arrangements (10), keyboards (15), bass (15), beats (15)
- Richard Bull – acoustic guitar (4), bass (4), drums (4, 16), keyboards (16), drums (16)
- Al McKay – lead guitar (8), rhythm guitar (8)
- Stuart Zender – bass (1, 14)
- Francis Hylton – bass (2, 3, 5–13, 16), keyboards (3)
- Pete Biggin – drums (1–3, 5–14)
- Thomas Dyani – percussion (1–14)
- Alice Hall – violin (10, 14)

Brass sections

- Paul Greenwood – saxophones (1, 14), flute (1)
- Finn Peters – saxophones (1, 4, 14), flute (1)
- Patrick Clahar – saxophones (2, 3)
- Simon Willescroft – saxophones (6, 11, 16), horn arrangements (6, 11)
- Jim Hunt – saxophones (9, 12)
- Trevor Mines – trombone (1, 4, 14), brass arrangements (1, 4, 14)
- Fayyaz Virji – trombone (2, 3, 9, 12)
- Dave Williamson – trombone (6, 11), horn arrangements (6, 11)
- Sid Gauld – trumpet (1, 4, 11, 14), flugelhorn (16), horn arrangements (16)
- Kevin Robinson – trumpet (2, 3, 13), brass arrangements (2, 3, 13), flugelhorn (10, 13)
- Daniel Carpenter – trumpet (6, 16), horn arrangements (6)
- Dominic Glover – trumpet (9, 12), horn arrangements (9, 12)
- Jean-Paul "Bluey" Maunick – horn arrangements (6, 9–13, 16)
- Matt Cooper – horn arrangements (10)

String section (Tracks 5, 7 & 8)

- Simon Hale – string arrangements and conductor
- Nick Squires – cello
- Bill Hawkes – viola
- Alice Hall, Ben Hancox, Yuri Kalnits, Simon Kodurand and Julian Leaper – violin

Vocalists

- Mario Biondi – lead vocals (1, 14)
- Chaka Khan – lead vocals (1, 8), backing vocals (1, 8)
- Vanessa Haynes – backing vocals (1, 4, 9, 12, 14), lead vocals (12)
- Tony Momrelle – backing vocals (1–5, 9, 10, 12–14, 16), lead vocals (9, 13), vocals (15)
- Joy Rose – backing vocals (1, 3–5, 9, 10, 12, 13, 16), lead vocals (3, 10), vocals (15)
- Luckyiam – lead vocals (2)
- Tiffany Smith – lead vocal fills (2)
- Lurine Cato – backing vocals (3, 5, 16), vocals (15)
- Maysa Leak – lead vocals (4), backing vocals (4)
- Gail Evans – backing vocals (4)
- Leon Ware – lead vocals (5), backing vocals (5)
- Ursula Rucker – lead vocals (6)
- John-Christian Urich – lead vocals (7)
- Jean-Paul "Bluey" Maunick – backing vocals (9, 12, 13, 16), lead vocals (16)
- Hilda Campbell – backing vocals (10)
- Miss Cherokee – backing vocals (13)
- Charlise Rookwood – backing vocals (13)

== Production ==
- Jean-Paul "Bluey" Maunick – producer
- Francis Hylton – producer
- John-Christian Urich – additional production (7), recording (7)
- Mo Hausler – recording, mixing, mastering
- Tim Motzer – vocal recording (6)
- Richard Bull – additional engineer
- Dilip Harris – additional engineer
- Joshua Minyard – additional engineer
- Andy Savours – additional engineer
- Tom Stanley – additional engineer
- Ken Karner – design
- Cerraeh Laykin – photography
- Nigel Conway – management
- Takami Maunick – executive assistant
