= Eleven (Incognito album) =

Studio album by Incognito
- Released: January 24, 2006
- Genre: Jazz fusion
- Length: 58:41
- Label: Dome
- Producer: Jean-Paul Maunick; Simon Cotsworth; Matt Cooper; Ski Oakenfull

Incognito chronology
Adventures in Black Sunshine (2004)	Eleven (2006)	Bees + Things + Flowers (2006)

Eleven is an album by the British acid jazz band Incognito, released in 2005 on Dome Records. The album peaked at No. 2 on the US Billboard Top Contemporary Jazz Albums chart and No. 52 on the US Billboard Top R&B/Hip-Hop Albums chart.

== Critical reception ==
Professional ratings
Review scores
Source	Rating
AllMusic	3.5 stars

Paula Edelstein of AllMusic called Eleven "a sleek, pop/jazz offering that will have you swinging and swaying to their groovy guitars, big horns, and soulful vocals...The soulful vocals of Maysa Leak and Imaani bring a great dimension to Jean-Paul "Bluey" Maunick's company and it's definitely a keeper."

== Track listing ==
No.	Title	Writer(s)	Length
1.	"Let the Mystery Be"	Matt Cooper, Francis Hylton, Jean-Paul "Bluey" Maunick, Tony Remy Incognito	6:50
2.	"We Got Music"	Francis Hylton, Jean-Paul "Bluey" Maunick, Tony Remy	5:24
3.	"Come Away with Me"	Matt Cooper, Jean-Paul "Bluey" Maunick	7:04
4.	"Baby It's Alright"	Jean-Paul "Bluey" Maunick, Tony Remy	4:36
5.	"When Tomorrow Brings You Down"	Matt Cooper, Jean-Paul "Bluey" Maunick	3:41
6.	"Jacaranda"	Dominic Glover, Jean-Paul "Bluey" Maunick, Ski Oakenfull	6:20
7.	"Show Me Love"	Jean-Paul "Bluey" Maunick, Ski Oakenfull	5:38
8.	"Will I Ever Learn?"	Matt Cooper, Jean Paul "Bluey" Maunick	4:40
9.	"I'll Get By"	Jean-Paul "Bluey" Maunick, Ski Oakenfull	5:09
10.	"It's Just One of Those Things"	Jean-Paul "Bluey" Maunick, Ski Oakenfull	4:58
11.	"As Long as It's You"	Graham Harvey, Jean-Paul "Bluey" Maunick	4:21

== Personnel ==
Musicians

- Matt Cooper – Fender Rhodes (1), keyboards (3, 5, 8), bass (3), drums (3), percussion (3)
- Ski Oakenfull – synthesizers (1), drum programming (3, 7, 9), keyboards (6, 9, 10), percussion programming (7, 10)
- Graham Harvey – Fender Rhodes (4, 11)
- Jean-Paul "Bluey" Maunick – guitars (1, 2, 4, 5, 7, 9–11), acoustic guitar (6)
- Tony Remy – guitars (1–6, 8–11), vocoder (2), guitar solo (7)
- Francis Hylton – bass (1, 2, 4–6, 8–11), Fender Rhodes (2)
- Richard Bailey – drums (1, 4, 8)
- Daniel "Venom" Maunick – beats (2, 5)
- Shawn Lee – drums (6, 10, 11)
- Joao Bosco De Oliveira – percussion (1–3, 5, 6, 9, 10)

Brass section

- Jean-Paul "Bluey" Maunick – brass arrangements (1–3, 5–11)
- Jim Hunt – tenor saxophone (1, 5–8)
- Andy Ross – tenor saxophone (2, 3, 7, 10, 11)
- Ed Jones – tenor saxophone (3, 7)
- Nichol Thomson – trombone (1–3, 5–11), brass arrangements (1, 5, 8, 9)
- Trevor Mines – trombone (3, 7)
- Dominic Glover – flugelhorn (1, 2, 5, 6, 8, 10, 11), trumpet (1–3, 5, 7–11), brass arrangements (2, 3, 5–7, 9–11)
- Tom Rees-Roberts – trumpet (3, 7)

Vocalists

- Gail Evans – vocals (1), backing vocals (2–5)
- Jean-Paul "Bluey" Maunick – vocals (1), backing vocals (2–4, 7, 9, 11)
- Tony Momrelle – vocals (1), lead vocals (2, 9, 10), backing vocals (2–5, 9, 10)
- Imaani – vocals (1), lead vocals (2, 4, 11), backing vocals (2–5)
- Maysa Leak – lead vocals (3, 5, 8, 10), backing vocals (5, 8, 10)
- Tyrone Henry – backing vocals (3, 4)
- Carleen Anderson – lead vocals (7)

== Production ==
- Jean-Paul "Bluey" Maunick – A&R, producer
- Simon Cotsworth – producer, mixing
- Matt Cooper – co-producer (3, 5)
- Dominic "Ski" Oakenfull – co-producer (7, 9, 10)
- Stuart Hawkes – mastering at Metropolis Mastering (London, England)
- Amanda Searle – photography
- Andrew Carver – photography assistant
- Robin Cotsworth – design
- Tinku Bhattacharyya – management
