= Bees + Things + Flowers =

Studio album by Incognito
- Released: 2006
- Studios: Angel Recording Studios and The Town House (London, England)
- Genre: Jazz fusion
- Length: 51:24
- Label: Dome Records
- Producers: Jean-Paul Maunick; Simon Cotsworth

Incognito chronology
Eleven (2005)	Bees + Things + Flowers (2006)	Tales From The Beach (2008)

Bees + Things + Flowers is an album by the British acid jazz band Incognito, released in 2006 on Dome Records. The album peaked at No. 8 on the US Billboard Top Contemporary Jazz Albums chart.

== Critical reception ==
Professional ratings
Review scores
Source	Rating
AllMusic	3.5/5 stars
Buffalo News	3/4 stars

Roshod D. Ollison of the Baltimore Sun, with praised wrote, "The most ubiquitous trend of 2006 was the covers project. But this British soul-jazz outfit brought a unique approach to it...Seductive and as soothing as a hot toddy, Bees&Things& Flowers hasn't left my CD changer or my iPod."

Jonathan Widran of AllMusic, in a 3.5/5-star review, found "on this typically dreamy, cool vibin' and supersensual release, they picked up on the ubiquitous genre trend of 2006 -- doing lots of cover versions...the deep soul vibe is everything, so whether they're doing old pop songs, remakes of their own tunes, or originals, we're still dancing in the laid-back late summer sunshine.

Jeff Miers of the Buffalo News, in a 3/4-star review, hailed the album saying, "With the help of vocalists Joy Rose, Carleen Anderson and Tony Momrelle, Maunik has crafted a gorgeous vibe of a record, one that employs jazz chords over pop-soul rhythms and dulcet, romantic vocal tones. It could all be truly cheesy, but Maunik's sensibilities as composer and manipulator of grooves keep things on the soulful side of the tracks throughout."

== Track listing ==
No.	Title	Writer(s)	Length
1.	"Everybody Loves the Sunshine"	Roy Ayers	4:17
2.	"Everyday"	Peter Hinds, Jean-Paul "Bluey" Maunick	4:05
3.	"Summer in the City"	Steve Boone, John Sebastian, Mark Sebastian	4:45
4.	"Always There"	William Jeffrey, Ronnie Laws	2:30
5.	"Raise"	Jean-Paul "Bluey" Maunick, Ski Oakenfull	3:18
6.	"Still a Friend of Mine"	Richard Bull, Jean-Paul "Bluey" Maunick	5:39
7.	"Tin Man"	Dewey Bunnell	3:28
8.	"Crave"	Matt Cooper, Jean-Paul "Bluey" Maunick	5:32
9.	"Deep Waters"	Richard Bull, Jean-Paul "Bluey" Maunick	4:58
10.	"You Are Golden"	Jean-Paul "Bluey" Maunick	3:52
11.	"That's the Way of the World"	Charles Stepney, Maurice White, Verdine White	9:00

== Personnel ==
Musicians

- Matt Cooper – grand piano, Fender Rhodes, drums (1, 8)
- Ski Oakenfull – celesta (1), kalimba (1), grand piano (5), Hammond organ (5)
- Tony Remy – acoustic guitars, bouzouki
- Jean-Paul "Bluey" Maunick – acoustic guitar (4, 5), arrangements (5, 10)
- Francis Hylton – bass
- Richard Bailey – drums (2–4, 6, 7, 9–11)
- Luke Parkhouse – drums (5)
- Karl Van Den Bossche – percussion

Horn section (Tracks 3, 7 & 11)

- Andy Ross – tenor saxophone, flutes, voices (5, 10)
- Trevor Mines – trombone, euphonium,
- Sid Gauld – flugelhorn, voices (5, 10)
- Dominic Glover – flugelhorn (7, 11), horn arrangements

The Millenia Ensemble

- Simon Hale – string arrangements and conductor
- Jonathan Brigden – string session coordinator
- Ian Burdge and Chris Worsey – cello
- Celine Saout – harp
- Reiad Chibah, John Metcalfe and Adrian Smith – viola
- Gillon Cameron, Louisa Fuller, Cath Haggo, Everton Nelson, Lucy Wilkins and Warren Zielinski – first violin
- Alison Dods, Richard George, Darragh Morgan and Helena Wood – second violin

Vocalists

- Tyrone Henry – vocals
- Jean-Paul "Bluey" Maunick – backing vocals
- Joy Rose – lead vocals (1)
- Imaani – lead vocals (2, 8)
- Carleen Anderson – lead vocals (3, 7, 11)
- Jocelyn Brown – lead vocals (4, 5)
- Sarah Brown – vocals (6)
- Maysa Leak – lead vocals (6, 9, 11), backing vocals (6, 9, 11)
- Tony Momrelle – lead vocals (6, 10)

== Production ==
- Jean-Paul "Bluey" Maunick – producer
- Simon Cotsworth – co-producer, recording, mixing
- Donald Clark – assistant engineer
- Niall Acott – string recording
- Stuart Hawkes – mastering at Metropolis Mastering (London, England)
- Mitchy Bwoy – design, photography
- Tinku Bhattachayyra – management
