= Adventures in Black Sunshine =

Studio album by Incognito
- Released: August 10, 2004
- Studios: The Blue Room (London, UK)
- Genre: Jazz fusion
- Length: 1:14:29
- Label: Dome
- Producers: Jean-Paul Maunick; Simon Cotsworth

Incognito chronology
Who Needs Love (2003)	Adventures in Black Sunshine (2004)	Eleven (2005)

Adventures in Black Sunshine is an album by the British acid jazz band Incognito, released in 2004 on Dome Records. The album peaked at No. 23 on the UK Independent Albums Chart and No. 8 on the US Billboard Top Contemporary Jazz Albums chart.

== Critical reception ==
Professional ratings
Review scores
Source	Rating
AllMusic	4/5 stars
Dayton Daily News	(B)

Within his B review, Otis Gowens of the Dayton Daily News claimed, "Sexy-soul swinging music; a likely description for Adventures in Black Sunshine (Narada Jazz/Rice) by Incognito."

Johnathan Widran of AllMusic, in a 4/5-star review exclaimed, "The big story on 2003's Who Needs Love was the inclusion of a Brazilian vibe via Ed Motta, and here it's the return after several albums of the honey soul-voiced Maysa Leak, who was a big part of the group's rise to acid jazz prominence in the early '90s...Even with some 1,000 musicians passing through Incognito's ever-revolving doors and ever-evolving sound, Maunick's admiration for the soul music that first inspired him comes through brilliantly every time out."

== Track listing ==
No.	Title	Writer(s)	Length
1.	"Don't Turn My Love Away"	M.H. Cooper, Jean-Paul "Bluey" Maunick	4:54
2.	"Everything Your Heart Desires"	Maunick	4:15
3.	"Close My Eyes"	Maunick, Jamie Norton	3:28
4.	"The 25th Chapter"	Maunick	6:13
5.	"True to Myself"	Maunick	5:03
6.	"The Principles of Love"	Maunick	7:38
7.	"This Thing Called Love"	Maunick, Norton	3:12
8.	"Fences and Barriers"	Maunick	4:09
9.	"Mindin' My Business"	Maunick	8:13
10.	"Autumn Song"	Graham Harvey, Maunick	5:42
11.	"Listen to the Music"	Tom Johnston	4:49
12.	"Mr. Jones"	Maunick	4:34
13.	"The World Is Mine"	Maunick	7:35
14.	"Beyond the Clouds"	Harvey, Maunick	4:44

== Personnel ==
Musicians

- Matt Cooper – keyboards (1), acoustic piano (1), electric piano (1, 10), synthesizers (10), organ (11)
- Ski Oakenfull – additional string programming (1), keyboards (2, 4–6, 8, 11, 12), string arrangements (2, 8, 10), bass (5, 6, 9, 11), drum programming (5, 9, 12), acoustic piano (9, 13), electric piano (9), clavinet (9), synthesizers (9, 13), string programming (10), Rhodes electric piano (11), arrangements (11), Fender Rhodes solo (13), kalimba (13)
- Jamie Norton – keyboards (3), Wurlitzer electric piano (7)
- George Duke – Fender Rhodes (9)
- Nichol Thomson – vocoder (9), Fender bass (9)
- Graham Harvey – Fender Rhodes (10, 14), bass (10)
- Jean-Paul "Bluey" Maunick – guitars (2–6, 8–14), string arrangements (2, 8, 10), arrangements (11)
- Julian Crampton – bass (1, 13)
- Neville Malcolm – bass (2–4, 12, 14)
- Richard Bailey – drums (1–4, 8–10, 13, 14)
- Daniel "Venom" Maunick – drum programming (6, 11), percussion programming (11)
- Thomas Dyani-Akuru – percussion (1–6, 8–10, 13, 14)

Brass section

- Jean-Paul "Bluey" Maunick – brass arrangements (1, 2, 5, 6, 10–14)
- Andy Ross – saxophones (1–6, 9–12, 14), flutes (3–6, 8, 10, 13), tenor saxophone (13)
- Chris De Margary – soprano saxophone (13)
- Nichol Thomson – trombone (1–6, 9–14), brass arrangements (9)
- Dominic Glover – trumpet (1–6, 9–14), brass arrangements (1–6, 10–14), flugelhorn (10, 13, 14)

Vocalists

- Maysa Leak – lead vocals (1, 2, 5, 6, 8, 10, 11), backing vocals (1, 2, 6, 8, 11)
- Sarah Brown – backing vocals (1, 5)
- Gail Evans – backing vocals (1–3, 5, 6, 8, 10, 11, 13)
- Tony Momrelle – backing vocals (1–3, 5, 6, 8, 10–13), lead vocals (3), vocals (7, 14)
- Jean-Paul "Bluey" Maunick – backing vocals (2, 3, 5, 6, 12), vocals (14)
- Tyrone Henry – backing vocals (3, 8, 10–12), vocals (14)
- Imaani – backing vocals (3, 8, 10–12, 14), lead vocals (12)

== Production ==
- Jean-Paul Maunick – A&R direction, producer, liner notes
- Simon Cotsworth – producer, recording, mixing
- Matt Cooper – additional production (1)
- Dominic Oakenfull – additional production (5, 11, 12)
- Daniel Maunick – additional production (13)
- Geoff Pesche – mastering at The Town House (London, UK)
- Sam Bannister – design
- Amanda Searle – photography
- Andrew Carver – photography assistant
- Shelton Miranda – wardrobe
- Stephen King and Pete Jackson for Creation Management – management
- Steve Chapman and Ron Moss for Chapman Management – management (USA)
