= Who Needs Love (album) =

Studio album by Incognito
- Released: April 29, 2003
- Studios: Angel Recording Studios and The Blue Room (London, England); Nasty Audio Australia
- Genre: Jazz fusion
- Length: 58:18
- Label: Dome
- Producers: Jean-Paul "Bluey" Maunick; Simon Cotsworth; Ski Oakenfull; Matt Cooper; Simon Grey

Incognito chronology
Life, Stranger than Fiction (2001)	Who Needs Love (2003)	Adventures in Black Sunshine (2004)

Who Needs Love is an album by the British acid jazz band Incognito, released in 2003 on Dome Records. The album peaked at No. 22 on the UK R&B Albums Chart and No. 7 on the US Billboard Top Contemporary Jazz Albums chart.

== Critical reception ==
Professional ratings
Review scores
Source	Rating
AllMusic	3/5 stars

Johnathan Widran of AllMusic noted, "the band has stayed true to the original vision of frontman/guitarist Jean-Paul "Bluey" Maunick, and that means, even post-millennium, a liberal mix of jazz, house, groovalicious funk, worldbeat, colorful female vocals, and most of the times, snazzy horn sections. The band's Narada Jazz debut, Who Needs Love also includes spicy touches of soaring Brazilian energy (think whimsical, Sergio Mendes circa mid-'60s), with guest vocalist Ed Motta singing both words and scat over punchy horns, and a thumping disco beat."

== Track listing ==
No.	Title	Writer(s)	Length
1.	"Who Needs Love"	Jean-Paul Maunick, Julian Crampton, Ed Motta	5:16
2.	"Can't Get You Out Of My Head"	Maunick, Jamie Norton	4:33
3.	"People At The Top"	Maunick, Dominic Oakenfull	4:44
4.	"Morning Sun"	Maunick, Matt Cooper, Joy Rose	4:34
5.	"Stone Cold Heart"	Maunick, Joy Malcolm	6:05
6.	"Cada Dia (Day By Day)"	Maunick, Cooper, Nichol Thomson	4:48
7.	"If You Want My Love"	Maunick, Graham Harvey, Paige Lackey	4:04
8.	"Don't Be A Fool"	Maunick, Mark Edwards	4:54
9.	"Byrd Plays"	Maunick, Cooper	5:33
10.	"Where Love Shines"	Maunick, Simon Grey	6:51
11.	"Did We Really Ever Try"	Maunick, Edwards	6:17
12.	"Blue (I'm Still Here With You)"	Maunick, Kelli Sae, Paul Weller	5:56
13.	"Fly"	Maunick, Cooper, Crampton, Dominic Glover	4:24

== Personnel ==
Musicians

- Matt Cooper – Fender Rhodes (1, 5, 6, 9, 13), Hammond organ (3), Hohner D6 clavinet (3, 6, 13), keyboards (4), acoustic piano (5, 9), synthesizers (9), KAT mallet synthesizer (9)
- Jamie Norton – Fender Rhodes (2)
- Ski Oakenfull – Wurlitzer electric piano (3), bass (3), drums (3), percussion (3)
- Graham Harvey – Fender Rhodes (7)
- Mark Edwards – acoustic piano (8), Wurlitzer electric piano (8, 11), bass (8, 11)
- Simon Grey – Fender Rhodes (9), keyboards (9), drum programming (9)
- John Deley – synthesizers (11)
- Paul Weller – Fender Rhodes (12), acoustic guitar (12)
- Jean-Paul "Bluey" Maunick – guitars (1–11, 13), brass arrangements (1, 9, 12), acoustic guitar (12), electric guitar (12)
- Julian Crampton – bass (1, 2, 4, 6, 7, 12, 13)
- Andy Kremer – acoustic bass (5)
- Alex Malherios – bass (9)
- Gavin W. Pearce – bass (10)
- Richard Bailey – drums (1, 2, 5, 6, 11, 13)
- Daniel "Venom" Maunick – drum programming (4, 5, 8)
- Andy Gangadeen – drums (7)
- Ian Thomas – drums (12)
- Karl Van Den Bossche – percussion (1, 6, 13)
- Martin Verdonk – congas (2, 4, 9–11), hand percussion (2, 4, 9–11), effects (9)
- Andy Ross – alto saxophone (1, 13), flute (4–6), tenor saxophone (6)
- Chris De Margary – baritone saxophone (1), tenor saxophone (1, 13), soprano saxophone (9), saxophones (10, 12), flute (12)
- Ed Jones – tenor saxophone (1, 13), saxophones (3, 4, 12)
- Nichol Thomson – trombone (1, 3, 4, 6, 8–10, 12, 13), brass arrangements (3, 4, 6)
- Dominic Glover – trumpet (1, 3, 4, 6, 8–10, 12, 13), brass arrangements (1, 3, 4, 8–10, 12, 13), flugelhorn (13)

Millennia Strings

- Simon Hale – string and harp arrangements, conductor
- Giles Broadbent – string leader
- Mike Hornett – music preparation
- Ian Burdge and Chris Worsey – cello
- Camilla Pay – harp
- Reiad Chibah and Vince Greene – viola
- Giles Broadbent, Michael Gray, Stephen Hussey, Sally Jackson, Rebecca Jones, Darragh Morgan, Everton Nelson, John Smart and Matthew Ward – violin

Vocalists

- Ed Motta – vocal dialect and effects (1)
- Joy Rose – lead vocals (2, 4, 11), backing vocals (2, 4, 11)
- Xavier Bannett – backing vocals (2, 3, 8–10)
- Tony Momrelle – backing vocals (2, 3, 8–10), vocals (6)
- Kelli Sae – lead vocals (3, 8, 10, 12), backing vocals (3, 8, 10, 12)
- Luaraine McIntosh – backing vocals (4)
- Joy Malcolm – lead vocals (5, 7), backing vocals (5)
- Paige Lackey – backing vocals (7), BGV arrangements (7)
- Martin Verdonk – voice (9)

== Production ==
- Jean-Paul "Bluey" Maunick – A&R, producer
- Terry Washizu – A&R
- Simon Cotsworth – producer, recording, mixing, mastering
- Dominic "Ski" Oakenfull – producer (3)
- Matt Cooper – producer (4, 9)
- Simon Grey – producer (10)
- Ian Sherwin – recording
- Tom Jenkins – string recording
- Mat Bartram – string recording assistant
- Karl Injex – BGV recording (7) in Atlanta, Georgia
- Martin Granville-Twig – mastering
- The Blue Room and Metropolis Mastering (London, England) – mastering locations
- Pete Jackson – project coordinator
- Gautam Lewis – coordinating assistant
- Rick Lecoat – art direction, design
- Amanda Searle – photography
- Whylie Rookwood – stylist
- Stephen King and Ricochet – management
- Jonathan Brigden – management for Millennia Strings

== Charts ==
Chart (2003)	Peak position
Italy (FIMai)	38
UK Hip Hop and R&B Albums (Official Charts)	22
US Top Contemporary Jazz Albums (Billboard)	7
US Top R&B/Hip-Hop Albums (Billboard)	74
