= Positivity (album) =

Studio album by Incognito
- Released: 1993
- Studios: Parkgate (East Sussex, UK); Swanyard, Metropolis and The Hit Factory (London, UK); Opaz (East London, UK); Bump City (Los Angeles, California, USA)
- Genre: Acid jazz
- Length: 66:27
- Labels: Talkin' Loud; Verve Forecast
- Producers: Jean-Paul "Bluey" Maunick; Richard Bull; Ray Hayden

Incognito chronology
Tribes, Vibes + Scribes (1992)	Positivity (1993)	100° and Rising (1995)

Positivity is an album by the British band Incognito, released in 1993. The band supported the album with a North American tour.

The album peaked at No. 55 on the UK Albums Chart. The album peaked at No. 2 on the US Billboard Top Contemporary Jazz Albums chart. It has sold more than 350,000 copies in the United States.

== Production ==
The album was produced by band leader Jean-Paul "Bluey" Maunick. He was chiefly inspired by Stevie Wonder's Talking Book and Innervisions.

== Critical reception ==
Professional ratings
Review scores
Source	Rating
AllMusic	4/5 stars
Calgary Herald	B
The Encyclopedia of Popular Music	4/5 stars
MusicHound R&B: The Essential Album Guide	3.5/5 stars
USA Today	3.5/4 stars

The Washington Post wrote that "the band mines familiar funk grooves with more than enough imagination and horn power to keep things fresh." The Calgary Herald praised the "free flowing numbers that eschew harder edge riffs for music suited more for spliffs." USA Today stated that "the commercially oriented backbeats and vocals (more singing than on their previous two albums) are counterbalanced by a tight horn section and jazzy, crisp arrangements."

The Orange County Register opined that "the strength lies in vocalists Maysa Leak and Mark Anthoni, whose rich-sounding voices glide through each track as easily as a hot spoon through ice cream." The Atlanta Journal-Constitution listed Positivity as one of the best R&B albums of 1994.

AllMusic wrote that "group leader Jean-Paul 'Bluey' Maunick's vision of intertwine various genres of music (bebop, soul, classical, dance, etc.) into one incomparable sound is exemplary." MusicHound R&B: The Essential Album Guide called "Deep Waters" a "landmark acid-jazz track."

== Track listing ==
No.	Title	Writer(s)	Length
1.	"Step into My Life"	Jean-Paul Maunick, Richard Bull, Peter Hinds	4:13
2.	"Still a Friend of Mine"	Maunick, Bull	5:37
3.	"Smiling Faces"	Maunick, Graham Harvey, Ray Hayden	5:09
4.	"Where Do We Go from Here"	Maunick, Hayden	5:21
5.	"Positivity"	Maunick, Bull, Randy Hope-Taylor	3:51
6.	"Inversions"	Maunick, Max Beesley	5:54
7.	"Givin' It Up"	Maunick, Bull	5:08
8.	"Talkin' Loud"	Maunick, Bull, Harvey	3:28
9.	"Deep Waters"	Maunick, Bull	6:37
10.	"Do Right"	Maunick, Harvey, Hayden	5:29
11.	"Pieces of a Dream"	Maunick, Bull	4:19
12.	"Thinking 'Bout Tomorrow"	Maunick, Bull, Fayyaz Virji	5:53
13.	"Keep the Fires Burning"	Maunick, Hayden	5:20
Total length:			66:27

== Personnel ==
Incognito

- Mark Anthoni – lead vocals, backing vocals
- Maysa Leak – lead vocals, backing vocals
- Graham Harvey – keyboards, vocoder keyboard, synth bass
- Jean-Paul "Bluey" Maunick – keyboards, vocoder voice, guitars, drum and percussion programming
- Peter Hinds – keyboards
- Randy Hope-Taylor – bass
- Richard Bailey – drums
- Thomas Dyani – percussion
- Patrick Clahar – soprano saxophone, tenor saxophone
- Fayyaz Virji – trombone
- Kevin Robinson – trumpet, flugelhorn
- Sarah Brown – backing vocals

Additional musicians

- Richard Bull – keyboards, guitars, bass programming, drum and percussion programming
- Joel "Tyrell" LeBlanc – programming (2, 4)
- Max Beesley – additional keyboards (5)
- Ray Hayden – bass programming, drum and percussion programming, backing vocals (10, 13)
- Paul "Tubbs" Williams – bass (5)
- Bud Beadle – baritone saxophone, flute

Production

- Guy Eckstein – A&R direction (USA)
- Gilles Peterson – A&R direction
- Jean-Paul Maunick – producer, mixing (1, 3–9, 11, 12)
- Richard Bull – co-producer (1–3, 5, 7–9, 11, 12), recording, mixing (1, 3, 4, 7–9, 11, 12)
- Ray Hayden – co-producer (4, 10, 13), recording, mixing (10, 13)
- Ron Aslan – recording, mixing (6)
- Simon Catsworth – recording, mixing (1, 3, 4, 7–9, 11, 12)
- Joel "Tyrell" LeBlanc – mixing (3, 5)
- Goetz Botzenhardt – assistant engineer
- Ruadhri Cushnan – assistant engineer
- Doug Cook – assistant engineer
- Kevin Jacobs – assistant engineer
- Matt Sime – assistant engineer
- Geoff Pesche – mastering at The Town House (London, UK)
- Fiona Grimshaw – product manager (UK)
- Ben Mundy – product manager (USA)
- Chris Maguire – release production (USA)
- Green Ink – art direction
- Swifty Typographics – sleeve design
- Richard Croft – photography

== Charts ==
Chart (1993)	Peak position
Australian Albums (ARIA)	108
US Top R&B Albums (Billboard)	53
US Heatseekers Albums (Billboard)	13
US Top Contemporary Jazz Albums (Billboard)	2
UK Pop Albums (Official Charts)	55
