= No Time Like the Future =

No Time Like The Future

Studio album by Incognito
- Released: 1999
- Studios: Angel Recording Studios and The Blue Room (London, UK)
- Genre: Jazz fusion
- Length: 60:34
- Label: Talkin' Loud
- Producer: Jean-Paul "Bluey" Maunick

Incognito chronology
Beneath the Surface (1996)	No Time Like The Future (1999)	Life, Stranger than Fiction (2001)

No Time Like The Future is an album by the British acid jazz band Incognito, released in 1999 on Talkin' Loud Records. It was produced by band leader Jean-Paul "Bluey" Maunick.

The album peaked at No. 9 on the UK R&B Albums Chart and No. 4 on the US Billboard Top Contemporary Jazz Albums chart.

== Singles ==
A cover of The Jones Girls' "Nights Over Egypt" reached No. 2 on the UK Dance Singles Chart, No. 12 on the UK R&B Singles Chart and No. 38 on the US Billboard Dance Club Songs chart.

== Track listing ==
No.	Title	Writer(s)	Length
1.	"Wild and Peaceful"	Jean-Paul Maunick, Dominic Oakenfull	5:46
2.	"Get into My Groove"	Maunick, Oakenfull	4:59
3.	"It Ain't Easy"	Maunick, Graham Harvey	6:17
4.	"Marrakech"	Maunick, Harvey, Randy Hope-Taylor	6:42
5.	"Fearless"	Maunick, Oakenfull	6:14
6.	"Nights Over Egypt"	Cynthia Biggs, Dexter Wansel	6:49
7.	"Center of the Sun"	Maunick, Harvey	5:02
8.	"More of Myself"	Maunick	4:54
9.	"I Can See the Future"	Maunick, Harvey, Hope-Taylor	8:15
10.	"Black Rain"	Maunick, Harvey	10:52

== Personnel ==
The Incognito Family

- Karen Bernod – lead vocals, backing vocals
- Jocelyn Brown – lead vocals, backing vocals
- Maysa Leak – lead vocals, backing vocals
- Jean-Paul "Bluey" Maunick – keyboards, guitars, backing vocals, horn arrangements
- Graham Harvey – keyboards, drum programming
- Ski Oakenfull – keyboards, additional drum programming, backing vocals
- Gary Sanctuary – keyboards
- Julian Crampton – bass
- Randy Hope-Taylor – bass
- Richard Bailey – drums
- Max Beesley – drums
- Simon Cotsworth – drum programming
- Daniel Maunick – drum programming, effects
- Alex Rizzo – additional drum programming
- Thomas Dyani-Akuru – percussion
- Bud Beadle – alto saxophone
- Chris De Margary – baritone saxophone, soprano saxophone, tenor saxophone, flutes
- Ed Jones – alto saxophone, soprano saxophone, tenor saxophone, bass clarinet, flute
- Matt Coleman – trombone
- Adrian Fry – trombone
- Fayyaz Virji – trombone
- Dominic Glover – trumpet, flugelhorn, horn arrangements
- Kevin Robinson – trumpet, flugelhorn, horn arrangements
- Simon Hale – string arrangements and conductor
- Chris Ballin – backing vocals
- Veronique De Margary – backing vocals
- Valerie Etienne – backing vocals
- Paul Lewis – backing vocals
- Charlise Rockwood – backing vocals
- Ogadinma Umelo –backing vocals

Guest musicians

- Irakere Horn Section
- Roman Filiu – alto saxophone
- Irving Acao – tenor saxophone
- Basilio Marquéz – trumpet
- Julio Padrón – trumpet, horn arrangements

== Production ==
- Gilles Peterson – A&R direction
- Jean-Paul "Bluey" Maunick – producer, mixing
- Simon Cotsworth – producer, recording, mixing
- Tom Jenkins – string recording
- Steve Price – string recording
- Stuart Hawkes – mastering at Metropolis Mastering (London, UK)
- Tom Bird – art direction
- Rick Lecoat – design
- Blinkk – photography
- Sharon Blankson – fashion stylist
- Alison Butler – grooming stylist

== Charts ==
Chart (1999)	Peak position
Switzerland (Hitparade)	47
UK Albums (Official Charts)	82
UK Hip Hop and R&B Albums (Official Charts)	9
US Heatseekers Albums (Billboard)	28
US Top Contemporary Jazz Albums (Billboard)	4
