= Beneath the Surface (Incognito album) =

Studio album by Incognito
- Released: 1996
- Studios: The Church, Livingston Studios, Marcus Recording Studios, Metropolis Studios, Roundhouse Studios, Trident Studios and Westside Studios (London, England, UK); Master Rock Studios (North London, England, UK); Master Sound Astoria (Astoria, New York, USA)
- Genre: Jazz fusion
- Length: 71:16
- Label: Talkin' Loud
- Producer: Jean-Paul "Bluey" Maunick

Incognito chronology
100° and Rising (1995)	Beneath the Surface (1996)	No Time like The Future (1999)

Beneath the Surface is an album by the British acid jazz band Incognito, released in 1996 on Talkin' Loud Records. The album peaked at No. 11 on the UK R&B Albums Chart and No. 2 on the US Billboard Top Contemporary Jazz Albums chart.

== Production ==
The album was produced by band leader Jean-Paul "Bluey" Maunick.

== Singles ==
Out of the Storm reached No. 13 on the UK Hip Hop and R&B Singles Chart and No. 18 on the UK Dance Singles Chart.

== Critical reception ==
Professional ratings
Review scores
Source	Rating
AllMusic	4/5 stars

Leo Stanley of AllMusic, in a 3-out-of-5 star review, claimed "Beneath the Surface finds original lead singer Maysa Leak returning to the Incognito fold. Coincidentally or not, the record finds the group moving deeply into smooth, laidback, jazzy soul. It's a seductive sound and the group executes it well, even though there ironically isn't that much substance beneath the surface."

== Track listing ==
All tracks are written by Jean-Paul Maunick.

No.	Title	Writer(s)	Length
1.	"Solar Fire"		2:11
2.	"Labour of Love"	Maunick, Graham Harvey	6:46
3.	"Beneath the Surface"	Maunick, Harvey	5:42
4.	"A Shade of Blue"	Maunick, Harvey	5:45
5.	"Without You"	Maunick, Harvey	7:20
6.	"Misunderstood"		5:05
7.	"Hold Onto Me"	Maunick, Randy Hope-Taylor	5:23
8.	"Living Against the River"	Maunick, Harvey	4:21
9.	"She Wears Black"	Maunick, Hope-Taylor	8:46
10.	"Fountain of Life"	Maunick, Harvey	5:19
11.	"Out of the Storm"	Maunick, Harvey	3:49
12.	"Dark Side of the Cog"		6:27
13.	"All That You Want Me to Be" (U.S. bonus track)	Maunick, Jay Daniels	4:22
14.	"Sunchild" (U.S. bonus track)	Maunick, Harvey	4:16

== Personnel ==
Musicians and Vocalists

- Graham Harvey – keyboards (1–11, 14)
- Peter Hinds – keyboards (11)
- Gary Sanctuary – keyboards (11), Minimoog (13)
- Jay Daniels – keyboard programming (13), bass and drum programming (13)
- Jean-Paul "Bluey" Maunick – guitars (1–3, 5–7, 9, 11, 13–14), acoustic guitar (4, 10), backing vocals (5, 8, 11), keyboards (12–13), synth bass (12), drum programming (13), voices (13–14)
- Randy Hope-Taylor – bass (1–11, 14)
- Richard Bailey – drums (1–12)
- Andy Gagadene – drums (14)
- Max Beesley – percussion (1–10), keyboards (11–12)
- Thomas Dyani – percussion (14)
- Chris Ballin – lead vocals (2, 8), backing vocals (2–4, 8, 10–11, 13), vocals (5)
- Maysa Leak – lead vocals (3–4, 6–7, 11, 13), backing vocals (3, 6–7, 13)
- Imani Uzuri – lead vocals (10)
- Claudia Fontaine – backing vocals (2, 4, 8, 10–11)
- Ray Simpson – backing vocals (2, 8, 10–11)
- Sophia Jones – backing vocals (10–11)

Horns

- Jean-Paul "Bluey" Maunick – horn arrangements (1–3, 5, 7–9)
- Bob Belden – horn arrangements and conductor (NYC Horns: 2, 3, 7–9)
- Chris "Snake" Davis – baritone saxophone (1), tenor saxophone (1)
- Ed Jones – tenor saxophone (1, 8–9), saxophones (5–6, 10–12, 14), sax solo (5), soprano saxophone (7, 9)
- Chris De Margary – saxophones (10, 14), flute (11)
- Fayyaz Virji – trombone (1), horn arrangements (1, 5)
- Jimmy Bosch – trombone (2, 12)
- Avi Lebovich – trombone (10–11, 14)
- Duncan McKay – trumpet (1)
- Alex Norris – trumpet (3, 9–10, 12–14), flugelhorn (3–4, 14)

New York City Horns (Tracks 2–3, 7–9)

- Ken Hitchcock – alto flute, flute
- Ed Xiques – flute
- Ronnie Cuber – baritone saxophone
- Tim Ries – tenor saxophone
- Michael Davis – bass trombone, trombone
- Charley Gordon – trombone
- Donald Downs, Greg Gisbert, Tim Hagans and Tony Kadleck – trumpet, flugelhorn

New York City Strings (Tracks 2–7 & 9)

- Jean-Paul "Bluey" Maunick – string arrangements
- Bob Belden – string arrangements, string conductor
- Sanford Allen – concertmaster
- Jeanne Leblanc, Caryl Paisner, Sarah Seiver and Bruce Wang – cello
- Richard Brice, John Dexter, Jesse Levine and Liuh-Wen Ting – viola
- Sanford Allen, Sandra Billingslea, Kurt Briggs, Kurt Coble, Marshall Coid, Barry Finclair, Winterton Garvey, Stanley Hunte, Jean Ingraham, Rebekah Johnson, Diane Monroe, Rudy Perrault, Marion Pinheiro, Sheila Reinhold, Elliot Rosoff, Myra Segal, Aaron Stolow, Yuri Vodovoz, Alexander Vselensky Paul Woodiel, Ming Yeh and Xin Zhao – violin

== Production ==
- Jean-Paul "Bluey" Maunick – producer, mix assistant
- Simon Cotsworth – recording, mixing
- John Gallen – additional recording
- Robin Laybourne – assistant engineer
- Gareth Ashton – studio assistant
- Simon Burwell – studio assistant
- Bart Elsmore – studio assistant
- Rob Farrell – studio assistant
- David Merrill – studio assistant
- Savvas Lossisidis – studio assistant
- Lee Phillips – studio assistant
- Chris Scard – studio assistant
- Dave Walters – studio assistant
- George Lambert – mastering at Tape To Tape (London, UK)
- Sharon Blynn – recording coordinator
- Green Ink – artwork, design, photography
- Hat Nguyen – U.S. cover design
- Stephen King and Ricochet – management

== Charts ==
Chart (1995)	Peak position
Switzerland (Hitparade)	41
UK R&B Albums (Official Charts)	11
US Top Contemporary Jazz Albums (Billboard)	2
