= 100° and Rising =

Studio album by Incognito
- Released: June 1995
- Studios: Abbey Road Studios and Trident 2 Studio (London, England)
- Genre: Jazz fusion
- Length: 68:46
- Label: Talkin' Loud
- Producers: Jean-Paul "Bluey" Maunick; Richard Bull

Incognito chronology
Tribes, Vibes + Scribes (1993)	100° and Rising (1995)	Beneath the Surface (1996)

100° and Rising is an album by the British acid jazz band Incognito, produced by band leader Jean-Paul "Bluey" Maunick and released in 1995 on Talkin' Loud Records. The album peaked at No. 11 on the UK Albums Chart and No. 2 on the UK R&B Albums Chart. In the United States, it reached No. 2 on the Billboard Top Contemporary Jazz Albums chart and No. 29 on the Top R&B/Hip-Hop Albums chart.

== Singles ==
"I Hear Your Name" reached No. 7 on the UK Hip Hop and R&B Singles Chart and No. 19 on the UK Dance Singles Chart. "Everyday" peaked at No. 23 on the UK Singles Chart and No. 3 on both the UK Hip Hop and R&B Singles and UK Dance Singles charts.

== Critical reception ==
Professional ratings
Review scores
Source	Rating
AllMusic	4/5 stars
NME	4/10
Rolling Stone	(favourable)

Stephen Thomas Erlewine of AllMusic hailed the album saying "On 100 Degrees and Rising, the pioneering acid house outfit, Incognito, turn in another first-rate record, featuring their trademark mixture of jazz, soul, and funk. There's not much to distinguish 100 Degrees from their previous handful of records, but the band is smooth, accomplished, and deep, finding new variations on their trademark sound." Richard Torres of Rolling Stone wrote "On Incognito's superlative fifth album, 100deg and Rising, Jean-Paul Bluey Maunick actually proves himself a worthy student of the old school..Although his LP may be overlong by an instrumental or two, Maunick is leading the old-school charge into the new millennium with his carefully built melodies, wary lyrics and sensual production..On 100deg and Rising, Incognito make more than sense, they make beauty, too."

== Track listing ==
All tracks are written by Jean-Paul "Bluey" Maunick.

No.	Title	Writer(s)	Length
1.	"Where Did We Go Wrong"	Maunick, Richard Bull	5:38
2.	"Good Love"	Maunick, Peter Hinds	6:00
3.	"One Hundred and Rising"		5:55
4.	"Roots (Back to a Way of Life)"		5:39
5.	"Everyday"	Maunick, Hinds	5:54
6.	"Too Far Gone"	Maunick, Graham Harvey	2:34
7.	"After the Fall"	Maunick, Bull	3:26
8.	"Spellbound and Speechless"		5:29
9.	"I Hear Your Name"	Maunick, Harvey	6:51
10.	"Barumba"		4:55
11.	"Millenium"	Maunick, Max Beesley	6:24
12.	"Time Has Come"	Maunick, Bull	3:58
13.	"Jacob's Ladder"	Maunick, Julian Crampton	6:03

== Personnel ==
Musicians

- Graham Harvey – acoustic piano (1, 8–11), Fender Rhodes (1, 3, 6–9, 13), synthesizers (5, 7, 8), Moog bass (6), synth bass (8)
- Peter Hinds – Fender Rhodes (2, 4, 5), acoustic piano (5), synthesizers (5, 8, 13), brass arrangements (5)
- Gary Sanctuary – clavinet (4), Mellotron (7), synthesizers (7)
- Jean-Paul "Bluey" Maunick – guitars (1–8, 10–13), drum programming (2, 5, 8), handclaps (8), bass programming (10), brass arrangements (10)
- Richard Bull – acoustic guitar (1), drum programming (1, 7), percussion programming (2, 5, 9), drums (5, 9, 12), synthesizer programming (12), percussion (12)
- Randy Hope-Taylor – bass (1, 4, 8)
- Julian Crampton – bass (2, 3, 5, 7, 9, 11–13)
- Max Beesley – percussion (1, 2, 4, 5, 7, 8, 10, 11, 13), drums (2–4, 8), handclaps (8), Fender Rhodes (11), vibraphone (11), brass arrangements (11)
- Richard Bailey – drums (10, 13)
- Simon Cotsworth – handclaps (8)
- Snowboy – percussion (9)
- Bud Beadle – alto saxophone (2–4), baritone saxophone (2, 4), flute (3)
- Ed Jones – soprano saxophone (2), tenor saxophone (2), brass arrangements (2), saxophones (11)
- Adrian Revell – tenor saxophone (5, 9, 12), flute (5), saxophones (13)
- Rowland Sutherland – bass flute (10), brass arrangements (10)
- Jason Yarde – soprano saxophone (10)
- Denys Baptiste – tenor saxophone (10)
- Fayyaz Virji – trombone (2–4, 11), brass arrangements (2, 4)
- Mark Nightingale – trombone (5)
- Richard Edwards – trombone (9, 12, 13)
- Kevin Robinson – trumpet (2–4), brass arrangements (2, 3), flugelhorn (3, 11), muted trumpet (11)
- Gerard Presencer – trumpet (5, 7, 9, 12), brass arrangements (5, 9, 12, 13), flugelhorn (7, 13), muted trumpet (13)
- Simon Hale – string arrangements and conductor

Vocalists

- Joy Malcolm – lead vocals (1, 3, 6, 8, 9, 12), backing vocals (1–6, 8, 9, 12), vocals (10)
- Pamela Y. Anderson – lead vocals (2, 4–6), backing vocals (2, 4–6, 8, 9)
- Barry Stewart – backing vocals (2, 4, 6, 8), lead vocals (6)
- Jean-Paul "Bluey" Maunick – backing vocals (3, 9), lead vocal outro (3), voice (7)
- Elisabeth Troy – backing vocals (5)
- Max Beesley – voice (7), vocal percussion (10)
- DJ Soul Slinger – Portuguese chatting (10)
- Claudia Rey – Portuguese talking (10)
- People of the Earth – voices (11)

=== Production ===
- Gilles Peterson – A&R direction
- Jean-Paul "Bluey" Maunick – producer
- Richard Bull – producer (1, 5, 7, 9, 12)
- Simon Cotsworth – recording, mixing
- John Gallen – string recording
- Robin Laybourne – assistant engineer
- Geoff Pesche – mastering at The Town House (London, UK)
- Fiona Grimshaw – artist development
- Sarah Vaughn – recording coordinator
- Sarah Nelson – recording coordinator
- Al Winter – recording coordinator
- Beverly Harris – US release coordinator
- Joan Pace – US release coordinator
- Mercury Art – design
- Uli Weber – photography
- David Cotsworth – studio photo snaps
- Stephen King and Ricochet – management

== Charts ==
Chart (1995)	Peak position
Austria	35
Germany (Official German Charts)	64
Netherlands (Album Top 100)	72
Sweden	42
Switzerland (Hitparade)	9
UK Albums (Official Charts)	11
UK R&B Albums (Official Charts)	2
US Billboard 200	149
US Top R&B/Hip-Hop Albums (Billboard)	29
US Top Contemporary Jazz Albums (Billboard)	2
