= Wild and Peaceful =

Wild and Peaceful may refer to:

- Wild and Peaceful (Kool & the Gang album) (1973)
- Wild and Peaceful (Teena Marie album) (1979)
- "Wild & Peaceful", a song by Incognito
