= Jazz Funk (album) =

Studio album by Incognito
- Released: April 1981
- Studio: Jam Studios, Free Range Studios and TW Music (London, UK)
- Genre: Jazz fusion
- Length: 52:00
- Label: Ensign
- Producer: Jean-Paul "Bluey" Maunick; Paul "Tubbs" Williams

Incognito chronology
Jazz Funk (1981)	Inside Life (1991)

Jazz Funk is the debut studio album by the British acid jazz band Incognito, produced by band leader Jean-Paul "Bluey" Maunick and released in 1981. The album peaked at No. 28 on the UK Albums Chart.

== Critical reception ==
Professional ratings
Review scores
Source	Rating
AllMusic	3/5 stars

AllMusic gave Jazz Funk a 3 out of 5 star rating.

== Track listing ==
No.	Title	Writer(s)	Length
1.	"Parisienne Girl"	Jean-Paul Maunick, Paul "Tubbs" Williams	5:45
2.	"Summer's Ended"	Maunick, Williams	5:05
3.	"Shine On"	Don Doobay, Maunick, Williams	5:03
4.	"Wake Up the City"	Geoff Dunn, Peter Hinds, Maunick, Williams	4:08
5.	"Interference"	Maunick, Williams	5:19
6.	"Incognito"	Maunick, Williams	4:55
7.	"Sunburn"	Doobay, Maunick, Williams	4:49
8.	"The Smile of a Child"	Maunick, Williams	4:07
9.	"Why Don't You Believe Me?"	Maunick, Williams	4:07
10.	"Chase the Clouds Away"	Doobay, Maunick, Williams	4:37
11.	"Walking on Wheels"	Dunn, Hinds, Maunick, Williams	4:54
