= Tribes, Vibes + Scribes =

Studio album by Incognito
- Released: June 1992
- Studio: Parkgate Studios (East Sussex, UK)
- Genre: Jazz fusion
- Length: 51:03
- Label: Talkin' Loud
- Producer: Jean-Paul "Bluey" Maunick; Richard Bull

Incognito chronology
Inside Life (1991)	Tribes, Vibes + Scribes (1992)	Positivity (1993)

Tribes, Vibes + Scribes is an album by the British acid jazz band Incognito, released in 1992 on Talkin' Loud Records. It was produced by band leader Jean-Paul "Bluey" Maunick.

The album peaked at No. 5 on the US Billboard Top Contemporary Jazz Albums chart.

== Singles ==
A cover of Stevie Wonder's "Don't You Worry 'bout a Thing" reached No. 19 on the UK Singles chart and No. 6 on the Dutch Single Top 100.

== Critical reception ==
Professional ratings
Review scores
Source	Rating
AllMusic	4/5 stars

Craig Lytle of AllMusic, in a 4 out of 5 star review, wrote "This England-based dance and funk, but mostly jazz, band brings nothing but energy to this project. The production is sleek, and the arrangements are precise. Maysa Leak reaches her higher notes without abandoning the fullness of her unwavering lower range."

== Track listing ==
No.	Title	Writer(s)	Length
1.	"Colibri"	Jean-Paul Maunick, Richard Bull	5:59
2.	"Change"	Maunick, Bull	5:05
3.	"River in My Dreams"	Maunick, Maysa Leak	1:08
4.	"Don't You Worry 'Bout a Thing"	Stevie Wonder	5:20
5.	"Magnetic Ocean"	Maunick, Bull, Patrick Clahar	5:18
6.	"I Love What You Do for Me"	Maunick, Bull	4:30
7.	"Closer to the Feeling"	Maunick, Bull, Fayyaz Virji	4:22
8.	"L' Arc en Ciel de Miles"	Maunick, Bull, Kevin Robinson	4:01
9.	"Need to Know"	Maunick, Bull	5:15
10.	"Pyramids"	Maunick, Bull, Graham Harvey	4:19
11.	"Tribal Vibes"	Maunick, Bull, Robinson	5:55

== Personnel ==
Incognito

- Maysa Leak – lead vocals, backing vocals
- Jean-Paul "Bluey" Maunick – keyboards, guitars, backing vocals
- Richard Bull – keyboards, guitars, bass programming, drums, percussion
- Graham Harvey – keyboards
- Peter Hinds – keyboards
- Randy Hope-Taylor – bass
- Andy Gangadeen – drums
- Thomas Dyani – percussion
- Patrick Clahar – saxophones, wind synth
- Fayyaz Virji –trombone
- Kevin Robinson – trumpet, flugelhorn

Guest musicians

- Rowland Sutherland – flutes
- Ivan Hussey – cello
- Sara Loewenthal – double bass
- Ellen Blair – violin
- Stephen Hussey – violin
- Yolisa Phahle – violin
- Bernita Turner – backing vocals (4)

== Production ==
- Gilles Peterson – A&R direction
- Jean-Paul Maunick – producer
- Richard Bull – producer
- Simon Cotsworth – recording
- Jeremy Allom – mixing
- Ian Gotts – recording coordinator
- Patrick Spinks – recording coordinator
- Swifty Typographics – design
- Ian Wright – front and back illustration
- Simon Fowler – photography
- Stephen King and Ricochet – management

== Charts ==
Chart (1992)	Peak position
Australian Albums (ARIA)	194
Austria	37
Germany (Official German Charts)	98
Netherlands (Album Top 100)	49
Switzerland (Hitparade)	20
US Top R&B Albums (Billboard)	74
US Top Contemporary Jazz Albums (Billboard)	5
UK Albums (Official Charts)	41
