= The Bays (band) =

- Genres: Electro; Drum and bass; Techno; House; Trance; Jungle; Dubstep; UK garage; Big beat; Dub; Hip hop; Breakbeat; Ambient
- Years active: 2002–2011; 2020–present
- Label: None
- Website: thebays.com

The Bays are an English group of musicians who only play live Improvised Electronic Music. They have never rehearsed nor recorded in a studio as they do not release music commercially and are independent of record labels. Their slogan is "Performance is the Product".

== Performances ==
The Bays gig regularly and are known for their live shows. Sets are improvised, with the band playing off the mood of the audience and the atmosphere. Performances vary from an ambient set to one that is predominantly drum and bass, typically including several genres melded into a continuous piece of music, similar to a DJ set. Electro, House, Techno, Hip-hop, Trance, Ambient, Drum and bass, Dub, UK garage and Breakbeat, are all styles mixed into their sets.

They have headlined The Big Chill Festival and the dance tent at the Glastonbury Festival and have played at events including the Sri Lankan WOMAD festival, the Hotaka Mountain Festival in Japan, Dour Festival and Pukkelpop festival in Belgium and the Skol Beats festival in Brazil. They appeared at the Glastonbury Festival in 2009 on The Glade stage with beatboxer Beardyman.

Another project saw The Bays performing their improvisations to Tom Tykwer's "Run Lola Run" film. The idea being that the original soundtrack is removed and The Bays improvise a new soundtrack in real time. They have performed this format most notably at Darling Harbour in Sydney (2009), Australia and at the Brighton Festival (2007). The most recent performance of Run Lola Run saw the current three piece line-up closing the Ilkley Film Festival in 2016.

== Line up ==
The current members of the band are Andy Gangadeen (drums, also of Chase and Status) Chris Taylor (bass), Jamie Odell (keys), and Simon Richmond (keys).

The Bays have largely operated as a collective with key personnel including: Chris Taylor (bass), Jamie Odell, Ski Oakenfull or Tom Szirtes (keyboards) and Simon Richmond (effects and samples). Previous members include Simon Smugg, Tom Middleton and Nick Cohen.

The Bays have performed with other artists including Herbie Hancock, Richard Barbieri, Matt White, Mark Pritchard, Bluey, Stamina MC, The Stereo MCs Ty, Hexstatic, and the Heritage Orchestra.

The Bays have done two British Council tours in Mexico (2003) and Germany (2004) to run music workshops with young musicians.
