= Raw Stylus =

Dance music outfit

Raw Stylus was a London-based dance music outfit whose core members were Jules Brookes, Ron Aslan, and Donna Gardier.

Originally, Raw Stylus released white label vinyl records into the London club scene in the early 1990s, and played live with an expanded band (featuring keyboard players Ski Oakenfull and Rickardo Reid, drummer Andrew Missingham, bass player Yolanda Charles, guitarist Nemo Jones and backing vocalists Sharon Shannon and Lucy Vandi). "Pushing Against the Flow" was a popular underground song, and later became the title track of their album. Early singles included "Bright Lights, Big City", "Pushing Against the Flow", "Many Ways (Mo' Wax)" and "Use Me (Acid Jazz)".

In 1995, they released the single, "Believe in Me", which reached number 1 on the US Hot Dance Club Play chart. It was a minor success in the United Kingdom reaching number 66 on the UK Singles Chart in October 1996.

After original singer Deborah French left, Donna Gardier replaced her and they recorded an album. Their sole album was recorded Stateside, with Steely Dan record producer Gary Katz, and an array of musicians including cameos from Donald Fagen and Bernard Purdie. The group toured as a nine-piece until they split at the end of 1999. Brookes went on to become managing director at the award winning pointblank Music School based in Hoxton, London.

== See also ==
- List of number-one dance hits (United States)
- List of artists who reached number one on the US Dance chart
