= Tony Momrelle =

British R&B and jazz singer

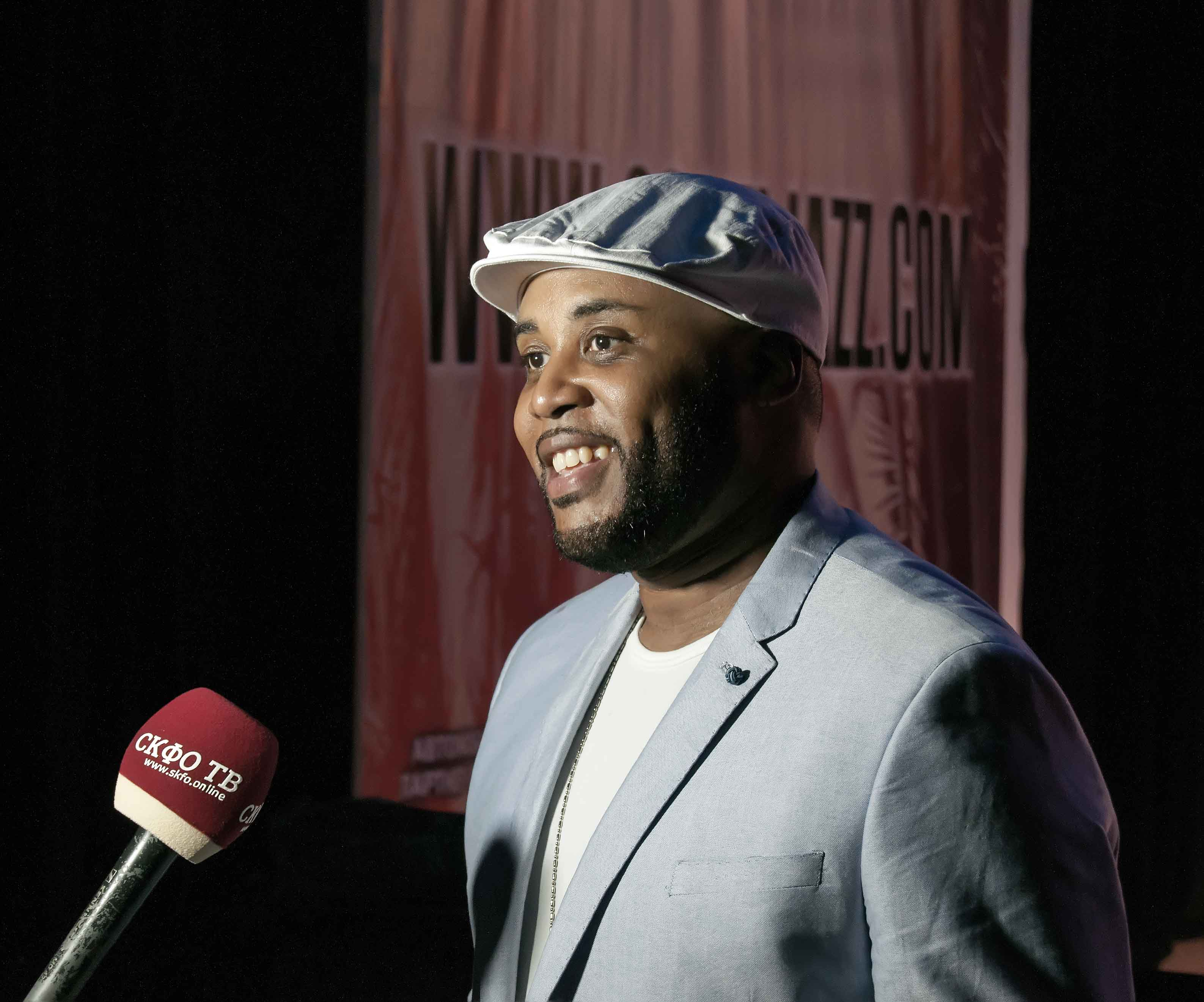
Tony Momrelle

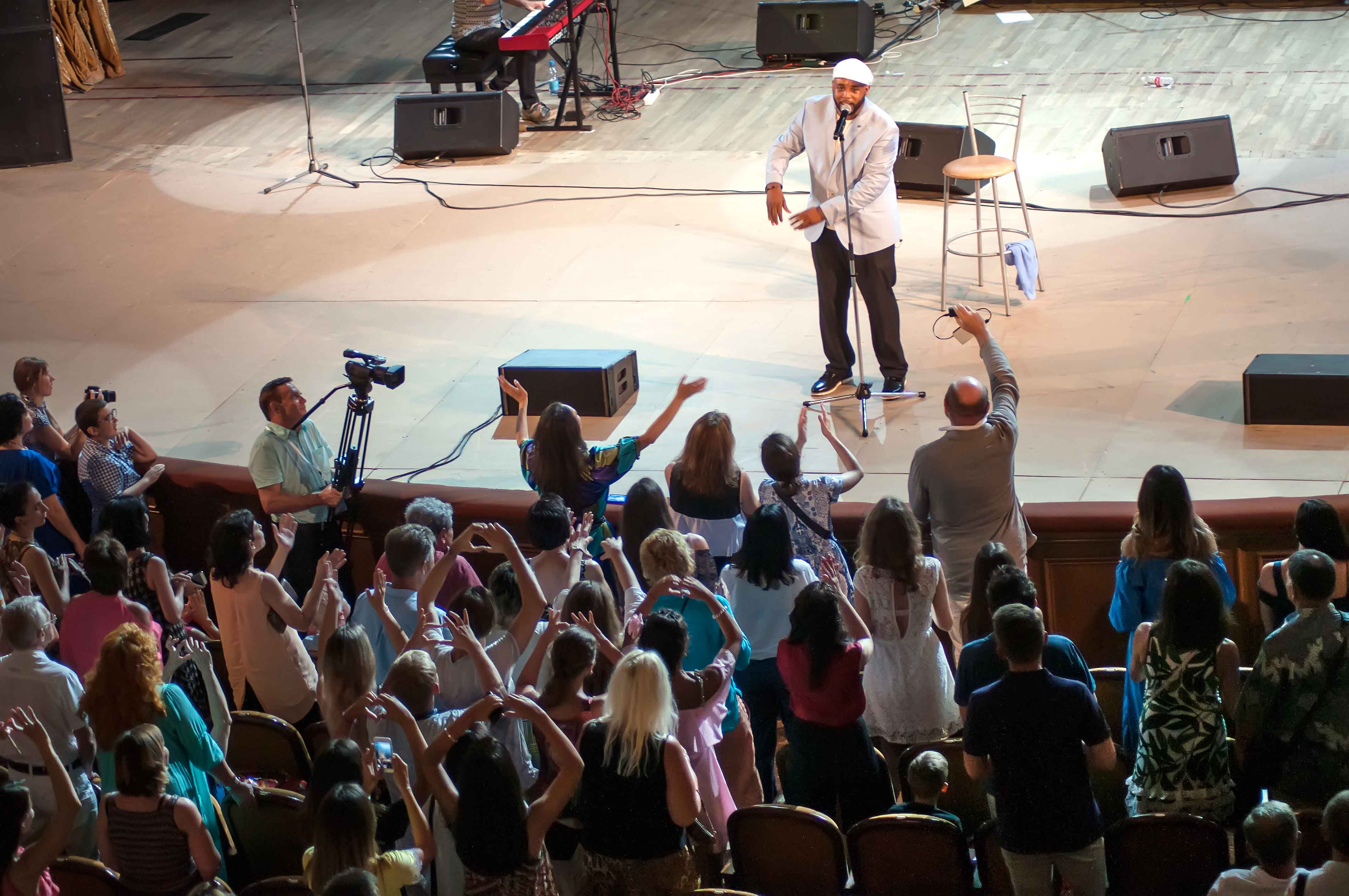
Tony Momrelle's concert at Sochi Jazz Festival in Sochi, Russia on 5 August 2017

Tony Momrelle (born Anthony Momrelle on 28 April 1973) is a British R&B and jazz singer and is one of the current lead vocalists of the band Incognito.

Before his stint in Incognito, Momrelle was already a solo recording artist who released two studio albums under his name. Also, he was once a member of gospel music group Seven. In a year, he toured with D'Sound. His success in touring impressed Incognito's frontman, Bluey Maunick, and he offered him the job as the vocalist of the acid-jazz outfit.

He made his Incognito full debut on the band's 2006 album, Bees + Things + Flowers, in which he contributed as a main vocalist. His album Keep Pushing was released in 2015, with Keep Pushing (Deluxe Edition) released in 2016.

In November 2017, he appeared alongside Seal, Lianne Carroll, Angelique Kidjo, Mica Paris, Miles Mosley, Mads Mattias, and fellow Incognito band member Vanessa Haynes for the opening gala of the 25th EFG London Jazz Festival, with Guy Barker's Orchestra.

In 2026, Visual Collaborative released an archival interview featuring Tony Momrelle. The publication formed part of the platform's ongoing effort to make previously unreleased long-form conversations from its archives publicly available.

== Selected appearances ==
- Sade – Lovers Live (2002) – background vocals
- Incognito – Eleven (2005) – main vocals on "I'll Get By"
- Incognito – Bees + Things + Flowers (2006)
- Reel People – Seven Ways to Wonder (2007) – main vocals on "Amazing", "It Will Be" and "Love Is Where You Are"
- Incognito – Tales from the Beach (2008)
- Sade – Soldier of Love (2010) – background vocals
- Incognito – Transatlantic RPM (2010)
