= Ski Oakenfull =

English music producer and educator

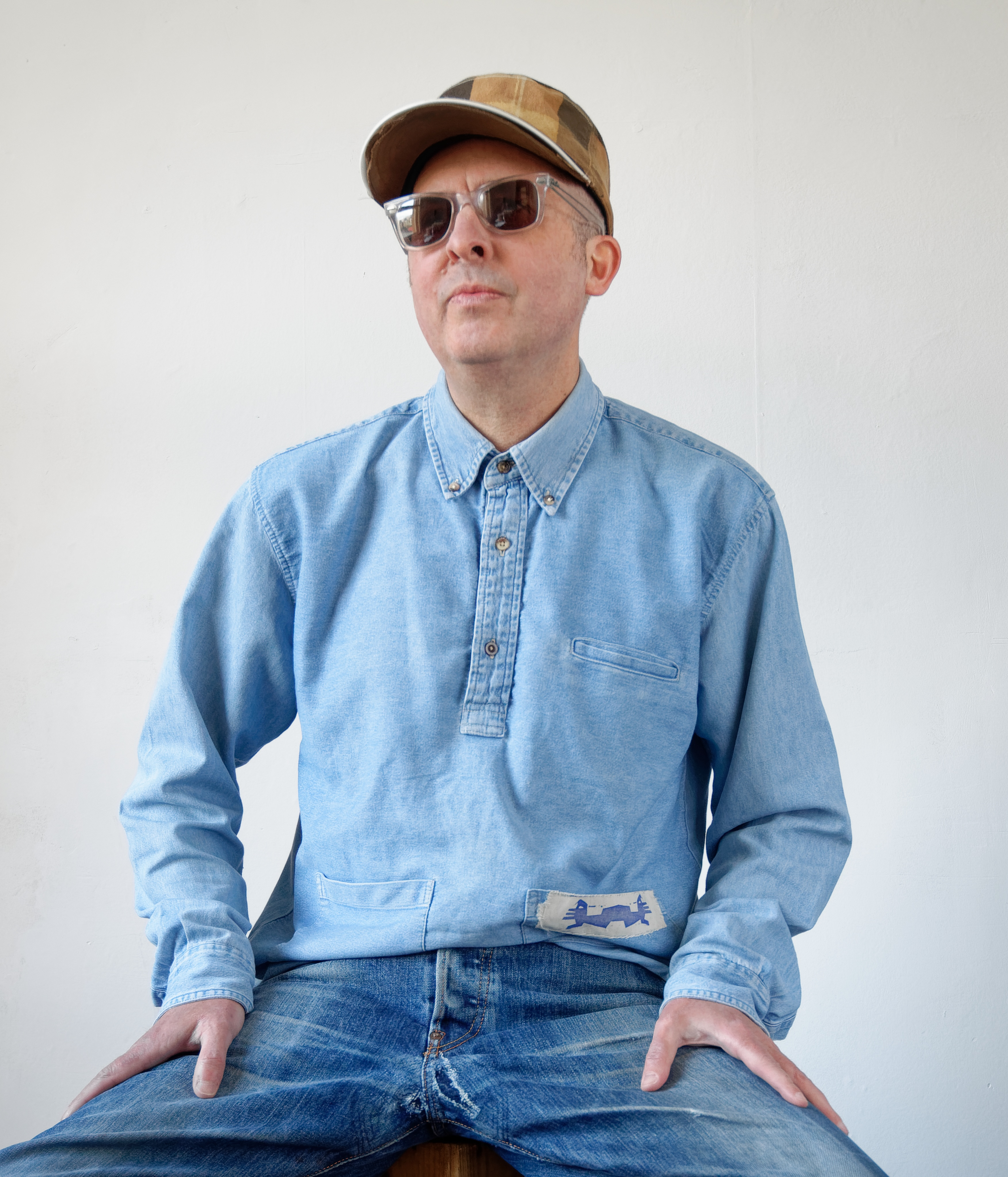
- Ski Oakenfull by Dobie (musician) in 2024

Background information
- Born: Dominic Oakenfull
- Origin: Sevenoaks, Kent, United Kingdom
- Genres: house; electronica; ambient; acid jazz
- Occupations: Music producer, keyboard player, educator
- Years active: 1990-present
- Labels: Primaudial Records; Columbia; Barely Breaking Even
- Website: www.skioakenfull.com

Dominic "Ski" Oakenfull (best known as Ski Oakenfull) is an English music producer, remixer, keyboard player, and educator. His nickname "Ski" was given by his bandmates in The K-Creative who named him after the dance music artist Adamski. His solo work is mainly house music and nu jazz, he was closely connected to UK the acid jazz movement, and has played with musicians from a wide range of genres including pop, Afrobeat, trip hop and jazz-funk.

== Career ==
=== Collaborations ===
Ski Oakenfull was a member of The K-Creative, who signed to Gilles Peterson's record label Talkin' Loud in 1991, and their single Feed The Feeling / Three Times A Maybe reached #58 in the UK Singles Charts in 1992. After the group disbanded, Oakenfull was a member of Raw Stylus, and then played keyboards with Galliano until 1997, and again on their 2024 album Halfway Somewhere. He has also performed with Incognito, Kylie Minogue, The Bays, and Milton Jackson.

=== Solo work ===
Oakenfull released his debut album Life Changes in 2000. Muzik rated it 4/5 and praised its mix of house, disco, soul and jazz-funk music styles. All Music rated it 3/5, and described it as "bringing back to life one of club/dance's most trendy circuits dating back to the early '90s." The album featured single Where Did The Love Go?, and Fifths, with the latter becoming the most played unplaylisted track on MTV Europe at the time. He also produces and releases music under the alias Ayota, a project that explores ambient, downtempo, and Japanese-influenced electronic soundscapes, blended with field recordings and vocals. The project's debut album, Helicopter Cuts, was released in 2007 on Third Ear Recordings in Japan where it became the Tower Records ambient album of the year. He has continued releasing music as both Ayota and Ski Oakenfull on his Primaudial label through into the 2020s.

=== Education work ===
In 2012 Oakenfull began teaching at pointblank Music School, and later became a Certified Trainer of music production software Ableton Live. He is now Head of Education and Curriculum at the school, where he oversees the design and management of its music degree programmes. Oakenfull is also widely recognised for his in-depth breakdowns of iconic tracks known as 'deconstructions' which he often presents live at festivals and conferences such as IMS, Sonar+, ADE, and AVA.

=== Record label ===
Oakenfull is also label manager and owner of Primaudial Records, an independent label he founded in the early 2000s to release his own material and selected projects by other artists. The label has served as a platform for Oakenfull's creative output, ranging from house to ambient and jazz.

== Select discography ==
=== Solo albums ===
Date	Title	Record label
2000	Life Changes	Columbia France
2005	Rising Son	Barely Breaking Even / Pony Canyon
2021	Short Circuits	Primaudial Records

=== Solo singles, EPs and compilation tracks ===
Date	Title	From album	Record label
1994	Ain't Gonna Justify feat. Chezeré	-	Black on Black
1994	Realise Your True Potential (with Ife Piankhi)	One Hell Of A Storm (Versemongers Meet Soundcreators)	Tongue & Groove
1997	Montreux à Marseille	Sun Sun: Ceci N'Est Pas Une Compilation	Columbia
1998	Tress-Cun-Deo-La feat. Valerie Etienne	Sun Sun: Ceci N'Est Pas Une Compilation	Columbia
2000	Fifths (Including Jazzanova remix)	Life Changes	Columbia / INCtraxx
2000	Undercover	Life Changes	Columbia
2001	Where Did The Love Go? feat. Marc Anthony	Life Changes	Columbia
2003	Slo Fix	Italian Style Volume 2	Jalapeno
2007	Heavenly feat. Chi Turner (Yam Who? Mix)	12 Inches of Pleasure Part II	Barely Breaking Even
2007	New Orleans Under Attack EP	-	Primaudial Records
2007	Illuminations EP	-	Primaudial Records
2007	Live at Maida Vale EP	-	Primaudial Records
2007	Winter feat. Valerie Etienne	Winterhouse compilation	Starbucks
2008	The Look of Love feat. Valerie Etienne	The Look of Love compilation	Starbucks
2009	Love Meeting Love feat. Valerie Etienne	-	Primaudial Records
2009	Love Meeting Love feat. Valerie Etienne (Remixes)	-	Primaudial Records
2010	Thousand Knives EP	-	Primaudial Records
2020	Terms and Conditions	Digging the KPM Vaults	KPM
2025	Fujicolour EP	-	Primaudial Records

== Charts ==
Date	Release	Chart	Peak position
2001	Where Did The Love Go?	Club Chart Top 40 (UK)	18
2005	So Beautiful feat. Chi Turner	Tokio Hot 100 (Japan)	87
