= Dome Records =

Dome Records is a British record label which has existed since 1992, specialising in soul and contemporary R&B music.

== History ==
The label, also called Dôme Records, was formed in 1992 and has consistently been voted as the United Kingdom's leading black music label by readers of Blues & Soul magazine. Artists signed by Dome Records include Beverley Knight, Hil St Soul, Dennis Taylor, Eric Roberson, Tortured Soul, Incognito, Brenda Russell, Rahsaan Patterson, Donnie, Angela Johnson, Martha Redbone, Carleen Anderson, George Duke, Full Flava, and Don-E. The label also issued Lulu's Independence album in 1993, with a title track that became particularly popular in Europe. "I'm Back for More", a duet on the album with Lulu and Bobby Womack, became the label's first chart success. Dome Records is also the British label for the late American singer-songwriter Andrew Gold.

The label was started by Peter Robinson and was initially associated with EMI Records. The label became fully independent in 1995. Prior to starting Dome Records, Robinson had been an A&R person for the RCA, Chrysalis, and CBS labels.

The label's orientation towards urban black music commenced with the release of Beverley Knight's album, The B-Funk, in 1994. The label was noted for developing longstanding relationships with certain artists, such as Full Flava. Initially focusing on British acts, the label accepted offers to produce, develop, or distribute a number of American acts, such as Eric Roberson and Rahsaan Patterson. The latter two are American artists previously signed to major labels, who now release their music independently in the United States and through Dome Records in the United Kingdom.
