= Maysa Leak =

American jazz singer (born 1966)

- Leak in 2026

Background information
- Born: August 16, 1966 (age 60); Baltimore, Maryland, U.S.
- Genres: Jazz; R&B; soul
- Occupations: Singer-songwriter; record producer
- Years active: 1991–present
- Labels: Blue Note; Dome; Warlock; N-Coded; Expansion; Shanachie
- Website: www.maysa.com

Maysa Leak (born August 16, 1966) is an American jazz singer better known by her mononym Maysa. She is well known by fans of smooth jazz both for her solo work and her work with the British band Incognito.

== Early life and career ==
Leak attended Milford Mill High School in western Baltimore County. After receiving her degree from Morgan State University, Maysa headed to Southern California to perform with Stevie Wonder’s female backup group Wonderlove. While with Wonder, Maysa was a vocalist on the Jungle Fever soundtrack.

It was during an over-the-telephone audition in the early 1990s that Maysa became a member of the British jazz/funk/R&B band Incognito and, in 1992, she relocated to London and recorded Tribes, Vibes & Scribes, featuring the hit single "Don't You Worry 'Bout A Thing". Maysa recorded her self-titled debut in 1995. Maysa has also collaborated with jazz performers such as Gerald Veasley, Rick Braun, Will Downing, Jason Miles' Soul Summit, Rhythm Logic, Jonathan Butler, and Pieces of a Dream.

== Personal life ==
Maysa continues to live in Baltimore. She has a son named Jazz.

== Discography ==
=== Albums ===
Year	Album details	US Chart positions					Note
Year	Album details	R&B/ Hip-Hop	Jazz	Con. Jazz	Heat	Indie	Note
1995	Maysa: Released: August 29, 1995; Label: Blue Thumb / GRP	64	—	—	—	—	
2000	All My Life: Released: March 21, 2000; Label: Rice / N-Coded / Warlock	88	11	—	—	—	
2002	Out of the Blue: Released: March 15, 2002; Label: N-Coded / Warlock	—	10	—	—	—	
2004	Smooth Sailing: Released: July 21, 2004; Label: N-Coded / Warlock	61	15	9	—	—	
2006	Sweet Classic Soul: Released: February 21, 2006; Label: Shanachie	48	—	—	47	—	
2007	Feel the Fire: Released: May 22, 2007; Label: Shanachie	30	—	—	18	43	
2008	Metamorphosis: Released: October 14, 2008; Label: Shanachie	13	3	1	4	28	
2010	A Woman in Love: Released: January 26, 2010; Label: Shanachie	70	7	1	22	—	
2011	The Very Best of Maysa: Released: March 29, 2011; Label: N-Coded	—	43	—	—	—	
2011	Motions of Love: Released: November 8, 2011; Label: Shanachie	41	5	1	9	—	
2013	Blue Velvet Soul: Released: June 18, 2013; Label: Shanachie	32	5	3	11	50	R&B #13
2014	A Very Maysa Christmas: Released: October 27, 2014; Label: Shanachie	—	20	7	—	—	
2015	Back 2 Love: Released: May 26, 2015; Label: Shanachie	21	4	2	6	22	R&B #9
2017	Love is a Battlefield: Released: May 26, 2017; Label: Shanachie	—	3	1	5	20	
2023	Music for Your Soul: Released: March 31, 2023; Label: Blue Velvet Soul Records						
"—" denotes a release that did not chart.
