= Jean-Paul Maunick =

Mauritian-born British musician (born 1957)

Jean-Paul Maunick MBE
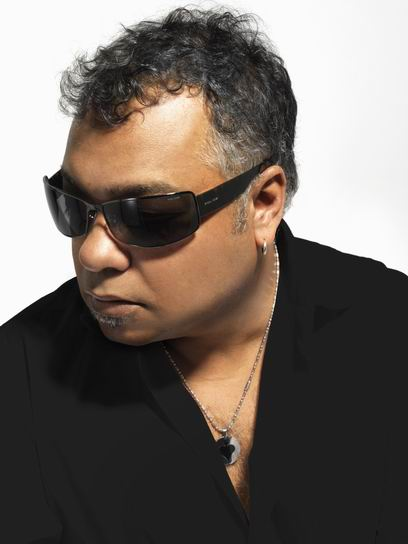

Background information
- Born: 19 February 1957 (age 69); Port-Louis, Mauritius
- Genre: Acid jazz
- Occupations: Musician, singer, songwriter, record producer
- Instruments: Vocals, guitar
- Label: Shanachie Records
- Member of: Incognito

Jean-Paul Edouard Maunick MBE (born 19 February 1957, Mauritius), known by his stage name Bluey is a British guitarist, bandleader, composer and record producer. He has led the British acid jazz band Incognito since its formation in 1979. With Incognito, he has released fifteen studio albums as well as a number of live albums, remix albums and compilation albums. Prior to forming Incognito, Bluey was an original member of the group Light of the World.

His record production credits include artists such as Paul Weller, George Benson, Maxi Priest and Terry Callier; he has also collaborated with Stevie Wonder.

Maunick formed STR4TA with Gilles Peterson and released the album Aspects on Peterson’s Brownswood Recordings label in March 2021.

== Solo career ==
He released his solo debut album Leap of Faith in March 2013. Neil Kelly of PopMatters said of the album, "An undoubtedly listenable creation, Bluey has blended the club-infused soul-jazz sounds that made him famous with the sensibility of an elder statesman, which he is."

== Personal life ==
He is the son of the Mauritian poet Edouard Maunick and Armande Mallet. He was born in Mauritius, and moved to the United Kingdom when he was nine years old. Bluey was diagnosed with Parkinson's disease in 2023.

== Discography ==
=== Studio albums ===
Year	Title	Label	Notes
2009	First Protocol	Dome CD	with Tony Remy
2013	Leap of Faith	Shanachie	
2015	Life Between the Notes	Shanachie	
2020	Tinted Sky	Shanachie	
2026	Skint	Splash Blue	

=== EP albums ===
Year	Title	Label	Notes
2017	Rhodes to Fovever	Splash Music Productions	

=== Citrus Sun albums ===
Year	Title	Label	Notes
2001	Another Time Another Space	Heads Up	
2014	People of Tomorrow	Dome CD / Bluey Music	
2018	Ride Like the Wind	Dome CD / Bluey Music	
2020	Expansions and Visions	Dome CD / Bluey Music	
2023	Anaconga	Dome CD	

=== Incognito albums ===
See Incognito discography
