= Incognito (band) =

British acid jazz band

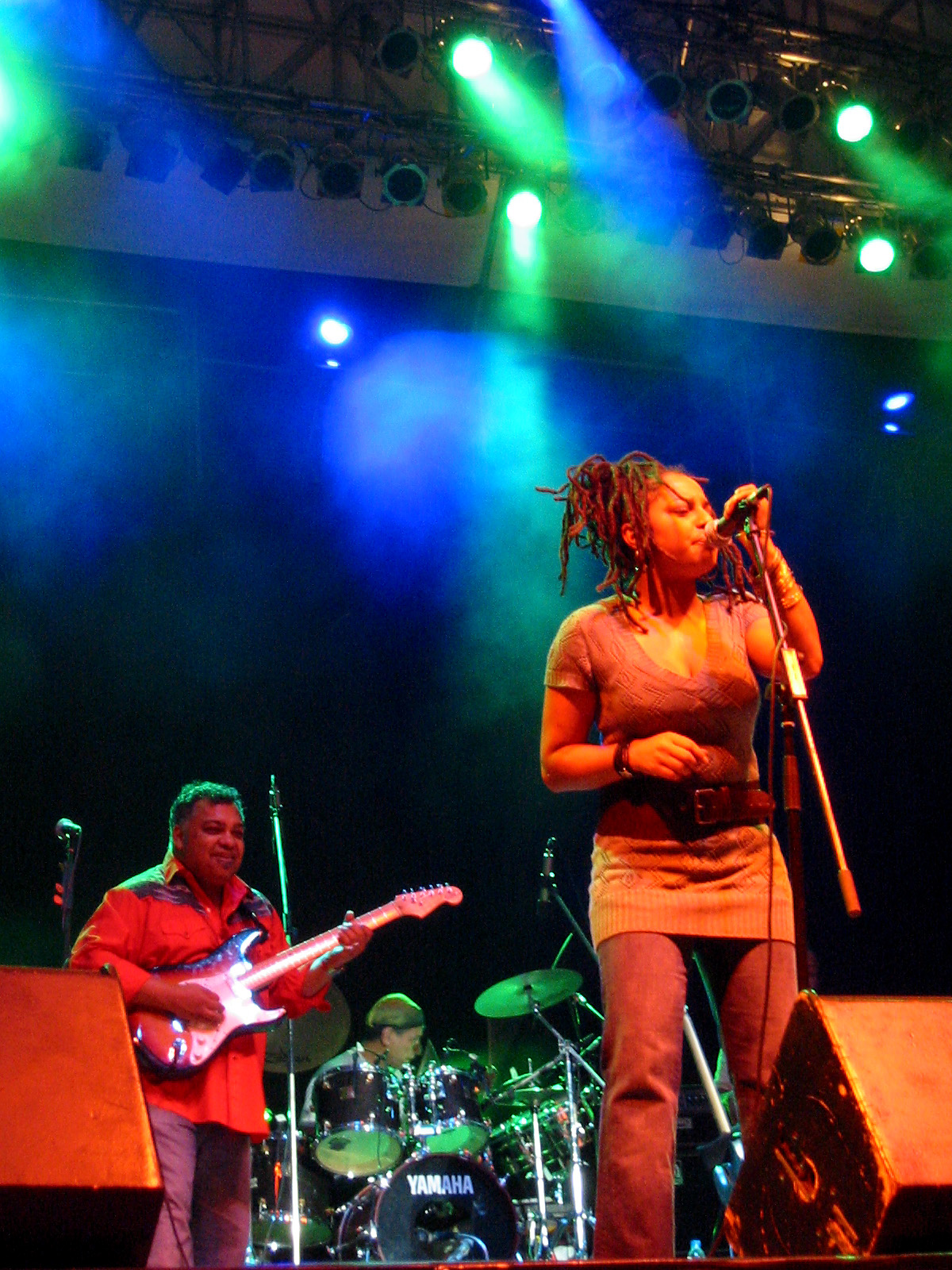
- Incognito in Bangkok in 2005

Background information
- Origin: London, England
- Genres: Acid jazz, house, soul
- Years active: 1979–present
- Labels: P-Vine, Splash Blue, Dôme, Edel, Shanachie, Heads Up Int', Handcuts, Pony Canyon, Narada, Universal, Verve, Talkin' Loud, Mercury, Ensign
- Members: Jean-Paul 'Bluey' Maunick; Chicco Allotta; Vanessa Haynes; Mo Brandis; Natalie Williams; Francis Hylton; Francesco Mendolia; João Caetano; Sid Gauld; Jamie Anderson; Trevor Mires; Maysa Leak; Tony Momrelle; Imaani Saleem; Charlie Allen; Katie Leone; Natalie Duncan
- Past members: Chris Botti; Jocelyn Brown; Joy Rose; Pete Ray Biggin; Nick Doobay; Carleen Anderson; Pam Anderson; Graham Harvey; Ski Oakenfull; Julian Crampton; Richard Bailey; Christopher Ballin; Marc Anthoni; Liam Spencer; Xavier Barnett; Bud Beadle; Kelli Sae; Karen Bernod; Max Beesley; Richard Bull; Matt Cooper; Simon Cotsworth; Sarah Brown; Ray Carless; Patrick Clahar; Matt Coleman; Chris DeMargary; Thomas Dyani-Akuru; Gail Evans; Adrian Fry; Andy Gangadeen; Gavin Harrison; Peter Hinds; Randy Hope-Taylor; Ed Jones; Joy Malcolm; Noel McKoy; Linda Muriel; Quinton Caruthers; Kevin Robinson; Winston Rollins; Gary Sanctuary; Snowboy; Karl Vandenbossche; Fayyaz Virji; Tyrone Henry; Tony Remy; Andy Ross; Nichol Thomson; Francisco Sales
- Website: www.incognito.london

Incognito is a British acid jazz band based in London. Their debut album, Jazz Funk, was released in 1981.

Jean-Paul 'Bluey' Maunick is the band's frontman, singer, guitarist, composer, and record producer. The band has now included Linda Muriel, Jocelyn Brown, Maysa Leak, Tony Momrelle, Imaani Saleem, Vanessa Haynes, Mo Brandis, Natalie Williams, Carleen Anderson, Pamela "PY" Anderson, Kelli Sae, and Joy Malcolm.

== History ==
Incognito was founded by Paul "Tubbs" Williams & Jean-Paul "Bluey" Maunick in 1979, as an offshoot from Light of the World. Light of the World was a substantially sized group and following various changes to the lineup, the founding members Breeze McKrieth, Kenny Wellington & David Baptiste – inspired by US funk bands like Funkadelic forming offshoot bands such as Parliament – formed Beggar & Co. Bluey & Tubbs went on to form a band, dubbed "Incognito". However, there has seen a re-connection over the years in "Light of the World" with all of former members, along their other committed work.

Incognito has had intermittent success in the UK Singles Chart, with their breakthrough 1991 hit a cover version of the Ronnie Laws' song "Always There", featuring Jocelyn Brown, which made No. 6 in the United Kingdom. The group's 1992 rendition, "Don't You Worry 'bout a Thing" saw similar success, reaching No. 19 in the United Kingdom. They have also been a favourite of many remixers, including Masters at Work, David Morales, Roger Sanchez and Jazzanova, and have released several albums composing almost entirely of remixes.

In 1994, Incognito appeared on the Red Hot Organization's compilation album, Stolen Moments: Red Hot + Cool. The album, meant to raise awareness and funds in support of the AIDS epidemic in relation to the African-American community, was heralded as 'Album of the Year' by Time magazine. In 1996, the band contributed "Water to Drink" to the AIDS-benefitted album Red Hot + Rio, also produced by the Red Hot Organization.

Their song "Need to Know" serves the theme music for progressive radio/TV news programme Democracy Now!

In 2021, the band reissued a celebratory, 40th anniversary, 106-track retrospective of their debut album, Jazz Funk. The British funk pioneers have released a music video for the track "You Are in My System." The deluxe reissue features a 52-page booklet with liner notes written by Charles Waring and a selection of the band's archival photos.

In October 2022, the band was the first group to be honoured as part of Universal Music Recording's "Black Story" series which honours Black British artists as part of the UK's Black History Month.

== Gallery ==
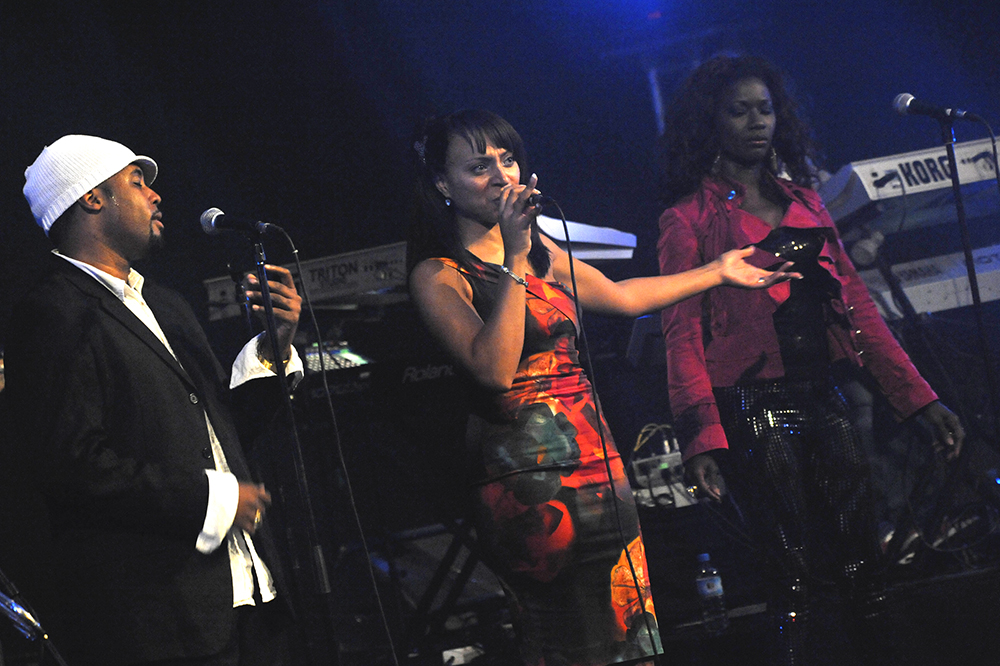
At Jazz Jamboree 2010 in Warsaw, Poland

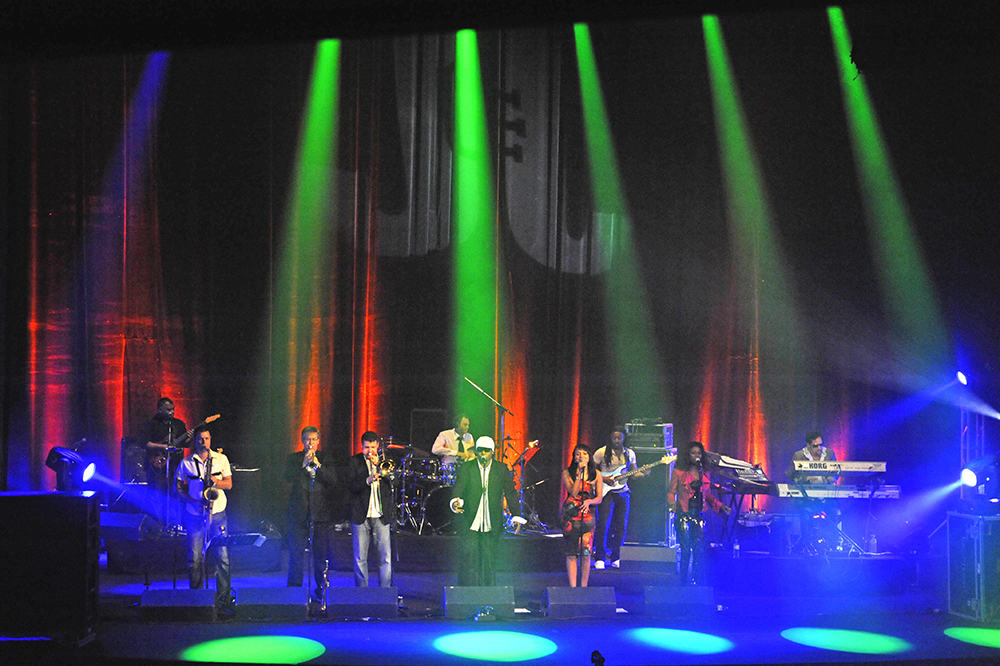
At Jazz Jamboree 2010 in Warsaw, Poland

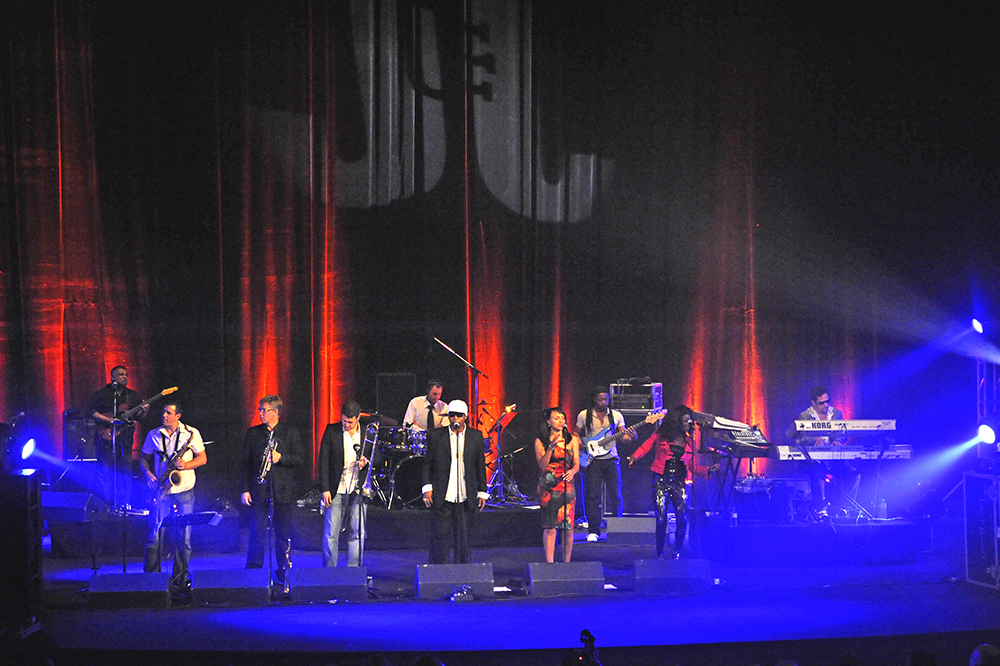
At Jazz Jamboree 2010 in Warsaw, Poland

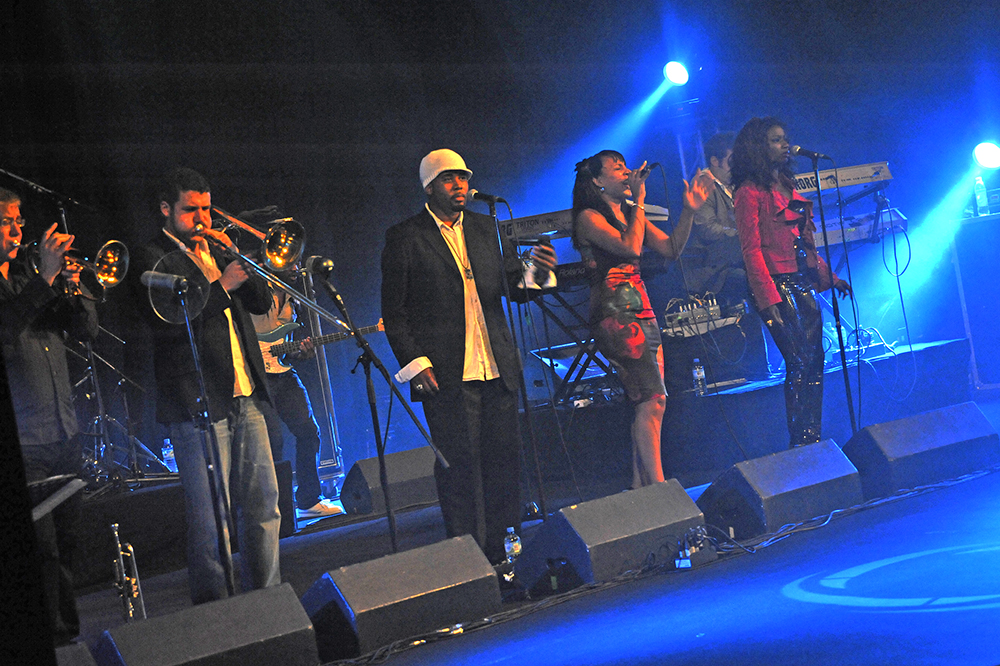
At Jazz Jamboree 2010 in Warsaw, Poland

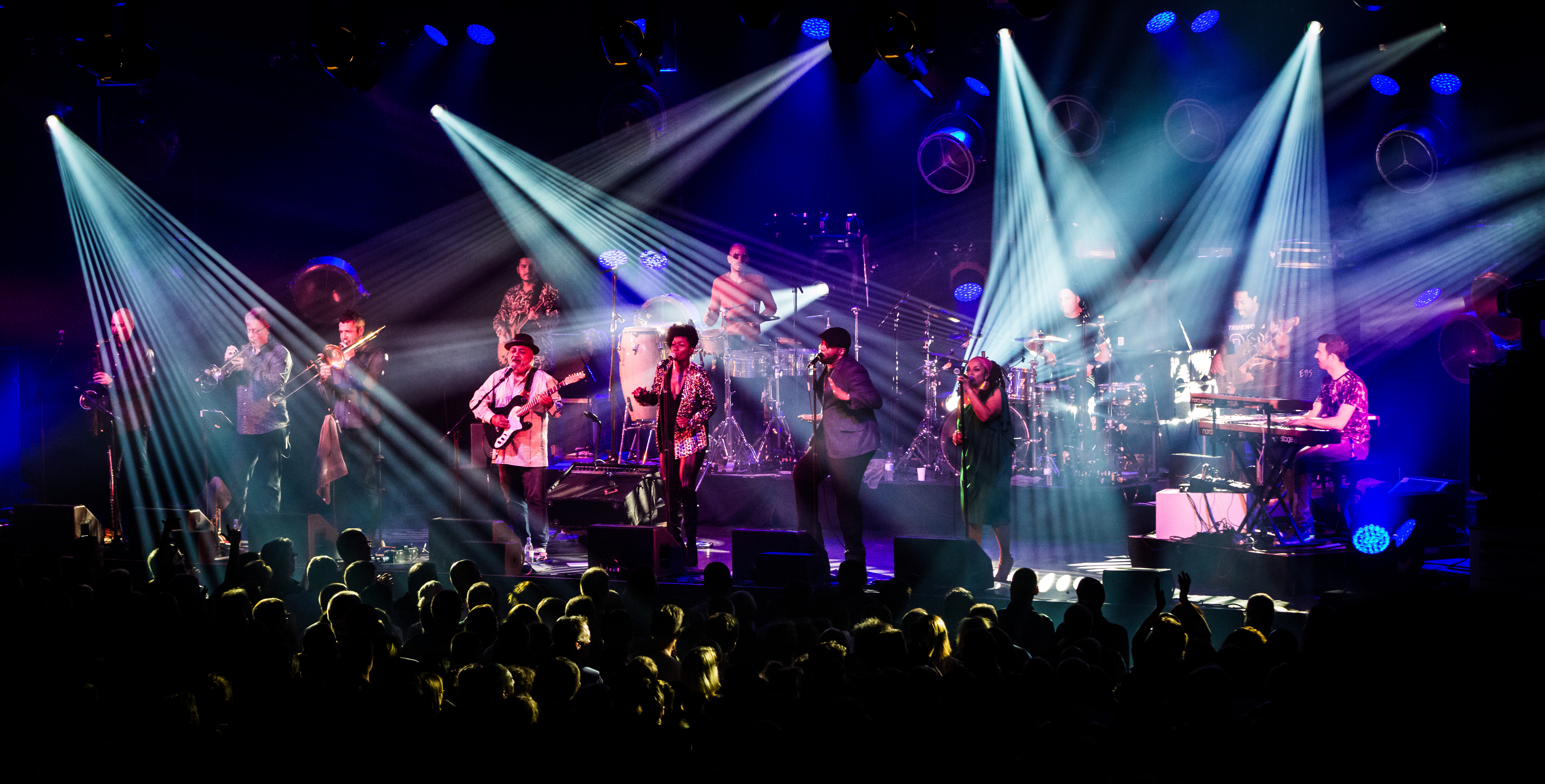
Incognito live at Leverkusener Jazztage (Germany) in November 2016
