= Lead videography =

Lead video discography
- Live albums: 19
- Video albums: 7
- Music videos: 61
- Shows/Films: 8

The Japanese group Lead has released over forty music videos since their debut in 2002. They debuted as a hip-hop group with the music video "Manatsu no Magic" on July 31, 2002. In other visual media, the group has been a part of several films and television shows. In 2003, all four members (Hiroki Nakadoi, Shinya Tanuichi, Keita Furuya, Akira Kagimoto) appeared in the film Boutaoshi!, with Shinya taking on the lead role of Tsuguo Takayama. All four members also appeared in the 2004 film Kamachi. Along with performing the theme song "Get Wild Life", Shinya took on the role of the title character and Hiroki was featured as the troubled teen Shun Iijima. In 2014, Shinya took the role of Tsuyoshi Kakinoki for the movie Oretachi no Ashita.

The release of Lead's debut album Life On Da Beat (2003) was preceded by the music videos for its singles "Manatsu no Magic", "Show me the way" and "Fly Away". Due to the success of both "Manatsu no Magic" and "Show me the way", Lead was able to secure the spot for the Best Newcomer Award during the 44th Japan Record Awards.

== List of music videos ==
=== 2000s ===
| Title | Year | Director(s) | Ref(s) |
|---|---|---|---|
| "Manatsu no Magic" | 2002 | | |
| "Show me the way" | 2002 | | |
| "Fly Away" | 2003 | | |
| "Funky Days!" | 2003 | | |
| "Get Wild Life" | 2003 | | |
| "Night Deluxe" | 2004 | | |
| "Tenohira wo Taiyou ni" | 2004 | | |
| "Atarashii Kisetsu e" | 2005 | | |
| "Baby Running Wild" | 2005 | | |
| "Virgin Blue" | 2006 | | |
| "Summer Madness" | 2006 | | |
| "Drive Alive" | 2007 | | |
| "Umi" | 2007 | | |
| "Stand Up!" | 2008 | | |
| "Sunnyday" | 2008 | | |
| "GiraGira Romantic" | 2009 | | |

=== 2010s ===
| Title | Year | Director(s) | Ref(s) |
|---|---|---|---|
| "Speed Star" | 2010 | | |
| "Hurricane" | 2011 | | |
| "Wanna Be With You" | 2012 | | |
| "Stand and Fight" | 2012 | | |
| "Still" | 2012 | | |
| "Upturn" | 2013 | | |
| "Upturn" -Dance Focused ver.- | 2015 | | |
| "Green Days" | 2013 | | |
| "Sakura" | 2014 | | |
| "Sakura" -Dance Ver.- | 2014 | | |
| "Omoide Breaker" | 2014 | | |
| "Omoide Breaker" -Dance Ver.- | 2014 | | |
| "My One" | 2015 | | |
| "Green Days" -Shinya Tanuichi Solo Focused ver.- | 2015 | | |
| "Green Days" -Keita Furuya Solo Focused ver.- | 2015 | | |
| "Green Days" -Akira Kagimoto Solo Focused ver.- | 2015 | | |
| "My One" -Dance Ver.- | 2015 | | |
| "Yakusoku" | 2015 | Seiji Kitahara | |
| "Yakusoku" -Dance Ver.- | 2015 | Seiji Kitahara | |
| "Zoom Up" | 2016 | Seiji Kitahara | |
| "Zoom Up" -Dance Ver.- | 2016 | Seiji Kitahara | |
| "Tokyo Fever" | 2017 | Jun Nakao | |
| "Tokyo Fever" -Dance Ver.- | 2017 | Jun Nakao | |
| "Beautiful Day" | 2017 | Yoshiharu Seri | |
| "Shampoo Bubble" -Image Movie in Hawaii- | 2017 | Seijiro Tashiro | |
| "Bumblebee" | 2018 | Hideaki Sunaga | |
| "Love or Love?" | 2018 | Tatsuya Murakami | |
| "Backpack" -Choreo Ver.- | 2018 | | |
| "Be the Naked" | 2019 | | |
| "Summer Vacation" | 2019 | | |

=== 2020s ===
| Title | Year | Director(s) | Ref(s) |
|---|---|---|---|
| "Chao Zhan Kai" (Japanese Ver.) feat. Lead | 2020 | Takuya Tada | |
| "Sunset Refrain" | 2020 | | |
| "Hide and Seek" | 2020 | | |
| "Tuxedo" | 2020 | Tomohiro Taniguchi | |
| "Tuxedo" (Choreography Ver.) | 2020 | | |
| "Kangoku Rokku" | 2020 | | |
| "Love or Love" (Choreography Ver.) | 2021 | | |
| "Bumblebee" (Choreography Ver.) | 2021 | | |
| "Summer Vacation" (Choreography Ver.) | 2021 | | |
| "Seasons" | 2021 | Akira Kagimoto | |
| "Sonic Boom" | 2021 | | |
| "Milk Tea" | 2021 | Lead • Moe Ochiai | |
| "The Christmas Song" feat. Da Pump and Lead | 2021 | | |
| "Te Quiero Mucho" (Choreography Ver.) | 2021 | Lead | |
| "Get Over" (Choreography Ver.) | 2022 | Akira Kagimoto | |
| "Michishirube" | 2022 | Akira Kagimoto | |
| "See Your Heart" | 2023 | | |
| "See Your Heart" (Shinya Version) | 2023 | | |
| "See Your Heart" (Keita Version) | 2023 | | |
| "See Your Heart" (Akira Version) | 2023 | | |
| "Don't Stay" | 2024 | Tada Takuya | |
| "Don't Stay" (Performance Video) | 2024 | Tada Takuya | |

== Albums ==
=== Live video albums ===
| Title | Album details |
|---|---|
| 1st Live Tour: Brand New Era | Released: November 17, 2004; Label: Flight Master; Formats: DVD, VHS |
| Lead Live Tour Upturn 2005 | Released: December 7, 2005; Label: Flight Master; Formats: DVD |
| Lead Upturn 2006 [4] | Released: December 5, 2006; Label: Flight Master; Formats: DVD |
| Lead Upturn 2007: B.W.R | Released: December 12, 2007; Label: Flight Master; Formats: DVD |
| Lead Upturn 2008: Feel the Vibes | Released: December 3, 2008; Label: Flight Master; Formats: DVD |
| Lead Upturn 2009: Summer Day & Night Fever | Released: December 9, 2009; Label: Flight Master; Formats: DVD |
| Lead Upturn 2010: I'll Be Around | Released: December 8, 2010; Label: Flight Master; Formats: DVD |
| Lead Upturn 2011: Sun x You | Released: December 21, 2011; Label: Pony Canyon; Formats: DVD |
| 10th Anniversary Tour Lead Upturn 2012: Now or Never | Released: December 26, 2012; Label: Pony Canyon; Formats: DVD |
| Lead Upturn 2013: Leap | Released: December 25, 2013; Label: Pony Canyon; Formats: DVD |
| Lead Upturn 2014: Attract | Released: December 24, 2014; Label: Pony Canyon; Formats: DVD |
| Lead Upturn 2015: Master Plan | Released: December 16, 2015; Label: Pony Canyon; Formats: DVD, Blu-ray |
| Lead Upturn 2016: The Showcase | Released: December 21, 2016; Label: Pony Canyon; Formats: DVD, Blu-ray |
| Lead 15th Anniversary Live Box | Released: December 20, 2017; Label: Pony Canyon; Formats: DVD, Blu-ray |
| Lead Upturn 2018: Milestone | Released: December 19, 2018; Label: Pony Canyon; Formats: DVD, Blu-ray |
| Lead Upturn 2019: Sync | Released: December 18, 2019; Label: Pony Canyon; Formats: DVD, Blu-ray |
| Lead Upturn 2020 Online Live: Trick or Lead | Released: January 20, 2021; Label: Pony Canyon; Formats: DVD, Blu-ray |
| Lead Upturn 2021 Online Live: Sonic Boom & GuiDance | Released: March 30, 2022; Label: Pony Canyon; Formats: DVD, Blu-ray |
| Lead 20th Anniversary Live: Kankin Dousai & Snow Magic | Released: March 22, 2023; Label: Pony Canyon; Formats: DVD, Blu-ray |
| Lead Upturn 2023: Jack in the Beats | Released: March 20, 2024; Label: Pony Canyon; Formats: DVD, Blu-ray |

=== Music video albums ===
| Title | Album details |
|---|---|
| Lead Movies 1 | Released: September 18, 2003; Label: Flight Master; Formats: DVD, VHS |
| Lead Movies 2 | Released: March 16, 2005; Label: Flight Master; Formats: DVD, VHS |
| Movies3 | Released: August 6, 2008; Label: Flight Master; Formats: DVD |
| Movies4 | Released: May 13, 2015; Label: Pony Canyon; Formats: DVD, Limited DVD |
| Movies 5 | Released: January 20, 2021; Label: Pony Canyon; Formats: DVD, Blu-ray |
| Movies Best | Released: September 27, 2023; Label: Pony Canyon; Formats: DVD, Blu-ray |

== Filmography ==
(For stage musicals, see Lead discography#Musicals)

| Title | Year | Roles | Ref. |
|---|---|---|---|
| Boutaoshi! | 2003 | *Shinya Tanuichi: Tsuguo Takayama; *Akira Kagimoto: Atsushi Tabuchi; *Keita Furuya: Suzumi Manabu; *Hiroki Nakadoi: Toru Akasaka | |
| Deep Love | 2004 | *Keita Furuya: Yoshiyuki | |
| Kamachi | 2004 | *Shinya Tanuichi: Kamachi Yamada; *Keita Furuya: Sayama Yuichi; *Akira Kagimoto: Himuro Kosuke; *Hiroki Nakadoi: Shun Iijma | |
| Syakkin Kanojo | 2007 | *Keita Furuya: Kouki Okamura | |
| Tenshi Ga Kureta Mono | 2007 | *Akira Kagimoto: Kakuyama Shou | |
| Syakkin Kanojo 2: 1000 Rhapsody | 2008 | *Hiroki Nakadoi: Taishi Kudo | |
| In Blue | 2009 | *Akira Kagimoto documentary | |
| Oretachi no Ashita | 2014 | *Shinya Tanuichi: Tsuyoshi Kakinoki | |

== Limited video release ==
=== Lead Dramabox ===
Lead Dramabox

Video by Lead
- Released: February 2011
- Recorded: 2007–2011
- Genre: Drama, soap opera, romance, comedy
- Label: Vision Factory; DVD

Lead chronology
| Lead Upturn 2010: I'll Be Around (2010) | Lead Dramabox (2011) | Lead Upturn 2011: Sun×You (2011) |

Lead Dramabox (stylized as Lead dramabox) is a collection of Japanese television dramas that featured one or more members of Lead. It was of limited release during the month of February 2011 and contained thirteen shows spanning across a three disc set. The collection was only released on Vision Factory's online shop.

==== Information ====
Lead dramabox is a special DVD collection released by Vision Factory with dramas featuring one or more members of the Japanese hip-hop group Lead (Hiroki Nakadoi, Shinya Tanuichi, Keita Furuya, Akira Kagimoto). It was of limited release and buyers could only purchase it through Vision Factory's online shop.

Spanning across three discs, the collection held thirteen dramas released through Open Cast and Vision Factory. Disc one held the dramas Syakkin Kanojo, Syakkin Kanojo 2 1000 Rhapsody, Shitamachi Detective Story -Find Maria!- and Shitamachi Detective Story 2.

Disc two featured the dramas Flowers ~Junketsu no Yuri~, Senko Hanabi, Kanojo to Boku to Toshokan de, Kokuhaku Sunzentsu!, Oretachi no Relation and Yakusoku no Cafe. Disc three held the three dramas Natsu wa Owaranai, Last Love and Game.

==== Track listing ====
DVD1
| No. | Title | Length |
|---|---|---|
| 1. | "Syakkin Kanojo" (※Keita Furuya) (借金カノジョ / Loaning Girlfriend) |
| 2. | "Syakkin Kanojo 2: 1000 Rhapsody" (※Hiroki Nakadoi) (借金彼女2 1000のラプソディ / Loaning Girlfriend 2 1000 Rhapsodies) |
| 3. | "Shitamachi Detective Story -Find Maria!-" (※Shinya Tanuichi, Akira Kagimoto) (下町探偵物語 -マリアを探せ!- / Shitamachi Tantei Monogatari -Maria o sagase!-) |
| 4. | "Shitamachi Detective Story 2" (※Shinya, Akira) (下町探偵物語2) |

DVD2
| No. | Title | Length |
|---|---|---|
| 1. | "Flowers ~Junketsu no Yuri~" (※Keita, Akira) (FLOWERS ～純潔のユリ～ / Purity of Yuri) |
| 2. | "Senko Hanabi" (※Shinya, Akira) (線香花火) |
| 3. | "Kanojo to Boku to Toshokan de" (※Hiroki) (彼女と僕と図書館で / Her and I at the Library) |
| 4. | "Kokuhaku Sunzentsu!" (※Shinya) (告白寸前っ！ / Verge of Confessing!) |
| 5. | "Oretachi no Relation" (※Shinya) (俺たちのリレーション / Our Relations) |
| 6. | "Yakusoku no Cafe" (※Hiroki) (約束のカフェ / Cafe Promise) |

DVD3
| No. | Title | Length |
|---|---|---|
| 1. | "Natsu wa Owaranai" (※Shinya, Hiroki) (夏は終わらない / Summer's Not Over) |
| 2. | "Last Love" (※Hiroki) |
| 3. | "Game" (※Hiroki) |
