= Lead discography =

- Studio albums: 9
- Live albums: 17
- Compilation albums: 6
- Singles: 33
- Video albums: 7
- Music videos: 54
- Remix albums: 2

The discography of Japanese hip-hop group Lead includes 9 studio albums, 1 compilation album, 1 remix album, 16 live albums and 32 singles. Their first sixteen singles were released under the Pony Canyon sub-label Flight Master; since, their singles have been strictly under Pony Canyon.

Lead debuted on July 31, 2002 with the single "Manatsu no Magic". Their following single, "Show Me the Way" (2002), led to them winning the Best Newcomer Award during the 44th annual Japan Record Awards. Their debut studio album, Life on da Beat, was released on April 23, 2003.

Initially releasing one album a year since their debut (2003) up until Feel the Vibes (2008), the group began slowing their releases; however, they would continue to release an annual single and host their annual Upturn tour. Their next studio album, Now or Never, would not be released for another four years in 2012. This would also be their last album with leader and lead vocalist Hiroki Nakadoi. The single Still, released five months after Now or Never on December 12, 2012, would be their last single with Hiroki.

Beginning in 2012, the group would begin to release two singles a year. Their success on the Oricon Singles Chart would also increase, leading to a string of top-five releases for the next five years – something that they had not experienced as a group prior. Their eighth studio album, The Showcase, became their highest charting album throughout their career, peaking at number 2 on the Oricon Albums Chart. Their following studio album, Milestone, while charting lower than The Showcase, became their longest charting album, remaining on the charts for seven weeks.

== Albums ==
=== Studio albums ===
#	Album information	Sales
1st / Debut	Life on da Beat: Released: April 23, 2003; Oricon top 200 position: 5	30,214
2nd	Brand New Era: Released: August 25, 2004; Oricon top 200 position: 11	22,415
3rd	Lead! Heat! Beat!: Released: August 10, 2005; Oricon top 200 position: 15	17,594
4th	4: Released: July 19, 2006; Oricon top 200 position: 18	9,784
5th	Feel the Vibes: Released: March 5, 2008; Oricon top 200 position: 44	5,409
6th	Now or Never: Released: July 18, 2012; Oricon top 200 position: 6	20,479
7th	The Showcase: Released: June 8, 2016; Oricon top 200 position: 2	23,000
8th	Milestone: Release: July 18, 2018; Oricon top 200 position: 7	15,405
9th	Singularity: Release: March 18, 2020; Oricon top 200 position: 12	5,196
10th	XTLIKE: Release: September 4, 2024; Oricon top 200 position: 12	6,992

=== Extended plays ===
#	Album information	Sales
1st	Reprise: Released: September 24, 2025; Oricon top 200 position: 17	

=== Compilation albums ===
#	Album information	Sales
1st	Christmas Harmony: Vision Factory Presents: Released: November 21, 2007; Oricon top 200 position: 89	
2nd	Spring Harmony: Vision Factory Presents: Released: February 13, 2008	
3rd	Flower Festival: Vision Factory Presents: Released: March 19, 2008	
4th	Lead Tracks: Listener's Choice: Released: August 6, 2008; Oricon top 200 position: 67	5,409
5th	Heartbeat: Released: December 25, 2019	
6th	Lead the Best: Released: July 31, 2022; Oricon top 200 position: 34	2,482

=== Remix albums ===
#	Album information	Sales
1st	Buddies (with W-inds and Flame): Released: March 19, 2003	47,810
2nd	Joy Joy Home Mix: Released: May 6, 2020	

== Singles ==
#	Single information	Sales
1st / Debut	"Manatsu no Magic" (真夏のMagic): Released: July 31, 2002; Oricon weekly peak: #18; From album: Life on da Beat	27,330
2nd	"Show Me the Way": Released: October 17, 2002; Oricon weekly peak: #7; From album: Life on da Beat	37,100
3rd	"Fly Away": Released: February 3, 2003; Oricon weekly peak: #10; From album: Life on da Beat	35,393
4th	"Funky Days!" (ファンキーデイズ!): Released: July 30, 2003; Oricon weekly peak: #10; From album: Brand New Era	34,843
5th	"Get Wild Life": Released: December 3, 2003; Oricon weekly peak: #9; From album: Brand New Era	25,000
6th	"Night Deluxe": Released: July 16, 2004; Oricon weekly peak: #5; From album: Brand New Era	33,000
7th	"Tenohira o Taiyō ni / Delighted" (手のひらを太陽に/Delighted): Released: October 27, 2004; Oricon weekly peak: #8; From album: Lead! Heat! Beat!	29,000
8th	"Atarashii Kisetsu e" (あたらしい季節へ): Released: April 13, 2005; Oricon weekly peak: #6; From album: Lead! Heat! Beat!	28,000
9th	"Baby Running Wild" (ベイビーランニンワイルド): Released: July 6, 2005; Oricon weekly peak: #11; From album: Lead! Heat! Beat!	16,000
10th	"Virgin Blue" (バージンブルー): Released: March 8, 2006; Oricon weekly peak: #9; From album: 4	16,000
11th	"Summer Madness": Released: July 21, 2006; Oricon weekly peak: #17; From album: 4	13,000
12th	"Drive Alive": Released: March 14, 2007; Oricon weekly peak: #14; From album: Feel the Vibes	14,000
13th	"Umi" (海): Released: July 18, 2007; Oricon weekly peak: #27; From album: Feel the Vibes	6,199
14th	"Stand Up!": Released: February 6, 2008; Oricon weekly peak: #20; From album: Feel the Vibes	12,000
15th	"Sunnyday": Released: July 7, 2008; Oricon weekly peak: #34; From album: Lead Tracks: Listener's Choice	3,348
16th	"GiraGira Romantic" (ギラギラRomantic): Released: August 5, 2009; Oricon weekly peak: #12; From album: Now or Never (Type B Edition)	12,000
17th	"Speed Star": Released: July 28, 2010; Oricon weekly peak: #11; From album: Now or Never	11,000
18th	"Hurricane": Released: August 10, 2011; Oricon weekly peak: #8; From album: Now or Never	18,715
19th	"Wanna Be with You": Released: March 14, 2012; Oricon weekly peak: #3; From album: Now or Never	25,937
20th	"Still": Released: December 12, 2012; Oricon weekly peak: #4; From album: The Showcase	30,190
21st	"Upturn": Released: June 19, 2013; Oricon weekly peak: #5; From album: The Showcase	41,224
22nd	"Green Days / Strings": Released: September 18, 2013; Oricon weekly peak: #4; From album: The Showcase	41,178
23rd	"Sakura" (サクラ): Released: February 26, 2014; Oricon weekly peak: #3; From album: The Showcase	41,559
24th	"Omoide Breaker" (想い出ブレイカー): Released: September 17, 2014; Oricon weekly peak: #4; From album: The Showcase	43,227
25th	"My One": Released: March 4, 2015; Oricon weekly peak: #6; From album: The Showcase	35,727
26th	"Yakusoku" (約束): Released: November 25, 2015; Oricon weekly peak: #5; From album: The Showcase	32,668
27th	"Tokyo Fever" (トーキョーフィーバー): Released: March 8, 2017; Oricon weekly peak: #5; From album: Milestone	28,671
28th	"Beautiful Day": Released: August 23, 2017; Oricon weekly peak: #6; From album: Milestone	17,728
29th	"Bumblebee": Released: April 25, 2018; Oricon weekly peak: #2; From album: Milestone	18,791
30th	"Be the Naked": Released: January 30, 2019; Oricon weekly peak: #7; From album: Singularity	20,628
31st	"Summer Vacation": Released: July 24, 2019; Oricon weekly peak: #8; From album: Singularity	22,475
32nd	"Hide and Seek / Sunset Refrain" (サンセット・リフレイン): Released: February 19, 2020; Oricon weekly peak: #3; From album: Singularity	17,777
33rd	"Tuxedo" (タキシード): Released: September 23, 2020; Oricon weekly peak: #4; From album: Lead the Best and XTLIKE	19,585
34th	"Sonic Boom": Released: August 25, 2021; Oricon weekly peak: #10; From album: Lead the Best and XTLIKE	6,716x
35th	"See Your Heart": Released: May 24, 2023; Oricon weekly peak: #5; From album: XTLIKE	5,815

== Digital releases ==
#	Single information
1st	"Billionaire": Released: October 6, 2023; Digital single; From album: XTLIKE
2nd	"Jack in the Beats": Released: February 25, 2024; Digital single; From album: XTLIKE
3rd	"Don't Stay": Released: June 5, 2024; Digital single; From album: XTLIKE
4th	"Roller Coaster": Released: September 10, 2025; Digital single; From album: Reprise

== DVD/VHS ==
	Release date	Title	Product number	Peak position	Chart run
1st	September 18, 2003	Lead Movies 1	PCVP-53254 (VHS); PCBP-50910 (DVD)	11	2
2nd	November 17, 2004	Lead 1st Live Tour: Brand New Era	PCVP-53401 (VHS); PCBP-51334 (DVD)		
3rd	March 16, 2005	Lead Movies 2	PCVP-53426 (VHS); PCBP-51393 (DVD)	9	1
4th	December 7, 2005	Lead Live Tour Upturn 2005	PCBP-51586	35	2
5th	December 6, 2006	Lead Upturn 2006 [4]	PCBP-51887	24	2
6th	December 12, 2007	Lead Upturn 2007: B.W.R	PCBP-51910	34	1
7th	August 6, 2008	Movies 3	PCBP-51558	40	2
8th	December 3, 2008	Lead Upturn 2008: Feel the Vibes	PCBP-51921	37	2
9th	December 9, 2009	Lead Upturn 2009: Summer Day & Night Fever	PCBP-51948	41	1
10th	December 8, 2010	Lead Upturn 2010: I'll Be Around	PCBP-52055	41	1
11th	February 2011	Lead Dramabox; Vision Factory Online Shop Limited			
12th	July 2011	Short Movie 4: Ignition; Vision Factory Online Shop Limited			
13th	December 21, 2011	Lead Upturn 2011: Sun×You	PCBP-52085	93	2
14th	December 26, 2012	10th Anniversary Tour Lead Upturn 2012: Now or Never	PCBP-52108	38	1
15th	December 25, 2013	Lead Upturn 2013: Leap	PCBP-53092	57	1
16th	December 24, 2014	Lead Upturn 2014: Attract	PCBP-52310	42	1
17th	May 13, 2015	Movies 4	PCBP-53125 (DVD); BRBP-00055 (Limited DVD)	11	1
18th	December 16, 2015	Lead Upturn 2015: Master Plan	PCBP-53134 (DVD); PCXP-50364 (Blu-ray)	53	1
19th	December 21, 2016	Lead Upturn 2016: The Showcase	PCBP-53157 (DVD); PCXP-50450 (Blu-ray)	57	2
20th	December 20, 2017	Lead 15th Anniversary Live Box 《Special Box Specification》	PCBP-53228 (DVD); PCXP-50542 (Blu-ray)	59	1
21st	December 19, 2018	Lead Upturn 2018: Milestone	PCBP-53261 (DVD); PCXP-50590 (Blu-ray)	17	1
22nd	December 18, 2019	Lead Upturn 2019: Sync	PCBP-53283 (DVD); PCXP-50708 (Blu-ray)	39	1
23rd	January 20, 2021	Lead Upturn 2020 Online Live: Trick or Lead with Movies 5	PCBP-53285 (DVD); PCXP-50795 (Blu-ray)	8	1
24th	March 30, 2022	Lead Upturn 2021 Online Live: Sonic Boom & GuiDance	PCBP-54423 (DVD); PCXP-50887 (Blu-ray)	12	1
25th	March 22, 2023	Lead 20th Anniversary Live: Kankin Dousai & Snow Magic	PCBP-54465 (DVD); PCXP-50946 (Blu-ray)	8	1
26th	September 27, 2023	Movies Best	PCBP-62375 (DVD); PCXP-60130 (Blu-ray)	15	2
26th	March 20, 2024	Lead Upturn 2023: Jack in the Beats	PCBP-54630 (DVD); PCXP-51056 (Blu-ray)	13	2

=== Solo DVD releases ===
	Release date	Title	Product number	Peak position	Chart run
1st	July 1, 2009	In Blue; Akira Kagimoto Documentary	PCBE-53128 (DVD)	70	1

== Musicals ==
Year	Title	Role	Notes
2008	Zipangu: Haruka Narudou (遥かなる道」)	*Hiroki Nakadoi as Liu Bang; *Shinya Taniuchi as Kinro; *Keita Furuya as Isenbo; *Akira Kagimoto as Ginwolf	
2010	Kizuna: Shounen yo Daikami wo Idake (絆 -少年よ、大紙を抱け-)	*Hiroki Nakadoi as Hitoshi Seto; *Shinya Taniuchi as Taichi Tojo; *Keita Furuya as Daisuke Uehara; *Akira Kagimoto as Ryuji Yuba	
2011	Shin Hinomaru Restaurant (新・日ノ丸レストラン)	*Keita Furuya as Ichiro	
2011	Tumbling Vol.2	*Akira Kagimoto as Shotaro Kanemura	
2011	Kokansetsu! (Replay)	*Shinya Taniuchi as Go Nakanishi	
2011	Kizuna 2011 (Shounen yo Daikami wo Dake)	*Hiroki Nakadoi as Hitoshi Seto; *Shinya Taniuchi as Taichi Tojo; *Keita Furuya as Daisuke Uehara; *Akira Kagimoto as Ryuji Yuba	
2011	Koisuru Watashi no Bakary	*Keita Furuya as Rei Mamiya	
2012	Tumbling Vol.3	*Akira Kagimoto as Kota Hiyoshi	
2013	Bussen (ぶっせん)	*Akira Kagimoto as Yuki Watanabe	
2013	Martini! (Tadaima, Satsuei 5 Jikan Oshi) (マティーニ! 〜ただ今、撮影5時間押し〜)	*Shinya Taniuchi as Gaku Kinoshita	
2014	Oretachi no Ashita (俺たちの明日)	*Shinya Taniuchi as Toshiro Odagiri	
2015	Super Loserz	*Keita Furuya	*Keita had a non-speaking role as an on-stage dancer
2016	Priscilla, Queen of the Desert	*Keita Furuya as Adam/Felicia	
2016	Roudoku Geki Gege	*Akira Kagimoto as Takayuki	
2017	Gifuu Doudou!! (義風堂々!!)	*Akira Kagimoto as Keiji Maeda	
2018	My Host-chan Reborn: Zetsusho! Osaka Minami Edition (私のホストちゃんREBORN〜絶唱！)	*Keita Furuya as Shion	
2019	Akuma to Tenshi (悪魔と天使 / Devil and Angel)	*Akira Kagimoto as Tadashi Kojima	
2019	Innocent: The Musical	*Keita Furuya as Charles-Henri Sanson; *Akira Kagimoto as Fersen	
2019	Priscilla, Queen of the Desert	*Keita Furuya as Adam/Felicia	
2021	Mademoiselle Mozart	*Keita Furuya as Shikaneda	
2022	Flower Drum Song	*Keita Furuya as One Tarr	*On April 22, some of the performances were cancelled due to several performers falling ill
2022	Tenshi ni Tsuite: Daraku Tenshi-hen (天使について〜堕落天使編〜)	*Akira Kagimoto as Leonardo da Vinci	
2022	Night Head 2041	*Akira Kagimoto as Naoto Kirihara	
2022	Alabaster	*Keita Furuya as Gen	
2023	Cesare II Creator of Destruction	*Akira Kagimoto	*Show was originally planned for 2020, but was postponed due to COVID-19. *Akira made appearances during the performances on January 30 and 31
2023	Rent	*Keita Furuya as Roger Davis	

== Promotional videos ==
=== Life on da Beat ===
- "Manatsu no Magic"
- "Show Me the Way"
- "Fly Away"

=== Brand New Era ===
- "Funky Days!"
- "Get Wild Life"
- "Night Deluxe"

=== Lead! Heat! Beat! ===
- "Tenohira wo Taiyou ni"
- "Atarashii Kisetsu e"
- "Baby Running Wild"

=== Lead Tracks: Listener's Choice ===
- "Sunnyday"

=== 4 ===
- "Virgin Blue"
- "Summer Madness"

=== Feel the Vibes ===
- "Drive Alive"
- "Umi"
- "Stand Up!"

=== Now or Never ===
- "GiraGira Romantic"
- "Speed Star"
- "Hurricane"
- "Wanna Be with You"
- "Stand and Fight"

=== The Showcase ===
- "Still"
- "Upturn"
- "Green Days"
- "Sakura"
- "Omoide Breaker"
- "My One"
- "Upturn" (Dance Focused ver.)
- "Green Days" (Shinya Tanuichi Solo Focused ver.)
- "Green Days" (Keita Furuya Solo Focused ver.)
- "Green Days" (Akira Yamaoka Solo Focused ver.)
- "Sakura" (Dance ver.)
- "Omoide Breaker" (Dance ver.)
- "My One" (Dance ver.)
- "Yakusoku"
- "Yakusoku" (Dance ver.)
- "Zoom Up"
- "Zoom Up" (Dance ver.)

=== Milestone ===
- "Tokyo Fever"
- "Tokyo Fever" (Dance ver.)
- "Beautiful Day"
- "Shampoo Bubble" (Image Movie in Hawaii)
- "Bumblebee"
- "Love or Love?"
- "Backpack" (Choreo Video)

=== Singularity ===
- "Be the Naked"
- "Summer Vacation"
- "Sunset Refrain"
- "Hide and Seek"

=== Lead the Best ===
- "Tuxedo"
- "Kangoku Rokku"
- "Sonic Boom"

== Participation works ==
- Buddies (March 19, 2003)
  "Fly Away" (Akira's Conquistador Remix)
  "Show me the way" (TinyVoice, Production Remix)
- Christmas Harmony: Vision Factory Presents (November 21, 2007)
  "Ding Dong"
  "OkiDoki Christmas"
- Spring Harmony: Vision Factory Presents (February 13, 2008)
  "Thanks for..."
- Flower Festival: Vision Factory Presents (March 19, 2008)
  "Dear My Flower"
- Heartbeat (December 25, 2019)
  "Manatsu no Magic"
  "Virgin Blue 2010"
- Wormhole / GboySwag (November 18, 2019)
  "Chao Zhan Kai" feat. Lead (Japanese ver.) (超展開 / Super Expansion)
- 20XX "We are" / w-inds. album (November 24, 2021)
  "The Christmas Song" feat. Da Pump & Lead

== Unreleased songs ==
Songs that did not garner an official release, but were performed at live venues.

- "Arashi no Hibi" (嵐の日々 / Stormy Days) (August 18, 2004)
  Kamachi tie-in song.
- "Tribal Party" (November 17, 2004)
  Lyrics: Lead / Composition & Arrangement: Hiroki Nakadoi
- "LD Style" (December 7, 2005)
  Lyrics: Lead / Composition: Hiroki Nakadoi & Hayabusa / Arrangement: Hayabusa
- "Time to Jam", "356Step" (December 6, 2006)
  Composition: Katsu / Arrangement: e-catwork
- "B.W.R", "Sweetest Taboo", "Red Eye Night", "Features" (December 12, 2007)
  Arrangement: Mr Flavor (Need a Beat)

== Films ==
- Boutaoshi! (2003)

Shinya Tanuichi as Tsuguo Takayama
Akira Kagimoto as Atsushi Tabuchi
Keita Furuya as Suzumi Manabu
Hiroki Nakadoi as Toru Akasaka (Nakkan)

- Deep Love (2004)

Keita Furuya as Yoshiyuki

- Kamachi (2004)

Shinya Tanuichi as Kamachi Yamada
Keita Furuya as Sayama Yuichi
Akira Kagimoto as Himuro Kosuke
Hiroki Nakadoi as Shun Iijma

- Oretachi no Ashita (2014)

Shinya Taniuchi as Tsuyoshi Kakinoki

== Television ==
- Deep Love: Ayu no Monogatari (October – December 2004)

Keita Furuya as Yoshiyuki

- Pink no Idenshi (October 3 – December 2005)

Hiroki Nakadoi as Taichi Kobayashi

- Shinsengumi Peace Maker (January 2010–present)

Shinya Tanuichi as Toshizou Hijikata

- Konya wa Kokoro Dake Daite (March – April 2014)

Shinya Tanuichi as Hashii Shougo
