= Lead the Best =

Compilation album by Lead
- Released: July 31, 2022
- Recorded: 2002–2022
- Genre: Hip hop; pop; R&B
- Label: Pony Canyon

Lead chronology
Joy Joy Home Mix (2020)	Lead the Best (2022)	XTLIKE (2024)

Singles from Lead the Best
- 1. "Tuxedo" Released: September 23, 2020; 2. "Sonic Boom" Released: August 25, 2021

Lead the Best "Michishirube" (導標 (みちしるべ) / Guidepost) is the second compilation album by Japanese hip hop group Lead, released on July 31, 2022. The album debuted at No. 6 on Oricon.

The collection includes their most recent singles "Tuxedo" and "Sonic Boom", along with a new song recorded for the album titled "Michishirube".

Between April 29 and June 9, whichever songs were the most popular between twelve streaming platforms, including Spotify, Apple Music, Amazon Music, Rakuten Music and KKBOX, were included on the fourth CD.

== Information ==
Lead the Best "Michishirube" was released on July 31, 2022, and is the group's first compilation album since Lead Tracks: Listener's Choice, which was released in 2008.

The album debuted at No. 6 on the Oricon Albums Charts before reaching a peak of No. 5 on the second day. The album took No. 34 on the weekly charts with a first week sales of 2,482.

The album was released in three editions: 3CD, 4CD+DVD and 4CD+DVD+Photobook. The first three discs house every single the group has released since their debut with "Manatsu no Magic" (2002) until their most recent single "Sonic Boom" (2021). The fourth disc contains a selection of the most popular songs that were streamed on various platforms between April 29 and June 9. The DVD contains a selection of live performances from various tours the group had performed throughout the years. The photobook edition was available through pre-orders on Pony Canyon's online shop between the months of April and June.

== Promotional activities ==
Prior to the album's release, Lead released two singles, "Tuxedo" and "Sonic Boom".

"Tuxedo" was the thirty-third single released Lead on September 23, 2020, and first post their ninth studio album Singularity. It debuted at No. 5 on Oricon. It was released as a standard CD, in two CD+DVD editions, and in a CD+booklet edition. Both CD+DVD editions include "Tuxedo" and coupling track "Kangoku Rokku", while the CD+Booklet contains "Tuxedo" and "Wild Fight". The Type A DVD includes the music video and making video of the title track. The Type B DVD carried their Lead Special Winter Live, which was performed on February 18, 2020, at Harevutai in Tokyo. The song "Kangoku Rokku" was a cover of Elvis Presley's 1957 song "Jailhouse Rock". It became the first time Lead had released a song completely performed in English since their debut in 2002. Its corresponding music video was later released on the streaming platform YouTube.

"Sonic Boom" was their thirty-fourth single released on August 25, 2021, and was their only single released in 2021. It debuted at No. 10 on Oricon. The DVD contained excerpts from their Lead Special Winter Live, which was performed on February 18, 2020, at Harevutai in Tokyo.

The song "Michishirube" from Lead the Best was used as the ending theme for the television show Machicomi beginning September 1. It would also receive a music video on the group's official YouTube on July 20. The music video consisted of the members singing in the studio with clips of the group throughout the years interspersed between cuts - including footage with former member and leader Hiroki Nakadoi.

== Commemorative performance ==
On the album's day of release, Lead held their first public lives since 2019 due to COVID-19. They held two daytime performances and two nighttime performances at Tachikawa Stage Garden in Tachikawa, Tokyo. The songs performed at the venue were those chosen by fans, with the exception of the first song, "Manatsu no Magic". Hiroki Nakadoi, the group's previous leader who graduated in 2013, made an appearance during one of the evening shows.

== Track listing ==
Disc 1
No.	Title	Lyrics	Music	Arranger(s)	Length
1.	"Manatsu no Magic"	Yasushi Sasamoto	Yasushi Sasamoto	Yasushi Sasamoto	3:50
2.	"Show Me the Way"	Yasushi Sasamoto	Yasushi Sasamoto	Yasushi Sasamoto	4:03
3.	"Fly Away"	Yasushi Sasamoto • Katsu	Yasushi Sasamoto • Gen Ittetsu	Yasushi Sasamoto	5:04
4.	"Funky Days!"	Atsuyuki Enokido	Shinji Tamura • Nozomi Furukawa • MATARO MISAWA	Shinji Tamura	4:09
5.	"Get Wild Life"	Shinji Tamura • Katsu	Shinji Tamura	Shinji Tamura	3:39
6.	"Night Deluxe"	Shōko Fujibayashi	Daisuke "D.I" Imai	Daisuke "D.I" Imai	4:11
7.	"Tenohira o Taiyō ni"	Takashi Yanase	Hisashi Nawata	Izumi Taku	3:04
8.	"Delighted"	Shōko Fujibayashi • Mr. Blistah (rap)	Tatsuyuki Okawa	Tatsuyuki Okawa	4:35
9.	"Atarashii Kisetsu e"	Kyogo Kawaguchi	Yoshiaki Mutou	Kyogo Kwaguchi	5:18
10.	"Baby Runnin' Wild"	Satori Shiraishi	Satori Shiraishi	Satori Shiraishi	2:47
11.	"Virgin Blue"	Sagara Yoshiaki	Haya	Suzuki Kisaburo	3:44
12.	"Summer Madness"	Nice Hashimoto	Motonari Murakawa	Nice Hashimoto • Yasunori Tanaka	4:39
13.	"Drive Alive"	Lisa	Y.T.H	Kenji Ijima • Daisuke Kahara	3:31
Total length:					52:34

Disc 2
No.	Title	Lyrics	Music	Arranger(s)	Length
1.	"Umi"	MJ	Seiji Motoyama	MJ	5:23
2.	"Stand Up!"	Hiroki Nakadoi • Shinya Taniuchi • Keita Furuya • Akira Kagimoto	Seiji Motoyama	Seiji Motoyama	3:27
3.	"Sunnyday"	Hiroki Nakadoi • Shinya Taniuchi • Keita Furuya • Akira Kagimoto	Seiji Motoyama	Seiji Motoyama	4:15
4.	"GiraGira Romantic"	leonn	Hirofumi Hibino • Toru Watanabe	Hiroaki Serizawa	4:02
5.	"Speed Star"	Lantana • Shinya Taniuchi (rap)	Yuki Saki	Suzuki Kisaburo	3:21
6.	"Hurricane"	Hirofumi Asamoto • Shinya Tanuichi	Seiji Motoyama	Hirofumi Asamoto	4:03
7.	"Wanna Be with You"	Hiroki Nakadoi • Shinya Taniuchi • Keita Furuya • Akira Kagimoto • Seiji Motoyama	Vincent Degiorgio • David Fremberg	Seiji Motoyama	3:34
8.	"Still"	Hiroki Nakadoi • Shinya Taniuchi • Keita Furuya • Akira Kagimoto	Seiji Motoyama	Vincent Degiorgio • Anderz Wrethov	3:40
9.	"Upturn"	Keita Furuya • Shinya Taniuchi	Vincent DeGiorgio • Johan Rohr	Seiji Motoyama	4:38
10.	"Green Days"	AnDiSM	AnDiSM	MEG.ME	4:06
11.	"Strings"	Shinya Taniuchi	Yukiyoshi	Yukiyoshi	4:59
12.	"Sakura"	AnDiSM	Yukiyoshi	Yukiyoshi	4:05
13.	"Omoide Breaker"	Satori Shiraishi	Satori Shiraishi	Nao Harada	4:31
Total length:					54:04

Disc 3
No.	Title	Lyrics	Music	Arranger(s)	Length
1.	"My One"	Shibu	Shibu	Yōsuke Yamashita	4:43
2.	"Yakusoku"	AnDiSM • Shinya Taniuchi	nishi-ken	nishi-ken	3:48
3.	"Tokyo Fever"	Saeki Yuusuke • Clarabell • Shinya Tanuichi	Clarabell	Clarabell	3:54
4.	"Beautiful Day"	Lead	Drew Ryan Scott • Sean Alexander	Sean Alexander	3:45
5.	"Bumblebee"	Akira Kagimoto • Shinya Taniuchi (rap)	Drew Ryan Scott • Darren "Baby Dee Beats" Smith • Sean Alexander	Sean Alexander	3:31
6.	"Be the Naked"	Saeki Yuusuke • Shinya Taniuchi (rap)	Coach & Sendo	Obi Mhondera • Kyler Niko • Coach & Sendo	4:05
7.	"Summer Vacation"	shungo.	Ryo 'Lefty' Miyata	Fredrik "Figge" Boström • Ryo 'Lefty' Miyata • Lars Säfsund	3:52
8.	"Hide and Seek"	Akira Kagimoto • Shinya Taniuchi (rap)	Masat • Drew Ryan Scott	Masat	3:00
9.	"Sunset Refrain"	Shungo.	Kid Storm • Musoh • Slipkid	Kid Storm	3:04
10.	"Tuxedo"	Shungo. • Shinya Taniuchi	Kaz	Kentaro Akutsu	3:38
11.	"Sonic Boom"	Akira Kagimoto • Shinya Taniuchi (rap)	Akira Kagimoto • Nobuhiro Denda	Akira Kagimoto	3:55
12.	"Michishirube" (導標 / Guidepost)	Akira Kagimoto • Shinya Taniuchi	nishi-ken	Akira Kagimoto	6:07
Total length:					47:32

Disc 4
No.	Title	Lyrics	Music	Arranger(s)	Length
1.	"Fuyuiro Girl"	Kenji Tokuda	Kenji Tokuda	Kenji Tokuda	5:11
2.	"Get Over"	Keita Furuya	Hikari	Erik Lidbom • Hikari	3:57
3.	"Kimi wa Nanika ga Dekiru"	Michio Yamagami	Akira Sasaki	Toshiyuki Kimori	3:10
4.	"Love or Love?"	Funk Uchino	Samdell • Funk Uchino	Samdell • Funk Uchino	4:03
5.	"Fairy Tale"	J. Bright • Shinya Taniuchi	Akira Kagimoto	Akira Kagimoto	4:49
6.	"Loud! Loud! Loud!"	Keita Furuya • Shinya Taniuchi	Drew Ryan Scott • Sean Alexander • Darren "Baby Dee Beats" Smith	Drew Ryan Scott • Sean Alexander • Darren "Baby Dee Beats" Smith	3:07
7.	"Depend on Me"	Yuki Tsujimura	Erik Lidbom • Yuki Tsujimura	Erik Lidbom	3:50
8.	"Dear"	Makoto Furuya	Hiroo Yamaguchi	REO	4:58
9.	"Backpack"	Akira Kagimoto	Ricky Hanley • Peter Boyes • Sebastian Thott	Ricky Hanley • Peter Boyes • Sebastian Thott	3:36
10.	"Milk Tea"	7chi子♪ • Shinya Tanuichi (rap)	Albin Nordqvist • Eric Ng	Albin Nordqvist	3:17
11.	"No Doubt"	Yasushi Sasamoto • KATSU	Yasushi Sasamoto	Yasushi Sasamoto	3:55
12.	"Anthem"	Akira Kagimoto • Shinya Taniuchi (rap)	Akira Kagimoto	Akira Kagimoto	3:05
13.	"Voice"	AnDisM	AnDisM	ikutaMachine	4:02
14.	"Hateshinaku Hiroi Kono Sekai no Nakade"	Susumu Kawaguchi	Susumu Kawaguchi	Sadahiro Nakano • Mr. Blistah	3:47
15.	"Let's Get on It"	7chi子♪ • John Acosta • Shinya Tanuichi	John Acosta	John Acosta	2:59
16.	"Be Happy"	Kentaro Akutsu	Yasushi Sasamoto	Yasushi Sasamoto	4:39
17.	"With U"	AnDisM	AnDisM	AnDisM	4:25
18.	"Give Me Your Best Shot"	Keita Furuya	Alexander Holmgren • Command Freaks	Alexander Holmgren • Command Freaks	3:23
19.	"Say Good-Bye Say Hello"	Akira Kagimoto • Shinya Taniuchi	Matt Cab • RYUJA	Matt Cab • RYUJA	4:30
Total length:					74:43

DVD: Best Live Selection
No.	Title	Length
1.	"One for da Soul" (1st Live Tour ~Brand New Era~)
2.	"Night Deluxe" (1st Live Tour ~Brand New Era~)
3.	"Manatsu no Magic" (1st Live Tour ~Brand New Era~)
4.	"Prism" (Lead Live Tour Upturn 2005)
5.	"Deep in My Heart" (Lead Upturn 2006: 4)
6.	"I Believe" (Lead Upturn 2006: 4)
7.	"Love Rain" (Lead Upturn 2007 ~BWR~)
8.	"What cha gonna?" (Lead Upturn 2007 ~B.W.R~)
9.	"Baby What Turns You On" (Lead Upturn 2008 ~Feel the Vibes~)
10.	"Sunnyday" (Lead Upturn 2008 ~Feel the Vibes~)
11.	"Thanks for..." (Lead Upturn 2008 ~Feel the Vibes~)
12.	"Hikari" (Lead Upturn 2010 ~I'll Be Around★~)
13.	"Hurricane" (Lead Upturn 2011 ~Sun×You~)
14.	"Stand and Fight" (10th Anniversary Tour Lead Upturn 2012 ~Now or Never~)
15.	"Twilight" (Lead Upturn 2013 ~Leap~)
16.	"Ame-Nochi-kun" (Lead Upturn 2013 ~Leap~)
17.	"Lead Dance Performance" (Lead Upturn 2013 ~Leap~)
18.	"Dear" (Lead Upturn 2014 ~Attract~)
19.	"With U" (Lead Upturn 2014 ~Attract~)
20.	"Fairy Tale" (Lead Upturn 2015 ~Master Plan~)
21.	"Speechless" (Lead Upturn 2015 ~Master Plan~)
22.	"Loud!Loud!Loud!" (Lead Upturn 2016 ~The Showcase~)
23.	"Let's Get On It" (Lead Upturn 2016 ~The Showcase~)
24.	"Green Days" (Lead Upturn 2016 ~The Showcase~)
25.	"Kokorozashi ~KO.KO.RO.ZA.SHI~" (Lead Upturn 2016 ~The Showcase~)
26.	"Fly Away" (Lead 15th Anniversary Live ~Kan Ima Shirube-sai~)
27.	"Still" (Lead 15th Anniversary Live ~Kan Ima Shirube-sai~)
28.	"Love or Love?" (Lead Upturn 2018 ~Milestone~)
29.	"Give Me Your Best Shot" (Lead Upturn 2018 ~Milestone~)
30.	"Be the Naked" (Lead Upturn 2019 ~Sync~)
31.	"Wake me up" (Lead Upturn 2019 ~Sync~)
32.	"Singularity" (Lead Upturn 2020 Online Live ~Trick or Lead~)
33.	"Te Quiero Mucho" (Lead Upturn 2021 Online Live ~Sonic Boom~)

== Special release events ==
Special Album "Lead the Best" Launch Events

1. September 3, 2022: Asunal Kanayama Aichi (Free Live/Autograph Session)
2. September 4, 2022: Abeno Q's Mall Osaka (Free Live/Autograph Session)
3. September 10, 2022: isME! Oheso Hiroba Miyagi (Free Live/Autograph Session)
4. September 11, 2022: Queens Square Yokohama 1F Queen's Circle Kanagawa (Free Live/Autograph Session)
5. October 8, 2022: Canal City Hakata Fukuoka (Free Live/Autograph Session)

== Charts ==
Oricon chart performance for Lead the Best "Michishirube"
Release	Chart	Peak position	Total sales
July 31, 2022	Oricon Daily Albums Chart	5	
July 31, 2022	Oricon Weekly Albums Chart	34	2,482

Sales chart performance for singles from Lead the Best
Date	Title	Peak position	Sales
September 23, 2020	"Tuxedo"	5	9,585
August 25, 2021	"Sonic Boom"	10	6,716
