= Movies Best =

Video by Lead
- Released: September 27, 2023
- Recorded: 2002–2023
- Genre: Pop, hip hop
- Label: Pony Canyon; DVD (PCBP-62375); Blu-ray (PCXP-60130)

Lead chronology
Lead 20th Anniversary Live: Kankin Dousai & Snow Magic (2023)	Movies Best (2023)	Lead Upturn 2023: Jack in the Beats (2024)

Movies Best (stylized as MOVIES BEST) is the sixth compilation DVD/Blu-ray released by Japanese hip-hop group Lead. It charted at No. 15 on the Oricon charts, where it remained for two weeks. Movies Best contained every music video since Lead's debut in 2002 with "Manatsu no Magic" to their most recent video "See Your Heart" in 2023.

It was released on DVD and Blu-ray.

== Information ==
Movies Best is the sixth compilation DVD released by the Japanese hip-hop group Lead, released on September 27, 2023. It charted in the top twenty of the Oricon DVD charts at No. 15, and remained on the charts for two weeks.

It was released as a 3-disc set on DVD and Blu-ray, along with a forty-six page booklet. Music videos spanned across the first two discs and footage of Lead traveling to sacred places around Japan was on the third. A limited edition box set was released on Pony Canyon's official site for a limited time. The box set included the three Blu-ray discs, along with a ninety-six page booklet and a USB containing a recorded message from one of the members.

The release contained almost every music video the group had released since their debut in 2002 with "Manatsu no Magic." However, the videos "Backpack" (2018), "Kangoku Rokku" (2020), "Seasons" (2021) and "Milk Tea" (2021) were omitted. These videos had previously been released on the official YouTube page for Lead.

== Track listing ==
Disc 1: Music Video
No.	Title	Length
1.	"Manatsu no Magic" (Music Video)	4:00
2.	"Show me the way" (Music Video)	4:13
3.	"Fly Away" (Music Video)	4:54
4.	"Funky Days!" (Music Video)	3:38
5.	"Get Wild Life" (Music Video)	4:09
6.	"Night Deluxe" (Music Video)	4:19
7.	"Tenohira wo Taiyou ni" (Music Video)	4:08
8.	"Atarashii Kisetsu e" (Music Video)	5:27
9.	"Baby Running Wild" (Music Video)	3:11
10.	"Virgin Blue" (Music Video)	3:50
11.	"Summer Madness" (Music Video)	5:17
12.	"Drive Alive" (Music Video)	3:38
13.	"Umi" (Music Video)	5:23
14.	"Stand Up!" (Music Video)	4:34
15.	"Sunnyday" (Music Video)	4:26
16.	"GiraGira Romantic" (Music Video)	3:58
17.	"Speed Star★" (Music Video)	3:19
18.	"Wanna Be with You" (Music Video)	3:34
19.	"Stand and Fight" (Music Video)	4:00
20.	"Still" (Music Video)	3:37

Disc 2: Music Video
No.	Title	Length
1.	"Upturn" (Music Video)	4:54
2.	"Green Days" (Music Video)	4:21
3.	"Strings" (Music Video)	4:57
4.	"Sakura" (Music Video)	4:16
5.	"Omoide Breaker" (Music Video)	4:29
6.	"My One" (Music Video)	5:07
7.	"Yakusoku" (Music Video)	3:51
8.	"Zoom Up" (Music Video)	3:56
9.	"Tokyo Fever" (Music Video)	4:13
10.	"Beautiful Day" (Music Video)	3:44
11.	"Bumblebee" (Music Video)	4:00
12.	"Love or Love?" (Music Video)	4:08
13.	"Be the Naked" (Music Video)	4:07
14.	"Summer Vacation" (Music Video)	2:57
15.	"Hide and Seek" (Music Video)	3:01
16.	"Sunset Refrain" (Music Video)	3:06
17.	"Tuxedo" (Music Video)	3:43
18.	"Sonic Boom" (Music Video)	3:56
19.	"Michishirube" (Music Video)	6:07
20.	"See Your Heart" (Music Video)	3:26

Disc 3: New Video
No.	Title	Length
1.	"Lead Seichi Junrei" (Lead 聖地巡礼 / Lead Pilgrimage to Sacred Places)

== Charts ==
Oricon DVD Charts
Release	Chart	Peak position
September 27, 2023	Oricon Weekly Chart	15
