= Lead 20th Anniversary Live: Kankin Dousai & Snow Magic =

Video by Lead
- Released: March 22, 2023
- Recorded: 2022
- Genre: Pop; hip hop
- Label: Pony Canyon

Lead chronology
Lead Upturn 2021 Online Live: Sonic Boom & GuiDance (2022)	Lead 20th Anniversary Live: Kankin Dousai & Snow Magic (2023)	Movies Best (2023)

Lead 20th Anniversary Live ~Kankin Dousai & Snow Magic~ (感今導祭 / Guiding Emotions) is a video release by Japanese hip-hop group Lead, released on March 22, 2023. It debuted at No. 8 on the Oricon DVD charts.

The set featured two separate performances spanning across two DVDs or Blu-rays to celebrate the group's twentieth anniversary in the music industry, having debuted in 2002 with the song "Manatsu no Magic".

The first DVD featured the live performance to celebrate their anniversary Lead 20th Anniversary Live ~Kankin Dousai~, which the group held in Tachikawa, Tokyo in July. The second disc held their December 3 performance of their Snow Magic concert, which was held at the Ex Theater Roppongi in Tokyo.

Both performances were performed in front of live audiences for the first time since 2020. The group had previously been performing online lives due to the COVID-19 pandemic in Japan.

== Information ==
Lead 20th Anniversary Live ~Kankin Dousai & Snow Magic~ is the nineteenth concert video released by Lead on March 22, 2023. It debuted at No. 8 on the Oricon DVD Charts and took No. 12 on the weekly ranking. The set spanned across two discs, released on both DVD and Blu-ray, with each performance being housed on a separate disc.

Lead 20th Anniversary Live ~Kankin Dousai~ became their first concert performed in front of a live audience since 2019, whereas they had been performing online lives due to COVID-19 precautions. The anniversary live was held at the Tachikawa Stage Garden in Tachikawa, Tokyo on July 31, 2022, the same day their compilation album Lead the Best was released. The songs performed at the venue were those chosen by fans, with the exception of the first song, "Manatsu no Magic". During one of the evening performances, former group member and leader, Hiroki Nakadoi, made an appearance.

Winter Live 2022 ~Snow Magic~ was performed at the Ex Theater Roppongi in Tokyo on December 3, 2022. During their performance, they performed the song "Ding Dong", which was originally placed on Christmas Harmony: Vision Factory Presents, which was an album compilation of various artists under the Pony Canyon label in 2007.

== Promotional activities ==
Preorders through Amazon Japan included one of three posters based on a first-come, first-served basis. On Pony Canyon's official site, a special box edition was available for preorder through January 21 to February 11. The edition featured both concerts, a bonus video containing behind-the-scenes footage, a CD containing an audio version of their anniversary concert and a photobook.

== Track listing ==
- Disc 1: Lead 20th Anniversary Live ~Kankin Dousai~
1. "Manatsu no Magic"
2. Melody ~"Summer Madness" / "Funky Days!" / "Green Days" / "Sunnyday" / "Virgin Blue" / "Show me the way"~
3. "Hateshinaku Hiroi Kono Sekai no Nakade"
4. "Tokio Night"
5. "Twilight"
6. "Yakusoku"
7. Melody ~"Fly Away" / "Love Rain" / "Still"~
8. "Upturn"
9. "I believe"
10. "Dear"
11. "Summer Vacation"
12. "Sonic Boom"
13. "Be the Naked"
  -Encore-
14. "Night Deluxe"
15. "Michishirube"
16. "Manatsu no Magic"
- Disc 2: Lead Winter Live 2022 ~Snow Magic~
1. "Hide and Seek"
2. "Moonlight Shower"
3. Melody ~"Let's Get On It" / "Funk This Time!"~
4. "Love or Love?"
5. "Ding Dong"
6. "My One"
7. "Field of Soul"
8. "Amazing"
9. "Fuyuiro Girl"
10. "Shizuku ~Sizk~"
11. "Cosmic Drive"
12. "Anytime"
  -Encore-
13. "Ordinary"
14. "Get Wild Life"
15. "Shining Day"

== Charts ==
Oricon DVD Charts
Release	Chart	Peak position
March 22, 2023	Oricon Daily Chart	8
March 22, 2023	Oricon Weekly Chart	12
