= Lead Upturn 2015: Master Plan =

Video by Lead
- Released: December 16, 2015
- Recorded: 2015
- Genre: Pop, hip hop
- Label: Pony Canyon; DVD (PCBP-53134); Blu-ray (PCXP-50364)

Lead chronology
Movies 4 (2015)	Lead Upturn 2015: Master Plan (2015)	Lead Upturn 2016: The Showcase (2016)

Lead Upturn 2015 〜Master Plan〜 (stylized as Lead Upturn 2015 〜MASTER PLAN〜) is the twelfth concert video released by the Japanese hip-hop group Lead. The video was released on December 16, 2015. It charted at #53 on the Oricon DVD charts and #57 on the Blu-ray charts.

Due to having no corresponding album, the group performed various songs from throughout their career, including "Night Deluxe" (2004) and "Love Magic" (2005).

== Information ==
Lead Upturn 2015 〜Master Plan〜 is the twelfth concert video released by the Japanese hip-hop group Lead on December 16, 2015. It charted at #53 on the Oricon DVD charts and #57 on the Oricon Blu-ray charts, remaining on the charts for one week and two weeks, respectively.

The video was released on both DVD and Blu-ray, with each edition harboring different content. The bonus content on the DVDs featured their encore songs "Sunnyday" and "It's My Style", while the content on the Blu-ray featured the encore songs "It's My Style" and "Night Deluxe".

This would be their last tour to not have a corresponding studio album, whereas their following concert would correspond with their The Showcase album.

The tour featured new dancer show-hey, while DJ HIRORON took charge of the musical production for the first time in six years. For the performances, the group performed various songs throughout their career, including "Virgin Blue" from 4 (2006) and "Extreme girl" from Brand New Era (2004). The majority of songs performed were songs post-2012, which the group had recorded as a three-member unit after the graduation of their group leader, Hiroki Nakadoi.

The performance utilized on the DVD and Blu-ray was of their September 5, 2015 performance at Nakano Sun Plaza in Nakano, Tokyo.

== Track listing ==
1. "Fairy tale"
2. "Extreme girl"
3. "Super Disco"
4. "Still"
5. "Upturn"
6. "Burning up!"
7. "Real Live"
8. "Gimme Your Love"
9. "I don't give a damn"
10. "Change myself"
11. "Hungry Sniper"
12. "stringe"
13. "My One"
14. "Akeneiro Somaru Koro Ni"
15. "Love Magic"
16. "Virgin Blue"
17. "Omoide Breaker"
18. "Can't Stop Loving You"
19. "Speechless"
  <ENCORE>
20. "Sunnyday (DVD bonus track)
21. "Night Deluxe" (Blu-ray bonus track)
22. "It's My Style"

== Charts (Japan) ==
Release	Chart	Peak position	Chart run
December 16, 2015	Oricon DVD Chart	53	1 week
December 16, 2015	Oricon Blu-ray Chart	57	2 weeks
