= Lead 15th Anniversary Live Box =

2017 live DVD collection released by Japanese hip-hop group Lead

Video by Lead
- Released: December 20, 2017
- Recorded: 2017
- Genre: Pop, hip hop
- Label: Pony Canyon; DVD (PCBP-53228); Blu-ray (PCXP-50542)

Lead chronology
Lead Upturn 2016: The Showcase (2016)	Lead 15th Anniversary Live Box (2017)	Lead Upturn 2018: Milestone (2018)

Lead 15th Anniversary Live Box: Special Box Shiyou (スペシャルBOX仕様 / Special Box Specification) is a special live DVD collection released by Japanese hip-hop group Lead on December 20, 2017. The live box featured two separate performances spanning across two DVDs to celebrate the group's fifteenth anniversary in the music industry, having debuted in 2002 with the song "Manatsu no Magic".

The first DVD featured the live performed to celebrate their anniversary, Lead 15th Anniversary Live ～Kan Ima Shirube-sai～, which the group held on July 29 and July 30 of that year; while the second DVD held their fifteenth live tour Lead Upturn 2017 ～This is Our Day～.

The live box charted at No. 59 on the Oricon DVD chart and No. 61 on the Blu-ray chart, remaining on the charts for one week.

== Information ==
Lead 15th Anniversary Live Box is a DVD/Blu-ray two disc collection released by the Japanese hip-hop group Lead on December 20, 2017. It reached No. 59 on the Oricon DVD chart and No. 61 on the Oricon Blu-ray chart, where it remained on each for one week.

The live box featured two separate performances spanning across two DVD/Blu-rays to celebrate the group's fifteenth anniversary in the music industry, having debuted on July 31, 2002, with the song "Manatsu no Magic". The first DVD/Blu-ray featured the live performed to celebrate their anniversary, Lead 15th Anniversary Live ～Kan Ima Shirube-sai～ (感今導祭 / Guiding Emotions), which the group held on July 29 and July 30th at the Maihama Amphitheater. The second disc held their fifteenth live tour Lead Upturn 2017 ～This is Our Day～ - the performance which was performed at Cosmos Theater (Kaizuka City Civic Cultural Hall) in Kaizuka, Osaka on September 10. Bonuses on both discs featured behind-the-scenes footage of both concerts and the collection of MCs.

For Lead 15th Anniversary Live ～Kan Ima Shirube-sai～, the group performed every a-side they had released since their debut in 2002, up until their then-most recent song "Beautiful Day", which had been released on August 23, 2017. The live was well-received, with people praising the group's stage presence and charisma, even with performing so many songs for one performance, many of which were dance tracks.

Lead Upturn 2017 ～This is Our Day～ was the group's fifteenth live tour. For the performance, most of the music utilized were songs from their seventh studio album The Showcase, which had been released the year prior in June 2016. They also performed the song "Shampoo Bubble", the coupling track to their single Beautiful Day, which had been released two weeks prior to the tour performance. The tour's set design received a positive response from fans, along with the chosen songs and overall enthusiasm of Keita, Shinya and Akira.

== Track listing ==
- DVD1: Lead 15th Anniversary Live ～Kan Ima Shirube-sai～
1. "Fly Away"
2. "Funky Days!"
3. "Get Wild Life"
4. "Night Deluxe"
5. "Tenohira wo Taiyou ni"
6. "Delighted"
7. "Atarashii Kisetsu e"
8. "Baby Running Wild"
9. "Virgin Blue"
10. "Summer Madness"
11. "Drive Alive"
12. "Umi"
13. "Stand Up!"
14. "Sunnyday"
15. "GiraGira Romantic"
16. "Speed Star"
17. "Hurricance"
18. "Wanna Be With You"
19. "Stand and Fight"
20. "Still"
21. "Upturn"
22. "Green Days"
23. "strings"
24. "Sakura"
25. "Omoide Breaker"
26. "My One"
27. "Yakusoku"
28. "Zooom up"
29. "Tokyo Fever"
30. "Beautiful Day"
  <Encore>
31. "Manatsu no Magic"
32. "Show me the way"
33. "ONE"
  Bonus Footage
34. "Lead 15th Anniversary ～Kan Ima Shirube-sai～" (Behind the Scenes)
35. "Lead 15th Anniversary ～Kan Ima Shirube-sai～" (MC Collection)
- DVD2: Lead Upturn 2017 ～This is Our Day～
1. "Zoom up"
2. "Burning up!"
3. "Stand by me"
4. "Jewel of Queen"
5. "Night Deluxe"
6. "Gimme a call"
7. "Shampoo Bubble"
8. "Moonlight Shower"
9. "Voice"
10. "Bokura no Yogaakeru Made"
11. "Fly Away"
12. "Wanna Be With You"
13. "Still"
14. "Upturn"
15. "Show me the way"
16. "Beautiful Day"
17. "Friendship"
18. "Loud! Loud! Loud!"
  <Encore>
19. "Manatsu no Magic"
20. "Virgin Blue"
21. "Say Good-by Say Hello"
  Bonus Footage
22. "Lead Upturn 2017 ～This is Our Day～" (Behind the Scenes)
23. "Lead Upturn 2017 ～This is Our Day～" (MC Collection)

== Charts ==
Release	Chart	Peak position
December 20, 2017	Oricon DVD Chart	59
December 20, 2017	Oricon Blu-ray Chart	61
