= Movies 4 =

Video by Lead
- Released: May 13, 2015
- Recorded: 2009–2015
- Genre: Pop, hip hop
- Label: Pony Canyon; DVD (PCBP-53125); Limited DVD (BRBP-00055)

Lead chronology
Lead Upturn 2014: Attract (2014)	Movies 4 (2015)	Lead Upturn 2015: Master Plan (2015)

Movies 4 (stylized as MOVIES4) is the fourth compilation DVD released by Japanese hip-hop group Lead. It charted at No. 11 on the Oricon charts, where it remained for one weeks. Movies 4 contained every music video from "GiraGira Romantic" (2009) to their then-most recent single "My One" (2015).

It was released as a standard DVD and a limited edition DVD, the latter of which contained the members interviewing each other one-on-one.

== Information ==
Movies 4 is the fourth compilation DVD released by the Japanese hip-hop group Lead, released on May 13, 2015. It charted in the top twenty of the Oricon DVD charts, taking the #11 spot and remaining on the charts for one week.

It was released in two editions: a regular DVD edition and a limited DVD edition. The first regular edition housed every music video between their release of "GiraGira Romantic" (2009) and "My One" (2015). The music videos could also be selected to contain audio commentary by the group. Also included were dance versions and member versions of select songs; namely "Green Day", "Upturn", "Sakura", "Omoide Breaker" and "My One". The limited editions housed one-on-one interviews conducted by the members of Lead as a bonus track.

The solo versions of "Green Days" were edited versions of the original music videos, with the camera focused only on the individual member, focusing on their upper torso while occasionally panning to their feet to show the footwork of the dance.

== Track listing ==
DVD
No.	Title	Length
1.	"GiraGira Romantic" (Music video)
2.	"Speed Star★" (Music video)
3.	"Wanna Be with You" (Music video)
4.	"Stand and Fight" (Music video)
5.	"Still" (Music video)
6.	"Upturn" (Music video)
7.	"Green Days" (Music video)
8.	"strings" (Music video)
9.	"Sakura" (Music video)
10.	"Omoide Breaker" (Music video)
11.	"My One" (Music video)
12.	"Upturn" (Dance focused version) (Music video)
13.	"Green Days" (Shinya Tanuichi solo focused version) (Music video)
14.	"Green Days" (Keita Furuya solo focused version) (Music video)
15.	"Green Days" (Akira Kagimoto solo focused version) (Music video)
16.	"Sakura" (Dance version) (Music video)
17.	"Omoide Breaker" (Dance version) (Music video)
18.	"My One" (Dance version) (Music video)
19.	"※Special Interview 〜Lead wants to hear from Lead〜" (スペシャルインタビュー 〜Leadが聞きたいLeadのコト〜)

※only available on limited editions

== Charts ==
Chart (2015)	Peak position
Oricon Weekly DVD Top 200	11
