= Lead Upturn 2013: Leap =

Lead Upturn 2013 ～Leap～

Video by Lead
- Released: December 25, 2013
- Recorded: 2013
- Genre: Pop, hip hop
- Label: Pony Canyon; DVD (PCBP-52085)

Lead chronology
10th Anniversary Tour Lead Upturn 2012: Now or Never (2012)	Lead Upturn 2013 ～Leap～ (2013)	Lead Upturn 2014: Attract (2014)

Lead Upturn 2013 ～Leap～ is the tenth concert DVD released by Japanese hip-hop group Lead released on December 25, 2013. It reached No. 57 on the Oricon charts, remaining on the chart for one week.

The tour became their first without leader Hiroki Nakadoi, whereas Hiroki had left the group due to feelings of inadequacy in April 2013. Due to this, all of the songs were redone for the lives, with either Keita or Akira covering Hiroki's initial parts in the original songs.

== Information ==
Lead Upturn 2013 ～Leap～ is the tenth concert DVD released by the Japanese hip hop group Lead. The tour was released one year after their previous tour, 10th Anniversary Tour Lead Upturn 2012: Now or Never, on Christmas of 2013. It charted at No. 57 on the Oricon DVD chart, where it remained for one week.

Although the tour did not have a corresponding album, many of the songs performed were from their studio album Now or Never. They also performed the songs from their then-most recent single Upturn ("Twilight", "Versus", "Take You Higher" and "Upturn") and songs from their earlier works ("Virgin Blue". "Summer Madness", "Privacy").

The tour was their first without leader Hiroki Nakadoi, whereas Hiroki left the group in April of that year due to feelings of inadequacy. With the exception of the songs from their Upturn single, all of the prior songs had originally been performed as a four-man group. While Keita would become the lead vocalist after Hiroki's departure, both Keita and Akira covered Hiroki's original lyrics.

The performance utilized on the DVD was of their finale at Nakano Sun Plaza in Nakano, Tokyo on August 25, 2013.

== Track listing ==
1. "Opening"
2. "Twilight"
3. "Versus"
4. "Unbalance na Kiss wo Shite"
5. "Real Live"
6. "Privacy"
7. "Night Deluxe"
  <DANCERS Performance 1>
8. "Take You Higher"
9. "Still"
10. "Ame Nochi-kun"
11. "Ordinary"
  <Lead DANCE Performance>
  <DANCERS Performance 2>
12. "strings"
13. "Hungry Sniper"
14. "Summer Madness"
15. "Virgin Blue"
16. "Love Magic"
17. "Upturn"
  <Encore>
18. "Friendship"
19. "Boom!! Boom!!"
20. "Color"
  <Double Encore>
21. "Green Days"
  <Extra shoot>
22. "Speechless"

== Charts ==
Release	Chart	Peak position
December 25, 2013	Oricon DVD Chart	57
