= Lead Upturn 2011: Sun x You =

Lead Upturn 2011 ～Sun×You～

Video by Lead
- Released: December 21, 2011
- Recorded: 2011
- Genre: Pop, hip hop
- Label: Pony Canyon; DVD (PCBP-52085)

Lead chronology
Lead Dramabox (2011)	Lead Upturn 2011 ～Sun×You～ (2011)	10th Anniversary Tour Lead Upturn 2012: Now or Never (2012)

Lead Upturn 2011 ～Sun×You～ is the eighth concert DVD released by Japanese hip hop group Lead, one year after their previous concert DVD on December 21, 2011. It peaked at No. 93 on the Oricon charts.

The tour did not have a corresponding album and most of the songs chosen to be performed were in the dance and electronica genre, including songs "Night Deluxe", "Speechless" and "Virgin Blue".

== Information ==
Lead Upturn 2011 ～Sun×You～ is the eighth concert DVD released by Japanese hip hop group Lead on December 21, 2011, one year after their previous concert DVD Lead Upturn 2010 ~I'll Be Around★~. The DVD peaked at number 93 on the Oricon DVD/Blu-ray Chart.

The tour became their third-consecutive concert to not have a corresponding album. The tour focused more on their dance-heavy songs that fit the tour's theme to allow the group to show more of their breakdancing and street dancing skills. Staying with the theme, the performance opened with each member giving a demonstration of their dance skills, cutting to their backup dancers between each member's introduction. Along with showing off each members' skills, the tour also showed focus on their backup dancers, which were given their own spotlight during the lives and on the performance utilized on the DVD.

The performance utilized on the DVD was of their final tour performance at Nakano Sun Plaza in Nakano, Tokyo on September 16, 2011.

== Track listing ==
<OPENING>

1. "Hurricane"
2. "Can't Stop"
3. "Hateshinaku Hiroi Kono Sekai no Nakade"
4. "Night Deluxe"
5. "Speechless"
6. "What cha gonna?"
  <DANCERS Performance 1>
7. "Unbalance na Kiss wo Shite"
  <DANCE 1>
8. "Walk"
9. "Dear"
10. "Jewel of Queen"
  <DANCE 2>
  <DANCERS Performance 2>
11. "Baby'cuz U!!"
12. "24HRS"
13. "Tasogare Gradation"
14. "Special Summer Medley" ～Umi / Funky Days! / Manatsu no Magic / Sunnyday / Summer Madness～
  <ENCORE>
15. "GiraGira Romantic"
16. "Sun×You"
  <Extra shoot>
17. "Backstage Document & Interview"
  <ENCORE>
18. "Virgin Blue"

== Charts ==
Release	Chart	Peak position
December 21, 2011	Oricon DVD Charts	93
