= Lead Upturn 2009: Summer Day & Night Fever =

Lead Upturn 2009 ～Summer Day & Night Fever～

Video by Lead
- Released: December 9, 2009
- Recorded: 2009
- Genre: Pop, hip hop
- Label: Flight Master; DVD (PCBP-51948)

Lead chronology
in blue (2009)	Lead Upturn 2009 ～Summer Day & Night Fever～ (2009)	Lead Upturn 2010: I'll Be Around (2010)

Lead Upturn 2009 ~Summer day & Night Fever~ is the sixth concert DVD released by the Japanese hip-hop group Lead, released a year after their previous concert DVD on December 9, 2009. It charted at #41 on the Oricon charts, remaining on the charts for one week.

While the tour did not have a corresponding album, the songs chosen were ones that were best suited for summer days and nights, with the first half of the concert being compiled of upbeat pop songs and the second half composed to their more dance-styled songs.

== Information ==
Lead Upturn 2009 ~Summer Day & Night Fever is the sixth concert DVD released by the Japanese hip-hop group Lead. It was released on December 9, 2009, a year after their previous concert DVD Lead Upturn 2008 ~Feel The Vibes~. It peaked on the Oricon DVD Charts at #41, only staying on the charts for one week.

The tour did not have a corresponding album, instead housing a summer-theme concept with styles of music geared towards the feelings of summer days and summer nights. The first leg of the concert contained predominantly upbeat pop music, while the second part of the concert held predominantly more toned-down dance and eurobeat/para para music.

During the concert, each member performed their solo song they had done for the various editions of GiraGira Romantic. Hiroki performed "Kimi ~Sakura~", Shinya performed "Follow me", Keita performed "You're the only one" and Akira performed "Stay with me".

The performance utilized on the DVD was of their performance at the Nakano Sun Plaza in Nakano, Tokyo.

== Track listing ==
1. "Sunnyday"
2. "Summer Madness"
3. "Fly Away"
4. "Get Wild Life"
5. "You're the only one" (Keita solo)
6. "Tokio Night"
7. "What cha gonna? / Extreme girl"
8. "Stay with me" (Akira solo)
9. "Baby what turns you on"
10. "I believe"
11. "Kimi ~Sakura~" (Hiroki solo)
12. "Only You Can Hurt Me"
13. "Night Deluxe"
14. "Follow me" (Shinya solo)
15. "High Tension Day"
16. "Virgin Blue"
17. "GiraGira Romantic" (encore 1)
18. "Manatsu no Magic" (encore 2)
19. "Drive Alive / Shining Day" (encore 3)
20. "One"

== Charts ==
Release	Chart	Peak position
December 9, 2009	Oricon DVD Charts	41
