= Lead Upturn 2014: Attract =

Lead Upturn 2014 ～Attract～

Video by Lead
- Released: December 24, 2014
- Recorded: 2014
- Genre: Pop, hip hop
- Label: Pony Canyon; DVD (PCBP-52310)

Lead chronology
Lead Upturn 2013: Leap (2013)	Lead Upturn 2014 ～Attract～ (2014)	Movies 4 (2015)

Lead Upturn 2014 ～Attract～ is the eleventh concert DVD released by Japanese hip-hop group Lead, released on December 24, 2014. It reached No. 42 on the Oricon DVD charts, remaining on the charts for only one week.

The video would be their last concert released solely on DVD, their later videos being released on both DVD and Blu-ray.

== Information ==
Lead Upturn 2014 ～Attract～ is the eleventh concert DVD released by Japanese hip-hop group Lead. It was released one year after their previous concert video, Lead Upturn 2013 ～Leap～, during the holiday season on December 24, 2014. It charted at No. 42 on the Oricon DVD Charts, only staying on the charts for one week.

The tour did not have a corresponding album. Instead, the group focuses on performing the songs throughout their career that had attracted the most people. Along with their more popular dance tracks, "Virgin Blue", "Cosmic Drive"" (2006), "Can't Stop Loving You" (2014), "Green Days" (2013), they also performed ballads from various albums, including "Dear" and "I believe" from Lead! Heat! Beat! (2005), and "Only You Can Hurt Me" from their debut album Life On Da Beat (2003). They also performed their then-new songs "Sakura", "With U" and "Just do it" from their single Sakura, and "Omoide Breaker" from their single of the same name.

The tour became their second without leader and lead vocalist Hiroki Nakadoi, whereas he graduated from the group in March 2013.

The performance utilized on the DVD was of their finale at Nakano Sun Plaza in Nakano, Tokyo on August 23, 2014.

== Track listing ==
1. <Opening>
2. "With U"
3. "Burning up!"
4. "What cha gonna?"
5. "Can't Stop Loving You"
6. "I believe"
7. "Fall In Love"
8. "Life is a party!"
9. "show me the way"
10. "Only You Can Hurt Me"
11. "Dear"
  <Lead DANCE Performance>
  <DANCERS Performance>
12. "Giant Steps"
13. "Omoide Breaker"
14. "Green Days"
15. "Cosmic Drive"
16. "Versus"
17. "Just do it"
  <Encore>
18. "Sakura"
19. "Virgin Blue"
20. "With U"
  Bonus Footage
21. "MC Collection"

== Charts (Japan) ==
Release	Chart	Peak position
December 24, 2014	Oricon DVD Chart	42
