= Lead Upturn 2018: Milestone =

Lead Upturn 2018 ～Milestone～

Video by Lead
- Released: December 19, 2018
- Recorded: 2018
- Genre: Pop, hip hop
- Label: Pony Canyon; DVD (PCBP-53261); Blu-ray (PCXP-50590)

Lead chronology
Lead 15th Anniversary Live Box (2017)	Lead Upturn 2018 ～Milestone～ (2018)	Lead Upturn 2019 ~Sync~ (2019)

Lead Upturn 2018: Milestone (stylized as Lead Upturn 2018 ～MILESTONE～) is the twenty-first video and fifteenth overall concert video released by Japanese hip-hop group Lead. The concert video was released on December 19, 2018. It debuted at No. 17 on the Oricon DVD chart, becoming their highest debuting concert video release.

The tour corresponded with their eighth studio album, Milestone, along with songs from previous albums, including "Baby'cuz U!" from 4 (2006), "Get Dizzy!" from Feel the Vibes (2008) and "What cha gonna?" from Brand New Era (2004).

== Information ==
Lead Upturn 2018 ~Milestone~ is the twenty-first video and fifteenth overall concert video released by Japanese hip-hop group Lead. The concert video - which was released on both DVD and Blu-ray - was released on December 19, 2018. It debuted on the Oricon DVD/Blu-ray Chart at No. 17, becoming their highest charting tour video at the time. It dropped in rank throughout the week, ending with the weekly ranking of No. 56 on the DVD chart and No. 67 on the Blu-ray chart.

The tour corresponded with their eighth studio album, Milestone, along with songs from previous albums, including "Baby'cuz U!" from 4 (2006), "Get Dizzy!" from Feel the Vibes (2008) and "What cha gonna?" from Brand New Era (2004).

The video was released as a two-disc set, which held the final concert and its finale. Along with the tour, it also featured the group's free live of their sixteenth anniversary of their official debut, "Manatsu no Magic". The performance, titled Lead 16th Anniversary -SUMMER SPECIAL LIVE-, kept in-step with their anniversary, whereas performance was held on July 31, 2018 ("Manatsu no Magic" was released July 31, 2002) on the island of Odaiba, the same day that their summer debut single had been released on.

The performance utilized from their Upturn tour was their concert held at Nakano Sun Plaza in Nakano, Tokyo on September 1, 2018, which concluded the tour.

== Promotional activities ==
As a promotional special, those who pre-ordered the Lead Upturn 2018 ~Milestone~ were given first-come, first-served specials, garnering a "Lead Christmas Postcard Set (3-Card Set)". Benefits were bundled with the items and delivered, or delivered to whichever shop the customer pre-ordered the concert video. Along with the postcards, customers were also able to receive a special poster.

== Track listing ==
- DVD1: Lead Upturn 2018 ~Milestone~

<OP. Untitled>

1. "Bumblebee"
2. "What cha gonna?"
3. "Love or Love?"
4. "Extreme girl"
5. "Get Dizzy!"
6. "Baby'cuz U!"
7. "Shizuku ~Sizk~"
8. "Backpack"
  <Dance Corner>
9. "Ame Nochi-kun"
10. "Tell Me Why"
11. "Kore Made, Kore Kara"
12. "Kimi to Aruku Mirai" (one-half ver.)
13. "Medalist"
14. "Kokorozashi 〜KO.KO.RO.ZA.SHI.〜"
15. "Give Me Your Best Shot"
16. "R.O.O.T.S"
17. "Tokyo Fever"
18. "Funk This Time!"
  <ENCORE>
19. "Beautiful Day"
20. "Always Love"
21. "Versus"
- DVD2: Lead 16th Anniversary -SUMMER SPECIAL LIVE-
1. "Summer Madness"
2. "Manatsu no Magic"
3. "Bumblebee"
4. "Love or Love?"
5. "Tokyo Fever"
6. "Beautiful Day"
7. "Backpack"
8. "Funk This Time!"
9. "It's My Style"
  Bonus Tracks
10. "「Lead Upturn 2018 ～MILESTONE～」Behind-the-Scenes
11. "MC Collection"

== Charts ==
Release	Chart	Peak position
December 29, 2018	Oricon DVD Chart	17
December 29, 2018	Oricon Blu-ray Chart	17
