= Power Records =

Power Records may refer to:

- Power Records (Canadian record label), a record label owned by Vincent DeGiorgio
- Power Records (Peter Pan records), an action-adventure-drama sub-label related to Peter Pan Records, a kids record label
