= Lead Upturn 2019: Sync =

Lead Upturn 2019 ～Sync～

Video by Lead
- Released: December 18, 2019
- Recorded: 2019
- Genre: Pop, hip hop
- Label: Pony Canyon; DVD (PCBP-53283); Blu-ray (PCXP-50708)

Lead chronology
Lead Upturn 2018: Milestone (2018)	Lead Upturn 2019 ～Sync～ (2019)	Lead Upturn 2020 Online Live: Trick or Lead with Movies 5 (2021)

Lead Upturn 2019: Sync (stylized as Lead Upturn 2019 ～SYNC～) is the twenty-second video and sixteenth overall concert video released by Japanese hip-hop group Lead. The concert video was released on December 18, 2019. It received a weekly ranking at No. 39 on the Oricon DVD charts.

Due to having no corresponding album, the tour borrowed songs from various singles, including their most recent singles Be the Naked and Summer Vacation. It also featured the original song "Cross Over", which had not been previously released.

Although it did not correspond with a studio album, many of the songs utilized were from their studio album Milestone.

== Information ==
Lead Upturn 2019 ~Sync~ is the sixteenth concert video released by Lead. It was released on December 18, 2019, one year after their previous concert video, Lead Upturn 2018 ~Milestone~. It charted at No. 39 on both the Oricon DVD charts and the Oricon Blu-ray charts.

The video was released on both DVD and Blu-ray. The concert carried songs from prior singles, including their more recent singles Be the Naked and Summer Vacation, both of which were released throughout the year of 2019. Along with featuring songs from their studio album Milestone, many of the chosen songs were newer and older summer-themed songs. The tour's title was given due to the group's performances and effects "syncing" up together more than prior tours.

The performance utilized on the DVD and Blu-ray was of their September 14, 2019 performance at Nakano Sun Plaza in Nakano, Tokyo.

== Promotional activities ==
To help promote the album, those who purchased the video on its release date at eligible stores received one of three possible Christmas postcards on a first-come, first-served basis.

Those who ordered the DVD or Blu-ray at certain sites were eligible to receive a limited edition poster calendar. They were also given a chance to enter a lottery for tickets to "Lead New Year's Party", which was held in Tokyo on January 5, 2020.

== Track listing ==
<OPENING>

1. "Be the Naked"
2. "Medalist"
3. "Cross Over"
4. "Stand by me"
5. "Drop in the box"
6. "Fairy tale"
7. "Wake me up"
8. "Summer Splash"
9. "Shampoo Bubble"
10. "Backpack"
11. "Summer Madness"
12. "Summer Love Story"
13. "Dear"
14. "Say Good-bye Say Hello"
15. "Virgin Blue"
16. "Funk This Time!"
17. "Bumblebee"
18. "Fall In Love"
19. "Baby what turns you on"
20. "Summer Vacation"
21. "Shizuku ~Sizk~"
  <ENCORE>
22. "Anthem"
23. "Paradise City"
  <BONUS FOOTAGE>
24. "Lead Upturn 2019 ~Sync~" (Behind the Scenes)
25. "MC Collection"

== Charts (Japan) ==
Release	Chart	Peak position	Chart run
December 18, 2019	Oricon DVD/Blu-ray Charts	39	1 week
