= Lead Upturn 2020 Online Live: Trick or Lead with Movies 5 =

Video by Lead
- Released: January 20, 2021
- Recorded: 2020
- Genre: Pop, hip hop
- Label: Pony Canyon; DVD (PCBP-53285); Blu-ray (PCXP-50795)

Lead chronology
Lead Upturn 2019: Sync (2019)	Lead Upturn 2020 Online Live: Trick or Lead with Movies 5 (2021)	Lead Upturn 2021 Online Live: Sonic Boom & GuiDance (2021)

Lead Upturn 2020 Online Live: Trick or Lead with Movies 5 (stylized as 「Lead Upturn 2020 ONLINE LIVE ～Trick or Lead～」with「MOVIES 5」) is the twenty-third and twenty-fourth video and seventeenth overall concert video released by Japanese hip-hop group Lead. The concert video was released on January 20, 2021. It debuted at No. 8 on the Oricon DVD charts and No. 10 on the Blu-ray charts.

The concert was performed without a live audience due to the COVID-19 pandemic in Japan.

== Information ==
Lead Upturn 2020 Online Live ~Trick or Lead~ with Movies 5 is the seventeenth concert video and fifth compilation DVD/Blu-ray released by Lead. It debuted at No. 8 on the Oricon DVD charts and No. 10 on the Blu-ray charts, taking No. 16 and 19, respectively, for the weekly ranking. It became their highest charting concert video, their prior being Lead Upturn 2018: Milestone.

The set was released on DVD and Blu-ray, with preorders including one of three posters on a first-come, first-served basis. It included a sixteen-page booklet and a commemorative ticket.

Lead Upturn 2020 Online Live ~Trick or Lead~ was filmed without the presence of a live audience due to COVID-19, and was filmed on October 30, 2019 at Tokyo Totemono Brillia Hall at the "harevutai" theater, which is a modernized concert hall made for CG lives. It became their first concert to not be filmed at the Nakano Sun Plaza. Due to the concert not corresponding to a particular album, the set list was composed of a variety of songs from various albums and singles, including Now or Never (2012), The Showcase (2016), Milestone (2018) and Singularity (2020).

Movies 5 was their first compilation since in six years. It housed every music video they had released since "Yakusoku" up to "Tuxedo". However, it omitted "Kangoku Rokku" from the latter and "Backpack" from their album Milestone. Bonus material included dance versions of select songs, including "Tokyo Fever", "Summer Vacation" and "Love or Love?".

== Track listing ==
- DVD1: Lead Upturn 2020 Online Live ~Trick or Lead~
1. "Singularity"
2. "Real Live"
3. "Zoom up"
4. "Kokorozashi 〜KO.KO.RO.ZA.SHI.〜"
5. "Stand by me"
6. "Tell Me Why"
7. "Depend On Me"
8. "Masquerade" / "Be the Naked" / "Wake me up"
9. "Funkenstein"
10. "Love or Love?"
11. "Hide and Seek"
12. "Bumblebee"
13. "Loud! Loud! Loud!"
14. "Ride On Music"
15. "Tokyo Fever"
  Encore
16. "Tuxedo"
17. "Yakusoku"
- DVD2: Movies 5
1. "Yakusoku" (Music Video)
2. "Zoom up" (Music Video)
3. "Tokyo Fever" (Music Video)
4. "Beautiful Day (Music Video)
5. "Bumblebee" (Music Video)
6. "Love or Love?" (Music Video)
7. "Be the Naked" (Music Video)
8. "Summer Vacation" (Music Video)
9. "Sunset Refrain" (Music Video)
10. "Hide and Seek" (Music Video)
11. "Tuxedo" (Music Video)
  Bonus Footage
12. "Tokyo Fever" (Dance Focus Music Video)
13. "Shampoo Bubble" (Image Move in Hawaii)
14. "Love or Love?" (Choreography Video)
15. "Bumblebee" (Choreography Video)
16. "Summer Vacation" (Choreography Video)
17. "Tuxedo" (Choreography Video)

== Charts ==
Oricon DVD Charts
Release	Chart	Peak position	Total sales
January 20, 2021	Oricon Daily Chart	8	
January 20, 2021	Oricon Weekly Chart	16	724

Oricon Blu-ray Charts
Release	Chart	Peak position	Total sales
January 20, 2021	Oricon Daily Chart	10	
January 20, 2021	Oricon Weekly Chart	19	950
