= Lead Upturn 2010: I'll Be Around =

Lead Upturn 2010 ～I'll Be Around★～

Video by Lead
- Released: December 8, 2010
- Recorded: 2010
- Genre: Pop, hip-hop
- Label: Flight Master; DVD (PCBP-52055)

Lead chronology
Lead Upturn 2009: Summer Day & Night Fever (2009)	Lead Upturn 2010 ～I'll Be Around★～ (2010)	Lead Dramabox (2011)

Lead Upturn 2010 ~I'll Be Around~ (stylized as Lead Upturn 2010～I'll Be Around★～) is the seventh concert DVD released by the Japanese hip-hop group Lead one year after their previous concert DVD on December 8, 2010. It charted at No. 41 on the Oricon charts, remaining on the charts for one week.

While the tour did not have a corresponding album, most of the songs chosen to be performed were in the dance and electronica genre.

== Information ==
Lead Upturn 2010 ~I'll Be Around~ is the seventh concert DVD released by the Japanese hip-hop group Lead. It was released on December 8, 2010, a year after their previous concert DVD Lead Upturn 2009 ~Summer Day & Night Fever~. It peaked on the Oricon DVD Charts at No. 41, only staying on the charts for one week.

As with their previous Upturn tour, it did not have a corresponding album. For the performances, the group predominantly performed their more upbeat dance and electronica music, including "Speed Star", "GiraGira Romantic", "Virgin Blue" and "Tokio Night", among others.

For the concert, Lead performed several acrobatics, something they had not previously done for lives.

The performance utilized on the DVD was of their performance at the Nakano Sun Plaza in Nakano, Tokyo.

== Track listing ==
(opening)

1. "Hikari"
2. "Tokio Night"
3. "Love Magic"
4. "Love Rain"
5. "Shake Up"
6. "Deep in my heart"
7. "Night Deluxe" (1st dance)
8. "Speechless"
9. "I believe"
10. "Believe in myself"
11. "Taisetsu na Mono"
12. "Boku ga Tsuki ni Inoru Yoru" (2nd dance)
13. "Medley" ~Summer Splash / Field of Soul / Tenohira wo Taiyou ni / Star Playa~
14. "Get Dizzy"
15. "Virgin Blue"
16. "Speed Star" (1st encore)
17. "GiraGira Romantic" (2nd encore)
18. "Thanks for..." (bonus track)
19. "Summer Madness"

== Charts ==
Release	Chart	Peak position
December 8, 2010	Oricon DVD Charts	41
