= 10th Anniversary Tour Lead Upturn 2012: Now or Never =

2012 album by Japanese hip-hop group Lead

10th Anniversary Tour Lead Upturn 2012 ～Now or Never～

Video by Lead
- Released: December 26, 2012
- Recorded: 2012
- Genres: Pop, hip hop
- Labels: Pony Canyon; DVD (PCBP-52108)

Lead chronology
Lead Upturn 2011: Sun x You (2011)	10th Anniversary Tour Lead Upturn 2012 ～Now or Never～ (2012)	Lead Upturn 2013: Leap (2013)

10th Anniversary Tour Lead Upturn 2012 ～Now or Never～ (stylized as 10th Anniversary TOUR Lead Upturn 2012～NOW OR NEVER～) is the tenth anniversary concert DVD released by the Japanese hip-hop group Lead one year after their previous concert DVD on December 26, 2012. It charted at #38 on the Oricon charts, remaining on the charts for one week.

The tour corresponded with their 2012 studio album, Now Or Never, becoming their first tour to have a corresponding album since their 2008 live tour Lead Upturn 2018 ～Feel The Vibes～, which corresponded with the album Feel the Vibes.

== Information ==
10th Anniversary Tour Lead Upturn 2012 ～Now or Never～ is the ninth concert DVD released by the Japanese hip-hop group Lead. The DVD was released one calendar year after their previous concert DVD, Lead Upturn 2011 ～Sun×You～, on December 26, 2018. It charted at #38 on the Oricon DVD Charts, staying for one week.

The tour became their first in four years to correspond with an album, whereas it corresponded with their sixth studio album, Now or Never. The last tour tie-in was their 2008 live tour that corresponding with their Feel the Vibes studio album. The tour for Now Or Never also celebrated the group's tenth anniversary, having debuted in July 2002 with the song "Manatsu no Magic".

Lead Upturn 2012 ～Now or Never～ became the final live tour with member and lead vocalist Hiroki Nakadoi. Hiroki had graduated from the group in March the following year after their Leaders Party 10! performance at Zepp Tokyo in Aomi, Kōtō Ward in Tokyo.

Along with the various songs that spanned across three discs of the album - which included every a-side with some featuring alternate arrangements, and their most popular coupling tracks - other songs performed were "I believe" from Lead! Heat! Beat! (2005), and the songs "Love Rain" and "One For Da Soul" from their debut album Life On Da Beat (2003).

The performance utilized on the DVD was of their July 31, 2012 performance at Nakano Sun Plaza in Nakano, Tokyo.

== Leader Hiroki's graduation ==
10th Anniversary Tour Lead Upturn 2012 ~Now or Never~ became the final Upturn tour leader and lead vocalist Hiroki Nakadoi took part in. After the group ended their tenth anniversary celebration with the Leader's Party 10! concert for their fan club in March 2013, Hiroki stepped away from the group.

Prior to Hiroki making his final decision, the other members, Keita Furuya, Akira Kagimoto and Shinya Tanuichi, had questioned if they should remain as a unit if Hiroki decided to leave. When Hiroki finalized his decision, with full support to the others as a group, they chose to stay together due to the constant support of their fans.

== Track listing ==
1. "Stand and Fight"
2. "Real Live"
3. "Speechless"
4. "Fly Away"
5. "one more side" (dancers 1st performance)
6. "Wanna Be With You"
7. "Stay with me"
8. "Can't get enough"
9. "Voice"
10. "I believe"
11. "Wonder Mirror" (lead dance performance, dancers 2nd performance)
12. "Night Deluxe"
13. "Hungry Sniper"
14. "Boom!! Boom!!"
15. "Color"
16. "Hurricane" (encore)
17. "Summer Special Medley" ～Manatsu no Magic / Love Rain / One For Da Soul / Show me the way～
18. "Virgin Blue" (extra shoot)
19. "Backstage Off-shot" (double encore)
20. "High Tension Day"

== Charts ==
Release	Chart	Peak position
December 26, 2012	Oricon DVD Charts	38
