= Senko hanabi =

Japanese sparkler fireworks

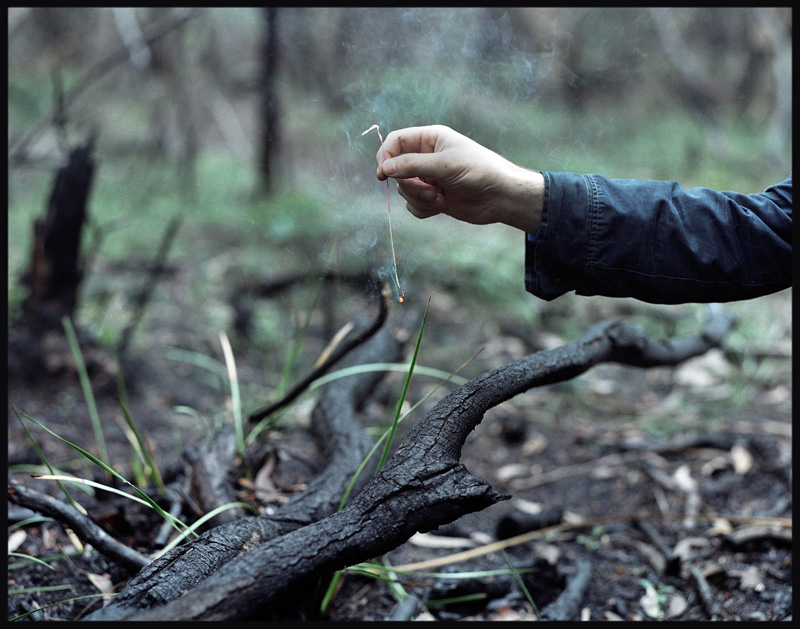
Senko hanabi being held in a hand

Senko hanabi sparkling at night and then dropping when done

Senko hanabi (線香花火, lit. 'incense-stick fireworks') is a traditional Japanese firework and a type of sparkler. It is a thin shaft of twisted tissue paper about 20 centimeters long with one end containing a few grains of black powder. While traditional black powder consists of potassium nitrate, sulfur, and charcoal, traditional senko hanabi substitutes lamp black for charcoal as the source of carbon.

Essays about it date back to at least 1927.

== Names ==
Senko hanabi (線香花火) can be pronounced as senkō hanabi (せんこう はなび) or senko hanabi (せんこ はなび). It is also known as hanabi senkō (花火線香, はなび せんこう).

== Usage ==
To properly ignite a senko hanabi, the pointed end (with black powder) is held straight down and lit, so that the flame is at the bottom. After a few seconds, a glowing, molten slag ball will form. The slag is reportedly potassium sulfide, which also contains carbon from the lamp black. After a while, the molten ball will initiate the second phase of the firework, silently spraying an array of delicate branching sparks with a range of up to 20 centimetres (7.9 in).

It is best ignited away from the wind and held with a steady hand, so that the delicate molten ball does not drop and that the two phases can be fully completed.

== Principle ==
One theory for its distinctive sparks suggest that when lit, firstly the gunpowder burns and later form a blob of molten slag containing potassium sulfide, potassium carbonate. These chemicals further react and decompose into gases like carbon monoxide, carbon dioxide, sulfur dioxide. These gases erupt out of the molten blob and carry small amounts of slag in the process. These fragments further divide into minuscule bits due to wind, thus creating this effect.

== Culture ==
Senko hanabi are included in packets of fireworks and are ignited last amongst other fireworks.

The fireworks are said to somehow hypnotize the watcher into silence and to evoke mono no aware (translated as "an empathy toward things", or "a sensitivity to ephemera"), a Japanese term describing a flash of sadness felt when reminded of the beauty and briefness of life. "The poignantly ephemeral has long been appreciated in Japan and is still felt in the quiet celebration of senko hanabi."
