= Vincent DeGiorgio =

Canadian songwriter

Vincent "Vince" DeGiorgio (born in Brampton, Ontario) is a Canadian DJ, record producer, music publisher and songwriter.

His work includes writing and co-producing hit albums for Caro Emerald, whose debut album Deleted Scenes from the Cutting Room Floor spent 30 weeks in the #1 spot on the Dutch Top 100. DeGiorgio also wrote songs for Taiwanese singer Joanna Wang, who sings largely in English and is referred to as "Taiwan's Norah Jones"; her first album sold more than 10,000 copies in the first ten days of release.

He is the founder of Power Records (the oldest dance music label in English speaking Canada), Boulevard Records and Chateau Records. 'The label specialized in Hi-NRG music, and released the work of Man 2 Man and several albums by Tapps.

The trio Tapps (sometimes written T.A.P.P.S. - an acronym for the first letter of the original performers names: Tony DaCosta, Allan Coelho and Paul Silva - adding the extra "p" and "s" for effect. Vocalist Candy Berthiaume joined the group after the name had stuck) scored a major disco hit in 1983 with their Power Records produced single "My Forbidden Lover", co-written by DeGiorgio.

== Career ==
Vince DeGiorgio began his music career as an import record buyer for a Sam the Record Man outlet in his hometown of Brampton, Ontario. He then moved on to retail record store Disco Sound of Canada in Toronto, Ontario where his close ties to the dance music community began and his most notable DJ gig at after hours nightclub Le Tube.

DeGiorgio moved from his own label to a position as dance music and marketing consultant at BMG Music Canada - the first step in his "corporate music" career. DeGiorgio was International A&R VP at RCA in New York from 1997 to 2002. DeGiorgio was responsible for signing famous boy band NSYNC in the US. He is a member of the board of directors of the Songwriters Association of Canada (producer of the "Songworks" songwriting camps), serves on the advisory board of MROC (Musicians' Rights Organization of Canada) and is the outgoing chair of the Juno Awards dance music committee.

DeGiorgio currently owns and manages Chapter 2 Productions which also houses Cymba Music Publishing (an acronym for "Crushing Your Music Business Apathy"), C2 it Music Publishing, The Billy Ray Louis Music Publishing Company, DVP (a joint venture pop music label) and dance imprints Power Records and Boulevard Records Inc. Chapter 2 Productions Inc. has furnished music for over 150 international and domestic television programmes including "Smart Cookies","Pure Design" and the award-winning "Make Some Noise", "America's Next Top Model", "Da Kink In My Hair", "Degrassi" and "Keeping Up With The Kardashians". It has also had songs in its catalogue appear in major motion pictures such as "Something Borrowed" and in trailers for "The Fantastic Mr. Fox". The newest projects completed include placements in the ABC TV show "Army Wives", made for TV films "The Trainer", an advertisement for Reebok's "Easy Tone" shoes in Japan and Russia and the CBC TV show "Mr. D". Besides DeGiorgio, Chapter 2's writing team includes Aileen de la Cruz, Ava Kay, John Acosta and Davor Vulama.

In September 2016, DeGiorgio was elected President of The Canadian Music Publishers Association (CMPA). He is also co-chair of Canada Music Week (CMW), 2017 committee.
