= The Showcase (album) =

Studio album by Lead
- Released: June 8, 2016
- Recorded: 2012–2016
- Genre: Hip hop, pop, R&B, dance
- Label: Pony Canyon

Lead chronology
Now or Never (2012)	The Showcase (2016)	Milestone (2018)

Singles from The Showcase
- 1. "Still" Released: December 12, 2012; 2. "Upturn" Released: June 19, 2013; 3. "Green Days" Released: September 18, 2013; 4. "Sakura" Released: February 26, 2014; 5. "Omoide Breaker" Released: September 17, 2014; 6. "My One" Released: March 4, 2015; 7. "Yakusoku" Released: November 25, 2015

The Showcase is the seventh studio album by the Japanese hip-hop group Lead on June 8, 2016, four years after their last album Now or Never. The album became their highest ranking album since their debut, peaking at #2 on the Oricon charts and remaining on the charts for five weeks. The album consisted of seven preceding singles, the first being "Still" in December 2012 and the last being "Yakusoku", released three years later on November 25, 2015.

The album was released in four different editions, each carrying different material. It came as a standard CD, a limited edition CD, a CD+DVD combination and a CD rendition that came with a booklet. To promote The Showcase, the group held both pre-release concerts and release concerts. The pre-release lives were held from April 24, 2016 to May 21, 2016, and the release lives were held between June 7, 2016 to July 10, 2016.

It was their first album released as a trio, whereas lead vocalist, Hiroki Nakadoi, resigned from the group due to feelings of inadequacy after they released their twentieth single Still.

== Information ==
The Showcase became their most successful on the charts, peaking at number 2 on the Oricon Albums Charts and remaining on the charts for five consecutive weeks. The singles released prior to the album all charted in the top five on the Oricon Singles Charts, giving them their first string of top releases since their career began in 2002.

Prior to the album's release, seven preluding singles were released over the course of three years, beginning with "Still" on December 12, 2012. The single would be the final single released with lead vocalist Hiroki Nakadoi, whereas he departed after the group's tenth anniversary due to feeling inadequate compared to the other members. Their final single before the album was "Yakusoku", released on November 25, 2015.

The album was released in four separate editions: a standard CD containing fifteen musical tracks; a limited 2CD first press edition that came with remixes of "Night Deluxe" and "Virgin Blue"; a CD+DVD combination containing the making of Lead hosting the radio show Mokudan on the DVD, along with music videos to select songs; and a CD that came with a multi-paged booklet.

Working with the album's concept of a showcase, the group decided on the track listing's order based on how they would perform them live.

The song "Zoom up" (track #3) was written and composed by members of the musical production company Rebrast: Shogo, Xelik, Kodaka Kotaro and Hirotaka Hayakawa (who goes by SigN). Track 11, "Kokorozashi ~KO.KO.RO.ZA.SHI.~", was also produced by members of Rebrast, this time being shogo and Rush Eye.

To help promote the album, Lead held several pre-release venues and several post-release performances and venues. The pre-release venues, which were called Pre☆Party!, mainly consisted of opportunities for fans to meet the artists through a series of photo shoots and table meetings. At some of the events, the trio held mini lives, performing a select set of songs from the album. The post-release venues, called Release☆Party!, were predominately mini lives with photo sessions.

== Background and composition ==
While determining the order of the track list, the group had chosen to place the songs in the order they would sound best during performances.

"Still" was written by Canadian DJ and record producer Vincent DeGiorgio, and Swedish songwriter Anderz Wrethov, with the lyrics written by the members of Lead. The music was performed by Seiji Motoyama. Vincent has worked in the music industry since the 1980s and has worked with many well-known artists, including Hikaru Utada, Petula Clark and Caro Emerald. Anderz Wrethov, who goes by his stage name "Wrethov", began his career in 1999 and has worked with the likes of Arashi, KAT-TUN and Super Junior. "Upturn" was also written by Vincent DeGiorgio, and Swedish songwriter Johan Röhr, with the lyrics written by the members of Lead.

The lyrics to "Sakura" were written by AnDiSM, while the composition and arrangement was performed by musical composer YUKIYOSHI. AnDiSM also worked on the song "Yakusoku", along with nishi-ken. While AnDiSM had written most of the lyrics, Shinya wrote the rap portion. "Omoide Breaker" was written and composed by musical composer Satori Shiraishi, while the music was performed by Nao Harada. Satori is best known for his works with the Japanese female rock band Cyntia. "My One" was written and composed by SHIBU, who has also worked with the likes of E-girls and Se7en.

The song "Zoom Up" was written and composed by members of the musical production company Rebrast: Shogo, Xelik, Kodaka Kotaro and Hirotaka Hayakawa (who goes by SigN). "Kokorozashi ~KO.KO.RO.ZA.SHI.~", was also produced by members of Rebrast, this time being shogo and Rush Eye.

== Hiroki's departure ==
After receiving the opportunity to debut at the age of 17, the past 10 and a half years I spent as a member of Lead was a wonderful time beyond words. I was able to get here thanks to the support of many people, and I was also able to experience things that not everyone can experience, something irreplaceable in my life. . . . Because of you all, I have been able to come this far.

— Nakadoi Hiroki, To Everyone

After Lead celebrated their tenth anniversary with the Leader's Party 10! concert for their fan club in March 2013, vocalist Hiroki Nakadoi stepped away from the group. His final single release with Lead was for their single Still, which had been released on December 12, 2012, and his departure was in April the following year.

Hiroki began to discuss his feelings about leaving to the other members prior to his departure, explaining how he felt that they had surpassed him since they debuted in 2002 with "Manatsu no Magic"; however, due to their reassurance and saying that they would all "do their best together," he had decided to stay on, putting more effort into his overall performance. Despite this, he fell into a depression, believing that he was unable to "catch up" to his friends' level and began talking about wanting to leave again. He said how he felt that, due to him still not having any self-confidence, he "shouldn't be with the members who are aiming higher and . . . relying on the kindness of the staff members . . . and the Leaders (their fans)."

Prior to Hiroki making his final decision, the other members, Keita Furuya, Akira Kagimoto and Shinya Tanuichi, had questioned if they should remain as a unit if Hiroki decided to leave. When Hiroki finalized his decision, with full support to the others as a group, they chose to stay together due to the constant support of their fans.

It is such a big thing that our leader is graduating, but we, the three of us, will continue holding up Lead's motto "Stand and Fight," and keep on going as Lead with our full effort, in order to see an even more vivid future with you Leaders.

— Shinya Tanuichi, Keita Furuya, Akira Kagimoto

== Music videos ==
Although several singles were released prior to the album's release, the only music video to make it to the CD+DVD edition of the album was their song "Yakusoku" from the single of the same name.

The album did contain one new music video, however, for the song "Zoom Up". The video focused heavily on Lead's breakdancing skills, though the song was not a hip-hop track and, instead, was an uptempo electropop song. Keeping in line with the heavier sound, the video opens with strobe lights as each member is introduced. The sets for the video were of a stage surrounded by fog, a room filled with white curtains and each member encased in a glass cube.

The dance version of the video showed only the stage with the back lights.

On January 29, 2016, Lead's official YouTube uploaded the full video as a way to help promote the album, which was released a few months later in June.

== Track listing ==
Disc 1
No.	Title	Lyrics	Music	Arranger(s)	Length
1.	"Loud! Loud! Loud!"	Furuya Keita • Shinya Tanuichi	Drew Ryan Scott • Sean Alexander • Darren "Baby Dee Beats" Smith	Drew Ryan Scott • Sean Alexander • Darren "Baby Dee Beats" Smith	3:07
2.	"Let's Get on It"	7chi子♪ • John Acosta • Shinya Tanuichi	John Acosta	John Acosta	2:59
3.	"Zoom Up"	shogo	SigN • XELIK • Kodaka Kotaro • Cage	Xelik • SigN	4:01
4.	"Stand by Me"	Shinya Tanuichi	Airship	Airship	3:20
5.	"Still"	Lead	Vincent DeGiorgio • Wrethov • Denniz Jamm	Seiji Motoyama	3:40
6.	"My One"	SHIBU	SHIBU	Yōsuke Yamashita	4:43
7.	"Amazing"	Akira Kagimoto • Shinya Tanuichi	Akira Kagimoto	Yosuke Yamashita	5:28
8.	"Sakura"	AnDiSM	YUKIYOSHI	YUKIYOSHI	4:05
9.	"Yakusoku"	AnDiSM (Diosta inc.) • Shinya Tanuichi	nishi-ken (Diosta inc.)	nishi-ken (Diosta inc.)	3:48
10.	"Game"	MEG.ME	Andreas Öberg • Erik Lidbom • Jimmy Burney	Erik Lidbom	3:55
11.	"Kokorozashi (Ko.Ko.Ro.Za.Shi.)" (志 / Will)	shogo	RUSH EYE	RUSH EYE	3:01
12.	"Omoide Breaker"	Satori Shiraishi	Satori Shiraishi	Nao Harada	4:31
13.	"Green Days"	AnDiSM	AnDiSM	MEG.ME	4:06
14.	"Stand Up Action"	Genki Mizuno	RON	RON	3:51
15.	"Upturn"	Keita Furuya • Shinya Taniuchi	Vincent DeGiorgio • Johan Rohr	Seiji Motoyama	4:38
Total length:					59:13

Disc 2
No.	Title	Lyrics	Music	Arranger(s)	Length
1.	"Mokudan SP Lead The Showcase Radio (Thanks to FM Yokohama 84.7 "Boys Party On Thursday")" (モクダン / 「木曜日の男子会」)				1:04:01
2.	"Night Deluxe" (remix)	Shoko Fujibayashi	Daisuke "D.I" Imai	KAZ	4:01
3.	"Virgin Blue" (remix)	Sagara Yoshiaki	Kisaburo Suzuki	KAZ	3:38
Total length:					1:11:40

DVD
No.	Title	Length
1.	"Yakusoku" (music video)	4:38
2.	"Zoom Up" (music video)	3:58
3.	"Zoom Up" (dance version; music video)	3:57
4.	"Mokudan SP Lead the Showcase Radio" (making video)	8:42
5.	"The Showcase" (jacket making video)	13:26
6.	"Zoom Up" (making video)	9:33
Total length:		44:14

== Special release events ==
7th album "The Showcase" Release Events

- Pre Party!
1. April 24, 2016: The Mall Sendai Nagamachi 2F Ikoi Square
2. April 30, 2016: Odawara Dynacity West 1F Canyon Stage
3. May 3, 2016: Asunal Kanayama Plaza
4. May 4, 2016: JR Hakata City 3F Studio Terrace
5. May 5, 2016: Hiroshima Station South Exit Basement Square
6. May 15, 2016: Diver City Tokyo Plaza 2F Festival Square
7. May 21, 2016: Morinomiya Q's Mall Base 1F Base Park
- Release Party!
1. June 7, 2016: Tokyo Dome City LaQua Garden Stage
2. June 8, 2016: Abeno Cues Town 3F Sky Court
3. June 9, 2016: Asunal Kanayama Plaza
4. June 10, 2016: Canal City Hakata B1 Sun Plaza Stage
5. June 11, 2016: LaLaport Tokyo Bay North Building 1F Central Square
6. June 12, 2016: Cocoon City Cocoon 2 Cocoon Hiroba
7. June 18, 2016: Sapporo Factory Atrium Special Stage
8. June 19, 2016: Tobu Department Store Ikebukuro 8F Roof "Sky Deck Square"
9. July 10, 2016: New Pier Hall

== Charts ==
Release	Chart	Peak position
June 8, 2016	Oricon Daily Albums Chart	2
June 8, 2016	Oricon Weekly Albums Chart	8
