= Omoide Breaker =

Single by Lead

from the album The Showcase
- B-side: "Summer Love Story"; "Kimi to Aruku Mirai" (Type A); "Fairy Tale" (Type B); "Senkō Hanabi" (Type C)
- Released: September 17, 2014
- Recorded: 2014
- Genre: J-pop; hip hop
- Label: Pony Canyon
- Songwriters: Satori Shiraishi; Nao Harada; AnDisM; Katsuya Kawazoe; Shinya Tanuichi; Akira Kagimoto; Keita Furuya; Inoue Tomonori; Akiyuki Tateyama

Lead singles chronology
"Sakura" (2014)	"Omoide Breaker" (2014)	"My One" (2015)

"Omoide Breaker" (想い出ブレイカー / "Memory Breaker") is the twenty-fourth single by the Japanese hip-hop group Lead, released on September 17, 2014. The single peaked on the Oricon charts at number 4 and remained on the charts for four weeks.

The single was released as a standard CD, along with three limited edition, two of which were CD+DVD combos, each carrying different content. While every edition contained the B-side "Summer Love Story", each edition harbored a bonus track. The CD+DVD editions not only contained differing content on the CD portions, but also harbored different content on the DVDs.

== Information ==
"Omoide Breaker", released in September 2014, was Lead's second single of the year, their previous being "Sakura" in February. The single continued their string of top-five charting singles, which began with "Wanna Be with You" in March 2012, taking the number 4 position for the weekly ranking on the Oricon Singles Chart, and remained on the chart for four consecutive weeks.

The single was released in four different editions; a standard CD, two limited edition CD+DVD combo packs, and a limited CD-only edition. The standard CD contained the title track, the coupling track "Summer Love Story" – which was available on every edition – and the songs' instrumentals. The type A CD+DVD edition harbored the two tracks, the bonus track "Kimi to Aruku Mirai" (君と歩く未来 / "Walking to the Future with You") and the corresponding instrumentals. The DVD portion housed the music video for "Omoide Breaker" and the making video off-shot. The type B CD+DVD edition contained the bonus track "Fairy tale" on the CD, while housing a dance version of "Omoide Breaker" on the DVD, along with an interview with the members of Lead. The limited CD only versions contained the bonus track "Senkō Hanabi" (線香花火 / "Sparkler"), along with all the songs' instrumentals.

"Omoide Breaker" was written and composed by musical composer Satori Shiraishi, while the music was performed by Nao Harada. Satori is best known for his works with the Japanese female rock band Cyntia. "Summer Love Story" was written and composed by AnDisM, who had composed most of the music for their previous single "Sakura". The track "Fairy Tale" was written and composed by Lead's very own Akira Kagimoto. The lyrics were written by J-Bright with Lead's Shinya Tanuichi writing the rap portion. The track "Senkou Hanabi" was composed by Akiyuki Tateyama and performed by Inoue Tomonori from the Japanese band Taynton. The lyrics were written by Lead's Keita Furuya, who became the lead vocalist after the departure of Hiroki Nakadoi.

== Packaging ==
"Omoide Breaker" was released in four separate editions: a standard CD, two limited edition CD+DVD combo packs, and a limited CD-only edition.

The standard CD contained the title track "Omoide Breaker", the coupling track "Summer Love Story" – which was available on every edition – and the corresponding instrumentals. The type A CD+DVD edition harbored the two tracks, the bonus track "Kimi to Aruku Mirai" and the corresponding instrumentals. The DVD portion housed the music video for "Omoide Breaker" and the making video off-shot.

The type B CD+DVD edition contained the bonus track "Fairy Tale" on the CD, while housing a dance version of "Omoide Breaker" on the DVD, along with an interview with the members of Lead. The limited CD only versions contained the bonus track "Senkō Hanabi" (線香花火 / "Sparkler"), along with all the songs' corresponding instrumentals. Senkō hanabi is a type of Japanese firework, which is typically used for celebrations.

== Track listing ==
CD track listing
No.	Title	Lyrics	Music	Arranger(s)	Length
1.	"Omoide Breaker" (想い出ブレイカー / Memory Breaker)	Satori Shiraishi	Nao Harada	Satori Shiraishi	4:32
2.	"Summer Love Story"	AnDisM	AnDisM	AnDisM	5:12
3.	"Omoide Breaker" (instrumental)		Nao Harada	Satori Shiraishi	4:32
4.	"Summer Love Story" (instrumental)		AnDisM	AnDisM	5:09

CD (Type A) track listing
No.	Title	Lyrics	Music	Arranger(s)	Length
1.	"Omoide Breaker"	Satori Shiraishi	Nao Harada	Satori Shiraishi	4:32
2.	"Summer Love Story"	AnDisM	AnDisM	AnDisM	5:12
3.	"Kimi to Aruku Mirai" (君と歩く未来 / "Walking the Future With You")	Shinya Tanuichi	Katsuya Kawazoe	Katsuya Kawazoe	4:02
4.	"Omoide Breaker" (instrumental)		Nao Harada	Satori Shiraishi	4:32
5.	"Summer Love Story" (instrumental)		AnDisM	AnDisM	5:09
6.	"Kimi to Aruku Mirai" (instrumental)		Katsuya Kawazoe	Katsuya Kawazoe	4:00

CD (Type B) track listing
No.	Title	Lyrics	Music	Arranger(s)	Length
1.	"Omoide Breaker"	Satori Shiraishi	Nao Harada	Satori Shiraishi	4:32
2.	"Summer Love Story"	AnDisM	AnDisM	AnDisM	5:12
3.	"Fairy Tale"	J-Bright; Shinya Tanuichi (rap)	Akira Kagimoto	Akira Kagimoto	4:49
4.	"Omoide Breaker" (instrumental)		Nao Harada	Satori Shiraishi	4:32
5.	"Summer Love Story" (instrumental)		AnDisM	AnDisM	5:09
6.	"Fairy Tale" (instrumental)		Akira Kagimoto	Akira Kagimoto	4:46

CD (Type C) track listing
No.	Title	Lyrics	Music	Arranger(s)	Length
1.	"Omoide Breaker"	Satori Shiraishi	Nao Harada	Satori Shiraishi	4:32
2.	"Summer Love Story"	AnDisM	AnDisM	AnDisM	5:12
3.	"Senkō Hanabi" (線香花火 / "Sparkler")	Keita Furuya	Inoue Tomonori	Akiyuki Tateyama	4:45
4.	"Omoide Breaker" (instrumental)		Nao Harada	Satori Shiraishi	4:32
5.	"Summer Love Story" (instrumental)		AnDisM	AnDisM	5:09
6.	"Senkō Hanabi" (instrumental)		Inoue Tomonori	Akiyuki Tateyama	4:42

DVD (Type A) track listing
No.	Title	Length
1.	"Omoide Breaker" (music video)
2.	"Omoide Breaker" (music video off-shot)

DVD (Type B) track listing
No.	Title	Length
1.	"Omoide Breaker" (dance ver.; music video)
2.	"Making & Interview"

== Charts ==
Release	Chart	Peak position
September 17, 2014	Oricon Weekly Singles Chart	4
