= My One (song) =

Single by Lead

from the album The Showcase
- B-side: "It's My Style"; "Until..." (Type A); "Super Disco" (Type B); "Change Myself" (Type C)
- Released: March 4, 2015
- Recorded: 2015
- Genre: J-pop; hip hop
- Label: Pony Canyon

Lead singles chronology
"Omoide Breaker" (2014)	"My One" (2015)	"Yakusoku" (2015)

"My One" is the twenty-fifth single by the Japanese hip-hop group Lead, becoming their first release of 2015 on March 4, 2015. The single continued their string of top releases, peaking at number 6 on Oricon and remaining on the chart for three weeks.

The single was released as a standard CD and three limited edition versions, two of which were CD+DVD combos, each carrying different content. While all editions contained the b-side "It's My Style", each of the limited editions containing differing bonus tracks. The CD+DVD editions not only included different content on the CD portions, but also carried different content on the DVD portions.

== Information ==
"My One" continued Lead's string of top-charting singles on the Oricon Singles Chart, which began with "Wanna Be with You" in 2012, taking the number 6 position for the week and remaining on the chart for three consecutive weeks.

The single was released in four editions, a standard CD, a limited edition CD and two limited edition CD+DVD combo packs. The regular edition contained the title track, the coupling track "It's My Style" – which was available on all versions – and their corresponding instrumentals. The limited type A CD+DVD version harbored the two tracks, the bonus track "Until..." and the accompanying instrumentals. The DVD portion housed the music video for "My One" and the off-shot making video. The limited type B CD+DVD editions contained the two regular tracks and the bonus track "Super Disco" (スーパーディスコ / "Sūpā Disuko"), along with their instrumentals. The DVD portion contained the dance version of "My One" and the behind-the-scenes footage of the photo shoot for the different single covers. The limited Type C version contained the two standard tracks, the bonus track "Change Myself" and the songs' corresponding instrumentals.

"My One" was written and composed by musical composer Shibu, who has also worked with the likes of E-girls and Se7en, and would continued to work with Lead for their following album, The Showcase. "It's My Style" was written and composed by AnDiSM, who had worked with Lead in the past and would continue to work with the group in the future. "Until..." was written and composed by Lead's youngest member Akira Kagimoto, while Show (Digz Inc.) wrote the lyrical portion. "Super Disco" was written and composed by Japanese musical group 220VOLT (not to be confused with the Swedish band of the same name) members Mirror BOY, D.ham, Yang Whan and Moon Hanmiru. The lyrics were written by Lead's lead vocalist Keita Furuya. "Change Myself" was written and composed by the group's main rapper Shinya Tanuichi, and Goro Kumai, the latter who has worked with famous Japanese rapper Verbal. The lyrical portion was written by Ito Shuhei and LUG.

== Packaging ==
"My One" was released in four editions: a standard CD, two limited editions CD+DVD combo packs and a limited CD only edition.

The regular edition contained the title track, the coupling track "It's My Style" – which was available on all versions – and their corresponding instrumentals. The limited type A CD+DVD version harbored the two tracks, the bonus track "Until..." and the accompanying instrumentals. The DVD portion housed the music video for "My One" and the off-shot making video.

The limited type B CD+DVD editions contained the two regular tracks and the bonus track "Super Disco", along with their instrumentals. The DVD portion contained the dance version of "My One" and the behind-the-scenes footage of the photo shoot for the different single covers. Type C versions contained the two standard tracks, the bonus track "Change myself" and the songs' corresponding instrumentals.

== Track listing ==
CD track listing
No.	Title	Lyrics	Music	Length
1.	"My One"	Shibu	Shibu
2.	"It's My Style"	AnDiSM	AnDiSM
3.	"My One" (instrumental)		Shibu
4.	"It's My Style" (instrumental)		AnDiSM

CD (Type A) track listing
No.	Title	Lyrics	Music	Length
1.	"My One"	Shibu	Shibu
2.	"It's My Style"	AnDiSM	AnDiSM
3.	"Until..."	Show (Digz Inc.)	Akira Kagimoto
4.	"My One" (instrumental)		Shibu
5.	"It's My Style" (instrumental)		AnDiSM
6.	"Until..." (instrumental)		Akira Kagimoto

DVD (Type A) track listing
No.	Title	Length
1.	"My One" (music video)
2.	"My One" (making video off-shot)

CD (Type B) track listing
No.	Title	Lyrics	Music	Length
1.	"My One"	Shibu	Shibu
2.	"It's My Style"	AnDiSM	AnDiSM
3.	"Super Disco" (スーパーディスコ / "Sūpā Disuko")	Keita Furuya	220Volt
4.	"My One" (instrumental)		Shibu
5.	"It's My Style" (instrumental)		AnDiSM
6.	"Super Disco" (instrumental)		220Volt

DVD (Type B) track listing
No.	Title	Length
1.	"My One" (dance version; music video)
2.	"My One" (jacket making video)

CD (Type C) track listing
No.	Title	Lyrics	Music	Length
1.	"My One"	Shibu	Shibu
2.	"It's My Style"	AnDiSM	AnDiSM
3.	"Change Myself"	Lug; Ito Shuhei	Shinya Tanuichi; Goro Kumai
4.	"My One" (instrumental)		Shibu
5.	"It's My Style" (instrumental)		AnDiSM
6.	"Change Myself" (instrumental)		Shinya Tanuichi; Goro Kumai

== Charts ==
Release	Chart	Peak position
March 4, 2015	Oricon Weekly Singles Chart	6
