= Still (Lead song) =

Single by Lead

from the album The Showcase
- B-side: "Fuyuiro Girl"; "Ordinary" (Jacket B); "Anytime" (Jacket C); "Masquerade" (Jacket D)
- Released: December 12, 2012
- Recorded: 2012
- Genre: J-pop, hip hop
- Label: Pony Canyon

Lead singles chronology
"Wanna Be with You" (2012)	"Still" (2012)	"Upturn" (2013)

"Still" is the twentieth single by Japanese hip-hop group Lead, released on December 12, 2012, and first to bring in their new era for The Showcase album. The single took the #4 position on the Oricon weekly singles chart and remained on the chart for two weeks.

The single was released in four formats: a standard CD, a limited CD+DVD edition and three limited edition CD versions. Each of the limited editions contained a different B-side, and each version harbored a different back cover.

"Still" became their last single with group leader and lead vocalist Hiroki Nakadoi, whereas he left the group shortly after due to feelings of inadequacy.

== Information ==
"Still" is Lead's first single to be released after their seventh studio album Now or Never, which had been released five months prior in July. The single performed well on the Oricon Singles Charts, where it held the #4 position for the week, remaining on the charts for two consecutive weeks. This became their second single in a row to chart in the top five, "Wanna Be with You" ranked at #3, making it a first since their debut in 2002.

The single was released in five editions, a standard CD and four limited editions that corresponded to each member, each with differing content. The standard edition carried the title track and the B-side "Fuyuiro Girl" (冬色ガール / "Winter Colored Girl"), along with their corresponding instrumentals. Jacket A, which corresponded with Hiroki, carried the two tracks, along with the music video for "Still". Jacket B, corresponding with Shinya, carried the song "Ordinary"; Jacket C corresponded with Keita and held the song "anytime"; Jacket D corresponded with Akira and featured the track "Masquerade".

"Still" was written by Canadian DJ and record producer Vincent DeGiorgio, and Swedish songwriter Anderz Wrethov, with the lyrics written by the members of Lead. The music was performed by Seiji Motoyama. The B-side "Fuyuiro Girl" was written and composed by musical composer Kenji Tokuda. "Masquerade", which was on Akira's corresponding edition Jacket D, was written by composers Danny Schofield, Matthew Tishler and Robyn Newman. The music for the piece was performed by DJ Blackout. The lyrics were done by 7chi子♪.

== Background and composition ==
The title track "Still" was written by Canadian DJ and record producer Vincent DeGiorgio, and Swedish songwriter Anderz Wrethov, with the lyrics written by the members of Lead. The music was performed by Seiji Motoyama. Vincent has worked in the music industry since the 1980s and has worked with many well-known artists, including Hikaru Utada, Petula Clark and Caro Emerald. Anderz Wrethov, who goes by his stage name "Wrethov", began his career in 1999 and has worked with the likes of Arashi, KAT-TUN and Super Junior.

The B-side "Fuyuiro Girl" was written and composed by musical composer Kenji Tokuda. "Masquerade", which was on Akira's corresponding edition Jacket D, was written by composers Danny Schofield, Matthew Tishler and Robyn Newman. The music for the piece was performed by DJ Blackout. Robyn Newman had previously worked with Japanese artist Crystal Kay for her song "I'll Be There" from her Spin the Music album. The lyrics were done by 7chi子♪.

== Hiroki's departure ==
After receiving the opportunity to debut at the age of 17, the past 10 and a half years I spent as a member of Lead was a wonderful time beyond words. I was able to get here thanks to the support of many people, and I was also able to experience things that not everyone can experience, something irreplaceable in my life. . . . Because of you all, I have been able to come this far.

— Nakadoi Hiroki, To Everyone

After Lead celebrated their tenth anniversary with the Leader's Party 10! concert for their fan club in March 2013, vocalist Hiroki Nakadoi stepped away from the group. His final single release with Lead was for their single "Still", which had been released on December 12, 2012, and his departure was in April the following year.

Hiroki began to discuss his feelings about leaving to the other members prior to his departure, explaining how he felt that they had surpassed him since they debuted in 2002 with "Manatsu no Magic"; however, due to their reassurance and saying that they would all "do their best together", he had decided to stay on, putting more effort into his overall performance. Despite this, he fell into a depression, believing that he was unable to "catch up" to his friends' level and began talking about wanting to leave again. He said how he felt that, due to him still not having any self-confidence, he "shouldn't be with the members who are aiming higher and . . . relying on the kindness of the staff members . . . and the Leaders (their fans)".

Prior to Hiroki making his final decision, the other members, Keita Furuya, Akira Kagimoto and Shinya Tanuichi, had questioned if they should remain as a unit if Hiroki decided to leave. When Hiroki finalized his decision, with full support to the others as a group, they chose to stay together due to the constant support of their fans.

It is such a big thing that our leader is graduating, but we, the three of us, will continue holding up Lead's motto "Stand and Fight", and keep on going as Lead with our full effort, in order to see an even more vivid future with you Leaders.

— Shinya Tanuichi, Keita Furuya, Akira Kagimoto

== Track listing ==
CD
No.	Title	Lyrics	Music	Arranger(s)	Length
1.	"Still"	Lead	Seiji Motoyama	Vincent Degiorgio • Anderz Wrethov
2.	"Fuyuiro Girl" (冬色ガール / Winter Colored Girl)	Kenji Tokuda	Kenji Tokuda	Kenji Tokuda
3.	"Still" (instrumental)		Seiji Motoyama	Vincent Degiorgio • Wrethov
4.	"Fuyuiro Girl" (instrumental)		Kenji Tokuda	Kenji Tokuda

DVD
No.	Title	Length
1.	"Still" (music video)
2.	"Still" (making video)

Jacket B
No.	Title	Lyrics	Music	Arranger(s)	Length
1.	"Still"	Lead	Seiji Motoyama	Vincent Degiorgio • Anderz Wrethov
2.	"Fuyuiro Girl" (冬色ガール / Winter Colored Girl)	Kenji Tokuda	Kenji Tokuda	Kenji Tokuda
3.	"Ordinary"	LMPSH	Nayan Williams	Vincent DeGiorgio • Derek Brin
4.	"Still" (instrumental)		Seiji Motoyama	Vincent Degiorgio • Wrethov
5.	"Fuyuiro Girl" (instrumental)		Kenji Tokuda	Kenji Tokuda
6.	"Ordinary" (instrumental)		Nayan Williams	Vincent DeGiorgio • Derek Brin

Jacket C
No.	Title	Lyrics	Music	Arranger(s)	Length
1.	"Still"	Lead	Seiji Motoyama	Vincent Degiorgio • Anderz Wrethov
2.	"Fuyuiro Girl" (冬色ガール / Winter Colored Girl)	Kenji Tokuda	Kenji Tokuda	Kenji Tokuda
3.	"Anytime"	AnDisM	AnDisM	AnDisM
4.	"Still" (instrumental)		Seiji Motoyama	Vincent Degiorgio • Wrethov
5.	"Fuyuiro Girl" (instrumental)		Kenji Tokuda	Kenji Tokuda
6.	"Anytime" (instrumental)			AnDisM	AnDisM

Jacket D
No.	Title	Lyrics	Music	Arranger(s)	Length
1.	"Still"	Lead	Seiji Motoyama	Vincent Degiorgio • Anderz Wrethov
2.	"Fuyuiro Girl" (冬色ガール / Winter Colored Girl)	Kenji Tokuda	Kenji Tokuda	Kenji Tokuda
3.	"Masquerade"	7chi子♪	Danny Schofield • Matthew Tishler • Robyn Newman • DJ Blackout	Danny Schofield • Matthew Tishler • Robyn Newman
4.	"Still" (instrumental)		Seiji Motoyama	Vincent Degiorgio • Wrethov
5.	"Fuyuiro Girl" (instrumental)		Kenji Tokuda	Kenji Tokuda
6.	"Masquerade" (instrumental)		Danny Schofield • Matthew Tishler • Robyn Newman • DJ Blackout	Danny Schofield • Matthew Tishler • Robyn Newman

== Charts ==
Release	Chart	Peak position
December 12, 2012	Oricon Weekly Singles Chart	4
