= Brand New Era =

Studio album by Lead
- Released: August 25, 2004
- Recorded: 2003–2004
- Genre: Hip hop, pop
- Label: Flight Master

Lead chronology
Life on da Beat (2003)	Brand New Era (2004)	Lead! Heat! Beat! (2005)

Singles from Brand New Era
- 1. "Funky Days!" Released: July 30, 2003; 2. "Get Wild Life" Released: December 3, 2003; 3. "Night Deluxe" Released: June 16, 2004

Brand New Era (stylized as BRAИD ИEW ERA) is the second studio album by Japanese hip-hop group Lead on August 25, 2004. The album charted at No. 11 on the Oricon charts and remained on the charts for three weeks. Bonuses with the album included one of four possible posters, a remix of their song "Night Deluxe" and a specialized URL to allow buyers to download original wallpapers.

The album was preluded by three singles: Funky Days!, Get Wild Life and Night Deluxe.

== Information ==
Brand New Era is the second studio album by Japanese hip-hop group Lead. While the album did not chart as well as their debut album, Life On Da Beat, it charted fairly high on the Oricon Albums Charts, ranking at No. 11 and remaining on the charts for three consecutive weeks. On the popular Japanese music site HMV, the album garnered a five star ranking.

The album was only released as a standard CD, not carrying a CD+DVD combo. Instead, the corresponding music videos for the singles released for the album were released on Lead Movies 2, which was released both on DVD and VHS on March 2, 2005. Lead Movies 2 carried the music videos for "Get Wild Life" and "Night Deluxe" from the album. The video for "Funky Days!" had been previously placed on their first compilation Lead Movies 1 in September 2003. The limited editions of the album included one of four possible posters, a remix of their song "Night Deluxe" and a URL to download specialized wallpapers.

The version of "Here goes!" on the album was an alternate arrangement to the version on their single Night Deluxe.

For their fifteenth anniversary, member Shinya would return to the streets the group started on and talk about their debut and first tour, Lead 1st live tour ~Brand New Era~, which corresponded with the album.

== Background and composition ==
"Funky Days!" was written and composed by musical composer Shinji Tamura, with lyrics written by Tsuchi Enoki. The song carried both elements of pop and hip-hop music. "Get Wild Life" was written and composed by Shinji Tamura, with the rap lyrics written by KATSU. Shinji is most famous for his works in the Tales of series. KATSU had worked with Lead since their debut Manatsu no Magic.

"Night Deluxe" was written and composed by Daisuke "D.I" Imai, who had primarily worked with Avex Group artists, with the lyrics written by Shōko Fujibayashi. Daisuke has worked with famous Japanese singer-songwriter Koda Kumi and South Korean artists BoA and Tohoshinki for top-charting singles. Shoko is best known for their credits with BoA and Foxxi misQ. "Here goes!" was arranged by Ryuichiro Yamaki, who is best known for his remixing work under the name "R.Yamaki," and composed by JUNKOO. The lyrical portion was done by Chokkyuu Murano.

== Promotional activities ==
"Get Wild Life" was used as the theme song to the 2004 film Kamachi, which was directed by Rokurō Mochizuki. The film also featured the members of Lead.

== Track listing ==
CD
No.	Title	Lyrics	Music	Arranger(s)	Length
1.	"Go one's own way"	KATSU • Lead	TAICHI MASTER • DJ TAKU	TAICHI MASTER	1:56
2.	"Night Deluxe"	Shōko Fujibayashi	Daisuke "D.I" Imai • Masato Ishinari	Daisuke "D.I" Imai	4:09
3.	"Life is a party"	Shōko Fujibayashi • K-ON (SOYSOUL) (rap)	K-Muto • Masato Ishinari	K-Muto	4:16
4.	"What cha gonna?"	Yoko Hiji • Mr. Blistah (rap)	Ryuichiro Yamaki	Ryuichiro Yamaki • Mr. Blistah	4:18
5.	"Extreme girl"	Shōko Fujibayashi	Ryuichiro Yamaki • Tsuyoshi Miura • Keiichi Takahashi	Ryuichiro Yamaki • Hiroki Akiyama • Mr. Blistah	4:49
6.	"Privacy"	Shōko Fujibayashi	Daisuke "D.I" Imai • Keiichi Takahashi	Daisuke "D.I" Imai	3:53
7.	"Believe in myself"	Daisuke "D.I" Imai • Mr. Blistah (rap)	Daisuke "D.I" Imai	Daisuke "D.I" Imai • Mr. Blistah	4:40
8.	"Hateshinaku Hiroi Kono Sekai no Nakade" (果てしなく広いこの世界の中で / In This Endless Large World)	Susumu Kawaguchi	Susumu Kawaguchi	Sadahiro Nakano • Mr. Blistah	3:47
9.	"True Romance"	Minoru Ida	Shinji Tamura	Satoshi Hidaka • Hajime Kodama	4:34
10.	"Get Wild Life"	Shinji Tamura / KATSU (rap)	Shinji Tamura • DJ TAKU	Shinji Tamura	3:39
11.	"Steppin' out"	GENTA	Yasushi Sasamoto	Yasushi Sasamoto	3:22
12.	"Here goes!" (alternative version)	Murano Cyokkyu	JUNKOO • Shinya Tanuichi	JUNKOO	4:20
13.	"Funky Days!"	Atsuyuki Enokido	Shinji Tamura • Nozomi Furukawa • MATARO MISAWA	Shinji Tamura	4:09
14.	"Night Deluxe" (Remix)	Shōko Fujibayashi	Daisuke "D.I" Imai	Daisuke "D.I" Imai	3:17

== Charts ==
Release	Chart	Peak position
August 25, 2004	Oricon Weekly Albums Chart	11
