= Upturn =

Single by Lead

from the album The Showcase
- B-side: "Twilight"; "Versus" (Jacket A & B); "Take You Higher" and "Friendship" (Jacket C)
- Released: June 19, 2013
- Recorded: 2013
- Genre: J-pop, hip hop
- Label: Pony Canyon
- Songwriters: Vincent Degiorgio; Johan Röhr; Sou Matsumoto; 7chi子♪; Shinya Tanuichi; Keita Furuya; Ava Kay; Craig McKenzie; Jenna Donnelly; Kotoro Egami

Lead singles chronology
"Still" (2012)	"Upturn" (2013)	"Green Days/Strings" (2013)

"Upturn" is the twenty-first single by Japanese hip-hop group Lead, released on June 19, 2013, becoming their first release of the year. It became their third consecutive single to chart in the top five on Oricon, ranking at No. 5 for the week, and remained on the charts for three weeks.

The single was released in four formats: two standard CD editions and two CD+DVD editions, with each edition carrying different content. Each edition harbored different content and varying cover art. While both CD+DVD versions contained the same B-sides on the CD and different material on the DVDs, the CD editions harbored different coupling tracks depending on the purchased edition.

"Upturn" became their first release without lead vocalist and group leader Hiroki Nakadoi, whereas he left the group after their previous single due to feelings of inadequacy.

== Information ==
"Upturn" continued Lead's string of top charting singles ("Wanna Be with You" charted at No. 3 and "Still" charted at No. 4), becoming their third to chart in the top five, ranking at No. 5 on the Oricon Singles Chart, and remained on the charts for three consecutive weeks.

The single was released in four editions, a standard CD, two limited CD+DVD combos and a limited CD edition. Each editions harbored differing content. The standard edition contained the title track and coupling track "Twilight" (トワイライト), along with their corresponding instrumentals. Jacket A and B carried the title track and the b-side "Versus", along with their corresponding instrumentals. The jacket A DVD harbored the music video to "Upturn", a dance version and the making video; the jacket B DVD contained a solo interview with lead vocalist and group leader, Hiroki Nakadoi, who explained why he was leaving the group, and their complete encore from their fan club event Leaders Party 10! (Happiness) ハピネス☆ / Hapinesu). Jacket C contained two different coupling tracks, along with the title track, "Take You Higher" and "Friendship", along with all of the corresponding instrumentals.

"Upturn" was written by Canadian DJ and record producer Vincent DeGiorgio, and Swedish songwriter Johan Röhr, with the lyrics written by the members of Lead. The group had worked with DeGiorgio for their previous song, "Still". Johan Röhr had also worked with famous American singer-songwriter Anastacia. "Versus" was written and composed by Ava Kay, Craig McKenzie and songwriter Jenna Donnelly, the latter of which who has worked with the likes of Canadian artist Deborah Cox, Spanish artist Rosa López and Japanese artist Namie Amuro. The lyrics were written by 7chiKo (7chi子♪) and by Lead's own Shinya Tanuichi. 7chiKo would later work with the group for their song "Let's Get on It" from their album The Showcase. "Take You Higher" was composed by Vincent DeGiorgio and Swedish songwriter Carl Utbult, with the lyrics written, again, by 7chiKo and Shinya. The song "Friendship" was written and composed by Kotaro Egami, with the lyrics written by Lead's own Keita Furuya and Shinya Tanuichi. Kotaro had previously worked with the group for their song "Thanks For..." from their album Feel the Vibes (2008), and has worked with the likes of singer-songwriter Koda Kumi.

== Hiroki's departure ==
After receiving the opportunity to debut at the age of 17, the past 10 and a half years I spent as a member of Lead was a wonderful time beyond words. I was able to get here thanks to the support of many people, and I was also able to experience things that not everyone can experience, something irreplaceable in my life. . . . Because of you all, I have been able to come this far.

— Nakadoi Hiroki, To Everyone

After Lead celebrated their tenth anniversary with the Leader's Party 10! concert for their fan club in March 2013, vocalist Hiroki Nakadoi stepped away from the group. His final single release with Lead was for their single "Still", which had been released on December 12, 2012, and his departure was in April the following year.

Hiroki began to discuss his feelings about leaving to the other members prior to his departure, explaining how he felt that they had surpassed him since they debuted in 2002 with "Manatsu no Magic"; however, due to their reassurance and saying that they would all "do their best together", he had decided to stay on, putting more effort into his overall performance. Despite this, he fell into a depression, believing that he was unable to "catch up" to his friends' level and began talking about wanting to leave again. He said how he felt that, due to him still not having any self-confidence, he "shouldn't be with the members who are aiming higher and . . . relying on the kindness of the staff members . . . and the Leaders (their fans)".

Prior to Hiroki making his final decision, the other members, Keita Furuya, Akira Kagimoto and Shinya Tanuichi, had questioned if they should remain as a unit if Hiroki decided to leave. When Hiroki finalized his decision, with full support to the others as a group, they chose to stay together due to the constant support of their fans.

It is such a big thing that our leader is graduating, but we, the three of us, will continue holding up Lead's motto "Stand and Fight," and keep on going as Lead with our full effort, in order to see an even more vivid future with you Leaders.

— Shinya Tanuichi, Keita Furuya, Akira Kagimoto

== Music video ==
For the music video to "Upturn", it focused on the group, now working as a trio, and their synchronization. It opened with the group against a blank canvas, followed by a shot of them dancing with the scene overlapped with a lens flare effect. For the chorus, three backup dancers joined in, balancing against the white backdrop.

Other shots focuses on each individual member against a blue cloth, representing the sky. Other choreographed shots were filmed in black and white in stop motion. While the backup dancers wore only white, the members – Shinya, Keita and Akira – donned gray trousers and a gray vest with white undershirts.

Three weeks prior to the single's official release, on May 27, 2013, Pony Canyon's official YouTube for Lead uploaded the music video to help promote the single.

== Track listing ==
(Official Track List)

CD
No.	Title	Lyrics	Music	Length
1.	"Upturn"	Lead	Vincent Degiorgio • Johan Röhr	4:38
2.	"Twilight" (トワイライト)	Sou Matsumoto	Sou Matsumoto	4:54
3.	"Upturn" (instrumental)		Vincent Degiorgio • Johan Röhr	4:38
4.	"Twilight" (instrumental)		Sou Matsumoto	4:52
Total length:				19:02

CD (Jacket A & B)
No.	Title	Lyrics	Music	Length
1.	"Upturn"	Lead	Vincent Degiorgio • Johan Röhr	4:38
2.	"Versus"	7chi子♪ • Shinya Tanuichi	Ava Kay • Craig McKenzie • Jenna Donnelly	3:46
3.	"Upturn" (instrumental)		Vincent Degiorgio • Johan Röhr	4:38
4.	"Versus" (instrumental)		Ava Kay • Craig McKenzie • Jenna Donnelly	3:44
Total length:				16:46

CD (Jacket C)
No.	Title	Lyrics	Music	Length
1.	"Upturn"	Lead	Vincent Degiorgio • Johan Röhr	4:38
2.	"Take You Higher"	7chi子♪ • Shinya Tanuichi	Vincent DeGiorgio • Carl Utbult	4:25
3.	"Friendship"	Keita Furuya • Shinya Tanuichi	Kotaro Egami	4:09
4.	"Upturn" (instrumental)		Vincent Degiorgio • Johan Röhr	4:38
5.	"Take You Higher" (instrumental)		Vincent DeGiorgio • Carl Utbult	4:25
6.	"Friendship" (instrumental)		Kotaro Egami	4:07
Total length:				26:22

DVD (Jacket A)
No.	Title	Length
1.	"Upturn" (music video)	4:54
2.	"Upturn" (dance version)	4:54
3.	"Upturn" (off-shot video)

DVD (Jacket B)
No.	Title	Length
1.	"Hiroki Nakadoi Solo Interview After Graduation Performance" (卒業ライブ本番直前中土居宏宜ソロインタビュー)
2.	"Fan Club Event「Leaders Party 10!～Happiness☆～」Final Encore in Tokyo" (Complete Recorded Uncut; ファンクラブイベント「Leaders Party 10!～ハピネス☆～」東京最終公演アンコール(完全ノーカット収録))

== Charts ==
Release	Chart	Peak position	Chart rrun
June 19, 2013	Oricon Weekly Singles Chart	5	3 weeks
