= Night Deluxe =

Single by Lead

from the album Brand New Era
- B-side: "Here Goes!"
- Released: June 16, 2004
- Recorded: 2004
- Genre: J-pop, hip hop
- Label: Flight Master
- Songwriters: Daisuke "D.I" Imai; Shōko Fujibayashi; Chokyū Murano; Junkoo; Ryuichiro Yamaki
- Producer: Daiskue "D.I" Imai

Lead singles chronology
"Get Wild Life" (2003)	"Night Deluxe" (2004)	"Tenohira o Taiyō ni / Delighted" (2004)

"Night Deluxe" is the sixth domestic single by Japanese hip hop group Lead. It became their highest-charting single at the time, peaking at No. 5 on the Oricon charts and remaining on the charts for five weeks.

The single became their first to be released as a CD+DVD combo, though the combo pack was of limited release.

== Information ==
"Night Deluxe" became their highest charted single at the time, ranking at No. 5 on the Oricon Singles Charts, and remained on the charts for five consecutive weeks. Limited editions included participation event tickets and a trading card.

"Night Deluxe" became the group's first single to be released as both a standard CD and a CD+DVD combination. While both editions contained the title track, the b-side "Here goes!", along with their corresponding instrumentals, the DVD harbored behind-the-scenes videos of the group. The music video for "Night Deluxe" would later be released on their second video compilation, Lead Movies 2.

The title track was written and composed by musical composer Daisuke "D.I" Imai, who had primarily worked with Avex Group artists, with the lyrics written by Shōko Fujibayashi. Daisuke has worked with famous Japanese singer-songwriter Kumi Koda and South Korean artists BoA and Tohoshinki for top-charting singles. Shoko is best known for their credits with BoA and Foxxi misQ. The coupling track, "Here goes!", was arranged by Ryuichiro Yamaki, who is best known for his remixing work under the name "R.Yamaki," and composed by JUNKOO. The lyrical portion was done by Chokkyuu Murano.

"Night Deluxe" won gold during the 46th Japan Record Awards, alongside "Mune Kogasu..." by Da Pump, "Quincy" by BoA and "Carry On" by EXILE among others.

== Packaging ==
"Night Deluxe" became Lead's first single to be released as both a standard CD and a CD+DVD combo. The CD+DVD was of limited edition, while the CD is still available. Both editions held the same material on the CD: the title track, the b-side "Here Goes!", and their corresponding instrumentals.

However, instead of carrying the music video to "Night Deluxe", the DVD contained off-shots of the group during filming of their videos, along with interviews focusing on each member.

== Track listing ==
CD
No.	Title	Lyrics	Music	Arranger(s)	Length
1.	"Night Deluxe"	Shōko Fujibayashi	Daisuke "D.I" Imai	Daisuke "D.I" Imai	4:11
2.	"Here Goes!"	Chokkyuu Murano	Junkoo	Ryuichiro Yamaki	3:59
3.	"Night Deluxe" (instrumental)		Daisuke "D.I" Imai	Daisuke "D.I" Imai	4:09
4.	"Here Goes!" (instrumental)		Junkoo	Ryuichiro Yamaki	3:57
Total length:					16:16

DVD
No.	Title	Length
1.	"Lead Off-Shots Movies"

== Charts ==
Release	Chart	Peak position
June 16, 2004	Oricon Weekly Singles Chart	5
