= Virgin Blue (song) =

Single by Lead

from the album 4
- B-side: "Cosmic Drive"
- Released: March 8, 2006
- Recorded: 2006
- Genre: J-pop, hip hop
- Label: Flight Master
- Songwriters: Suzuki Kisaburo; Yoshiaki Sagara; Haya; Kaji Katsura; Takuya Harada
- Producer: Suzuki Kisaburo

Lead singles chronology
"Baby Running Wild" (2005)	"Virgin Blue" (2006)	"Summer Madness" (2006)

"Virgin Blue" (バージンブルー) is the tenth single by the Japanese hip-hop group Lead, released on March 8, 2006, eight months after their previous single "Baby Running Wild". It peaked in the top ten on the Oricon charts at #9 and remained on the charts for one full month. Limited editions of the single included one of ten trading cards or a special prize.

"Virgin Blue" is a cover of the 1984 song of the same name, originally released by the six-member rock band Sally as their debut song. Four years after Lead's release, they would perform an updated rendition on their single "Speed Star" titled "Virgin Blue 2010".

== Information ==
"Virgin Blue" followed seven months after their studio album Lead! Heat! Beat!. The single debuted well on the Oricon Singles Chart, taking the #9 slot for the week and remaining on the charts for four consecutive weeks. The first-press editions of the single included one of ten possible trading cards and a special ticket that offered buyers the chance to win one of 500 live event tickets or an original promotional item for the single.

"Virgin Blue" was released as a standard CD, not carrying a CD+DVD counterpart. While a music video for "Virgin Blue" was released for syndication upon the single's release, it would not be available for fans to purchase until the release of the group third compilation DVD, Movies 3, released two years later in August 2008. The CD carried the title track, the coupling track "Cosmic Drive" and both songs' corresponding instrumentals.

The single's title track was a cover of the rock band Sally's song "Virgin Blue", originally released on July 1, 1984 as their debut song. While SALLY's original song carried more elements of rock, Lead's rendition was given a more upbeat pop/hip-hop sound, updating to the current musical trends and style. The song was originally composed by musical composer Suzuki Kisaburo with the lyrics written by Sagara Yoshiaki. However, for Lead's 2006 version, the music was performed by Haya from the group Summer Snow Surprise.

Takuya Harada wrote and composed the single's b-side "Cosmic Drive", which was an upbeat blend of jazz and dance music. The song's lyrics were written by Kaji Katsura, who is best known for their works with the Japanese group AAA and South Korean girl group After School.

In 2010, Lead would release an alternate version of "Virgin Blue" on their single "Speed Star".

== Track listing ==
CD
No.	Title	Lyrics	Music	Arranger(s)	Length
1.	"Virgin Blue" (バージンブルー)	Sagara Yoshiaki	Haya	Suzuki Kisaburo	3:44
2.	"Cosmic Drive"	Kaji Katsura	Takuya Harada	Takuya Harada	4:14
3.	"Virgin Blue" (instrumental)		Haya	Suzuki Kisaburo	3:41
4.	"Cosmic Drive" (instrumental)		Takuya Harada	Takuya Harada	4:13
Total length:					15:51

== Charts ==
Release	Chart	Peak position
March 8, 2006	Oricon Weekly Singles Chart	9
