= Lead Upturn 2008: Feel the Vibes =

Lead Upturn 2008 ～Feel The Vibes～

Video by Lead
- Released: December 3, 2008
- Recorded: 2008
- Genre: Pop, hip-hop
- Label: Flight Master; DVD (PCBP-51921)

Lead chronology
Movies 3 (2008)	Lead Upturn 2008 ～Feel The Vibes～ (2008)	in blue (2009)

Lead Upturn 2008 ~Feel The Vibes~ is the fifth concert DVD released by the Japanese hip-hop group Lead, released a year after their previous concert tour DVD on December 3, 2008. It charted at #37 on the Oricon charts, remaining on the charts for two weeks.

The tour corresponded with their fifth studio album, Feel the Vibes, and contained songs predominantly from the album.

== Information ==
Lead Upturn 2008 ~Feel The Vibes~ is the fifth concert DVD released by the Japanese hip-hop group Lead. It was released on December 3, 2008, one full year after their previous tour DVD, Lead Upturn 2007 ~B.W.R~. It peaked in the top forty of the Oricon DVD Charts at #37, where it remained for two consecutive weeks.

The tour corresponded with their fifth studio album Feel The Vibes, harboring most of the songs from the album. Other songs included were "Manatsu no Magic", "Virgin Blue" and "Baby Running Wild" among others. They also performed the song "Sunnyday", which was released during the time the group was touring.

The performance utilized on the DVD was of their final performance at the Nakano Sun Plaza in Nakano, Tokyo.

== Track listing ==
<OP.THE VIBES>

1. "Baby what turns you on"
2. "Tokio Night"
3. Medley
  "Night Deluxe"
  "Baby'cuz U!"
  "Hateshinaku Hiroi Kono Sekai no Nakade"
4. "Step by Step"
5. "Manatsu no Magic"
6. "Stand Up!"
7. "Umi"
8. "Tasogare Gradation"/"DANCE CORNER"
9. "Sunnyday"
10. "DJ+DANCE"
11. "Sleepin' Flower"
12. "Taisetsu na Mono"
13. "Fall In Love"/"DANCER & DJ"
14. "One For Da Soul"
15. "Baby Running Wild"
16. "Wicked Wicked☆SUMMER PARTY"
17. "Summer Madness"
18. "Virgin Blue"
  Encore
19. "Drive Alive"
20. "One"
21. "Thanks for..."

== Charts ==
Release	Chart	Peak position
December 3, 2008	Oricon DVD Charts	37
