= Lead Tracks: Listener's Choice =

Compilation album by Lead
- Released: August 6, 2008
- Recorded: 2002–2008
- Genre: Hip hop, pop, R&B
- Label: Pony Canyon; CD (PCCA-02705)

Lead chronology
Feel The Vibes (2008)	Lead Tracks: Listener's Choice (2008)	Now or Never (2012)

Singles from Lead Tracks: Listener's Choice
- 1. "Sunnyday" Released: July 30, 2008

Lead Tracks: Listener's Choice (stylized as Lead Tracks ~listener's choice~) is the first compilation album by Japanese hip-hop group Lead. It was their lowest charting album, only reaching No. 67 on Oricon and dropping off of the charts by the second week.

The songs chosen for the album were voted on by fans throughout East Asia, and those with the highest votes were placed on the track listing.

== Information ==
Lead Tracks ~Listener's Choice~ is the first compilation album/greatest hits album by Japanese hip-hop group Lead. It became their lowest charting album on the Oricon Albums Charts, peaking at No. 67 and remaining on the charts for one week. Their following album, Now or Never, would not be released until 2012, four years after Lead Tracks ~Listener's Choice~.

The track list for the album consisted of songs between their 2002 debut with "Manatsu no Magic", up until their then-most recent song "Sunnyday", which was released one week prior at the end of July. The songs for the album were voted on by fans throughout East Asia, including Japan, Taiwan, Hong Kong and South Korea. Songs with the highest vote were placed on the album.

As with their previous albums, Lead Tracks ~Listener's Choice~ was only available as a standard CD, not carrying a CD+DVD counterpart. Instead, the music video for "Sunnyday" was placed on their compilation DVD Movies 3, which was released the same day as the album.

Several b-sides from their singles had made it to the album. These included "Freedom No Rule" from Atarashii Kisetsu e (April 13, 2005), "One" from Summer Madness (June 21, 2006) and "Get Dizzy" from Drive Alive (March 14, 2007). Other songs were from their album Feel the Vibes. These included "Baby what turns you on", "Tokio Night" (stylized as TOKIO NIGHT) and "Wicked Wicked Summer Party" (stylized as Wicked Wicked☆SUMMER PARTY). The track "I believe" was also on the album, which was originally released on their studio album Lead! Heat! Beat!.

== Background and composition ==
"Manatsu no Magic" was Lead's debut single and charted well on Oricon at #18. The track was written and composed by musical composer Yasushi Sasamoto, who also wrote and composed the songs "Show me the way" and "Fly Away." The strings in "Fly Away" were performed by Gen Ittetsu, who is best known for his works with famous Japanese soloist Gackt. The rap portion of the song was written by KATSU. "Night Deluxe" was written by musical composer Daisuke "D.I" Imai, who had primarily worked with Avex Group artists, with the lyrics written by Shōko Fujibayashi.

Tatsuyuki Okawa wrote the song "Delighted", while Shoko Fujibayashi and Mr. Blistah collaborated for the lyrics. "Freedom No Rule", was composed and performed by Japanese composer Hayabusa. The lyrics were written by Tetsuya Hashinaga, who is best known by his stage name "T2ya", and Koto Wakanade. The track "I believe" was from their second studio album, Lead! Heat! Beat!, and was composed by POPY. Both POPY and Lead's rapper Shinya Tanuichi wrote the lyrical portion.

"Virgin Blue" was a cover of the rock band SALLY's song "Virgin Blue," originally released on July 1, 1984 as their debut song. Lead's rendition was given a more upbeat pop/hip-hop sound, compared to the rock sound of the original. The song was originally composed by Suzuki Kisaburo with the lyrics written by Sagara Yoshiaki. The music was performed by Haya from the group Summer Snow Surprise.

"Summer Madness" was written by Yasunori Tanaka and Nice Hashimoto, the latter who wrote the lyrics for the track. The track was performed by Motonari Murakawa, who later went on to work with kawaii metal band BABYMETAL. "One" was composed by Koichi Tsutaya, who had also written the lyrics, while the music was performed by Seiji Motoyama, who had also written and composed both "Get Dizzy!" and "Sunnyday" (the latter of which had the lyrics written by the members of Lead). "Drive Alive" was written by Kenji Ijima and Daisuke Kahara, while the music was performed by Y.T.H.

"Baby what turns you on" was from their studio album Feel the Vibes, and was written and composed by the group LL Brothers. "Tokio Night" and "Wicked Wicked☆Summer Party" had also been from the same album. "Tokio Night" was written by shonen-JET, while "Wicked Wicked☆Summer Party" was written by Lead's own Shinya Tanuichi, along with Shoko Fujibayashi.

== Track listing ==
CD
No.	Title	Lyrics	Music	Arranger(s)	Length
1.	"Manatsu no Magic"	Yasushi Sasamoto	Yasushi Sasamoto	Yasushi Sasamoto	3:50
2.	"Show Me the Way"	Yasushi Sasamoto	Yasushi Sasamoto	Yasushi Sasamoto	4:03
3.	"Fly Away"	Yasushi Sasamoto • KATSU	Yasushi Sasamoto • Gen Ittetsu	Yasushi Sasamoto	5:04
4.	"Night Deluxe"	Shōko Fujibayashi	Daisuke "D.I" Imai	Daisuke "D.I" Imai	4:09
5.	"Delighted"	Shōko Fujibayashi • Mr. Blistah	Tatsuyuki Okawa	Tatsuyuki Okawa	4:36
6.	"Freedom No Rule"	T2ya • Kotowakade (コトワカナデ)	Hayabusa	Hayabusa	4:43
7.	"I Believe"	Shinya Tanuichi • POPY	POPY	POPY	4:51
8.	"Virgin Blue"	Sagara Yoshiaki	Suzuki Kisaburo	Haya	3:40
9.	"Summer Madness"	Nice Hashimoto	Motonari Murakawa	Yasunori Tanaka • Nice Hashimoto	3:22
10.	"One"	Kouichi Tsutaya	Seiji Motoyama	Kouichi Tsutaya	3:57
11.	"Drive Alive"	Lisa	Y.T.H	Ken Iijima • Daisuke Kahara	3:30
12.	"Get Dizzy"	kikko	Seiji Motoyama	Seiji Motoyama	3:27
13.	"Baby What Turns You On"	LL Brothers	LL Brothers	LL Brothers	3:10
14.	"Tokio Night"	shonen-JET	shonen-JET	shonen-JET	5:04
15.	"Wicked Wicked Summer Party"	Shōko Fujibayashi • Shinya Tanuichi	Shōko Fujibayashi	Shinya Tanuichi	3:39
16.	"Sunnyday"	Lead	Seiji Motoyama	Seiji Motoyama	4:14
Total length:					1:05:19

== Charts ==
Release	Chart	Peak position
August 6, 2008	Oricon Weekly Albums Chart	67
