= Lead Live Tour Upturn 2005 =

Video by Lead
- Released: December 7, 2005
- Recorded: 2005
- Genre: Pop, hip-hop
- Label: Flight Master; DVD (PCBP-51586)

Lead chronology
Lead Movies 2 (2005)	Lead Live Tour Upturn 2005 (2005)	Lead Upturn 2006 [4] (2006)

Lead Live Tour Upturn 2005 (stylized as Lead LIVE TOUR UPTURN 2005) is the second concert DVD by the Japanese hip-hop group Lead, released on December 7, 2005. It charted at No. 35 on Oricon and remained on the charts for two weeks.

The tour coincided with their studio album Lead! Heat! Beat!. Included with the DVD was a twenty-page photo book.

== Information ==
Lead Live Tour Upturn 2005 is the second concert DVD released by the Japanese hip-hop group Lead. It peaked at #35 on the Oricon DVD Charts, where it remained for two consecutive weeks. Included with the DVD was a twenty-page photo-book.

While the tour was predominantly composed of music from their third studio album Lead! Heat! Beat!, it also carried music from both their debut album Life On Da Beat (2003) and second album Brand New Era (2004). Unlike their first tour (Lead 1st live tour ~BRAND NEW ERA~), the concert was not released on VHS and only released on DVD. Bonus features on the DVD included a ten minute long behind-the-scenes making, including dance rehearsals and interviews.

During the tour, the group performed the unreleased song "LD style". The song would remain a tour-exclusive, never garnering an official release on a single or album.

The term "upturn" utilized in the title would end up becoming the name of all of their corresponding concert tours.

== Track listing ==
=== DVD ===
1. "Rock the House!! ~Opening~"
2. "Prism"
3. "Freedom No Rule"
4. "Night Deluxe"
5. "What cha gonna?"
6. "Love Magic"
7. "Fly Away"
8. "ACT -AIR MOVE-"
9. "I believe"
10. "LD style"
11. "Extreme girl"
12. "True Romance"
13. "DANCE CORNER -mini ART world-"
14. "Atarashii Kisetsu e"
15. "Dear"
16. "Steppin' out" (medley)
17. "Hateshinaku Hiroi Kono Sekai no Nakade"
18. "Manatsu no Magic"
19. "Delighted" (encore)
20. "Jump around"
21. "Baby Runnin' Wild"
22. "Funky Days!" (bonus track)
23. "Off-Shot Video"

== Charts ==
Oricon Sales Chart (Japan)

Release	Chart	Peak position
December 7, 2005	Oricon DVD Charts	35
