= Lead Upturn 2006: 4 =

Lead Upturn 2006 [4]

Video by Lead
- Released: December 6, 2006
- Recorded: 2006
- Genre: Pop, hip-hop
- Label: Flight Master; DVD (PCBP-51887)

Lead chronology
Lead Live Tour Upturn 2005 (2005)	Lead Upturn 2006 [4] (2006)	Lead Upturn 2007: B.W.R (2007)

Lead Upturn 2006: 4 (stylized as LEAD UPTURN 2006 [4]) is the third concert DVD by the Japanese hip-hop group Lead, released a year after their previous tour video Lead Live Tour Upturn 2005. It performed better on the Oricon charts than the previous DVD, entering at #24 and remaining on the charts for two weeks.

While the tour mainly coincided with their studio album 4, it also featured songs from their debut album Life on da Beat (2003).

== Information ==
The DVD was released on December 6, 2006. The featured performance took place on August 28 at the Kanagawa Prefectural Civic Hall in the Naka Ward of Yokohama, Kanagawa Prefecture.

During the tour, the group performed two exclusive songs, "Time to Jam" (TIME TO JAM) and "356STEP", that were not otherwise officially released on a single or album.

Bonus features on the DVD included a behind-the-scenes film, including dance rehearsals and interviews.

== Track listing ==
=== DVD ===
1. "Rough Style"
2. "Deep in my heart"
3. "Star Playa"
4. "Fly Away"
5. "Manatsu no Magic"
6. "Love Rain"
7. "Eien no Ichi-byou"
8. "Shake Up"
9. "Show me the way"
10. "356STEP"
11. "What cha gonna?"
12. "Higher Revolution"
13. "Time To Jam"
14. "Jewel of Queen"
15. "Only You Can Hurt Me"
16. "Believe in myself"
17. "I believe"
18. "Baby'cuz U!"
19. "Baby Runnin' Wild"
20. "Virgin Blue"
21. "Summer Madness"
22. "Party tune"
23. "One"
  Bonus Track
24. "Off-Shot"

== Charts (Japan) ==
Release	Chart	Peak position
December 6, 2006	Oricon DVD Charts	24
