= Lead Upturn 2007: B.W.R =

Lead Upturn 2007 ～B.W.R～

Video by Lead
- Released: December 12, 2007
- Recorded: 2007
- Genres: Pop, hip-hop
- Labels: Flight Master; DVD (PCBP-51910)

Lead chronology
Lead Upturn 2006: 4 (2006)	Lead Upturn 2007 ～B.W.R～ (2007)	Movies 3 (2008)

Lead Upturn 2007 ~B.W.R~ is the fourth concert DVD by the Japanese hip-hop group Lead, released on December 12, 2007. It charted at #34 on the Oricon charts for one week.

The tour held music from their studio albums Life On Da Beat, Brand New Era, Lead! Heat! Beat! and 4, along with new material that would never garner an official release.

== Information ==
Lead Upturn 2007 ~B.W.R~ is the fourth concert DVD released by the Japanese hip-hop group Lead. It was their fourth tour and third annual Upturn tour, which they would house every year. It ranked at #34 on the Oricon DVD Charts, yet dropped off the charts in the first week.

Due to not having a corresponding album to house music from, the group performed their more popular songs, along with new material they would not officially release. The behind-the-scenes making was included as bonus footage on the DVD.

During the tour, the group performed the unreleased songs "B.W.R", "Sweetest Taboo", "Red Eye Night" and "Features" (FEATURES). The songs would remain tour-exclusives, never garnering an official release on a single or album.

The performance utilized on the DVD was of their performance at the Nakano Sun Plaza in Nakano, Tokyo.

== Track listing ==
(Official Track List)

1. "B.W.R"
2. "What cha gonna?"
3. "Love Rain"
4. "Privacy"
5. "Night Deluxe"
6. "Extreme girl"
7. "Deep in my heart"
8. "Jewel of Queen"
9. "Sweetest Taboo"
10. "No Doubt"
11. "Love&Everything"
12. "Boku ga Tsuki ni Inoru Yoru"
13. "Dear"
14. "Red Eye Night"
15. "Cosmic Drive"
16. "Drive Alive"
17. "FEATURES"
18. "Umi"
19. "One For Da Soul"
20. "Funky Days!"
21. "Summer Madness"
22. "Baby'Cuz U!"
23. "Virgin Blue"
24. "Sora no Kanata e"
25. "High Time"
  Bonus Track
26. "Off-Shot Video"

== Charts ==
Release	Chart	Peak position
December 12, 2007	Oricon DVD Charts	34
