= Movies 3 =

Video by Lead
- Released: August 6, 2008
- Recorded: 2002–2008
- Genre: Pop, hip hop
- Label: Flight Master; DVD (PCBP-51558)

Lead chronology
Lead Upturn 2007: B.W.R (2007)	Movies 3 (2008)	Lead Upturn 2008: Feel the Vibes (2008)

Movies 3 (stylized as MOVIES3) is the third compilation DVD released by the hip-hop group Lead. It charted at #40 on the Oricon charts, where it remained for two weeks. Unlike their first two compilation films, Movies 3 contained every music video since their debut with "Manatsu no Magic" (2002) to their most recent video "Sunnyday" (2008).

It became their first compilation release to not have a VHS counterpart, only being released on DVD.

== Information ==
Movies 3 is the third compilation DVD by the Japanese hip-hop group Lead, released on August 6, 2008 under the Pony Canyon sub-label Flight Master. The DVD reached #40 on the Oricon DVD charts, staying on the charts for two consecutive weeks. It was their first compilation to not be released as both a DVD and VHS, only carrying a DVD release. This was due to the decline of the VHS market as the optical disc, namely the DVD, began taking on popularity.

The DVD housed every music video the group had released from their debut song "Manatsu no Magic" (2002), to their then-most recent video "Sunnyday" (2008). Their next compilation DVD, Movies 4, would not be released until eight years later in May 2015.

The cover art was shot in the same location as their music video for "Sunnyday", which was primarily filmed in an empty swimming pool. The group even donned the outfits worn in the shoot.

== Track listing ==
DVD
No.	Title	Length
1.	"Manatsu no Magic" (Music Video)	3:59
2.	"Show me the way" (Music Video)	4:11
3.	"Fly Away" (Music Video)	5:09
4.	"Funky Days!" (Music Video)	4:24
5.	"Get Wild Life" (Music Video)	3:51
6.	"Night Deluxe" (Music Video)	4:19
7.	"Tenohira wo Taiyou ni" (Music Video)	3:11
8.	"Atarashii Kisetsu e" (Music Video)	5:27
9.	"Baby Running Wild" (Music Video)	3:07
10.	"Virgin Blue" (Music Video)	3:53
11.	"Summer Madness" (Music Video)	4:47
12.	"Drive Alive" (Music Video)	3:38
13.	"Umi" (Music Video)	5:38
14.	"Stand Up!" (Music Video)	3:33
15.	"Sunnyday" (Music Video)	4:23
Total length:		1:03:30

== Charts ==
Chart (2008)	Peak position
Oricon Weekly DVD Top 200	40
