= 1st Live Tour: Brand New Era =

Lead 1st live tour ~Brand New Era~

Video by Lead
- Released: November 17, 2004
- Recorded: 2004
- Genres: Pop, hip-hop
- Labels: Flight Master; VHS (PCVP.53401); DVD (PCBP.51334)

Lead chronology
Lead Movies 1 (2003)	Lead 1st live tour ~Brand New Era~ (2004)	Lead Movies 2 (2005)

1st Live Tour ~Brand New Era~ (stylized as Lead 1st live tour ～BRAND NEW ERA～) is the first concert video release by the Japanese hip-hop group Lead. It was released on both DVD and VHS on November 17, 2004. It managed to peak in the top ten on Oricon at No. 9.

Despite corresponding with their second studio album Brand New Era, most of the songs performed where from their debut album Life On Da Beat.

== Information ==
Lead 1st live tour ~Brand New Era~ is the first concert released on video by the Japanese hip-hop group Lead. It was released on both DVD and VHS. It broke into the top ten on the Oricon DVD charts at No. 9.

Although the tour was to correspond with their second studio album, Brand New Era, most of the songs performed were from their debut album Life On Da Beat. They also performed the tour-exclusive song "Tribal Party" (stylized as TRIBAL PARTY), which would never be released on an album or single.

The performance utilized for the video was their finale at Nakano Sun Plaza in Nakano, Tokyo on August 25, 2004.

This would be their only concert to be released on VHS, whereas the VHS format was on the decline, while the optical disc, such as the DVD, was on the rise.

== Track listing ==
1. "Opening"
2. "One For Da Soul"
3. "Night Deluxe"
4. "Love Rain"
5. "Shake Up"
6. "Fly Away"
7. "Extreme Girl"
8. "Life is a party!"
9. "Hateshinaku Hiroi Kono Sekai no Nakade"
10. "Tribal Party"
11. "DANCER CORNER (Om Mani Padme Hum)"
12. "Only You Can Hurt Me"
13. "DJ TIME"
14. "Funky Days!" (Does It Be Funky? Version)
15. "Show me the way" (2004 Summer Version)
16. "Be Happy" (Lovers Rock Version)
17. "Here goes!"
18. "Shining Day"
19. "Get Wild Life"
20. "Manatsu no Magic"
21. "Night Deluxe" (Remix)
22. "I want ya"
  <Bonus Video>
23. "Off-shot"

== Charts (Japan) ==
Chart (2004)	Peak position
Oricon Weekly DVD Top 200	9
