= Stand Up! (Lead song) =

Single by Lead

from the album Feel the Vibes
- B-side: "Load"; "Sleepin' Flower"
- Released: February 6, 2008
- Recorded: 2008
- Genre: J-Pop, hip hop
- Label: Flight Master
- Songwriter(s): Lead; Seiji Motoyama; Kentaro Akutsu; Shōko Fujibayashi; Akira Sasaki; Dora
- Producer(s): Seiji Motoyama

Lead singles chronology
"Umi" (2007)	"Stand Up!" (2008)	"Sunnyday" (2008)

"Stand Up!" is the fourteenth single released by the Japanese hip-hop group Lead. The single debuted in the top twenty on Oricon, where it took the No. 20 slot for the weekly ranking and remained on the charts for four weeks.

The single was released as both a standard CD and a limited edition CD+DVD combo. The B-side "Load" was released early on December 26, 2007, and utilized as a tie-in song for mu-mo, dwango.jp and the Japanese music streaming site music.jp. It was the third time Vision Factory held the "Choose Your Theme Song". "Stand Up!" was used as the seventh ending theme to the anime series Katekyō Hitman Reborn!.

== Information ==
"Stand Up!" was released seven months after their previous single, "Umi", on February 6, 2008. The single broke the top twenty on the Oricon Singles Charts, taking No. 20 for the weekly ranking, and remaining on the charts for four consecutive weeks.

The single was released as standard CD and a limited edition CD+DVD combo pack. The CD portion carried the title track, its corresponding instrumental and the coupling tracks "Load" and "Sleepin' Flower". The DVD carried the music video and off-shot making video for "Stand Up!". Although released both on the DVD and during syndication of the single's release, the music video for "Stand Up!" would later be placed on their third compilation DVD Movies 3, which became available in August of that year.

"Stand Up!" was written and composed by musical composer Seiji Motoyama, who had previously, and would continue to, worked with the group. While Seiji composed the piece, the members of Lead - Hiroki, Shinya, Keita and Akira - wrote the lyrics, with Shinya writing the rap portion. "Sleepin' Flower" was written and composed by musical composer Akira Sasaki, while the lyrics were written by famed lyricist Shōko Fujibayashi. The track "Load" was composed by Kentaro Akutsu, while Tetsuya Oyama and the Japanese group DORA performed the piece. Kentaro also wrote the lyrics for the track.

== Background and composition ==
Seiji Motoyama both composed and wrote the title track, "Stand Up!". Seiji had previously worked with Lead for their songs "One", "Get Dizzy!" and "Umi". Seiji has also worked with the likes of soloist Hikaru Utada and South Korean group CNBLUE. While Seiji composed the piece, the lyrics were written by Akira Kagimoto, Keita Furuya, Hiroki Nakadoi and Shinya Tanuichi of Lead, with Shinya writing the rap portion.

"Load" was written and composed by former member of the group ZERO, Kentaro Akutsu. Kentaro has also worked with Japanese groups MAX (5) and BAND-MAID®. Both Tetsuya Oyama and Japanese group DORA (ドラ) performed the instrumental for "Load." DORA is composed of three members: Minato Nagai, Masako Yabimoto and Asami Yoneomori. They typically perform announcements for Nippon TV. The lyrics to "Sleepin' Flower" were written by Shōko Fujibayashi, who had previously written the lyrics to Lead's songs "Night Deluxe", "Summer Splash" and "Delighted." Akira Sasaki wrote and performed the song.

== Track listing ==
CD
No.	Title	Lyrics	Music	Arranger(s)	Length
1.	"Stand Up!"	Lead	Seiji Motoyama	Seiji Motoyama	3:27
2.	"Load"	Kentaro Akutsu	Tetsuya Oyama • Dora	Kentaro Akutsu	3:55
3.	"Sleepin' Flower"	Shōko Fujibayashi	Akira Sasaki	Akira Sasaki	4:47
4.	"Stand Up!" (instrumental)		Seiji Motoyama	Seiji Motoyama	3:03
Total length:					15:12

DVD
No.	Title	Length
1.	"Stand Up!" (music video)	3:33
2.	"Stand Up!" (off-shot video)

== Charts ==
Release	Chart	Peak position
February 6, 2008	Oricon Weekly Singles Chart	20
