= Lead Movies 1 =

Video by Lead
- Released: September 18, 2003
- Recorded: 2002–2003
- Genre: Pop, hip hop
- Label: Flight Master; VHS (PCVP.53254); DVD (PCBP.50910)

Lead chronology
Lead Movies 1 (2003)	Lead 1st live tour ~Brand New Era~ (2004)

Lead Movies 1 (stylized as Lead MOVIES 1) is the first compilation video release by the Japanese hip-hop group Lead. The compilation ranked at #11.

The compilation features the music videos the group's singles, beginning with Manatsu no Magic in 2002 and ending with Funky Days! in July 2003. It was released on both DVD and VHS.

== Information ==
Lead Movies 1 is the first video release by the Japanese hip-hop group Lead, released on September 18, 2003, under the Pony Canyon sub-label Flight Master. It charted at #11 on the Oricon DVD charts. The compilation was released as both a DVD and VHS. At the time of release, the VHS was on the decline, while the optical disc, namely the DVD, began taking on popularity.

The compilation featured every music video the group had released at that point - "Manatsu no Magic", "Show me the way", "Fly Away" and "Funky Days!". With the exception of "Funky Days!", all of the songs had come from their debut studio album Life On Da Beat ("Funky Days!" would later be placed on Brand New Era). Along with the music videos, it also contained select live performances, behind-the-scenes makings of the music videos and private videos, showing the members in their everyday lives.

Their following video compilation, Lead Movies 2 (stylized as Lead MOVIES2) would be released in 2005.

== Track listing ==
DVD
No.	Title	Length
1.	"Manatsu no Magic" (Music Video)	3:59
2.	"Show me the way" (Music Video)	4:11
3.	"Fly Away" (Music Video)	5:09
4.	"Funky Days!" (Music Video)	4:24
5.	"Live Performances"
6.	"Off-shots"
7.	"Documentary"
8.	"Specialties"

== Charts (Japan) ==
Chart (2003)	Peak position
Oricon Weekly DVD Top 200	11
