= Natsukawa =

Natsukawa (written: 夏川) is a Japanese surname. People with the name include:

- Jun Natsukawa (夏川 純), Japanese gravure idol
- Rimi Natsukawa (夏川 りみ), Japanese folk singer
- Shiina Natsukawa (夏川 椎菜) (b. 1996) Japanese voice actress, singer and YouTuber
- Shizue Natsukawa (夏川 静枝), Japanese actress
