= Lead Movies 2 =

Video by Lead
- Released: March 16, 2005
- Recorded: 2003–2005
- Genre: Pop, hip hop
- Label: Flight Master; VHS (PCVP.53426); DVD (PCBP.51393)

Lead chronology
| Lead 1st live tour ~Brand New Era~ (2004) | Lead Movies 2 (2005) | Lead Live Tour Upturn 2005 (2005) |

Lead Movies 2 (stylized as Lead MOVIES2) is the second compilation video release by the Japanese hip-hop group Lead. It charted at #9 on the Oricon charts.

The compilation featured the music videos "Get Wild Life" and "Night Deluxe" from their studio album Brand New Era, and "Tenohira wo Taiyou ni" from Lead! Heat! Beat!. As with their previous video releases, it was released on both DVD and VHS.

== Information ==
Lead Movies 2 is the second compilation video release by the Japanese hip-hop group Lead, released on March 16, 2005 under the Pony Canyon sub-label Flight Master. It charted at #9 on the Oricon DVD charts. The compilation was released on both DVD and VHS. It would be their final video compilation to be released on VHS, whereas the VHS was on the decline as the optical disc began taking over the market.

The compilation featured two of the music videos the group had released for their Brand New Era studio album - "Get Wild Life" and "Night Deluxe" - and the video for "Tenohira wo Taiyou ni", which would later be placed on their third studio album Lead! Heat! Beat!. Along with the music videos, it also contained the promotional videos for the singles, live performances, behind-the-scenes makings of the music videos and special videos that showed the members in the studio and during dance rehearsals.

Their following video compilation, Movies 3, would be released three years later in 2008.

== Track listing ==
DVD
| No. | Title | Length |
|---|---|---|
| 1. | "Get Wild Life" (Music Video) | 3:51 |
| 2. | "Night Deluxe" (Music Video) | 4:19 |
| 3. | "Tenohira wo Taiyou ni" (Music Video) | 3:03 |
| 4. | "Off-shots" | 45:22 |
| 5. | "Documentary" | 8:11 |
| 6. | "Specialties" |

== Charts ==
| Chart (2005) | Peak position |
|---|---|
| Oricon Weekly DVD Top 200 | 9 |
