= Kyōgo =

- Gender: Male

Origin
- Origin: Japanese
- Meaning: Different meanings depending on the kanji used

Kyōgo, Kyogo or Kyougo (written: 亨梧 or 恭吾) is a masculine Japanese given name. Notable people with the name include:

- Kyogo Furuhashi (古橋 亨梧; born 1995), a Japanese footballer.
- Kyogo Kawaguchi (河口 恭吾; born 1974), a Japanese singer-songwriter.
