= In Blue (Akira Kagimoto) =

in blue

Video by Akira Kagimoto
- Released: July 1, 2009
- Recorded: 2002–2009
- Genre: Documentary
- Label: Flight Master; DVD (PCBE-53128)
- Producer: Kadokawa Marketing

Akira Kagimoto chronology
| Lead Upturn 2008: Feel the Vibes (2008) | in blue (2009) | Lead Upturn 2009: Summer Day & Night Fever (2009) |

In Blue (stylized as in blue) is a documentary video about the youngest member of the hip-hop group Lead, Akira Kagimoto (鍵本輝). The DVD charted at No. 70 on the Oricon charts, dropping off after the first week.

The video follows Akira while he's on the road, and he discusses his time before and with Lead.

== Information ==
in blue is a documentary DVD released by Pony Canyon, centered around Akira Kagimoto, the youngest member of the hip-hop group Lead. The DVD reached No. 70 on the Oricon DVD charts, where it remained for a week before falling out of the ranking.

The title of the documentary, "in blue", was due to Akira's image color in the group being blue.

In the documentary, Akira talks about growing up in the town of Ikaruga in the Ikoma District of the Nara Prefecture. He talks about his time at the CALESS Vocal & Dance School in Osaka, Japan, where he met friends and future bandmates Hiroki Nakadoi and Shinya Tanuichi. Discussed is the search for a fourth member as the group was going by the name "flow", meeting Keita Furuya and ultimately debuting as "Lead" with "Manatsu no Magic."

The video follows Akira on the road as "a young 20-year-old man who can express himself."

Along with the documentary, the DVD also includes a six-minute photo shoot for the cover and included booklet.

== Track listing ==
DVD
| No. | Title | Length |
|---|---|---|
| 1. | "in blue" | 1.16:00 |

== Charts (Japan) ==
| Release | Chart | Peak position |
|---|---|---|
| July 1, 2009 | Oricon DVD Charts | 70 |
