= Wallpaper Engine =

Utility software

- Wallpaper Engine on Windows 11
- Developers: Kristjan Skutta, Tim Eulitz
- Release: Early Access on Steam Greenlight: 10 October 2016; 10 years ago
- Stable release: 2.8.42 / 30 June 2026; 3 months ago
- Written in: C++, JavaScript, PHP
- Operating system: Windows 7, Windows 8, Windows 10, Windows 11, Android
- Platform: IA-32 and x86-64
- License: Proprietary software
- Website: https://www.wallpaperengine.io/

Wallpaper Engine is an application for Windows with a companion app on Android which allows users to use and create animated and interactive wallpapers, similar to the defunct Windows DreamScene. Wallpapers are shared through the Steam Workshop functionality as user-created downloadable content. It features its own rendering engine and provides a wallpaper editor, allowing for the creation of 2D and 3D wallpapers, including a particle system editor and a fork of JavaScript called SceneScript for additional wallpaper logic. It also supports using video files, audio files, webpages and some 3D applications as wallpapers.

== History ==
A proposal outlining the general idea of the software was added to Steam Greenlight in December 2015. The application was subsequently released as a paid product on Steam in October 2016 as an early access title. After three years of development, the software left its early access stage in November 2018. In August 2019, Wallpaper Engine was announced to be one of the release titles for Steam China.

In late November of 2021, the team released version 2.0 of Wallpaper Engine. This update brought a new logo, a large set of additional features, support for Windows 11, and a free android release that interfaces with the desktop version.

Despite not being a game, Wallpaper Engine is one of the most used apps on Steam, being located in Steam's Top 25 played games in July 2019 and Top 10 played games in November 2021. Kotaku reported users in China used it to share pornographic videos in 2022.
