= Sunnyday =

Single by Lead

from the album Lead Tracks: Listener's Choice
- B-side: "Sunnyday" (Blue Dragon Edit)
- Released: July 30, 2008
- Recorded: 2008
- Genre: J-pop, hip hop
- Label: Flight Master
- Songwriters: Lead; Seiji Motoyama
- Producer: Seiji Motoyama

Lead singles chronology
"Stand Up!" (2008)	"Sunnyday" (2008)	"GiraGira Romantic" (2009)

"Sunnyday" is the fifteenth single released by the Japanese hip-hop group Lead, released on July 30, 2008. It was their second single of 2008, their previous single, "Stand Up!", was released five months earlier in February. The single failed to break the top 20 on Oricon, charting at No. 34 and remaining on the charts for two weeks.

"Sunnyday" was used as the theme song to the second season of the anime series Blue Dragon.

== Information ==
"Sunnyday" was released five months after their prior single "Stand Up!", which was released in February. The single charted low on the Oricon Singles Charts at #34, failing to break the top 20. It was also their only single released for their compilation album Lead Tracks: Listener's Choice, which was an album composed of songs chosen by fans throughout East Asia.

The single was only released as a standard CD, which held "Sunnyday", the edited version of the track and an instrumental. The music video for "Sunnyday", while aired for syndication upon the single's release, was not available to purchase until the release of their third compilation DVD Movies 3, which became available a week later in August.

"Sunnyday" was written and composed by musical composer Seiji Motoyama, who had previously, and would continue to, worked with the group. While Seiji composed the piece, the members of Lead – Hiroki, Shinya, Keita and Akira – wrote the lyrics, with Shinya writing the rap portion.

On February 27, 2012, Lead's official YouTube uploaded the music video.

== Promotional advertisements ==
"Sunnyday" was used as the opening theme to the second season of the anime series Blue Dragon: Blue Dragon: Tenkai no Shichiryuu (天界の七竜 / Seven Dragons of Heaven).

== Track listing ==
CD
No.	Title	Lyrics	Music	Length
1.	"Sunnyday"	Lead	Seiji Motoyama	4:15
2.	"Sunnyday" (Blue Dragon edit)	Lead	Seiji Motoyama	1:30
3.	"Sunnyday" (instrumental)		Seiji Motoyama	4:15
Total length:				10:00

== Charts ==
Release	Chart	Peak position
July 30, 2008	Oricon Weekly Singles Chart	34
