= Pink no Idenshi =

Japanese manga series

- Cover of the Japanese version of vol. 1, first released on February 10, 2003

Pinkの遺伝子
- Genre: Comedy
- Manga
- Written by: Jun Yuzuki
- Published by: Kodansha
- Imprint: Bessatsu Friend Comics
- Magazine: Bessatsu Friend
- Original run: 2002 – 2005
- Volumes: 7
- Television drama
- Directed by: Kayoko Hanamura
- Produced by: Masayuki Iwata; Takashi Ohashi
- Written by: Haruko Nagatsu
- Original network: TV Tokyo
- Original run: October 3, 2005 – December 26, 2005
- Episodes: 13

Pink no Idenshi (Japanese: Pinkの遺伝子; lit. "Pink Gene") is a Japanese manga series by Jun Yuzuki. It was serialized in the monthly shōjo manga magazine Bessatsu Friend from 2002 to 2005. A live-action television drama adaptation was broadcast on TV Tokyo from October to December 2005.

== Plot ==
Pink no Idenshi is an anthology series of unrelated short stories about high school girls exploring romantic and sexual relationships with their classmates and teachers. Volumes 2, 4, and 5 feature an ongoing plot about Natsu Saitō and Taichi Kobayashi, two high school students who have just begun dating, exploring the conflicts and misunderstandings they face in their newfound relationship.

== Cast and characters ==
=== Main characters ===
Taichi Kobayashi (小林 タイチ, Kobayashi Taichi)
Played by: Hiroki Nakadoi
Taichi is a shy teen who attracts the attention of both men and women. When Natsu confesses her love for him, he accepts her affection and they both leave the classroom in front of their teacher. He becomes a target for the "Virgin Killer", who is the school nurse, and is helped by Natsu. Later on, he becomes a target of Kirinoin Tsukasa, a male teacher who becomes infatuated with him and Natsu.
Natsu Saitō (斉藤 ナツ, Saitō Natsu)
Played by: Narumi Konno
Natsu is an outgoing teen with a crush on Taichi. She confesses her love to him and he returns her feelings. After the confession, they both leave the classroom in front of their teacher. When her boyfriend becomes the target of the "Virgin Killer", she saves him before it's too late. When she and Taichi become targets of Kirinoin, she attempts to put a stop to it, only to have the teacher try to crush her self-esteem and convince her that her relationship with Taichi won't last. By the end, she overcomes the thoughts and refuses to leave Taichi, even when both of them are kidnapped by the obsessed teacher.
Hikaru Chikubushima (竹生島 光, Chikubushima Hikaru)
Played by: Makoto Sakamoto
Hikaru is a classmate and friend of both Taichi and Natsu. Throughout the series, they stick up for him when he his made fun of by other classmates and he, in turn, helps them through their troubles. In episode ten, he walks in when Kirinoin has Taichi pinned to a bed locked in a kiss. However, Kirinoin threatens to kill Hikaru's pet hamster, Angelina, if he interferes.
Satoshi Hanamura (花村 恵, Hanamura Satoshi)
Played by: Zenjirō
Satoshi is Natsu and Taichi's teacher, who watches them confess their love for each other and abandon class together. Despite demanding order in his classroom, when he sees the shy Taichi fall for the outgoing Natsu, he is happy for the newly-formed couple.
Kaoruko Hōjō (宝條 薫子, Hōjō Kaoruko)
Played by: Kaoru Sumiya
Kaoruko is a school nurse known as a "Virgin Killer" throughout Phoenix High School. After meeting Taichi, she becomes infatuated with his innocence and virginity and demands to make him her next target. She locks him in the office with her, where she attempts to take his virginity. Unsuccessful, she drugs him and kidnaps him. Taichi manages to escape, though in an induced stupor.
Tsukasa Kirinoin (桐ノ院 司, Kirinoin Tsukasa)
Played by: Tsuyoshi Kimura
Kirinoin is a male teacher who becomes obsessed with Taichi and Natsu, becoming jealous of their relationship. He tries to manipulate the two, trying to convince them that their love is false and a "fragile relationship." While he fails at breaking Natsu, he succeeds with Taichi, who he forces onto a bed and kisses. Before he can advance, Hikaru walks in to see a numb Taichi and the sadistic amusement of Kirinoin. With his obsession in full-throttle, he kidnaps both Taichi and Natsu.

=== Other characters ===
- Manami Fuku as Rise Shibata
- Hiro Mizushima as Mizuki Iskushima
- Jun Natsukawa as Ayase Saiki
- Mitsuru Karahashi as Masaya Fujiki
- Eri Sakai as Yumeka Shindō
- Shoichi Matsuda as Toworu Kurosawa
- Misaki Momose as Nao Matsuda
- Ryunosuke Kawai as Miriwo Kinoshita
- Takayo Kashiwagi as Madoka Mizue
- Motoki Ochiai as Daisuke Yuki
- Meguru Ishii as Chizuru Kanno
- Yu Shirota as Maki Nakajō
- Takuya as Senri Nakajō

== Media ==
=== Manga ===
Pink no Idenshi is written and illustrated by Jun Yuzuki. It was serialized in the monthly manga magazine Bessatsu Friend from 2002 to 2005. The chapters were later released in 7 bound volumes by Kodansha under the Bessatsu Friend Comics imprint.

While Pink no Idenshi largely contains a series of unrelated short stories, volumes 2, 4, and 5 feature an ongoing plot about Natsu Saitō and Taichi Kobayashi.

No.	Japanese release date	Japanese ISBN
1	February 10, 2003	978-4-06-341325-0
"Furachi na Kyōshi" (ふらちな教師; lit. "Immoral Teacher"); "Abunai Hōkago" (アブナイ放課後; lit. "After School Dangers"); "Tenshi no Itazura" (天使のイタズラ; lit. "An Angel's Prank"); "Kiken na Sankaku Kankei" (キケンな三角関係; lit. "Dangerous Love Triangle")
2	June 11, 2003	978-4-06-341340-3
1. "Chapter 1" (第1話, Dai-ichi-wa); 2. "Chapter 2" (第2話, Dai-ni-wa); 3. "Chapter 3" (第3話, Dai-san-wa); 4. "Chapter 4" (第4話, Dai-yon-wa); 5. "Gojitsutan" (後日談; lit. "Sequel")
The volume features a story arc titled "Hold Me Baby" (Hold me ベイビー, Hold me Beibī), centered on Taichi and Natsu.
3	March 12, 2004	978-4-06-341378-6
"Kankin wa Mitsu no Aji" (監禁は蜜の味; lit. "Being Locked Up Tastes Like Honey"); "Ubatte Darling" (奪ってダーリン★, Ubatte Dārin; lit. "Steal Me Away, Darling"); "Nemureru Mori" (眠れる森; lit. "Sleeping Forest"); "Kiss Kiss Kiss" (キス×キス×キス, Kisu Kisu Kisu)
4	August 11, 2004	978-4-06-341395-3
1. "Chapter 1" (第1話, Dai-ichi-wa); 2. "Chapter 2" (第2話, Dai-ni-wa); 3. "Chapter 3" (第3話, Dai-san-wa); 4. "Chapter 4" (第4話, Dai-yon-wa); 5. "Choose Me Baby" (Choose me ベイビー, Choose me Beibī)
The volume is a continuation of Taichi and Natsu's story arc, titled "Hug Me Baby" (Hug me ベイビー, Hug me Beibī).
5	March 11, 2005	978-4-06-341421-9
1. "Chapter 1" (第1話, Dai-ichi-wa); 2. "Chapter 2" (第2話, Dai-ni-wa); 3. "Chapter 3" (第3話, Dai-san-wa); 4. "Chapter 4" (第4話, Dai-yon-wa); 5. "Chapter 5" (第4話, Dai-go-wa); 6. "Gojitsutan" (後日談; lit. "Sequel")
The volume is a continuation of Taichi and Natsu's story arc, titled "Choose Me Baby" (Choose me ベイビー, Choose me Beibī).
6	October 13, 2005	978-4-06-341449-3
"Bokura no Hi-mi-tsu" (ボクらのヒ･ミ･ツ; lit. "Our Secret"); "Hatsukoi no Amai Wana" (初恋の甘い罠; lit. "First Love's Sweet Trap"); "Help Me Baby" (Help me ベイビー, Help me Beibī); "Long Kiss Night" (ロング･キッス･ナイト, Rongu Kissu Naito)
7	March 13, 2006	978-4-06-341465-3
"Give Me Baby" (Give me ベイビー, Give Me Beibī); "Change Me Baby (Part 1)" (Change me ベイビー(前編), Change me Beibī (Zen-pen)); "Change Me Baby (Part 2)" (Change me ベイビー(後編), Change me Beibī (Kō-hen)); "Kamitsu Shōnen" (花蜜少年; lit. "Nectar Boy")

=== TV drama ===
A live-action television drama adaptation was broadcast from October 3 to December 26, 2005, on TV Tokyo. It was produced by Masayuki Iwata with screenplay by Haruko Nagatsu. The series starred Lead member Hiroki Nakadoi as Taichi Kobayashi, Narumi Konno as Natsu Saitō, Zenjiro as Satoshi Hanamura, Makoto Sakamoto as Hikaru Chikubushima, Kaoru Sumiya as Kaoruko Hojo and Tsuyoshi Kimura as Tsukasa Kirinoin. The series' opening theme song is "Ranning" by The Phanky Okstra and the ending theme is "Play With the Numbers" by Hinoi Team.

All thirteen episodes were released on DVD on February 25, 2006. The series was later re-compiled and released as several discounted volumes: "Abunai Hōkago" and "Ōji-sama no Mitsu no Aji" were released as vol. 1 on October 27, 2006; "Ubatte Darling" and "Furachi na Kyōshi" were released as vol. 2; and "Kiken na Sankaku Kankei" and "Kiss Kiss Kiss" were released as vol. 3 on November 24, 2006. Natsu and Taichi's story arc was compiled as vol. 4 under the subtitle Taichi & Natsu and released on December 15, 2006.

No.	Title	Directed by	Written by	Original release date
1	"Episode 1"; Transliteration: "Dai-ichi-wa" (Japanese: 第1話)	Unknown	Unknown	October 3, 2005
2	"Episode 2"; Transliteration: "Dai-ni-wa" (Japanese: 第2話)	Unknown	Unknown	October 10, 2005
3	"Episode 3"; Transliteration: "Dai-san-wa" (Japanese: 第3話)	Unknown	Unknown	October 17, 2005
4	"Episode 4"; Transliteration: "Dai-yon-wa" (Japanese: 第4話)	Unknown	Unknown	October 24, 2005
5	"Episode 5"; Transliteration: "Dai-go-wa" (Japanese: 第5話)	Unknown	Unknown	October 31, 2005
6	"Episode 6"; Transliteration: "Dai-roku-wa" (Japanese: 第6話)	Unknown	Unknown	November 7, 2005
7	"Episode 7"; Transliteration: "Dai-nana-wa" (Japanese: 第7話)	Unknown	Unknown	November 14, 2005
8	"Episode 8"; Transliteration: "Dai-hachi-wa" (Japanese: 第8話)	Unknown	Unknown	November 21, 2005
Nao Matsuda makes a romantic date with her childhood boyfriend Miriwo Kinoshita. She makes whiskey bonbons, unbeknownst to Miriwo, who eats several and becomes seductive.
9	"Episode 9"; Transliteration: "Dai-kyū-wa" (Japanese: 第9話)	Unknown	Unknown	November 28, 2005
Tsukasa Kirinoin becomes infatuated with Taichi and Natsu, and grows jealous of their relationship. When he forces Taichi onto a bed and kisses him, he is discovered by Taichi's and Natsu's friend, Hikaru.
10	"Episode 10"; Transliteration: "Dai-jū-wa" (Japanese: 第9話)	Unknown	Unknown	December 5, 2005
With the threat of Kirinoin killing his hamster Angelina, Hikaru refuses to intervene with Kirinoin's plans. While trying to crush Natsu's self-esteem to bring her to him, Kirinoin calls her relationship with Taichi "beautifully fragile." As his obsession reaches its peak, he kidnaps Taichi and Natsu. Finding the hamster Angelina safe, Hikaru reaches the decision to save his friends.
11	"Episode 11"; Transliteration: "Dai-jūichi-wa" (Japanese: 第11話)	Unknown	Unknown	December 12, 2005
Madoka Mizue is the art club's sadistic president, and when underclassmen Daisuke Yuki joins, she can't help but tease him.
12	"Episode 12"; Transliteration: "Dai-jūni-wa" (Japanese: 第12話)	Unknown	Unknown	December 19, 2005
Chizuru Kanno has a crush on her classmate Maki Nakajō, who constantly ignores her. She happens upon Senri Nakajō, Maki's older brother, who is a devil with an angel's face. Lustful for Senri, she tries to remember her love for Maki.
13	"Episode 13"; Transliteration: "Dai-jūsan-wa" (Japanese: 第13話)	Unknown	Unknown	December 26, 2005
Taichi decides to go to an inn operated by a relative of Chikubushima with four others guys, including Yakkun and Goro, who negatively influence him. Meanwhile, Natsu's grades are falling and she feels as though she should give up if she did poorly on her final. While walking, she meets Yuinoka, who people believe is mentally unstable. The two become more acquainted as they walk around town.
