= Katsuya Kobayashi =

Japanese actor (born 1981)

- 小林且弥
- Born: 10 December 1981 (age 44); Shimonoseki, Yamaguchi, Japan
- Occupation: Actor
- Years active: 2001–present
- Agent: enchante

Katsuya Kobayashi (小林且弥, Kobayashi Katsuya; born 10 December 1981) is a Japanese actor from Shimonoseki. Even though he and fellow Kamen Rider Kabuto: God Speed Love-exclusive Rider actor Mitsuki Koga/Kamen Rider Ketaros were only Kamen Riders within the movie, they did make a guest appearance during the final episode of the series as two people affected by the necklaces that transform people into Natives.

== Selected filmography ==
As director

- Horizon (2024)

As actor

- Boutaoshi! (2003)
- Rockers (2003)
- School Wars: HERO (2004)
- Bubu Again (2004)
- Concrete a.k.a. Konkurîto (2004)
- Kamachi (2004)
- Sukûru deizu a.k.a. School Daze (2005)
- Pray (2005)
- Linda Linda Linda (2005)
- Saigo no bansan a.k.a. The Last Supper (2005)
- Yumeno (2005)
- Kamen Rider Kabuto: God Speed Love (2005)
- Hōkyō Monogatari (2006)
- The Cottage (2006)
- Cat Girl Kiki (2006)
- Stay (2007)
- Watch Me (Kansatsu: Eien ni Kimi wo Mitsumete) (2007)
- SAI-REN (2007)
- Little DJ (2007)
- Makiguri no Ana (Peeping Tom) (2007)
- Building and the Zoo (2008)
- Kizumomo (2008)
- Bodyjack (2008)
- Running on Empty (2009)
- Lost Paradise in Tokyo (2010)
- Sweet Silly Love Song (2010)
- The Death Penalty Standards (Shikei Kijun) (2011)
- Gene Waltz (2011)
- Furusatogaeri-Going Home- (2011)
- Synchronicity (2011)
- Arakawa Under the Bridge (2012)
- The Devil's Path (Kyōaku) (2013)
- Maestro! (2015)
- The Emperor in August (2015)
- Blossoming Into A Family (Madou: After the Rain) (2016)
- Wilderness (2017)
- Kamen Rider Build (2017–2018)
- Last Winter, We Parted (2018)
- Zenigata (2018)
- Dad, Chibi is Gone (2019)
- Family Bond (2020)
- Pop! (2021)
- Takano Tofu (2023)
- Kaneko Fumiko: Because I Wanted to (2026), Pak Yŏl
