= Boutaoshi! =

2003 film directed by Tetsu Maeda

- Film poster
- Directed by: Tetsu Maeda
- Written by: Minoru Matsumoto
- Starring: Shinya Tanuichi, Hiroki Nakadoi, Keita Furua, Akira Kagimoto, Kyohei Kaneko, Yu Kitamura
- Distributed by: Tokyo Theater; PAL Planning; Pony Canyon; Japan Skyway; Jesus Vision
- Release date: March 21, 2003 (Japan)
- Language: Japanese

Boutaoshi! (Japanese: 棒たおし!; lit. Pole Toppling!) is a 2003 Japanese film. It was directed by Tetsu Maeda (School Days with a Pig) and released on March 21, 2003. The film's screenplay was written by Minoru Matsumoto (Dolphin blue: Fuji, mou ichido sora e). It features artists from the Pony Canyon record label, including members of Lead and Flame. Production committee members included those from Pony Canyon, Japan Skyway, Jesus Vision, Tokyo Theaters Company, Inc. and PAL Planning, with distribution by Tokyo Theater and PAL Planning.

The film is based on the Japanese game bo-taoshi, a capture the flag-like game played during school sports days.

The song's main theme was "Fly Away" by Lead, of which Shinya Tanuichi - who played the lead character - is a member.

== Plot ==
The film is based on the Japanese game bo-taoshi, a capture the flag-like game played during sports days in Japan. The game has since been banned as too dangerous.

Boutaoshi! centers around the sport during its peak, due to the high injury rate among players. A group of students decide to create a team for their school's final tournament.

The main character is Tsuguo Takayama (Shinya Tanuichi), who has family issues, most notably with his father, who constantly belittles him after his mother's suicide (Miyuki Matsuda). He starts playing bo-taoshi, though initially he has little interest; after his father mocks bo-taoshi, Tsuguo becomes passionate about it.

He discovers he has a talent for the sport and begins playing with his classmates and friends. The mischievous Isamu Hisanaga (Kyohei Kaneko) sees him and comes up with a plan to test Tsuguo's skills. Tsuguo is conned into joining the final competition.

== Cast ==
- Shinya Tanuichi as Tsuguo Takayama
- Kyohei Kaneko as Isamu Hisanaga
- Akira Kagimoto as Atsushi Tabuchi
- Keita Furuya as Suzumi Manabu
- Hiroki Nakadoi as Toru Akasaka (Nakkan)
- Airi Taira as Sayuri Konno
- Miyuki Matsuda as Yuko Takayama
- Yukari Taki as Miki Takayama
- Tomokazu Miura as Kotaro Ishigaki
- Nanako Takushi as Nurse
- Yu Kitamura as MC
- Katsuya Kobayashi as Classmate

== Release ==
Boutaoshi! made its theatrical debut in Japan on March 21, 2003. It was released on DVD on August 20 of the same year.
