= Windows DreamScene =

Utility Software for Windows Vista

- Windows DreamScene running in Windows Vista Ultimate
- Developer(s): Microsoft
- Initial release: February 13, 2007
- Operating system: Windows Vista Ultimate
- Type: Animated desktop wallpaper
- License: Proprietary
- Website: Windows Dreamscene at the Wayback Machine (archived 10/18/2009)

Windows DreamScene is a utility that allows videos of the .wmv and .mpg format and other optimized animations to be used as desktop wallpapers. It is one of the many Windows Ultimate Extras offered for Ultimate editions of Windows Vista. Prior to its official announcement, DreamScene was rumored to be in creation under the names Motion Desktop and Borealis. After several months of testing, the final version was released on September 25, 2007.

== Overview ==
Rendered content included with DreamScene (such as an animated realization of the Windows Aurora background) was produced by Stardock, while photographic content was provided by the Discovery Channel. Third-party video content in MPEG or WMV format may also be used. In addition, AVI files can be played by altering the file extension. Additionally, in partnership with Dell, Microsoft released a separate DreamScene alongside its Product Red version of the Ultimate edition of Windows Vista.

One of the purported advantages of DreamScene over previous methods of desktop animation is that it makes use of the GPU for display instead of the CPU, leaving the latter free to perform user tasks. To what extent this is achieved is not specified. When a full-screen program is run, such as a game or any window that is maximized, the video will automatically stop since the video will not be seen; this means it uses less GPU and CPU. The video can also be stopped manually. Content encoders need to strive for a balance between compression and file size; decompression requires the CPU, but larger files take up more memory and may cause the disk to be accessed more frequently.

Running a video in the background would have a significant impact on the battery life of mobile computers, whether or not it were rendered by the GPU, so DreamScene may display a static background when a computer is running on batteries. The software relies heavily on the Desktop Window Manager (or DWM, part of Windows Aero), and will not function without it.

In Windows 7, DreamScene was replaced by a "Desktop Slideshow" feature, which produces slideshow background wallpapers. It does not support animated backgrounds or videos; however, it can still be enabled via third-party tools. In Windows 8, DreamScene was removed entirely, and has not returned on later releases of Windows. In 2025, Sergey Kisselev, a former motion designer and 3D artist at Microsoft, unveiled plans to revive the Dreamscene feature in the 22H2 and 23H2 updates of Windows 11, but this feature is only available on Education edition. However, this feature was scrapped and removed in the 24H2 update. The dynamic wallpaper was only applied to the lock screen, rather than the desktop.

== Alternatives to Windows DreamScene ==
Stardock, who provided several animated backgrounds for Windows DreamScene, offers a chargeable add-on for Windows DreamScene called DeskScapes. This software allows the implementation of dynamic wallpapers (".dream" files). A newer version of DeskScapes (3.5) has since been released, which makes the program compatible with non-Ultimate editions of Vista as well as newer versions of Windows (7, 8, 10, 11).

Wallpaper Engine is a chargeable software that replaces the desktop background with a wide selection of default and user made animated backgrounds. while also providing a complete tool set for user generated wallpapers. The software features its own Rendering engine which enables 2D video, 3D models, and even Interactive elements that respond to mouse cursor movement or keystrokes. It is available for all versions of Windows from 7 to 11.

== See also ==
- Features new to Windows Vista
- Windows Vista Ultimate Extras
- List of features removed in Windows 7
- Active Desktop
