= Jamzvillage =

Japanese singer (born 1978)

Takahiro Momiyama (籾山高広), known as jamzvillage, is a Japanese singer. He was born on September 28, 1978, in Aichi Prefecture, Japan. He is a part of Sony Music Japan's SME Records division.

== Biography ==
Jamzvillage debuted in 2002 with his single "Let's Dance!", which was featured on numerous Japanese TV programs including Pop Japan.tv.

After releasing two more singles, Momiyama released new singles on his Sony website (now offline). Titles included ☆ (Hoshi) and Hey Girl.

== Releases ==
- Let's Dance (05/28/2003)
- Love ALone (10/22/2003)
- 北風 (Kitakaze) (01/28/2004)

== Trivia ==
- Fans call jamzvillage "momi", the first part of his last name (Momiyama).
- Jamzvillage is rumored to have given up his solo career and is now performing with SWEET SEGMENT.
