= Tenohira o Taiyō ni / Delighted =

"Tenohira o Taiyō ni" / "Delighted"

Single by Lead

from the album Lead! Heat! Beat!
- B-side: "Funky Days!" (Does It Be Funky? Remix)
- Released: October 27, 2004
- Recorded: 2004
- Genre: J-pop; hip hop
- Length: 20:27
- Label: Flight Master
- Songwriter(s): Takashi Yanase; Hisashi Nawata; Taku Izumi; Shōko Fujibayashi; Mr. Blistah; Tatsuyuki Okawa

Lead singles chronology
"Night Deluxe" (2004)	"Tenohira o Taiyō ni" / "Delighted" (2004)	"Atarashii Kisetsu e" (2005)

"Tenohira o Taiyō ni" / "Delighted" (手のひらを太陽に / Palm to the Sun) is the seventh domestic single by Japanese hip hop group Lead and their first double A-side release. The single charted in the top ten on the Oricon charts, coming in at #8, and remained on the charts for four weeks.

Unlike their previous singles, which featured a limited edition CD+DVD combo, "Tenohira o Taiyō ni" / "Delighted" was only released a standard CD.

== Information ==
"Tenohira o Taiyō ni" / "Delighted" peaked in the top ten on the Oricon Singles Charts at #8 and remained on the charts for four consecutive weeks. The limited editions of the single contained one of five possible trading cards, a URL that would take purchasers to site for a chance to win their live DVD Lead 1st Live Tour ~Brand New Era~ and for buyers to download a specialized wallpaper.

"Tenohira o Taiyō ni" was a cover of the Japanese nursery rhyme of the same name written by Takashi Yanase in the 1960s. "Delighted" was used as the for the television show Deep Love ~Ayu no Monogatari~, which was an adaption of the cell phone novel Deep Love by Yoshi.

Despite being a double a-side, only "Tenohira o Taiyō ni" received a music video. While the music video was released for syndication upon the single's release, it was not available for purchase until March 16, 2005 on their second compilation VHS/DVD Lead Movies 2 (stylized as Lead MOVIES2).

== Promotional activities ==
The coupling track "Delighted" was used as the theme song for the television show Deep Love ~Ayu no Monogatari~ (アユの物語 / Story of Ayu). The show was a television adaption of the cell phone novel Deep Love by Yoshi and ran for twelve episodes from January 7, 2005 to March 25, 2005.

Keita had played Yoshiyuki in both the film Deep Love and the television show Deep Love ~Ayu no Monogatari~.

== Track listing ==
CD
No.	Title	Lyrics	Music	Arranger(s)	Length
1.	"Tenohira o Taiyō ni" (手のひらを太陽に / Palm to the Sun)	Takashi Yanase	Hisashi Nawata	Izumi Taku	3:04
2.	"Delighted"	Shōko Fujibayashi; Mr. Blistah (rap)	Tatsuyuki Okawa	Tatsuyuki Okawa	4:35
3.	"Funky Days!" (Does It Be Funky? Remix)	Tsuchi Enoki	YANAGIMAN & DJ TAKI-SHIT	Shinji Tamura	5:09
4.	"Tenohira o Taiyō ni" (Instrumental)		Hisashi Nawata	Izumi Taku	3:04
5.	"Delighted" (Instrumental)		Tatsuyuki Okawa	Tatsuyuki Okawa	4:35
Total length:					20:27

== Charts ==
Release	Chart	Peak position
October 27, 2007	Oricon Weekly Singles Chart	8
