= Fly Away (Lead song) =

Single by Lead

from the album Life on da Beat
- B-side: "Shining Day"
- Released: February 5, 2003
- Recorded: 2003
- Genre: J-pop, hip hop
- Label: Flight Master
- Songwriter(s): Yasushi Sasamoto
- Producer(s): Yasushi Sasamoto

Lead singles chronology
"Show Me the Way" (2002)	"Fly Away" (2003)	"Funky Days!" (2003)

"Fly Away" is the third single by Japanese hip-hop group Lead. It peaked in the top ten on the Oricon charts at #10 and remained on the charts for seven weeks, charting longer than their previous singles.

== Information ==
"Fly Away" is Lead's third single and charted in the top ten on the Oricon Singles Chart, taking the number 10 slot for the week and remaining on the charts for seven consecutive weeks. It became their longest charting single, only being met by their later single Get Wild Life.

"Fly Away" was released as a standard CD, not carrying a CD+DVD counterpart. The CD contained the title track, the b-side "Shining Day" and the corresponding instrumentals for both songs. The single came with one of five possible Lead trading cards, a specialized URL to download a wallpaper and a discount coupon for the 2003 film Boutaoshi!, of which all four members of Lead starred in. While the music video was released for syndication to the public upon the single's release, it was not available for the public to purchase until their DVD/VHS release Lead Movies 1 in September of the same year.

Both "Fly Away" and "Shining Day" were written and composed by musical composer Yasushi Sasamoto. Yasushi had worked with Lead on their previous singles. The strings arrangement for the a-side was performed by Gen Ittetsu, who is best known for his works with famous Japanese soloist Gackt. The rap portion of the song was written by KATSU.

This would be their last single released before their debut studio album Life On Da Beat on April 23, 2003.

== Promotional advertisements ==
To help promote the single, "Fly Away" was used as the theme song to the movie Boutaoshi!, which the members of Lead also starred in. It was also used as the opening theme for the Tokyo Broadcasting System Television series Count Down TV throughout the month of February.

== Boutaoshi! ==
"Fly Away" was utilized as the theme song to the movie Boutaoshi!. The members of Lead were featured in the film, playing different characters.

Boutaoshi! (棒たおし! / Pole Toppling!) is a 2003 Japanese film by director Tetsu Maeda, released on March 21, 2003. Based on the Japanese game bo-taoshi, a capture the flag-like game played during sports days, the film centers around Tsuguo Takayama (Shinya Tanuichi), who has a talent for the sport. The mischievous Isamu Hisanaga (Kyohei Kaneko) sees him and delves a plan to test his skills. Tsuguo is conned into joining the annual competition, but how he fares in an event is something else entirely.

The film's screenplay was written by Minoru Matsumoto and directed by Tetsu Maeda. It featured artists from the Pony Canyon record label, including the members of Lead and Flame. Production committee members included those from Pony Canyon, Japan Skyway, Jesus Vision, Tokyo Theaters Company, Inc. and PAL Planning, with distribution being done by Tokyo Theater and PAL Planning.

Boutaoshi! was later released on DVD and VHS on August 20, 2003.

=== Cast ===
- Shinya Tanuichi: Tsuguo Takayama
- Kyohei Kaneko: Isamu Hisanaga
- Akira Kagimoto: Atsushi Tabuchi
- Keita Furuya: Suzumi Manabu
- Hiroki Nakadoi: Toru Akasaka (Nakkan)
- Airi Taira: Sayuri Konno
- Miyuki Matsuda: Yuko Takayama
- Yukari Taki: Miki Takayama
- Tomokazu Miura: Kotaro Ishigaki
- Nanako Takushi: Nurse
- Yu Kitamura: MC
- Katsuya Kobayashi: Classmate

== Music video ==
The music video for "Fly Away" was not included with the release of the single; however, it was given a physical release on their Lead Movies 1 compilation VHS and DVD on September 18, 2003.

The music video was shot in what appears to be a shipyard during sunset. Hiroki opens the video as each member is introduced before cutting to the four members break dancing. For the dance segments, the boys don two outfits: a red parka with black clothes and a white parka with white clothing. The rap break in the video utilized the wide-angle lens, which was predominant in late-90s and early-2000s rap and hip-hop music videos.

Lead's official YouTube uploaded the full video on their account on March 11, 2012.

== Track listing ==
CD
No.	Title	Lyrics	Music	Arranger(s)	Length
1.	"Fly Away"	Yasushi Sasamoto • KATSU	Yasushi Sasamoto • Gen Ittetsu (strings)	Yasushi Sasamoto	5:06
2.	"Shining Day"	Yasushi Sasamoto	Yasushi Sasamoto	Yasushi Sasamoto	3:42
3.	"Fly Away" (Instrumental)		Yasushi Sasamoto • Gen Ittetsu (strings)	Yasushi Sasamoto	5:04
4.	"Shining Day" (Instrumental)		Yasushi Sasamoto	Yasushi Sasamoto	3:41
Total length:					17:33

== Charts ==
Release	Chart	Peak position
February 5, 2003	Oricon Weekly Singles Chart	10
