= Atarashii Kisetsu e =

Single by Lead

from the album Lead! Heat! Beat!
- B-side: "Freedom No Rule"
- Released: April 13, 2005
- Recorded: 2005
- Genre: J-pop; hip hop
- Label: Flight Master
- Songwriter(s): Kyogo Kawaguchi; Yoshiaki Mutou

Lead singles chronology
"Tenohira o Taiyō ni / Delighted" (2004)	"Atarashii Kisetsu e" (2005)	"Baby Running Wild" (2005)

"Atarashii Kisetsu e" (あたらしい季節へ / To the New Season) is the eighth domestic single by the Japanese hip-hop group Lead. It was released nearly six months after their previous single "Tenohira o Taiyō ni / Delighted", on April 13, 2005. It charted well on Oricon, taking the weekly ranking of #6 upon its released.

Limited editions of the singles included one of five possible phone charms, a release event participation ticket, a "Lead 2005 Spring Campaign" postcard and a specialized URL where buyers could download a themed wallpaper.

== Information ==
"Atarashii Kisetsu e" became their first release for the year, with their previous single, Tenohira wo Taiyou ni/Delighted, having been released six months prior in October 2004. It charted in the top ten on the Oricon Singles Charts, taking the #6 spot for the weekly ranking and remaining on the charts for one month.

The single was released as a standard CD and was given a limited edition. The limited edition contained one of five possible phone straps, a ticket to attend their release event, a "Lead 2005 Spring Campaign" postcard and a URL that would take buyers to download a specialized wallpaper.

"Atarashii Kisetsu e" became the first medium ballad written by musical composer Kyogo Kawaguchi, and for the group overall. While the song was composed and written by Kyogo, the piece was performed by Yoshiaki Mutou, who has worked with soloists Hitomi Shimatani and Shela. The coupling track, "Freedom No Rule", was composed and performed by Japanese composer Hayabusa. The lyrics were written by Tetsuya Hashinaga, who is best known by his stage name "T2ya", and Koto Wakanade.

"Atarashii Kisetsu e" won gold during the 47th Japan Record Awards.

== Promotional activities ==
To help promote the single, the title track "Atarashii Kisetsu e" was used as the theme song to the Japanese variety show SARUDIE (サルヂエ), which aired on Nippon TV from April 2004 to January 2007.

The song was also used as the ending theme to Shonen Champloo (少年チャンプル / Boy Mix) throughout the month of March.

== Track listing ==
CD
No.	Title	Lyrics	Music	Arranger(s)	Length
1.	"Atarashii Kisetsu e" (あたらしい季節へ / To the New Season)	Kyogo Kawaguchi	Yoshiaki Mutou	Kyogo Kawaguchi	5:18
2.	"Freedom No Rule"	T2ya • Koto Wakanade	Hayabusa	Hayabusa	4:43
3.	"Atarashii Kisetsu e" (instrumental)		Yoshiaki Mutou	Kyogo Kawaguchi	5:16
4.	"Freedom No Rule" (instrumental)		Hayabusa	Hayabusa	4:40
Total length:					19:57

== Charts ==
Release	Chart	Peak position
April 13, 2005	Oricon Weekly Singles Chart	6
