= Jun Natsukawa =

Japanese gravure idol

Jun Natsukawa 夏川純
- Born: September 19, 1980 (age 45); Hiroshima, Japan
- Occupation: model
- Years active: 1999 – present
- Modeling information
- Height: 5 ft 2 in (1.57 m)
- Hair color: Brown
- Eye color: Brown
- Agency: Pyramid Art House
- Website: http://www.pyramid.tokyo/natsukawa-jun/

Jun Natsukawa (夏川 純, Jun Natsukawa; born 19 September 1980) is a Japanese gravure idol from Hiroshima Prefecture, Japan.

== Career ==
The spectacle society debuts with "Weekly young jump" gravure in 1999. In 2003 started work with Pyramid Art House. Photography collection Believe is the first work. In 2004 become a member of TV Asahi corporation project Angel Eye. KYOURAKU image girl "Miss surprise" in 2006.

In October 2005, she released a CD titled Himetra Trance in which she covered the theme song from the anime Cat's Eye. She made an appearance on the Japanese television show Pink no Idenshi, as a schoolgirl who falls in love with her teacher; and as herself on the reality show Geirinji. She has also been featured in a commercial for Kantan Kirei-na Fudeo.

Although she announced that she was born in 1983 until March 2007, she confessed in her blog that she was actually born on September 19, 1980.

She was featured in the PlayStation 2 game, Yakuza. Though it was just a few pictures, upon entering "Kyushu No. 1 Star", a magazine called "Sabra" can be seen on a table. If you choose to read it, 5 pictures of her will appear.

== Photography collection videos (DVD) ==
- BELIEVE (2003)
- CROVER (2003)
- ぴゅあ (2003)
- Virtual love (バーチャルラブ) (2004)
- Se-woman (Se-女) (2004)
- Jerry Beans (2004)
- Costume play star - Bore (コスプレスター★ボーリング)2005)
- Not a Little Girl (2005)
- Honey Bee×2 (2005)
- False start (フライング...) (2005)
- Pure Love (2005)
- Doll (2005)
- Astraea (2006)
- Perfect collection (2006)
- ONE (2006)
- Pure Heart (2006)
- SCRATCH (2006)
- Midsummer Days (2006)
- Angelic Smile (2007)
- Always Together (2007)
- Pure Summer (2007)
- Naturally (2007)
- Breeze (2008)

== Personal life ==
In November 2010 Natsukawa Jun's engaged with her boyfriend, and on the New Year's Day, January 1, 2011, she has announced on her official blog that she registered her marriage officially.
