= Hiroki Nakadoi =

Japanese singer and actor

Hiroki Nakadoi 中土居宏宜
- Born: July 26, 1985 (age 41); Fujiidera, Osaka, Japan
- Occupations: Singer; actor
- Years active: 2002-2013
- Label: Pony Canyon (formerly)
- Website: hairsalon-heena.com

Hiroki Nakadoi (Japanese: 中土居宏宜, Hepburn: Nakadoi Hiroki; born July 26, 1985) is a former Japanese singer and actor. He is a former member of the boy band Lead and was their leader until retiring in 2013 to become a hairdresser.

== Biography ==
Hiroki Nakadoi was born in Fujiidera, Osaka, Japan on July 26, 1985. He has two brothers, one older and one younger. Throughout his childhood, his parents ran a hair salon from their home in the Hiroshima Prefecture. During his younger years, he was active as a Johnny's Jr. He decided to quit when he began attending CALESS Vocal & Dance School (キャレスボーカル&ダンススクール) in Osaka.

In 2001, Hiroki took part in the Junon Super Boy Contest; however, he landed 24th place and was unable to advance. The following year in 2002, he formed the group "Rhymix" with Shinya Taniuchi and Akira Kagimoto, who had also attended CALESS Vocal & Dance School. In March 2002, the trio began doing live street performances on the streets of Shiroten at Osaka Castle Park. By May 2002, they renamed the group from "Rhymix" to "flow" and began performing by Kyobashi Station. In May, they recruited the winner of the Kyushu/Fukuoka Joint Starlight Audition (九州・沖縄合同スターライトオーディション), Keita Furuya, before changing their name once more to "Lead".

In 2007, Hiroki wrote and composed his first song titled "Kimi ~Sakura~". The song would later be placed on Lead's 2009 single GiraGira Romantic.

During his time with Lead, Hiroki starred in several films and television shows, most notably Pink no Idenshi, where he played the titular character "Taichi Kobayashi" alongside actress Narumi Konno. He would also become a recurring guest on a number of variety shows, including TV Asahi's "More TV!" (もらえるテレビ!). He would also star in musicals alongside his fellow group members. In 2010, he starred as Tsurumi Akihiko in the television drama Tumbling.

After Lead celebrated their tenth anniversary with the Leader's Party 10! concert for their fan club on March 30, 2013 at Zepp Tokyo, Hiroki stepped away from the group due to the belief that his bandmates had surpassed his abilities and he "shouldn't be with members who are aiming higher". Prior to his final decision, the other members questioned if they should remain as a unit if Hiroki decided to leave. When Hiroki finalized his decision, with full support to the others as a group, they chose to stay together.

Hiroki became a freelance hairdresser after leaving the group, working at a hair salon in Tokyo called "Shout." On November 1, 2019, he opened up his own salon in Yoga, Setagaya called "heena".

== Videography ==
During his time as a public figure, Hiroki was featured in several television shows and films; most notably his role of Taichi Kobayashi in the series Pink no Idenshi.

=== Film ===
Title	Year	Roles	Ref.
Boutaoshi!	2003	Toru Akasaka	
Kamachi	2004	Shun Iijma	

=== Television/Variety shows ===
Title	Year	Roles	Ref.
New Year's Kakushigei Tournament (新春かくし芸大会)	2003	As himself	
Pink no Idenshi	2005	Taichi Kobayashi	
Suriruna Yoru Ikemen Gasshukoku (スリルな夜 イケメン合衆国)	2007	As himself	
New Year's Kakushigei Tournament	2008	As himself	
Syakkin Kanojo 2: 1000 Rhapsody	2008	Taishi Kudo	
Arienai! (Episode 10) (あり得ない!)	2010	As himself	
Tumbling	2010	Tsurumi Akihiko	

=== Stage shows ===
Title	Year	Roles	Ref.
Zipangu ~Haruka Naru-do (ZIPANGU～遥かなる道～)	2008	Liu Kun	
Kizuna -Shōnen'yo, Dai Kami o Idake- (絆～少年よ、大紙を抱け～)	2010	Hitoshi Seto	
Kizuna 2011 -Shōnen'yo, Dai Kami o Idake- (絆2011～少年よ、大紙を抱け～)	2011	Hiroshi Seto	
