= 4 (Lead album) =

Studio album by Lead
- Released: July 19, 2006
- Recorded: 2005–2006
- Genres: Hip hop, pop, R&B
- Label: Flight Master

Lead chronology
Lead! Heat! Beat! (2005)	4 (2006)	Feel the Vibes (2008)

Singles from 4
- 1. "Virgin Blue" Released: March 8, 2006; 2. "Summer Madness" Released: June 21, 2006

4 is the fourth studio album by Japanese hip-hop group Lead. The album was released as their fourth album on their four-year anniversary. It ranked lower on the Oricon chart than their previous album, coming in at number 18 and only remaining on the chart for two weeks.

Each album came with one of four possible 3D trading cards.

== Information ==
4 was released on Lead's fourth anniversary as artists, which was where the album's title derived. The album was one of their lower ranking albums on the Oricon Albums Chart, peaking at No. 18 and remaining on the chart for two consecutive weeks. The album consisted of two preceding singles: "Virgin Blue" and "Summer Madness".

For the album, the group delved into the reggae genre, along with their traditional hip hop and R&B beats. The album contained eight new tracks, along with alternate versions of their songs "Summer Madness" and "One" from their "Summer Madness" single. As with their previous albums, a CD+DVD combination was not included, the album carrying only a CD version. Music videos for their songs "Summer Madness" and "Virgin Blue" were later released on their compilation DVD Movies 3 in August 2008.

The song "Virgin Blue" was a cover of the same song, originally performed by six-member Japanese rock band Sally in 1984. Lead's version was given an updated tempo, allowing the song to be more of dance anthem. The lyrics to song were written by Sagara Yoshiaki with the modern arrangement performed by Suzuki Kisaburo.

== Promotional activities ==
To help in promotion, the group performed several songs live and the song "Summer Madness" was used as the ending theme to the television series We Have Muscle! (いただきマッスル! / Itadaki MASSURU) during the month of July.

March 10, 2006 on the popular Japanese show Music Fighter, Lead performed "Virgin Blue". On June 23, they performed "Summer Madness". The group held their corresponding album tour Lead Upturn 2006 [4] throughout the summer and fall months. It was released later on DVD in December.

== Track listing ==
4 track listing
No.	Title	Lyrics	Music	Arranger(s)	Length
1.	"Rough Style"	Mackie • T. Mori	Mackie • Takashi Oba • Shoken	Akitomo Fukishima	1:42
2.	"Deep in My Heart"	Mizuho Hirata • Shinya Taniuchi (rap)	Mizuho Hirata	Mizuho Hirata	3:07
3.	"Star Playa"	Shoko Fujibayashi • Shinya Taniuchi (rap)	Akira Sasaki • Mamoru Takaishi	Akira Sasaki	3:56
4.	"Cosmic Drive"	Kaji Katsura	Takuya Harada	Takuya Harada	4:13
5.	"Baby'Cuz U!"	Kazunari Ohno	Kazunari Ohno	Kazunari Ohno	4:16
6.	"Feel Like Making Love"	Koji Hiraizumi	Koji Hiraizumi • Takashi Nakajo • Isao Takano	Koji Hiraizumi	3:54
7.	"Jewel of Queen"	Shoko Fujibayashi • Shinya Taniuchi (rap)	Komorita Minoru • Kikomaru	Akira Sasaki	3:48
8.	"Here We Go"	Gajin	Gajin • Kikomaru	Gajin	4:23
9.	"Virgin Blue"	Sagara Yoshiaki	Haya	Suzuki Kisaburo	3:41
10.	"PartyTune"	Gajin	Gajin	Gajin	4:45
11.	"Summer Madness" (album version)	Nice Hashimoto	Motonari Murakawa	Nice Hashimoto • Yasunori Tanaka	3:26
12.	"One (Big Up My Homies)"	Koichi Tsutaya	Seiji Motoyama • Hajime Kodama • Shiori Sato • Momoko Shimamine • Yuki Baba	Koichi Tsutaya	4:10
Total length:					45:21

== Charts ==
Release	Chart	Peak position
July 19, 2006	Oricon Weekly Albums Chart	18
