= Get Wild Life =

Single by Lead

from the album Brand New Era
- B-side: "Field of Soul"
- Released: December 3, 2003
- Recorded: 2003
- Genre: J-pop, hip hop
- Label: Flight Master
- Songwriters: Shinji Tamura; Emi Inaba; Fukanuma Motoaki; Katsu
- Producer: Shinji Tamura

Lead singles chronology
"Funky Days!" (2003)	"Get Wild Life" (2003)	"Night Deluxe" (2004)

"Get Wild Life" is the fifth single by Japanese hip hop group Lead released on December 3, 2003. The single peaked in the top ten on the Oricon charts, ranking at #9 for the week, and remained on the charts for seven weeks.

The single came with several bonus items, including a Lead 2003 Winter Campaign postcard, one of five possible trading cards and a specialized URL to download a themed wallpaper and screensaver.

== Information ==
"Get Wild Life" charted in the top ten of the Oricon Singles Charts, taking #9 for the week, and remained on the charts for seven consecutive weeks.

The single was released as a standard CD, including three bonuses: one of five possible trading cards, a URL that led to a downloadable wallpaper and screensaver, and a Lead 2003 Winter Campaign postcard. The single included the title track and the b-side "Field of Soul", along with both songs' corresponding instrumentals. While the music video was released for syndication to the public upon the single's release, it was not available for the public to purchase until their DVD/VHS release Lead Movies 2 in March 2005.

"Get Wild Life" was written and composed by musical composer Shinji Tamura, with the rap lyrics written by KATSU. Shinji Tamura had previously written the music for Lead's prior single Funky Days!, and is most famous for his works in the Tales of series. KATSU had worked with Lead since their debut Manatsu no Magic. "Field of Soul" was written and composed by Fukanuma Motoaki, with the lyrics by Emi Inaba. Fukanuma Motoaki is best known as the solo unit Mellowhead, who began the project after the hiatus of the band PLAGUES, of which Motoaki was the vocalist and guitarist.

== Promotional advertisements ==
To help promote the single, "Get Wild Life" was used as the main theme song to the 2004 film Kamachi, which was based on the life of poet and painter Kamachi Yamada, who died in 1977 at the age of 17.

Despite being the main theme, the song was omitted from the film's official soundtrack.

== Track listing ==
CD
No.	Title	Lyrics	Music	Arranger(s)	Length
1.	"Get Wild Life"	Shinji Tamura • Katsu	Shinji Tamura	Shinji Tamura	3:41
2.	"Field of Soul"	Emi Inaba	Fukanuma Motoaki	Fukanuma Motoaki	5:00
3.	"Get Wild Life" (instrumental)		Shinji Tamura	Shinji Tamura	3:39
4.	"Field of Soul" (instrumental)		Fukanuma Motoaki	Fukanuma Motoaki	4:58
Total length:					17:18

== Charts ==
Release	Chart	Peak position
December 3, 2003	Oricon Weekly Singles Chart	9
