= Kamachi (film) =

- Film poster
- Directed by: Rokurō Mochizuki
- Written by: Chizuko Yamada
- Produced by: Toshiharu Ozawa; Kazutami Ishii; Takehito Hikita; Hideaki Sato
- Starring: Shinya Tanuichi; Hiroki Nakadoi; Akira Kagimoto; Keita Furuya; Akane Osawa
- Music by: Koji Endo
- Production companies: Nippon Herald Films; Pony Canyon; Progressive Pictures; Imagica; Adnes; Sankei Shimbun
- Release date: March 13, 2004 (Japan)
- Country: Japan
- Language: Japanese

Kamachi (Japanese: かまち) is a 2004 Japanese film directed by Rokurō Mochizuki. The film centers around the life of poet and painter Kamachi Yamada at the age of 17. The film stars Lead member Shinya Tanuichi as the titular character.

The film was originally distributed at the 109 Cinemas Takasaki in Takasaki, Gunma, Kamachi Yamada's place of birth, on February 28, 2004. It was released nationwide two weeks later on March 13, 2004.

== Plot ==
The film opens in 1975 with the character Kamachi Yamada (Shinya Tanuichi), who strives to be the best he can be. His motto throughout his life was "24 hours a day is not enough." However, when he fails to get into an elite school, he enlists in a cram school, where he meets Yoko (Fumiko Himeno), with whom he falls in love. After confessing his love, she suggests they remain friends, much to his dismay.

Twenty years later, Shun (Hiroki Nakadoi) starts a web site, calling for people to "enter another world." A girl, Miyuki (Akane Osawa), and a boy, Yuichi (Keita Furuya), respond. All three attend the same cram school, where Yoko (Fumi Dan) is by then an instructor. Miyuki purchases sleeping pills from Shun. Throughout the film, Yoko helps the troubled teens in breaking away from the use of drugs and learning to live in the moment. At the end, she tells Miyuki about Kamachi, who was trying to live his life to the fullest, and how much he loved her.

In 1977, two years after Kamachi and Yoko met, Kamachi had received the news that his studying paid off and he was accepted into an elite high school. It was also the day when Yoko had told Kamachi that it was possible they would not remain friends forever. In 1977, at the age of seventeen, Kamachi lost his life due to being electrocuted from malfunctioning musical equipment. His death was caused by the very guitar he was given for his birthday a few months prior.

== Cast ==
- Shinya Tanuichi as Kamachi Yamada
- Keita Furuya as Sayama Yuichi
- Akira Kagimoto as Himuro Kosuke
- Hiroki Nakadoi as Shun Iijma
- Akane Osawa as Miyuki Kinoshita
- Fumi Dan as Yoko Kanno
- Fumiko Himeno as Yoko Kanno (age 16)
- Yoshizumi Ishihara as Takashi Iijima
- Hiromi Sakimoto as Takashi Iijima (age 16)
- Sonoda Kentaro as Kuramoto Shoichi
- Jun Fubuki as Chizuko Yamada
- Eiji Okuda as Shuichi Yamada
- Taka Kobayashi as Tomoki Yamada
- Hinako Sano as Natsuko Yamada
- Akihiro Shimizu as Sensei Murase
- Michi Yamamura as Haruko Tsunoda
- Toshiyuki Kitami as Director Shiraishi
- Tomorowo Taguchi as Sensei Komori
- Amiko Kanaya as Kaoru Motohashi
- Satoshi Shinohara as Ken Mizushima
- Erika Kuroishi as Makiko Uchimura
- Megumi Takahashi as Satoko Nakajo
- Ikumi Kudo as Tomofumi Shinoda
- Shoichi Matsuda as Kazushi Baba
- Shunsuke Imafuku as Yasuhiro Sawada

== Life and death of Kamachi Yamada ==
Kamachi Yamada (山田 かまち) was born on July 21, 1960, in Takasaki in the Gunma Prefecture, Japan. He had begun to draw pictures when he was a year-and-a-half. By the time he was in second grade, he had begun to write down his own poetry, on the advice of his mother. By third grade, he was able to draw several pictures of animals from memory within an hour. By ninth grade, Kamachi began to immerse himself in rock music due to the influence of The Beatles, Led Zeppelin, and Aerosmith, among others. During that year, he formed a rock group with his friends.

He rebelled against the Japanese education system, causing him to fail his entrance exam for senior high school. During his time in which he studied to retake the exam, he lost a childhood friend, with whom he was in love. The grief led him back to painting and poetry.

Shortly after his seventeenth birthday, Kamachi was electrocuted by his guitar in his tatami room in 1977. After his death, his family discovered multiple notebooks full of poetry, watercolor paintings, and drawings. The works were later placed in a museum.

== Soundtrack ==
Kamachi featured music composed and performed by Koji Endo, along with performances with Bonnie Pink and Anamu & Maki. While the hip-hop group Lead performed the film's theme song, "Get Wild Life", it was not featured on the soundtrack. The group had released the song on December 3, 2003, three months before the film's release.

The soundtrack was released on CD.

=== Kamachi: Original Sound Trax ===
1. "Kamachi Comes Alive at bicycle" – Koji Endo
2. "Twist And Shout" – Anumi & Maki x Koji Endo
3. "Kamachi Comes Alive at bluesky" – Koji Endo
4. "Please Mr. Postman at boy'sroom" – Bonnie Pink x Koji Endo
5. "Boys' Struggle" – Koji Endo
6. "Still in the Dark" – Koji Endo
7. "Kamachi Comes Alive at kitsune" – Koji Endo
8. "Kamachi Comes Alive at shiratama" – Koji Endo
9. "Please Mr. Postman at following" – Koji Endo
10. "Under the Pencil of Agony" – Koji Endo
11. "Kamachi Comes Alive at handshake" – Koji Endo
12. "Please Mr. Postman at laidback" – Bonnie Pink x Koji Endo
13. "This Is Not The Goal" – Koji Endo
14. "Ain't Blown Off" – Koji Endo
15. "Kamachi Comes Alive at nowadays" – Koji Endo

== Critical reception ==
The film generated mixed-to-positive reviews. On the movie site Movie Walker, the film was given predominately positive reviews, garnering a 4 star ranking. On the site FilMarks, the film generated mixed reviews, with a score of 2.6 out of 5.0. On the popular site IMDb, the film had generated a 7.8 out of 10.

Director Rokuro Mochizuki's treatment with hip-hop singer Shinya Taniuchi and actress Jun Fubuki was criticized as being superficial and romanticized.
