= Funky Days! =

Single by Lead

from the album Brand New Era
- B-side: "All My Life (Manatsu no Umi Monogata)"; "Manatsu no Magic 2003" (Magical Red Hot Summer Remix)
- Released: July 30, 2003
- Recorded: 2003
- Genre: J-pop, hip hop
- Label: Flight Master
- Songwriters: Shinji Tamura; Yasushi Sasamoto
- Producer: Yasushi Sasamoto

Lead singles chronology
"Fly Away" (2003)	"Funky Days!" (2003)	"Get Wild Life" (2003)

"Funky Days!" (ファンキーデイズ!) is the fourth domestic single by Japanese hip-hop group Lead, released on July 30, 2003. It was their first to be released after their debut studio album Life on da Beat, bringing in their new era of Brand New Era (2004). The single charted well on the Oricon charts at #10 and remained on the charts for five weeks.

Bonuses with the single included one of five possible trading cards, a URL in which fans could download a specialized wallpaper or screensaver, and a Lead 2003 Summer Campaign postcard.

== Information ==
"Funky Days!" was released three months after their debut studio album Life on da Beat on July 30, 2003. The single performed well on the Oricon Singles Charts, taking #10 for the weekly ranking, and remained on the charts for five consecutive weeks.

The single was released as a standard CD and came with three bonuses: one of five possible trading cards, a URL where fans could download a Lead-themed wallpaper and screensaver, and a Lead 2003 Summer Campaign postcard. Along with the title track and its corresponding instrumentals, the b-side "All My Life ~Manatsu no Umi Monogata~" (ALL MY LIFE ～真夏の海物語～ / Midsummer Ocean Story) was included, as was a 2003 remix of their debut song "Manatsu no Magic." The 2003 remix was done by AKIRA, who created the side-project PALM DRIVE. While the music video was released for syndication upon the single's release, it did not become available to purchase until the release of their first video compilation, Lead Movies 1, in September of that year.

"Funky Days!" was written and composed by musical composer Shinji Tamura, with lyrics written by lyricist Atsuyuki Enokido. The song carried both elements of pop and hip-hop music. The coupling track, "All My Life ~Manatsu no Umi Monogata~," was written and composed by Yasushi Sasamoto.

== Background and composition ==
"Funky Days!" was written and composed by musical composer Shinji Tamura, with lyrics written by Atsuyuki Enokido. Atsuyuki has written lyrics for the comedy group No Plan, who occasionally perform music, Mitsuo Iwata and Abe Natsumi. Shinji Tamura is most well-known for composing the music for Namco games, most notably Tales of Phantasia (1999), which is part of the Tales of... role-playing video game series.

The coupling track, "All My Life ~Manatsu no Umi Monogata~," was written and composed by Yasushi Sasamoto, who worked with Lead on their previous songs, "Manatsu no Magic", "Show me the way" and "Fly Away," and who composed much of the music from their Life On Da Beat album. Yasushi has also worked predominantly with the female vocal group MAX. Their other efforts include Hitomi Shimatani, Aya Matsuura and MISIA.

== Track listing ==
CD
No.	Title	Lyrics	Music	Arranger(s)	Length
1.	"Funky Days!" (ファンキーデイズ!)	Atsuyuki Enokido	Shinji Tamura • Nozomi Furukawa • MATARO MISAWA	Shinji Tamura	4:09
2.	"All My Life ~Manatsu no Umi Monogata~" (真夏の海物語 / Midsummer Ocean Story)	Yasushi Sasamoto	Yasushi Sasamoto	Yasushi Sasamoto	3:57
3.	"Manatsu no Magic 2003" (MAGICAL RED HOT SUMMER REMIX)	Yasushi Sasamoto	AKIRA	AKIRA	3:33
4.	"Funky Days!" (Instrumental)		Shinji Tamura	Shinji Tamura	4:09
Total length:					15:48

== Charts ==
Release	Chart	Peak position
July 30, 2003	Oricon Weekly Singles Chart	10
