= Umi (song) =

Single by Lead

from the album Feel the Vibes
- B-side: "Sora no Kanata e"; "Kimi wa Nanika ga Dekiru"
- Released: July 18, 2007
- Recorded: 2007
- Genre: J-Pop, hip hop
- Label: Flight Master
- Songwriters: MJ; Seiji Motoyama; Gajin; Toshiyuki Kimori; Akira Sasaki; Michio Yamagami
- Producer: Seiji Motoyama

Lead singles chronology
"Drive Alive" (2007)	"Umi" (2007)	"Stand Up!" (2008)

"Umi" (海 / "Ocean") is the thirteenth domestic single released by the Japanese hip-hop group Lead. The single failed to break the top twenty on Oricon for the weekly ranking, charting at #27 for two weeks.

"Umi" was released as a CD+DVD combo, which was only released for a limited time. One of five possible pictures were also packaged with each copy.

The B-side "Kimi wa Nanika ga Dekiru" was a cover of the same song, originally released by 99Harmony.

== Information ==
"Umi" failed to chart in the top twenty on the Oricon Singles Chart, reaching #27 for the weekly ranking and only remaining on the charts for two consecutive weeks. Limited copies of the single housed one of five possible photographs.

The single was only released as a limited CD+DVD combo pack. The CD featured the title track with its corresponding instrumental, and the coupling tracks "Sora no Kanata e" (空の彼方へ / "Beyond the Sky") and "Kimi wa Nanika ga Dekiru" (君は何かが出来る / "You Can Do Something"). The DVD harbored the music video for "Umi", along with the video's behind-the-scenes making.

"Umi" was written and composed by the Japanese rock band MJ. The musical arrangement was done by Seiji Motoyama, who had worked with Lead with prior songs ("Summer Madness", "Drive Alive") and would continue to work with the group in the future. "Sore no Kanata e" was written and composed by Japanese musical composer Gajin (Masato Nakamura), who has also worked with the likes of KinKi Kids and AKB48. The music was performed by Seiji Motoyama, like the title track. "Kimi wa Nanika ga Dekiru," originally by the Japanese band 99Harmony, was composed by Toshiyuki Kimori and arranged by Akira Sasaki. The lyrical portion was written by Michio Yamagami.

== Promotional advertisements ==
To help promote the single, both "Umi" and the coupling tracks, "Sora no Kanata e" and "Kimi wa Nanika ga Dekiru", had promotional tie-ins.

"Umi" was utilized as the ending theme to the Japanese television series We Have Muscle! (いただきマッスル! / Itadaki Massuru) throughout the month of July.

"Kimi wa Nanika ga Dekiru" was the theme song to the film Captain, which was based on the manga of the same name. The song was originally performed by the band 99Harmony for the anime adaptation, which aired in the 1980s. "Sora no Kanata e" was also used as a tie-in for the film and played during one of the scenes.

== Track listing ==
CD
No.	Title	Lyrics	Music	Arranger(s)	Length
1.	"Umi" (海 / "Ocean")	MJ	Seiji Motoyama	MJ	5:23
2.	"Sora no Kanata e" (空の彼方へ / "Beyond the Sky")	Gajin	Seiji Motoyama	Gajin	4:25
3.	"Kimi wa Nanika ga Dekiru" (君は何かが出来る / "You Can Do Something")	Michio Yamagami	Akira Sasaki	Toshiyuki Kimori	3:10
4.	"Umi" (instrumental)		Seiji Motoyama	MJ	5:23
Total length:					18:21

DVD
No.	Title	Length
1.	"Umi" (music video)	5:38
2.	"Umi" (Off-shot video)	17:00
Total length:		22:38

== Charts ==
Release	Chart	Peak position
July 18, 2007	Oricon Weekly Singles Chart	27
