= Life on da Beat =

Studio album by Lead
- Released: April 23, 2003
- Recorded: 2002–2003
- Genre: Hip hop, pop
- Label: Flight Master

Lead chronology
| Buddies (2003) | Life on da Beat (2003) | Brand New Era (2004) |

Singles from Life on da Beat
- 1. "Manatsu no Magic" Released: July 31, 2002; 2. "Show Me the Way" Released: October 17, 2002; 3. "Fly Away" Released: February 5, 2003

Life on da Beat (stylized in Japan as "LIFE ON DA BEAT") is the debut studio album by Japanese hip-hop group Lead. It was released on April 23, 2003. The single debuted in the top five on the Oricon charts and stayed on the charts for five consecutive weeks. Bonuses with the album including one of five original stickers, tickets to one of five events, a chance to enter a t-shirt lottery and a leaflet that included a URL to download a special wallpaper.

Garnering popularity with their debut single Manatsu no Magic, the group had won the Best Newcomer Award at the 44th Japan Record Awards on December 31, 2002. The award helped their image and overall growing popularity as artists, leading into the success of their following singles and debut album. Life on Da Beat also includes a remix to their song "Step by Step," originally released on their single "Show Me the Way" in October of the previous year.

== Information ==
Life on da Beat is the debut studio album by Lead under the Pony Canyon sub-label Flight Master. The album was released on April 23, 2003, debuting in the top five of the Oricon Albums Charts at No. 5. It remained on the charts for five consecutive weeks, selling 30,214 copies during its run. The album had three singles prior to its release: "Manatsu no Magic", "Show Me the Way" and "Fly Away". Their success with their debut single, "Manatsu no Magic", helped them land the Best Newcomer Award during the 44th annual Japan Record Awards on December 31, 2002.

The album was released as a standalone CD, not carrying a DVD counterpart. The music videos for the tracks "Manatsu no Magic", "Show Me the Way" and "Fly Away" would not be released for purchase until the released of their first compilation DVD and VHS Lead Movies 1 on September 18 of the same year. The compilation would also include offshoots of the group, along with a documentary and the music video for their then-released song "Funky Days!". For the album, several bonuses were included. Buyers could receive one of five original stickers, tickets to one of five events, a chance to enter a t-shirt lottery and a leaflet that included a URL to download a special wallpaper.

Much of the music on the album was composed by musical composers Yasushi Sasamoto, Katsu and h-wonder. Yasushi is a member of the rap unit Banana Ice, which was formed in 1992. h-wonder is a famed musical arranger and composer throughout Japan, having worked with the likes of South Korean singer-songwriter BoA Kwon, Maaya Sakamoto and Kumi Koda. He debuted in 1995 as a soloist, but dropped his solo career to work with various artists in 1998. Although the members of Lead would work on their own material in the future, none of the songs from their debut album held their credit.

The song "Step by Step" (track #3) is a remix of the original version found on their "Show Me the Way" single. The remix was done by Gen Ittetsu, who is best known for his works with famous Japanese artist Gackt.

The tracks "One for da Soul" and "Be Happy" were used as promotional tracks to help promote the album. "One for da Soul" was used as the ending theme to the TV Tokyo anime series Bouken Yuuki Pluster World. "Be Happy" was used as the ending theme to NHK's television drama Tenshi Mitai between July 5, 2003, to September 20, 2003.

== Background and composition ==
"Manatsu no Magic" was written and composed by musical composer Yasushi Sasamoto. For "No Doubt", lyricist Katsu wrote most of the lyrics, while Yasushi wrote the lyrics for the rap. As with "Manatsu no Magic", Yasushi composed and arranged the piece. "Show Me the Way" was written and composed by musical composer Yasushi Sasamoto, who is part of the rap unit known as BANANA ICE. "Step by Step" was also composed by Yasushi, with the lyrics written by Kentaro Akutsu, while Katsu wrote the rap portion of the song.

"Fly Away" was written and composed by musical composer Yasushi Sasamoto. The strings arrangement was performed by Gen Ittetsu, who is best known for his works with famous Japanese soloist Gackt. The rap portion of the song was written by Katsu.

Much of the music made for the studio album Life on da Beat was composed by musical composers Yasushi Sasamoto, Katsu and h-wonder.

Yasushi is a member of the rap unit Banana Ice, which was formed in 1992. h-wonder is a famed musical arranger and composer throughout Japan, having worked with the likes of South Korean singer-songwriter BoA Kwon, Maaya Sakamoto and Kumi Koda. He debuted in 1995 as a soloist, but dropped his solo career to work with various artists in 1998.

Although the members of Lead would work on their own material in the future, none of the songs from their debut album held their credit.

== Promotional activities ==
"Manatsu no Magic" was used as the ending theme to several Nippon TV shows, and the ending theme to the theatrical film Juunana Sai (十七歳 / Seventeen Years). It was used as the ending theme to the drama Romei, the variety show Chanoma Girls, and the shows Anta ni Gurattsu~e! (あんたにグラッツェ！) and Tabi wa Higae Ritchi (旅は日帰リッチ).

"Fly Away" was used as the theme song to the movie Boutaoshi!, which the members of Lead also starred in. It was also used as the opening theme for the Tokyo Broadcasting System Television series Count Down TV throughout the month of February.

"One for da Soul" was used as the ending theme to the TV Tokyo anime series Bouken Yuuki Pluster World.

"Be Happy" was used as the ending theme to NHK's television drama Tenshi Mitai between July 5, 2003, and September 20, 2003.

== Track listing ==
Life on da Beat track listing
| No. | Title | Lyrics | Music | Arranger(s) | Length |
|---|---|---|---|---|---|
| 1. | "Prelude" | | bariken; Katsu | Katsu | 1:38 |
| 2. | "One for da Soul" | Yasushi Sasamoto | Katsu; Kentaro Akutsu | Yasushi Sasamoto | 3:45 |
| 3. | "Step by Step" (traditional groovin' mix) | Katsu; Kentaro Akutsu | Yasushi Sasamoto | Yasushi Sasamoto; Gen Ittetsu | 4:18 |
| 4. | "Manatsu no Magic" | Yasushi Sasamoto | Yasushi Sasamoto | Yasushi Sasamoto | 3:50 |
| 5. | "Love Rain" | Katsu | h-wonder | Yasushi Sasamoto | 4:26 |
| 6. | "Show Me the Way" | Yasushi Sasamoto | Yasushi Sasamoto | Yasushi Sasamoto | 4:03 |
| 7. | "Dōsen" (導線 / Wire) | Katsu | Yasushi Sasamoto | Katsu; Yasushi Sasamoto | 4:08 |
| 8. | "Be Happy" | Kentaro Akutsu | Yasushi Sasamoto | Yasushi Sasamoto | 4:39 |
| 9. | "Shake Up" | Motsu | Motsu; h-wonder | Motsu; h-wonder | 4:24 |
| 10. | "Eien no Ichi-byō" (永遠の一秒 / Eternal Second) | Kazuko Kobayashi; Katsu | Yasushi Sasamoto | Yasushi Sasamoto | 3:56 |
| 11. | "Fly Away" | Yasushi Sasamoto; Katsu | Yasushi Sasamoto; Gen Ittetsu | Yasushi Sasamoto | 5:04 |
| 12. | "Only You Can Hurt Me" | Makoto Atoji | h-wonder | gr8 master | 5:30 |
| 13. | "I Want Ya" | Yasushi Sasamoto | Yasushi Sasamoto; Yakon | Yasushi Sasamoto | 4:12 |
| Total length: | | | | | 53:53 |

== Charts ==
| Release | Chart | Peak position |
|---|---|---|
| April 23, 2003 | Oricon Weekly Albums Chart | 5 |
