= Lead! Heat! Beat! =

Studio album by Lead
- Released: August 10, 2005
- Recorded: 2004–2005
- Genre: Hip hop, pop, R&B
- Label: Flight Master

Lead chronology
Brand New Era (2004)	Lead! Heat! Beat! (2005)	4 (2006)

Singles from Lead! Heat! Beat!
- 1. "Tenohira o Taiyō ni / Delighted" Released: October 27, 2004; 2. "Atarashii Kisetsu e" Released: April 13, 2005; 3. "Baby Running Wild" Released: July 6, 2005

Lead! Heat! Beat! is the third studio album by the Japanese hip-hop group Lead. The album ranked No. 15 on Oricon and remained on the charts for four weeks. The album was released on August 10, 2005, nearly a year since their previous album, Brand New Era, and held three preceding singles: "Tenohira o Taiyō ni / Delighted", "Atarashii Kisetsu e" and "Baby Running Wild".

== Information ==
Lead! Heat! Beat! took the No. 15 spot on the weekly Oricon Albums Charts and remained on the charts for four consecutive weeks. It was released a year after their previous album, Brand New Era, released at the end of August 2004. Before its release, the album garnered three singles: the double A-side "Tenohira o Taiyō ni / Delighted", the spring ballad "Atarashii Kisetsu e" and the summer pop song "Baby Running Wild".

As with their previous albums, the album was only released as a standard CD, not carrying a CD+DVD counterpart. Instead, the music videos were later placed on their third compilation DVD Movies 3, which was released three years later on August 6, 2008. Unlike their previous albums, Lead! Heat! Beat! was not given a limited-edition version.

It became their first album to contain both a prelude and an outro, which were different renditions of "Rock the House!!". Along with the new tracks on the album, it also included a remix of "Baby Running Wild" as track #15.

On December 7, 2005, they would release their second concert DVD, which corresponding with the album Lead Live Tour Upturn 2005.

== Track listing ==
Lead! Heat! Beat! track listing
No.	Title	Lyrics	Music	Arranger(s)	Length
1.	"Rock the House!!" (roll start)	Shōko Fujibayashi • Mr. Blistah (rap)	Hayabusa	Hayabusa	1:36
2.	"Baby Running Wild"	Satori Shiraishi	Satori Shiraishi	Satori Shiraishi	2:45
3.	"Jump Around"	Shoko Fujibayashi • CLENCH&BLISTAH	Hayabusa • Masato Ishinari	Hayabusa	4:10
4.	"Love Magic"	Shoko Fujibayashi • Mr. Blistah	Takahiro Momiyama • Minoru Komorita • Masato Ishinari	Takahiro Momiyama • Minoru Komorita	3:52
5.	"Delighted"	Shōko Fujibayashi • Mr. Blistah (rap)	Tatsuyuki Okawa • Masato Ishinari	Tatsuyuki Okawa	4:33
6.	"Higher Revolution"	Zooco • K-WON (rap)	K-Muto • Zooco • Masato Ishinari	K-Muto	3:58
7.	"I Believe"	popY • Shinya Tanuichi (rap)	popY	popY	4:49
8.	"Prism" (プリズム)	Chokkyu Murano	Takuya Harada	Takuya Harada	4:32
9.	"Dear"	Makoto Furuya	Hiroo Yamaguchi	REO	4:58
10.	"High Time"	Shoko Fujibayashi	Yousuke Kobayashi • Takao Sugiyama	Nobuhito "UNA" Tanahashi • Yousuke Kobayashi	4:03
11.	"Best of My Lover"	Susumu Kawaguchi	Daisuke Tohyama • Masato Ishinari	Daisuke Tohyama	4:51
12.	"Atarashii Kisetsu e"	Kyogo Kawaguchi	Kyogo Kawaguchi • Yoshiaki Muto	Yoshiaki Muto • Yoshinobu Takeshita	6:14
13.	"Tenohira o Taiyō ni"	Takashi Yanase	Taku Izumi • Masato Ishinari	Hisashi Nawata	3:03
14.	"Rock the House!!" (roll end)	Shoko Fujibayashi • Mr. Blistah (rap)	Hayabusa	Hayabusa	1:16
15.	"Baby Running Wild" (Funny Honey Bunny Style)	Satori Shiraishi	Satori Shiraishi	Satori Shiraishi • Hayabusa	4:25

== Charts ==
Release	Chart	Peak position
August 10, 2005	Oricon Weekly Albums Chart	15
