= Feel the Vibes =

Studio album by Lead
- Released: March 5, 2008
- Recorded: 2007–2008
- Genre: Hip hop, pop, R&B
- Label: Pony Canyon

Lead chronology
4 (2006)	Feel the Vibes (2008)	Lead Tracks: Listener's Choice (2008)

Singles from Feel the Vibes
- 1. "Drive Alive" Released: March 14, 2007; 2. "Umi" Released: July 18, 2007; 3. "Stand Up!" Released: February 6, 2008

Feel the Vibes is the fifth studio album by Japanese hip hop group Lead, released on March 5, 2008. It became their lowest charting studio album, reaching No. 44 on the weekly Oricon charts and remaining on the charts for two weeks. It was their first album in nearly two years, their previous being 4, which was released in July 2006.

The album was preceded by three singles: "Drive Alive" (March 14, 2007), "Umi" (July 18, 2007) and "Stand Up!" (February 6, 2008). While "Drive Alive" charted well at No. 14 on the Oricon Singles Chart, the other two singles failed to break the top twenty.

== Information ==
Feel the Vibes was released two years after the group's previous studio album, 4, and five months before their first compilation album Lead Tracks: Listener's Choice, released in August the same year. The album became their lowest charting studio album, peaking at No. 44 on the Oricon Albums Chart, remaining on the chart for two consecutive weeks.

The album contained three preluding singles, "Drive Alive", "Umi" and "Stand Up!". "Drive Alive" reached No. 14 on the Oricon Singles Chart, but the others failed to break the top twenty, peaking at No. 27 and No. 20 respectively. Feel the Vibes was released as a standard CD, not carrying a CD+DVD counterpart. However, the music videos for "Drive Alive", "Umi" and "Stand Up!" were later released on the compilation DVD Lead Movies 3 (stylized as Lead MOVIES3) on August 6 alongside Lead Tracks ~listener's choice~. The album would also be given a limited edition release, which came with a photo book.

The album-exclusive tracks, "Baby What Turns You On", "Tokio Night" (TOKIO NIGHT) and "Wicked Wicked☆Summer Party" (Wicked Wicked☆SUMMER PARTY) were later chosen by fans to be placed on their album Lead Tracks ~listenere's choice~. The song "Tani☆RAP" (谷☆RAP) was written and composed by Lead's lead rapper Shinya Tanuichi, while both he and member Akira Kagimoto wrote the lyrical portion. The music was performed by DJ TAKU. Shinya also wrote the raps for the songs "Wicked Wicked Summer☆Party," "Tasogare Gradation" and "Thanks for...".

Feel the Vibes was their last studio album until the release of Now or Never on July 18, 2012.

== Track listing ==
Feel the Vibes track listing
No.	Title	Lyrics	Music	Arranger(s)	Length
1.	"The Vibes"	Chris Saiz; Iori Omura	Mizuho Hirata	Mizuho Hirata	1:41
2.	"Baby What Turns You On"	LL Brothers	LL Brothers	LL Brothers	3:06
3.	"Tokio Night"	shonen-JET	shonen-JET	shonen-JET	5:04
4.	"Umi"	MJ	Seiji Motoyama	MJ	5:24
5.	"Tani Rap" (谷 / Valley)	Shinya Tanuichi; Akira Kagimoto	DJ TAKU	Shinya Tanuichi	5:24
6.	"Stand Up!"	Lead	Seiji Motoyama	Seiji Motoyama	3:21
7.	"Wicked Wicked Summer Party"	Shōko Fujibayashi; Shinya Tanuichi	Shoko Fujibayashi	Shinya Tanuichi	3:32
8.	"Tasogare Gradation" (黄昏グラデーション / Twilight Gradation)	Shoko Fujibayashi; Shinya Tanuichi	Akira Sasaki	Akira Sasaki	4:17
9.	"Sleepin' Flower"	Shōko Fujibayashi	Akira Sasaki	Akira Sasaki	4:41
10.	"Taisetsu na Mono" (たいせつなもの / Important Things)	Chikayo Ezaki	Tatsuya Harada	Satoshi "ucchy" Uchida	4:21
11.	"Fall in Love"	LL Brothers	LL Brothers	LL Brothers	4:40
12.	"Get Dizzy"	kikko	Seiji Motoyama	Seiji Motoyama	3:27
13.	"Drive Alive"	Lisa	Y.T.H	Ken Iijima; Daisuke Kahara	3:30
14.	"Thanks For..."	Shinya Tanuichi; Kotaro Egami	Manao Doi	Kotaro Egami	4:09
15.	"Sora no Kanata e"	Gajin	Seiji Motoyama	Gajin	4:36
16.	"Feel"	Chris Saiz; Iori Omura	Mizuho Hirata	Mizuho Hirata	0:16
Total length:					61:29

== Charts ==
Release	Chart	Peak position
March 5, 2008	Oricon Weekly Albums Chart	44
