= Summer Madness (Lead song) =

Single by Lead

from the album 4
- B-side: "Boku ga Tsuki ni Inoru Yoru"; "One"
- Released: June 21, 2006
- Recorded: 2006
- Genre: J-Pop, hip hop
- Label: Flight Master; CD (PCCA-02278); CD+DVD (PCCA-02277)
- Songwriter(s): Nice Hashimoto • Yasunori Tanaka • yury • Yosuke Kobayashi • Koichi Tsutaya

Lead singles chronology
"Virgin Blue" (2006)	"Summer Madness" (2006)	"Drive Alive" (2007)

Alternative covers
- First Press Limited Edition

"Summer Madness" is the eleventh single by Japanese hip-hop group Lead, released on June 21, 2006, two weeks before their fourth studio album, 4. It failed to break the top ten on Oricon, but charted in the top twenty, taking the weekly ranking of #17, where it remained on the charts for five weeks.

The single contained two B-sides, "Boku ga Tsuki ni Inoru Yoru" and "One", the latter of which became popular enough to be placed on their first compilation album Lead Tracks: Listener's Choice.

== Information ==
"Summer Madness" peaked in the top twenty on the Oricon Singles Charts at #17 and remained on the charts for five consecutive weeks. The single was released as a standard CD and a CD+DVD combo, the latter of which was of limited release. The limited CD+DVD editions carried the corresponding music video for the title track, along with the making video. The single carried two coupling tracks on both the standard CD and limited CD+DVD edition, "Boku ga Tsuki ni Inoru Yoru" (僕が月に祈る夜 / The Night I Prayed to the Moon) and "One".

"Summer Madness" was written by musical composers Yasunori Tanaka and Nice Hashimoto, the latter who has worked with Japanese boy band SMAP and who wrote the lyrics for the track. The track was performed by Motonari Murakawa, who later went on to work with kawaii metal band BABYMETAL. "Boku ga Tsuki ni Inoru Yoru" was written and composed by Yosuke Kobayashi, who had previously worked with the group for their song "High Time", while lyricist yury wrote the lyrical portion. "One" was composed by Koichi Tsutaya, who had also written the lyrics, while the music was performed by Seiji Motoyama, who would go on to work with the group on their albums Feel the Vibes (2008), Now or Never (2012) and their most successful album The Showcase (2016).

"One" was later placed on their first greatest hits album, Lead Tracks: Listener's Choice, while the title track would later be placed on their Jacket B edition of their 2012 studio album Now or Never, which would also be their final album with their leader and lead vocalist Hiroki.

== Music video ==
The music video for "Summer Madness" was predominantly centered around the group, Hiroki, Shinya, Keita and Akira, on their way to and arriving at a beach. Sections of the video showed the members in front of a mall, while each performed solo vocals as the other members played in the background. Other clips featured them inside a mall, donning summer-themed attire while partaking in comedic moments.

Shinya's solo rap segments were filmed with him leaned against a palm tree during a sunset over the beach. Other segments featured a caucasian woman donning a bikini, with some of the shots panning between her legs to focus on the group.

The hotel shots were filmed at the Gram Hotel in Namyangju, South Korea.

The official video was uploaded to Lead's official YouTube six years later on March 3, 2012.

== Packaging ==
"Summer Madness" became Lead's third single to be released both as a standard CD and a CD+DVD combo, the priors being "Night Deluxe" (2004) and "Baby Runnin' Wild" (2005).

The standard CD carried the title track, the coupling tracks "Boku ga Tsuki ni Inoru Yoru" and "One" and the corresponding instrumental to "Summer Madness" (the others not receiving an instrumental rendition). The DVD on the first press limited edition contained both the music video and making video for the title track, "Summer Madness".

== Track listing ==
CD
No.	Title	Lyrics	Music	Arranger(s)	Length
1.	"Summer Madness"	Nice Hashimoto	Motonari Murakawa	Nice Hashimoto • Yasunori Tanaka	4:39
2.	"Boku ga Tsuki ni Inoru Yoru" (僕が月に祈る夜 / The Night I Prayed to the Moon)	yury	Yosuke Kobayashi	Yosuke Kobayashi	3:42
3.	"One"	Koichi Tsutaya	Seiji Motoyama	Koichi Tsutaya	3:57
4.	"Summer Madness" (Instrumental)		Motonari Murakawa	Nice Hashimoto • Yasunori Tanaka	4:35
Total length:					16:53

DVD
No.	Title	Length
1.	"Summer Madness" (Music Video)	4:47
2.	"Summer Madness" (Off-shot Video)	7:19
Total length:		12:06

== Charts ==
Release	Chart	Peak position
June 21, 2006	Oricon Weekly Singles Chart	17
