= 44th Japan Record Awards =

Annual music awards

- Date: 31 December 2002
- Venue: TBS B-Studio, Tokyo
- Hosted by: Masaaki Sakai, Rei Kikukawa

Television/radio coverage
- Network: TBS

The 44th Annual Japan Record Awards took place on 31 December 2002, starting at 6:00PM JST. The primary ceremonies were televised in Japan on TBS.

== Award winners ==
- Japan Record Award:
  - Max Matsuura (producer), CREA + D・A・I (composer) & Ayumi Hamasaki (songwriter, singer) for "Voyage"
- Best Vocalist:
  - Ryoko Moriyama
- Best New Artist:
  - Mika Nakashima
