= Kyogo Kawaguchi =

Japanese singer-songwriter (born 1974)

Kyogo Kawaguchi (河口 恭吾, Kawaguchi Kyōgo; born October 1, 1974, in Sano, Tochigi) is a Japanese singer-songwriter. He is currently working with "Chikyukyoudai" ("World Siblings"). His notable works include Sakura and the album Hibi Sansan.

== Singles ==
	Release Date	Title	Japanese
1st	October 4, 1995	Sekaijuu ga senchimentaru (Everybody is sentimental)	世界中がセンチメンタル
2nd	November 22, 2000	Mafuyu no tsuki (Midwinter moon)	真冬の月
3rd	February 21, 2002	Gabera	ガーベラ
4th	August 21, 2002	Omega no kioku (Memories of omega)	オメガの記憶
5th	April 30, 2003	Sakura (Cherry Blossom)	桜
6th	December 10, 2003	Sakura (Cherry Blossom)	桜
7th	May 19, 2004	Ai no uta (Song of Love)	愛の歌
8th	August 4, 2004	A Place In The Sun	A Place In The Sun
9th	August 25, 2004	Suiyoubi no asa (Wednesday Morning)	水曜日の朝
10th	February 16, 2005	Yume no mannnaka Mune no kotoba (The Middle of a Dream) / (The Words of my Heart)	夢の真ん中 胸の言葉
11th	August 24, 2005	Watashi no subete (All of Me)	私のすべて
12th	June 28, 2006	Honto wa shiawase (In truth, I'm happy)	ホントは幸せ
13th	August 23, 2006	Kaisha wo yamete tabini deyou (Let's Quit our Jobs and Go on a Journey)	会社をやめて旅に出よう
14th	December 27, 2006	Hikari; Tegami ( [?] / Letter)	景～hikari～ 手紙
15th	April 18, 2007	Koufuku no uta (Song of Happiness)	幸福の歌
16th	July 23, 2008	Tadaima (I'm Back)	ただいま－七夕篇－
17th	September 17, 2008	Tadaima (I'm back)	ただいま
18th	November 5, 2008	Miraiiropuropo-zu (Future-Coloured Proposal)	未来色プロポーズ
