= Show Me the Way (Lead song) =

Single by Lead

from the album Life on da Beat
- B-side: "Step by Step"; "Show Me the Way" (Led on Remix)
- Released: October 17, 2002
- Recorded: 2002
- Genre: J-Pop, hip hop
- Label: Flight Master
- Songwriter(s): Yasushi Sasamoto
- Producer(s): Yasushi Sasamoto

Lead singles chronology
"Manatsu no Magic" (2002)	"Show Me the Way" (2002)	"Fly Away" (2003)

"Show Me the Way" is the second single by the four-member Japanese hip-hop group Lead, released on October 17, 2002, under the Pony Canyon sub-label Flight Master. It charted better than their debut single, ranking in the top ten on the Oricon charts at #7.

"Show Me the Way" was the song that helped Lead secure the spot for Best Newcomer during the 44th annual Japan Record Awards at the end of 2002, alongside the band day after tomorrow, Mika Nakashima and Sachika Shino.

== Information ==
"Show Me the Way" debuted higher than their debut single, "Manatsu no Magic", breaking the top ten on the Oricon Singles Charts at #7, and it remained on the charts for six consecutive weeks. The success of this single and their previous single helped Lead to win the Best Newcomer award during the 44th Japan Record Awards alongside newbie band day after tomorrow and up-and-coming soloists Mika Nakashima and Sachika Shino.

The single was released as a standard CD, which contained the title track, the B-side "Step by Step" and a remix and instrumental to "Show me the way." While the music video was released for syndication to the public upon the single's release, it was not available for the public to purchase until their DVD/VHS release Lead Movies 1 in September 2003.

"Show Me the Way" was written and composed by musical composer Yasushi Sasamoto, who is part of the rap unit known as BANANA ICE. While the b-side, "Step by Step", was also composed by Yasushi, the lyrics to the piece were written by Kentaro Akutsu, while KATSU wrote the rap portion of the song. KATSU and Yasushi had previously worked with Lead for their prior single. The remix of "Show me the way" was done by Japanese music group COLDFEET, who debuted in 1998.

"Step by Step" would be given a remix on their debut studio album Life On Da Beat, which was released in April the following year. The remix would be rearranged by Gen Ittetsu, who is most famous for his works with legendary Japanese artist Gackt.

== Promotional advertisements ==
To help promote the single, Lead performed "Show Me the Way" on the Japanese talk show Hey!Hey!Hey! Music Champ.

Along with performing the song, they group appeared on the game show portion later on in the month. At the time of their appearances, Hiroki was seventeen, Shinya was fifteen and Keita and Akira were fourteen.

== Track listing ==
CD
No.	Title	Lyrics	Music	Arranger(s)	Length
1.	"Show me the way"	Yasushi Sasamoto	Yasushi Sasamoto	Yasushi Sasamoto	4:05
2.	"Step by Step"	Kentaro Akutsu • KATSU	Yasushi Sasamoto	Yasushi Sasamoto	4:01
3.	"Show me the way" (Led on Remix)	Yasushi Sasamoto	COLDFEET	COLDFEET	4:46
4.	"Show me the way" (Instrumental)		Yasushi Sasamoto	Yasushi Sasamoto	4:02
Total length:					16:54

== Charts ==
Release	Chart	Peak position
October 17, 2002	Oricon Weekly Singles Chart	7
