= Drive Alive =

Single by Lead

from the album Feel the Vibes
- B-side: "Get Dizzy!"; "Love & Everything"
- Released: March 14, 2007
- Recorded: 2007
- Genre: J-pop, hip hop
- Label: Flight Master
- Songwriter(s): Lisa; Kenji Ijima; Y.T.H; Daisuke Kahara; Kikko; Seiji Motoyama; H.U.B; Flying Grind
- Producer(s): Shiraishi Satori

Lead singles chronology
"Summer Madness" (2006)	"Drive Alive" (2007)	"Umi" (2007)

"Drive Alive" is the twelfth domestic single by Japanese hip-hop group Lead. It peaked at #14 on the Oricon weekly charts, remaining on the charts for three weeks.

The single was released as both a standard CD and a limited edition CD+DVD combo.

== Information ==
"Drive Alive" charted well on the Oricon Singles Chart at #14, and remained on the charts for three consecutive weeks. Limited editions of the single included a chance to meet the members of Lead during a participation event at Zepp Tokyo on March 18, 2007, and one of five possible photographs.

"Drive Alive" was released as both a standard CD and a limited edition CD+DVD combination. While both editions contained the title track, the b-sides "Get Dizzy!" and "Love & Everything", along with the instrumental to the title track, the DVD harbored the music video of "Drive Alive" and the behind-the-scenes making video of the single.

"Drive Alive" was written by Kenji Ijima and Daisuke Kahara, while the music was performed by Y.T.H. "Get Dizzy!" was written and composed by Seiji Motoyama. The final coupling track, "Love & Everything", was written and composed by the duo Flying Grind, which is made up of Kengo Otani and Naoki Utsugi.

"Drive Alive" was used as the theme song for the television show Uta Sutaa!! (歌スタ!! / Star Singer!!) during the month of March.

== Background and composition ==
"Drive Alive" was written by Kenji Ijima and Daisuke Kahara, while the music was performed by Y.T.H. Daisuke is known for his work with singer Kokia, whereas he wrote much of the music for her Uta ga Chikara album.

"Get Dizzy!" was written and composed by Seiji Motoyama, who has worked with the likes of South Korean singer Juno and group CNBLUE. The final coupling track, "Love & Everything", was written and composed by the duo Flying Grind, which is made up of Kengo Otani and Naoki Utsugi.

== Packaging ==
"Drive Alive" was released as both a standard CD and a CD+DVD combo. The CD+DVD was of limited edition, while the CD is still available. Both editions held the same material on the CD: the title track, the b-sides "Get Dizzy!" and "Love & Everything", and the corresponding instrumental to "Drive Alive".

The limited edition DVD housed the music video to the title track, along with the making video.

== Track listing ==
CD
No.	Title	Lyrics	Music	Arranger(s)	Length
1.	"Drive Alive"	Lisa	Y.T.H	Kenji Ijima • Daisuke Kahara	3:31
2.	"Get Dizzy!"	Kikko	Seiji Motoyama	Seiji Motoyama	3:26
3.	"Love & Everything"	H.U.B	Flying Grind	Flying Grind	4:43
4.	"Drive Alive" (instrumental)		Y.T.H	Kenji Ijima • Daisuke Kahara	3:31
Total length:					15:11

DVD
No.	Title	Length
1.	"Drive Alive" (music video)
2.	"Drive Alive" (Off-Shot video)

== Charts ==
Release	Chart	Peak position
March 26, 2007	Oricon Weekly Singles Chart	14
