= Baby Running Wild =

Single by Lead

from the album Lead! Heat! Beat!
- B-side: "Summer Splash"
- Released: July 6, 2005
- Recorded: 2005
- Genre: J-pop, hip hop
- Label: Flight Master
- Songwriters: Satori Shiraishi; Shōko Fujibayashi; Akira Sasaki

Lead singles chronology
"Atarashii Kisetsu e" (2005)	"Baby Running Wild" (2005)	"Virgin Blue" (2006)

"Baby Running Wild" (ベイビーランニンワイルド / Beibii Rannin Wairudo) is the ninth single by Japanese hip-hop group Lead. The single peaked on Oricon at #11 and remained on the charts for three weeks.

The single was released as a limited edition CD+DVD and a standard CD only edition. This was the first time since "Night Deluxe" where the group released a CD+DVD combo.

== Information ==
"Baby Running Wild" charted in the top twenty on Oricon at #11 on the Oricon Singles Chart, remaining on the charts for three consecutive weeks.

"Baby Running Wild" became their second single to be released as both a standard CD and a CD+DVD combo, although the latter edition was of limited release. The other single to contain a combo edition was "Night Deluxe", which was released a year prior.

The title track was written and composed by Japanese musical composer and lyricist Satori Shiraishi. The coupling track, "Summer Splash," had its lyrics written by Shōko Fujibayashi, who had worked with Lead for their song "Night Deluxe" the previous year. The arrangement and composition was performed by Akira Sasaki.

== Packaging ==
"Baby Running Wild" became Lead's second single to be released as both a standard CD and a CD+DVD combo. The CD+DVD was of limited edition, while the CD is still available. Both editions held the same material on the CD: the title track, the B-side "Summer Splash", and their corresponding instrumentals.

However, instead of carrying the making video to "Baby Running Wild" like "Night Deluxe", the DVD contained the music video. The video would later be released on their compilation DVD Lead Movies 3 in 2008.

== Track listing ==
CD
No.	Title	Lyrics	Music	Length
1.	"Baby Running Wild"	Satori Shiraishi	Satori Shiraishi	2:47
2.	"Summer Splash"	Shōko Fujibayashi	Akira Sasaki	4:34
3.	"Baby Running Wild" (instrumental)		Satori Shiraishi	2:47
4.	"Summer Splash" (instrumental)		Akira Sasaki	4:32
Total length:				14:40

DVD
No.	Title	Length
1.	"Baby Running Wild" (music video)	3:07

== Charts ==
Release	Chart	Peak position
July 6, 2005	Oricon Weekly Singles Chart	11
