= Manatsu no Magic =

Single by Lead

from the album Life on da Beat
- B-side: "No Doubt"; "Manatsu no Magic" (Moch² Brandnew Club Track)
- Released: July 31, 2002
- Recorded: 2002
- Genre: J-pop, hip hop
- Label: Flight Master
- Songwriter: Yasushi Sasamoto
- Producer: Yasushi Sasamoto

Lead singles chronology
| "Manatsu no Magic" (2002) | "Show me the way" (2002) |

"Manatsu no Magic" (真夏のMagic; lit. "Midsummer Magic") is the debut single by Japanese hip-hop group Lead released on July 31, 2002, under the Pony Canyon sub-label Flight Master. The single debuted on Oricon at #18 and remained on the charts for five weeks. The success of the single and their following single, "Show Me the Way", helped them win the Best Newcomer Award during the 44th Japan Record Awards, alongside Day After Tomorrow, Mika Nakashima and Sachika Shino.

== Information ==
"Manatsu no Magic" debuted in the top twenty of the Oricon Singles Charts, coming in at #18 and remaining on the charts for five consecutive weeks. The success of the single, along with their following single, "Show Me the Way", helped Lead secure the Best Newcomer Award during the 44th annual Japan Record Awards alongside newbie band day after tomorrow and up-and-coming soloists Mika Nakashima and Sachika Shino.

The single was only released as a standard CD, which contained the title track, the b-side "No Doubt" and a remix and instrumental for "Manatsu no Magic". While the music video was released for syndication to the public upon the single's release, it was not available for the public to purchase until their DVD/VHS release Lead Movies 1 in September 2003.

"Manatsu no Magic" was written and composed by musical composer Yasushi Sasamoto. For "No Doubt", lyricist Katsu wrote most of the lyrics, while Yasushi wrote the lyrics for the rap. As with "Manatsu no Magic", Yasushi composed and arranged the piece. The remix of "Manatsu no Magic" was reworked by famous composer H-Wonder, who has worked with the likes of Kumi Koda, BoA, TVXQ and AAA.

== Promotional activities ==
To help promote their single, "Manatsu no Magic" was used as the ending theme to several Nippon TV shows and the ending theme to the theatrical film Juunana Sai (十七歳 / Seventeen Years).

The song was used as the ending theme to several television shows, including the drama Romei, the variety show Chanoma Girls, and the shows Anta ni Gurattsu~e! (あんたにグラッツェ！ / Thanks for You!) and Tabi wa Higae Ritchi (旅は日帰リッチ / Travel is a rich day trip).

== Track listing ==
"Manatsu no Magic" track listing
| No. | Title | Lyrics | Music | Arranger(s) | Length |
|---|---|---|---|---|---|
| 1. | "Manatsu no Magic" (真夏のMagic / Midsummer Magic) | Yasushi Sasamoto | Yasushi Sasamoto | Yasushi Sasamoto | 3:52 |
| 2. | "No doubt" | Yasushi Sasamoto • KATSU | Yasushi Sasamoto | Yasushi Sasamoto | 3:55 |
| 3. | "Manatsu no Magic" (MOCH² BRANDNEW CLUB TRACK) | Yasushi Sasamoto | h-wonder | h-wonder | 4:20 |
| 4. | "Manatsu no Magic" (Instrumental) | | Yasushi Sasamoto | Yasushi Sasamoto | 3:48 |
| Total length: | | | | | 15:55 |

== Charts ==
| Release | Chart | Peak position | Total sales |
|---|---|---|---|
| July 31, 2002 | Oricon Singles Chart | 18 | 27,330 |
