= Lead Upturn 2021 Online Live: Sonic Boom & GuiDance =

Video by Lead
- Released: March 30, 2022
- Recorded: 2021
- Genre: Pop, hip hop
- Label: Pony Canyon

Lead chronology
Lead Upturn 2020 Online Live: Trick or Lead with Movies 5 (2020)	Lead Upturn 2021 Online Live: Sonic Boom & GuiDance (2022)	Lead 20th Anniversary Live: Kankin Dousai & Snow Magic (2023)

Lead Upturn 2021 Online Live: Sonic Boom & GuiDance (stylized as Lead Upturn 2021 ONLINE LIVE ～Sonic Boom & GuiDance~) is the eighteenth concert video released by Japanese hip-hop group Lead. The concert video was released on the 30th of March, 2022. It debuted at No. 12 on the Oricon DVD charts.

The concerts was performed without a live audience due to the COVID-19 pandemic in Japan.

== Information ==
Lead Upturn 2021 Online Live ~Sonic Boom & GuiDance~ is the eighteenth concert video released by Lead. It debuted at No. 12 on the Oricon DVD charts. It charted at No. 28 on the DVD charts and No. 43 on the Blu-ray charts for the first week.

The set was released on 2DVD and 2Blu-ray, with each performance being housed on a separate disc. Preorders included one of three posters based on a first-come, first-served basis.

Lead Upturn 2021 Online Live ~Sonic Boom~ and Lead Online Live 2021 ~GuiDance~ were filmed without the presence of a live audience due to COVID-19 precautions. Lead Upturn 2021 Online Live ~Sonic Boom~ was filmed on December 10, 2021 at Tokyo Totemono Brillia Hall at the "harevutai" theater, which is a modernized concert hall made for CG lives. Lead Online Live 2021 ~GuiDance~ was filmed at Zepp Tokyo on April 11, 2021.

Their Upturn 2021 Online Live ~Sonic Boom~ became their second concert to not be filmed at the Nakano Sun Plaza, their previous 2020 Upturn performance being the first. Though the concert did not correspond with an album, it did correspond with their thirty-fourth single Sonic Boom. The concert was self-produced by the members of Lead and fellow crewmembers. The concert held their first live performances of the songs from their Sonic Boom single, including the title track and the coupling tracks "Te Quiero Mucho" and "Get Over." The trio also performed songs from their debut album Life On Da Beat, along with several older songs.

During their Online Live 2021 ~GuiDance~ performance, they performed "Magic Magic Magic", "Seasons" and "Milk Tea" from their Singularity studio album for the first time live.

== Track listing ==
- DVD1: Lead Online Live 2021 ~GuiDance~
1. "Depend on Me"
2. "Midnight freeway"
3. "Hide and Seek"
4. "Anthem"
5. "Summer Vacation"
6. "Dance Corner"
7. "Dousen"
8. "Magic Magic Magic"
9. "Seasons"
10. "Milk Tea"
11. "Can't Stop Loving You"
12. "Singularity"
13. "Wanna Be With You"
  -After Show-
14. "Fairy tale"
15. "Tuxedo"
- DVD2: Lead Upturn 2021 Online Live ~Sonic Boom~
1. "Game"
2. "Drop in the box"
3. "Be the Naked"
4. "Te Quiero Mucho"
5. "What cha gonna?"
6. "Burning Up!"
7. "Kore Made, Kore Kara"
8. "Dilemma"
9. "Still"
10. "Midnight freeway"
11. "Fuyuiro Girl"
12. "Milk Tea"
13. "Step by Step"
14. "Sonic Boom"
  -Encore-
15. "Get Over"
16. "Beautiful Day"

== Charts ==
Oricon DVD Charts
Release	Chart	Peak position
March 30, 2022	Oricon Daily Chart	12
March 30, 2022	Oricon Weekly Chart	27

Oricon Blu-ray Charts
Release	Chart	Peak position
March 30, 2022	Oricon Weekly Chart	43
