= Lead Upturn 2016: The Showcase =

2016 concert film by Lead

Video by Lead
- Released: December 21, 2016
- Recorded: 2016
- Genre: Pop, hip hop
- Label: Pony Canyon; DVD (PCBP-53157); Blu-ray (PCXP-50450)

Lead chronology
Lead Upturn 2015: Master Plan (2015)	Lead Upturn 2016: The Showcase (2016)	Lead 15th Anniversary Live Box (2017)

Lead Upturn 2016 ～The Showcase～ (stylized as Lead Upturn 2016 ～THE SHOWCASE～) is the thirteenth concert video released by the Japanese hip-hop group Lead. The video was released on December 21, 2016. It took the #57 spot during its first week on the Oricon DVD charts and remained on the charts for two weeks.

The tour corresponded with their seventh studio album, The Showcase, along with songs from previous albums, including "Virgin Blue" from 4 (2006) and the then-unreleased song "Dilemma", which would later be released on a future single.

== Information ==
Lead Upturn 2016 ～The Showcase～ is the thirteenth concert video released by the Japanese hip-hop group Lead. The video was released on December 21, 2016 on both DVD and Blu-ray. It took #57 on the Oricon DVD charts and #90 on the Oricon Blu-ray charts, remaining on the charts for two weeks and one week respectively.

The DVD included a collection of MCs showing off their skills, while the Blu-ray carried behind-the-scene footage of the tour's finale. For those who purchased the concert video, there was one of two probable items: a ticket to Lead's New Year's Party in Tokyo in January, or a special tour good.

The tour became their first in four years to correspond with the release of an album, their previous being 10th Anniversary Tour Lead Upturn 2012 ～Now or Never～, corresponding with their seventh studio album The Showcase.

With the album having been put together in order the group intended to perform the songs, most of the tracks were performed in the order released, only broken up occasionally by songs from singles released throughout the era. The concept of the tour was to give the members a challenge, whereas they performed various genres previously unreleased. The group only performed two songs outside of those released post Now or Never through The Showcase; the song "Virgin Blue" from the album 4 (2006), and their then-unreleased song "Dilemma", which would later be released on their 2017 single Tokyo Fever.

The performance utilized on the DVD and Blu-ray was of their finale at Nakano Sun Plaza in Nakano, Tokyo on September 10, 2016.

== Track listing ==
1. "Opening"
2. "Loud! Loud! Loud!"
3. "Let's Get On It"
4. "Moonlight Shower"
5. "Game"
6. "Stand by me"
7. "Dilemma"
8. "Zoom up"
  <DANCE CORNER>
9. "Green Days"
10. "Virgin Blue"
11. "Summer Love Story"
12. "Amazing"
13. "You're the only one"
14. "Wake me up"
15. "Kokorozashi ~KO.KO.RO.ZA.SHI~"
16. "It's My Style"
17. "Just do it"
  <ENCORE>
18. "Stand Up Action"
19. "Giant Steps"
  Bonus Footage
20. "MC Footage"*
21. "Behind-the-Scenes"**

(*DVD only)
(**Blu-ray only)

== Charts (Japan) ==
Release	Chart	Peak position
December 21, 2018	Oricon DVD Chart	57
December 21, 2018	Oricon Blu-ray Chart	90
