= Hinomaru Sumo =

Japanese manga series

- First tankōbon volume cover, featuring Hinomaru Ushio

火ノ丸相撲 (Hinomaru Zumō)
- Genre: Sports
- Manga
- Written by: Kawada
- Published by: Shueisha
- Imprint: Jump Comics
- Magazine: Weekly Shōnen Jump
- Original run: May 26, 2014 – July 22, 2019
- Volumes: 28
- Anime television series
- Directed by: Kōnosuke Uda; Yasutaka Yamamoto
- Studio: Gonzo
- Licensed by: Crunchyroll; NA: Funimation; SEA: Muse Communication
- Original network: Tokyo MX, BS11, SUN, TVA, TYQ
- Original run: October 5, 2018 – March 29, 2019
- Episodes: 24
- icon

Hinomaru Sumo (Japanese: 火ノ丸相撲, Hepburn: Hinomaru Zumō) is a Japanese sumo manga series written and illustrated by Kawada. It was serialized in Shueisha's shōnen manga magazine Weekly Shōnen Jump from May 2014 to July 2019, with its chapters collected into 28 tankōbon volumes by Shueisha. A 24-episode anime television series adaptation produced by Gonzo aired from October 2018 to March 2019.

== Plot summary ==
On his first day of high school, sumo practitioner Hinomaru Ushio joins Odachi High's sumo club. Despite his short stature (professional sumo has a height requirement of 167 centimeters (5.5 feet)), Hinomaru aims to become the best in high school to force the professional sumo association to let him compete, and then reach the sport's highest rank of yokozuna. However, the club's captain and only other member, third year student Shinya Ozeki, informs him that delinquents have taken over their dojo. Hinomaru challenges their leader and "strongest" student at the school, Yuma Gojo, to a fight to take back the dojo, and beats him with one hit. Humbled, Yuma also joins the sumo club after being dragged to a practice match by Hinomaru and seeing how strong the wrestlers are. They compete in a local three-man team tournament, but are knocked out by Ishigami High School. In order to avoid having the club shut down, they recruit two more members during the two-day cultural festival; the national wrestling champion Chihiro Kunisaki, and the small, unathletic Kei Mitsuhashi.

The members of Odachi High's sumo club then enter the Kantō newcomer tournament, which is fought one-on-one, where Chihiro, Yuma and Hinomaru are all defeated by the return of the prodigy Sōsuke Kuze. Hinomaru's childhood friend Kirihito Tsuji enters Odachi High and becomes the coach of the sumo club. Tsuji devises training regimens for each member, including having Hinomaru train with professionals at Shibakiyama stable, to get them ready for the Chiba preliminaries of the Inter High Tournament. At the preliminaries, Odachi High defeats Ishigami High in the team finals earning a spot at the nationals, while Hinomaru wins the individual tournament. Shibakiyama invites Odachi High to Nagoya to train with professionals, where Hinomaru gets special training with sekitori and former yokozuna Shunkai Tokio. On the first day of the national Inter High Tournament at Ryōgoku Kokugikan, Hinomaru is eliminated from the individual competition by reigning champion Shido Tennoji and injures his arm. With Hinomaru out for the rest of the day, Odachi High advances in the first two rounds of the team competition without him. On the third and final day, Odachi High and Hinomaru defeat Tottori Hakurou High and Tennoji in the semifinals, before defeating Eiga University High and Kuze in the finals to become the national champions.

Three and a half years later, Hinomaru is returning to the top makuuchi division of professional sumo after having suffered a serious injury to his right arm two years earlier. During the July tournament in Nagoya, Hinomaru defeats Tsuji before Mongolian yokozuna Jin'o, who has reigned at the top of the sport for the last decade, wins his 44th championship and announces he will retire if he wins the next one due to a lack of competition. This lights a fire within the young Japanese wrestlers and they organize a training camp together in Gifu Prefecture in order to defeat him. After Hinomaru loses on the second and third days of the September tournament, including once to Jin'o, the old Odachi High sumo club reunites to help him strategize and stays to support him. On national television after defeating ōzeki Kinkaizan, Hinomaru proposes that he and Reina marry after the tournament. Hinomaru goes undefeated for the rest of the tournament and defeats Ozeki on the 15th and final day. Although Jin'o is initially ruled the winner of his final day bout with Kuze, Tennoji calls a mono-ii and the decision is overturned into a win for Kuze. This forces the need for a playoff between four wrestlers with 13–2 records. Jin'o defeats his stablemate Akihira Kano, and Hinomaru defeats his stablemate Norihiro Saenoyama. Hinomaru then defeats yokozuna Jin'o to win the September tournament. In the epilogue six months later, Hinomaru and Reina have gotten married and he is still competing in the top division.

== Characters ==
=== Odachi High School ===
Hinomaru Ushio (潮 火ノ丸, Ushio Hinomaru)
Voiced by: Takuya Eguchi (vomic), Atsushi Abe (anime) (Japanese); Ricco Fajardo (English)
A two-time yokozuna champion in elementary school due to his natural talent, he was given the epithet National Treasure "Onimaru Kunitsuna" (鬼丸国綱). But his career stalled in junior high due to his diminutive size of 152 cm (5 ft), and he left competitive sumo after suffering his third-consecutive loss. He decides to make his return in high school three years later. Despite his size, he is extremely muscular and fights using "yokozuna-style" sumo, which sees him attacking his opponents head-on with better leverage due to a far lower center of gravity. This, combined with his gung-ho attitude and scant regard for health and safety, often puts him in harm's way. He is known for his right underarm throw: the Demon Wheel (鬼車). After finishing third in the All-Japan Championship during his first year of high school, he leaves school and enters professional sumo via sandanme tsukedashi, which allows him to bypass the height requirement. He joins Shibakiyama stable and uses his epithet as his shikona. He reaches west maegashira 3.
Shinya Ozeki (小関 信也, Ozeki Shinya)
Voiced by: Taishi Murata (vomic), Fukushi Ochiai (anime) (Japanese); Tyson Rinehart (English)
A third year high school student at Odachi High and captain of its sumo club, and the only member of the club before Hinomaru joins. Known for his mental fortitude, Ozeki has great lower body strength. Despite being the most senior member of the team, he lacks actual match experience and has never won a real bout in five years. After high school he becomes a professional sumo wrestler affiliated with the Nagato stable so that he can face Hinomaru; if they were members of the same stable they would not be allowed to fight each other. He uses the shikona Tarōtachi Shinya (太郎太刀 信也). He reaches west maegashira 16, and receives the Fighting Spirit prize in the September tournament.
Yuma Gojo (五條 佑真, Gojō Yūma)
Voiced by: Shunsuke Takeuchi (vomic), Kentarō Kumagai (anime) (Japanese); Brandon Potter (English)
A third year high school student and former Kanto regional karate champion in junior high school, who is feared as the strongest at Odachi High. His delinquent actions had him expelled from his karate dojo and he led the group that took over the sumo club's dojo and destroyed Ozeki's meticulously prepared sumo ring. He takes up sumo after being humbled by Hinomaru's strength and hardworking attitude despite being smaller than everyone else, and aims to makeup for what he did to Ozeki. With his karate and fist-fighting background, he uses oshi-zumō; pushing and thrusting. After reforming, his sensei welcomes him back into karate and trains him in techniques that supplement sumo. Despite his delinquency, he is among the top 30 students of his grade academically. He is the older brother of Reina. He continues sumo in university. In Part 2, he is studying medicine and apprenticing under Dr. Kanie.
Chihiro Kunisaki (國崎 千比路, Kunisaki Chihiro)
Voiced by: Takuya Satō (Japanese); Marcus Stimac (English)
Second year student and last year's national wrestling champion, who is known for wearing a lucha libre mask and nasal tape. He is the only member of the wrestling club as everyone else quit because he is too strict. He aims to become the best mixed-martial artist and challenges members of other combat sports clubs to exhibition matches. He quits wrestling and joins the sumo club after conceding defeat to Hinomaru in a special match where each combatant followed the rules of their own sport. A phenom with great natural talent, he utilizes his wrestling background in sumo by performing throwing techniques. Academically speaking, he has the worst grades on the team. After his second year of high school, he goes to America to enter MMA. When he returns to Japan in Part 2, he is the champion of a small MMA promotion and a new single father. Chihiro also appears in Kawada's Martial Master Asumi manga series, alongside his now-teenage daughter, Okome (オコメ).
Kei Mitsuhashi (三ツ橋 蛍, Mitsuhashi Kei)
Voiced by: Ayumu Murase (Japanese); Stephen Fu (English)
The newest and weakest member of the Odachi High sumo club, who was inspired to join after watching the match between Hinomaru and Chihiro. Small, physically weak and timid, he focuses on feints and negating opponent's momentum shifts in order to compensate for his disadvantages. In Part 2, he becomes more confident and is very popular with women.
Kirihito Tsuji (辻 喜仁, Tsuji Kirihito)
Voiced by: Takuma Terashima (Japanese); Adam Gibbs (English)
A first year student at Odachi High, who enters school and the sumo club late due to being in the hospital. He was an elementary school friend of Hinomaru's and was on his same level of skill when they trained together at the same dojo, but they have not seen each other in over three years. He moved away to be closer to a hospital and gave up on sumo. After seeing Hinomaru continue to defy his fate, Tsuji vowed to help his old friend. Despite retaining his skills from elementary school, he can only fight in 20-second bursts due to impaired lung function caused by a birth defect. Because of this, he becomes the coach of the Odachi High sumo team and not a wrestler. His technical knowledge helps train the club members' technique and core strength, and identify their weaknesses and how to compensate for them. When Hinomaru got injured in Part 2, Tsuji decided to leave high school and enter professional sumo, where his 20-second limit is less of an impairment since pros only fight once a day. Like Ozeki, he joined Nagato stable so that he can face Hinomaru. He uses "Onikiri Yasutsuna" (鬼切 安綱) as his shikona, and reaches east maegashira 17.
Reina Gojo (五條 礼奈, Gojo Reina)
Voiced by: Mikako Komatsu (Japanese); Jad Saxton (English)
Vice president of the student council and Miss Odachi High for the last two years. Like her brother Yuma, she initially views sumo as a weird sport and plans to disband the club if they can not recruit two more members for a team of five by the end of the two-day cultural festival. But after continually watching the team to support Yuma, she is inspired by their hard work and, when Chizuko asks to be the manager of the club, Reina becomes a co-manager alongside her. In Part 2, she is a third year university student. She also accepts her feelings for Hinomaru and, with help from all of their friends, they start dating. She becomes friendly with Jin'o's wife, Yumi, to learn the duties of a professional sumo wrestler's wife.
Chizuko Hori (堀 千鶴子, Hori Chizuko)
Voiced by: Rui Tanabe (Japanese); Felecia Angelle (English)
First year student at Odachi High, she is saved by Hinomaru on the first day of school when he confronts a molester on the train. After the sumo club passes the preliminaries to enter the national tournament and earns respect at school, she becomes a co-manager of the sumo club alongside Reina. A quiet introvert, she was inspired by Hinomaru to change and develops a crush on him. In Part 2, she is a second year university student working as an assistant photographer for Gekkan Sumo Dō magazine. At the end of the series she seems to have developed feelings for Saenoyama.

=== Ishigami High School ===
Mizuki Sada (沙田美月, Sada Mizuki)
Voiced by: Kaito Ishikawa (Japanese); Alejandro Saab (English)
A first year student at Ishigami High who is considered the ace of the team. He began sumo in junior high, where he was last year's champion, and is known under the epithet "Mikazuki Munechika" (三日月 宗近). He is recognized by Hinomaru as one of his rivals to become the best in Japan. Despite his aloof personality, his relaxed attitude helps him dodge attacks. His attacks rely on arm holds, ottsuke, so nobody can touch his mawashi, and he is so successful at it, that his mawashi is known for being spotless. In his third year, he was captain of the club and became high school yokozuna. As a professional sumo wrestler, he joined Minagawa stable and uses his epithet as his shikona. He reaches west maegashira 2, and receives the Technique prize in the September tournament.
Tsuyoshi Kanamori (金盛 剛, Kanamori Tsuyoshi)
Voiced by: Subaru Kimura (Japanese); David Wald (English)
A third year student at Ishigami High and captain of its sumo club. 189 cm (6.2 ft) tall and 138 kilograms (304 pounds) with several scars on his forehead and lip, he is nicknamed "Hercules" due to his strength and muscular physique. He has a serious personality. His favorite grip is migi-yotsu; right hand inside on his opponent's mawashi.
Yūki Sanada (真田勇気, Sanada Yūki)
Voiced by: Yoshito (Japanese); Anthony Bowling (English)
Third year student and member of the Ishigami sumo club, he wears glasses and has noticeable freckles on both cheeks. Although appearing polite to outsiders, he can be intimidating to his teammates as he was formerly the strongest delinquent at the school. He falls into the background around Sada and Kanamori, but he too is good on the national level. He is not above confusing his opponents with intentional false starts.
Gennosuke Araki (荒木源之助, Araki Gennosuke)
Voiced by: Daisuke Namikawa (Japanese); Jarrod Greene (English)
A first year student of Ishigami High, with a history of delinquency, and a member of its sumo club. He was last year's national judo champion in junior high school, and like Chihiro, aims to become the best mixed martial artist.
Keiichi Mamiya (間宮圭一, Mamiya Keiichi)
Voiced by: Hiroki Matsukawa (Japanese); Ray Hurd (English)
A second year student at Ishigami High, he is the heaviest member of their sumo club. At 182 cm (6 ft) and 166 kg (366 lb) he is described as being as immovable as a mountain. He specializes in grabbing, lifting and throwing his opponents by their mawashi. After the Chiba preliminaries of the Inter High Tournament, Mamiya becomes the new captain of the club.

=== Eiga University High School ===
Sōsuke Kuze (久世 草介, Kuze Sōsuke)
Voiced by: Shunsuke Takeuchi (Japanese); Ian Sinclair (English)
First year student at Eiga University High School and son of Yamatokuni, the last Japanese-born yokozuna. He stands 195 cm (6.4 ft), has very long hair that reaches down to his lower back, and was given the epithet National Treasure, "Kusanagi no Tsurugi" (草薙剣), but has not fought in the last six years due to his father's orders. During his first tournament in his fourth year of elementary school, he seriously injured his opponent, so his father forbade him from competing so as not to smother out any young promising stars. Sōsuke is signed up for the Kantō region's newcomer tournament against his will by Shun. Although he plans not to partake, after seeing Shun's match against Hinomaru, Sōsuke's desire to compete is awakened again and he wins the tournament. He enters professional sumo right after winning the Inter High individual tournament, leaving high school in his first year to join his father's stable under the shikona Kusanagi Sōsuke (草薙 草介). In Part 2, he reaches east ōzeki.
Shun Kariya (狩谷 俊, Kariya Shun)
Voiced by: Takuto Yoshinaga (Japanese); Justin Briner (English)
First year student at Eiga High, where he is the shortest and lightest person in the sumo club. He is Sōsuke's childhood friend and the one whom Sōsuke severely injured six years earlier. He enjoys trash-talking, and in junior high school was the lightweight champion and in the top eight of the open-weight class. He admired Yamatokuni and originally used the same head-on yokozuna-style of sumo, but unlike fellow small wrestler Hinomaru, Shun abandoned it for a more technical and agility-based style when his small stature prevented it from being effective. He gets low and inside his opponent's guard at the initial charge and gets them off-balance. He detests Hinomaru for being able to continue to use the style that he had to give up. In Part 2, he quit sumo due to injuries and is manager of Eiga University's sumo club.
Masato Hyōdō (兵藤真磋人, Masato Hyōdō)
Voiced by: Daisuke Ono (Japanese); Bryan Massey (English)
Third year student at Eiga High and Chihiro's older brother, who has been practicing sumo for two years. He has long hair and a horizontal scar across his nose. When their parents divorced while they were in elementary school, Chihiro was raised by their mother and Masato was raised by their father. He is extremely capable at anything he puts his mind to, but his loud mouth and unpredictable behavior makes him seem like an idiot. His favorite pastime was to take up any activity Chihiro did, become better at it than him, then abandon it to try something else. But he fell in love with sumo after taking part in a match and being defeated. As a professional sumo wrestler, he joined Minagawa stable and goes by the shikona Daihannya Nagamitsu (大般若 長光). He reaches east maegashira 4.
Jin Yomoda (四方田 尽, Yomoda Jin)
Voiced by: Noriaki Sugiyama (Japanese); Howard Wang (English)
Third year student at Eiga High, and captain of the sumo club. He stands 184 cm (6 ft), and weighs 165 kg (364 lb). Despite his imposing size, he is a soft-spoken person who complains a lot. As a professional, he joined Asahigawa stable and reached west makushita 44 in Part 2.
Daniel Stefanov (ダニエル・ステファノフ, Danieru Sutefanofu)
Voiced by: Justin Tomimori (Japanese); Dave Trosko (English)
Second year student at Eiga High, an exchange student from Bulgaria. At 199 cm (6.5 ft), he is the tallest member on the team. When he first came to Japan he was a weak wrestler, but he began to excel when Sōsuke joined the club; having initially taken up the sport after watching his father Yamatokuni compete. As a professional, he joined Yamatokuni stable and reached west makushita 1 in Part 2.

=== Tottori Hakurou High School ===
Shido Tennoji (天王寺獅童, Tennoji Shido)
Voiced by: Ryōta Takeuchi (Japanese); Daman Mills (English)
Third year student at Tottori Hakurou, captain of its sumo club, and the high school yokozuna for the last two years. Undefeated since entering high school, he is known under the epithet of "Dōjigiri Yasutsuna" (童子切安綱). He is also the winner of last year's All-Japan Championship, which includes high school and university students and business men. Hinomaru looks up to and admires him, even having imitated some of his moves. In elementary school Tennoji was on the smaller side and polished his techniques to overcome this, but in junior high his body grew; thus he possesses both a high level of technical skill and the natural advantages of a large physique. He also thoroughly studies all of his potential opponents. After winning the All-Japan Championship in his last year of high school, he enters professional sumo via makushita tsukedashi. He joined Nagato stable and uses his epithet as his shikona. In Part 2, he reaches west ōzeki. After suffering his second loss of the September tournament to Hinomaru, he withdraws on day 9 due to injury. However, he re-enters on the 12th day. He is the one to call a mono-ii during Kuze and Jin'o's final bout, which results in an overturned decision and the need for a playoff.
Akihira Kano (加納彰平, Kano Akihara)
Voiced by: Toshiki Masuda (Japanese); Kyle Phillips (English)
A former student of Tottori Hakurou and Eiga University and former member of both schools' sumo clubs. He is known under the epithet of Ōkanehira (大包平). His father is the coach of Hakurou's sumo club. He attended college at Eiga University and was a member of its sumo club alongside Yuma. As a professional sumo wrestler he uses his epithet as his shikona and joined Asahigawa stable, where he is the only one brave enough to stand up to the yokozuna when he does something unbecoming of his rank. In high school he was content at being number two behind Tennoji, but he has since rid himself of this inferiority complex. He reaches east maegashira 2, and receives the Fighting Spirit prize in the September tournament.
Shintarou Enoki (榎木晋太郎, Enoki Shintarou)
Voiced by: Atsushi Tamaru (Japanese); Dallas Reid (English)
Student at Tottori Hakurou High who went to the same junior high school in Osaka as Tennoji, where they were both members of the sumo club. When he was about to quit the club due to his lack of skills, Tennoji noticed his strong wrists, unique frontal defense and quick recovery from taking a fall due to Enoki's brief background in aikido. Tennoji suggested Enoki further pursue aikido and utilize it in his sumo, which he did.
Batmünkh Batbayar (バトムンフ・バトバヤル, Batomunfu Batobayaru)
Voiced by: Genki Okawa (Japanese); Shawn Gann (English)
Nicknamed "Bat", he is a first year transfer student from Mongolia. He has trained in Mongolian wrestling since he was 6 years old and won a Naadam before moving to Japan. He joined Shibakiyama stable and is known under the shikona Hakurō Shō (白狼 昇). In Part 2, he is ranked in the makushita division and wins its September tournament.
Saki Tennōji (天王寺 咲, Tennoji Saki)
Voiced by: Anna Yamaki (Japanese); Jill Harris (English)
Manager of the Tottori Hakurou sumo club and younger sister of Shido. She often hangs out at Shibakiyama stable on her days off, and met Hinomaru there during his trial-run. After witnessing his skill, she becomes overly eager to see how he will perform against her brother in the tournament; with the implications that she now has feelings for him. In Part 2, she is studying to become a sumo reporter.

=== Shibakiyama stable ===
Akio Shibakiyama (柴木山 明雄, Shibakiyama Akio)
Voiced by: Hozumi Gōda (Japanese); Jeremy Inman (English)
The stablemaster of Shibakiyama stable, he is a former sekiwake known for the intense training at his stable. When he was active under the shikona Kaoruyama (薫山), he once obtained a kinboshi for defeating Yamatokuni. He is a former student of Shunkai, and was known as an undersized and aggressive wrestler with a straight-on style, just like Hinomaru. He and his stable train with Odachi High, and he offers to let Hinomaru join the stable when he is ready to go pro.
Norihiro Saenoyama (冴ノ山紀洋, Saenoyama Norihiro)
Voiced by: Tarusuke Shingaki (Japanese); J. Michael Tatum (English)
The west maegashira 9, he is the strongest member of Shibakiyama stable. He is known for his flexible limbs and one-punch takedowns. He fights with a 'be like water' mantra, to adapt and then deal decisive blows. Went pro after junior high school. After struggling against the foreign wrestlers for years, he reaches west sekiwake in Part 2. He is the wrestler who gives Jin'o his first loss of the September tournament, and receives the Outstanding Performance prize.
Takuya Terahara (寺原 拓哉, Terahara Takuya)
Voiced by: Tetsuya Kakihara (Japanese); David Matranga (English)
A sumo wrestler of the Shibakiyama stable. He took third in the Kantō region's newcomer tournament three years ago. He goes to watch Odachi High compete in the Chiba preliminaries of the Inter High Tournament alongside Shibakiyama. In Part 2, he has gained a lot of weight and is ranked in sandanme.

=== Other characters ===
Keiko Nazuka (名塚 景子)
A reporter for Gekkan Sumo Dō (月刊相撲道) magazine. She has a lot of knowledge about sumo and a particular interest in Hinomaru's generation of National Treasures. She attends every tournament with her photographer co-worker Toshio Miyazaki (宮崎 敏夫), who can gauge a wrestler's strength just by looking at them through the viewfinder of his camera. In Part 2, she is instead accompanied by fellow journalist Koshinaka.
Shunkai Tokio (駿海 登喜雄, Shunkai Tokio)
Voiced by: Kazuhiko Inoue (Japanese); Mark Stoddard (English)
Real name Tokio Ogawa (尾川 登喜雄), is a retired yokozuna and Shibakiyama's former coach. After retiring he coached two wrestlers up to yokozuna rank, but left the sumo association. At Shibakiyama's request, he trains Hinomaru to strengthen his new finishing move, but has a harsh and unorthodox training regimen that he refuses to explain. After the Inter High tournament, Shunkai was inspired to get back into the sumo world, but because he already left the sumo association he has his former student Nagato (長門) start a stable and invites many of the top high school wrestlers to join. In Part 2, he is dying from ill health and as his last wish asks Hinomaru to defeat Jin'o in the September tournament.
Tenma Hikage (日景典馬, Hikage Tenma)
Voiced by: Yoshimasa Hosoya (Japanese); Gabe Kunda (English)
A second year student at Kanazawakita High School and younger brother of current ōzeki Daikeishō, the highest-ranked Japanese sumo wrestler. Rude and cocky, he looks down on his brother as he believes he has given up on becoming a yokozuna. He is 202 cm (6.6 ft) tall and is known for his powerful palm strikes. He is known under the epithet "Ōdenta Mitsuyo" (大典太 光世) and uses it as his shikona in his professional sumo career. In Part 2, he reaches east komusubi.
Akira Jin'o (刃皇 晃)
A yokozuna from Mongolia with a large scar from his forehead down over his left eye, who is hailed as the greatest sumo wrestler of all time. Although his conduct has occasionally been criticized as unbecoming of a yokozuna, he feels this, and the belief that his accomplishments are not as remarkable due to taking place in an era of weak competition, is discrimination from the Japanese because he is a foreigner. After winning his 44th championship in Part 2, he voices disappointment with the National Treasure generation and tearfully claims he will retire if he wins the next tournament, rather than let the young wrestlers wait to beat him as he declines due to age. Jin'o seems to have multiple personalities, each corresponding to a different emotion, and the series depicts these Jin'os having discussions with each other in his head.
Tsukasa Yamatogo (大和号 司)
One of the Three Great Spears, who are of the same generation as the National Treasures, but went professional after junior high school. He is a part of Yamatokuni stable and is known for having the best headbutting skills.
Rui Tonbokiri (蜻蛉切 瑠偉)
One of the Three Great Spears, who are of the same generation as the National Treasures, but went professional after junior high school. A member of Mishima stable, he is half-Japanese and half-British. He has a reputation for being cruel and only cares about rank, being suspected of intentionally injuring Kaorumaru during the Gifu training camp. However, he immediately shows respect to Ozeki after seeing his talent and claims he is only cruel to talentless people who do not know when to quit.
Tadashi Otegine (御手杵 忠)
One of the Three Great Spears, who are of the same generation as the National Treasures, but went professional after junior high school. He is a very tall wrestler known for his technical skill and flexibility. Instead of going on the Gifu training camp, he trains with fellow sekiwake Saenoyama.

== Production ==
After having had several works published in the Kodansha magazines Morning and Monthly Morning Two, Kawada submitted a work to Shueisha for their Tezuka Award. It won an honorable mention and Hitoshi Koike was assigned as his editor. Koike suggested he continue to write seinen manga for a magazine such as Weekly Young Jump, but Kawada strongly desired to try his hand at shōnen manga. The idea for Hinomaru Sumo came from Kawada's own interest in sumo. Although he had always liked it, he really got hooked on the sport when Asashōryū was in his prime, which was around the time he became a professional manga artist. Kawada said that this was also when sumo's popularity was declining, so he wanted to spread the passion of sumo and therefore wanted to do it in the popular magazine Weekly Shōnen Jump. The story he initially pitched for the manga had two protagonists; one who loves sumo like Hinomaru Ushio, and another that ended up becoming the prototype for Yuma Gojo. But Koike felt the story did not make much sense because it had too much content and too many characters. So he told Kawada, "I simply want a character who shows the greatness of sumo from an outsider's point of view." The one-shot was published in the Spring 2013 issue of Shōnen Jump Next!.

Koike suggested that, despite sumo being well-known, the young readers of Weekly Shōnen Jump at the time probably did not have a good image of the sport; this is expressed in the first chapter of the manga where a character comments that sumo is just "two fat guys hugging naked". But the editor said, "Sumo is a sport with a long history and tradition, so if you can get over the initial prejudice of readers, it is a treasure trove of attractive material for manga." He explained that he and Kawada tried their best to overturn that perception by conveying the feelings of the athletes and fans who devote their lives to the sport. He cited conveying why the good-looking character Mizuki Sada competes in sumo as one of these attempts to gain readers' interest. From the beginning of the series, the artist and editor were aware of the necessity of characters having special moves, but Kawada said he was always conscious of depicting it as fiction while maintaining the realism.

== Media ==
=== Manga ===
Written and illustrated by Kawada, Hinomaru Sumo began serialization in Weekly Shōnen Jump on May 26, 2014. A crossover chapter between the series and Tadatoshi Fujimaki's Kuroko's Basketball, with a script written by Ichirō Takahashi, was published in the magazine on November 9, 2015. Kawada was formerly an assistant to Fujimaki on Kuroko's Basketball. Hinomaru Sumo is split into two parts; "Part 1: Student Sumo Arc" finished with chapter 159 on September 4, 2017, while "Part 2: Professional Sumo Arc" began in the following issue. The 250th and final chapter of the series was published on July 22, 2019, with an epilogue published on October 4, 2019, on the Shōnen Jump+ platform. Shueisha compiled its individual chapters into twenty-eight tankōbon volumes between September 2014 and December 2019. They began to simulpublish the series in English on the website and app Manga Plus in January 2019.

==== Volumes ====
No.	Release date	ISBN
1	September 4, 2014	978-4-08-880254-1
2	November 4, 2014	978-4-08-880255-8
3	February 4, 2015	978-4-08-880305-0
4	April 3, 2015	978-4-08-880334-0
5	July 3, 2015	978-4-08-880428-6
6	September 4, 2015	978-4-08-880464-4
7	November 4, 2015	978-4-08-880501-6
8	February 4, 2016	978-4-08-880606-8
9	April 4, 2016	978-4-08-880653-2
10	July 4, 2016	978-4-08-880688-4
11	September 2, 2016	978-4-08-880778-2
12	November 4, 2016	978-4-08-880808-6
13	February 3, 2017	978-4-08-881003-4
14	April 4, 2017	978-4-08-880688-4
15	June 2, 2017	978-4-08-881176-5
16	September 4, 2017	978-4-08-881203-8
17	November 2, 2017	978-4-08-881222-9
18	January 4, 2018	978-4-08-881319-6
19	March 2, 2018	978-4-08-881360-8
20	May 2, 2018	978-4-08-881410-0
21	August 3, 2018	978-4-08-881536-7
22	October 4, 2018	978-4-08-881587-9
23	December 4, 2018	978-4-08-881664-7
24	February 4, 2019	978-4-08-881721-7
25	May 2, 2019	978-4-08-881830-6
26	July 4, 2019	978-4-08-881879-5
27	October 4, 2019	978-4-08-882078-1
28	December 4, 2019	978-4-08-882140-5

=== Anime ===
The first chapter of Hinomaru Sumo received a four episode "vomic" adaptation for the television show Vomic TV, and aired on Animax between February 4 and 28, 2015. The program adds voice actors, sound effects and background music to the manga pages.

A 24-episode anime television series adaptation by Gonzo aired from October 5, 2018, to March 29, 2019. Crunchyroll simulcast the series, while Funimation produced an English dub. The first opening theme is "Fire Ground" by Official Hige Dandism, and the first ending theme is "Hiizuru Basho" (日出ズル場所) by Omedetai Atama de Nani Yori. The second opening theme is "Be the Naked" by Lead, and the second ending theme is "Sakura Sake" (桜咲け) by Yamada Yoshida.

=== Novels ===
Atarō Kuma wrote a novel adaptation of Hinomaru Sumo titled Hinomaru Sumo Shijūhatte (火ノ丸相撲 四十八手), that was published on February 4, 2016. Two more novels in the series were published on November 2, 2017, and October 4, 2018.

== Reception ==
Volume 1 reached 40th place on the weekly Oricon manga charts and, by September 7, 2014, had sold 19,924 copies; volume 3 reached 20th place and, by February 8, 2015, had sold 27,002 copies.

Former komusubi Mainoumi said that although he does not usually read manga, Hinomaru Sumo drew him in and said he would be happy if it got readers into sumo. Takashi Shimada, one half of the manga artist duo Yudetamago, revealed that parts of his series Kinnikuman were influenced by Hinomaru Sumo.

In November 2014, Weekly Shōnen Jump sponsored a professional sumo match for the first time ever during the November tournament and had their banner feature Hinomaru Ushio. The match, and money, was won by yokozuna Hakuhō. Kawada and Hinomaru Sumo collaborated with the Japan Sumo Association to design special goods and merchandise sold during the May 2016 tournament.

In February 2015, Kadokawa Corporation's entertainment magazine Entermix placed Hinomaru Sumo at 15th on their 2014 Kore Yonde Manga Ranking list, which polled 3,000 bookstore employees. The series was ranked 14th on Honya Club's Zenkoku Shotenin ga Eranda Osusume Comic 2015, which polled 2,360 bookstore employees for their favorite manga with less than five volumes. Hinomaru Sumo came in fifth place in the 2015 Next Manga Awards, which are held by Kadokawa's Da Vinci magazine and Niconico. It was also nominated for Best Shōnen Manga at the 39th Kodansha Manga Awards.

In September 2023, the Japan Sumo Association loosened the height and weight requirements for professional sumo. As a result, Kawada remarked that "Hinomaru Sumo has become something of the past."
