= Speed Star (Lead song) =

Single by Lead

from the album Now or Never
- B-side: "Speechless"; "Virgin Blue 2010"; "Hikari" (Hiroki, Shinya, Keita, Akira ver.)
- Released: July 28, 2010
- Recorded: 2010
- Genre: J-pop, hip hop, dance
- Label: Pony Canyon

Lead singles chronology
"GiraGira Romantic" (2009)	"Speed Star" (2010)	"Hurricane" (2011)

"Speed Star" (stylized as SPEED STAR★) is the 17th domestic single by the Japanese hip-hop group Lead, released on July 28, 2010, a year after their previous single "GiraGira Romantic". The single peaked at number 11 on the Oricon Singles Chart, and remained on the charts for three weeks.

The single was released as a standard CD and four CD+DVD combo packs, with each CD+DVD version corresponding to a member of the group. The member versions contained the bonus track "Hikari", which was performed as a solo by whichever member's edition was purchased. A new rendition of their 2006 song "Virgin Blue" was included on all versions, along with the track "Speechless".

== Information ==
"Speed Star" was released a year after their previous single, "GiraGira Romantic", and was their third annual summer single. It charted in the top twenty on the Oricon Singles Chart at No. 11 and remained on the charts for three consecutive weeks. It became their first single under the Pony Canyon label, whereas their previous singles were under the Pony Canyon sub-label Flight Master.

It was their second single to be released in multiple editions, outside of the standard CD and CD+DVD combo packs. Along with the CD only version, "Speed Star" was released in four separate CD+DVD editions. Each of the combo versions corresponded to a member of the group, and contained the bonus coupling track "Hikari" (光 / Light) that was performed as a solo by the member of the corresponding edition. All versions were accompanied by the tracks "Speechless" and a modern rendition of "Virgin Blue", which the group had originally released in 2006. The DVD on all editions housed the music video and the off-shot making video of "Speed Star."

== Background and composition ==
"Speed Star" was composed by musical composer and songwriter Kisaburō Suzuki, while Yuki Saki performed the arrangement. The lyrics were written by Lantana, while Lead's rapper Shinya Tanuichi wrote the rap portion. Suzuki has also worked with the likes of singer and actress Kyōko Koizumi and Chiemi Hori, among other famous artists. "Speechless" was written and composed by Canadian DJ and record producer Vincent DeGiorgio and Swedish music producers Pontus Söderqvist and Bjorn Djupstrom. Vincent would work with Lead for their songs "Still" and "Wanna Be with You", both of which charted in top five on Oricon at No. 3 and No. 4, respectively. Pontus has also worked on top-charting songs, most notably "The Juvenile" by the Swedish group Ace of Base from their album Da Capo (2002), and Joana Zimmer's song "I Believe" (2005). Once again, Lantana and Shinya wrote the lyrical portion.

"Virgin Blue 2010" was originally composed by Suzuki Kisaburo with the lyrics written by Sagara Yoshiaki. However, for both Lead's 2006 and 2010 versions, the music was performed by Haya from the group Summer Snow Surprise. The CD+DVD bonus track "Hikari" was written and composed by Shonen-JET, while songwriter Ohno Kazunari performed the instrumental. The lyrics were written by Keita Furuya and Shinya of Lead, with Shinya writing the rap portion.

== Promotional advertisements ==
To help promote the single, the title track "Speed Star" was utilized as the ending theme to the Nippon Television series Bear Hut of Oguma (小熊のベア小屋 / Koguma no Bea Koya) throughout the month of August 2010.

== Track listing ==
CD
No.	Title	Lyrics	Music	Arranger(s)	Length
1.	"Speed Star"	Lantana • Shinya Tanuichi (rap)	Yuki Saki	Kisaburō Suzuki	3:21
2.	"Speechless"	Lantana • Shinya Tanuichi	Vincent DeGiorgio • Pontus Söderqvist • Bjorn Djupstrom	Vincent DeGiorgio • Pontus Söderqvist • Bjorn Djupstrom	3:39
3.	"Virgin Blue 2010"	Sagara Yoshiaki	Haya	Kisaburo Suzuki	3:40
4.	"Hikari" (光 / Light)	Keita Furuya • Shinya Tanuichi (rap)	Ohno Kazunari	Shonen-JET	4:14
5.	"Speed Star" (instrumental)		Yuki Saki	Kisaburo Suzuki	3:19
Total length:					18:13

DVD
No.	Title	Length
1.	"Speed Star" (music video)	3:32
2.	"Speed Star" (off-shot video)	31:58
Total length:		35:30

== Charts ==
Release	Chart	Peak position
July 28, 2010	Japan (Oricon Weekly Singles Chart)	11
