= Singularity (Lead album) =

Studio album by Lead
- Released: March 18, 2020
- Recorded: 2019–2020
- Genre: Hip hop, pop, R&B, dance
- Label: Pony Canyon

Lead chronology
Milestone (2018)	Singularity (2020)	Joy Joy Home Mix (2020)

Singles from Singularity
- 1. "Be the Naked" Released: January 30, 2019; 2. "Summer Vacation" Released: July 24, 2019; 3. "Hide and Seek/Sunset Refrain" Released: February 17, 2020

Singularity is the ninth studio album released by the Japanese hip hop group Lead, released on March 18, 2020, nearly two years after their previous album, Milestone. It debuted at No. 12 on the Oricon charts, becoming their first in eight years not to debut in the top ten.

The album included their singles "Be the Naked", "Summer Vacation" and "Hide and Seek/Sunset Refrain".

Singularity was released in three separate editions; a CD only version, a 2CD edition that contained a special booklet, and a CD+DVD edition, which housed music videos for not only the videos from the singles, but the previously unreleased video for "Hide and Seek".

== Information ==
Singularity debuted on the Oricon Albums Chart at No. 12, breaking their string of top ten album releases, which began in 2012 with their studio album Now or Never. By the second day, it had dropped to the No. 20 spot.

The album was released in three separate editions: a standard CD containing thirteen musical tracks; a type A CD+DVD edition, which housed music videos for all the videos from the singles, along with the previously unreleased "Hide and Seek"; and a type B 2CD edition that contained thirteen tracks on the first disc, a special radio show hosted by the group, a remix of "Summer Vacation", a live version of "Say Good-bye Say Hello" and a special booklet. All editions were also given first press limited editions, which included tickets to the group's upcoming live event, Leaders Party 17! ~Breakthrough~.

As a special promotion, when buyers pre-ordered the album at various CD shops nationwide, they could receive a clear file folder. The company also collaborated with Amazon Japan for several promotions, including a DECA jacket with the pattern of either the A or B special edition. At each venue for their fan club tour Leaders Party 17! ~Breakthrough~ (stylized as Leaders Party 17! ~BREAKTHROUGH~), which was held in April 2020, those who purchased a CD, DVD or Blu-ray received a Singularity-themed poster.

== Promotional activities ==
Prior to the album's release, the group had released three singles: "Be the Naked", "Summer Vacation" and "Hide and Seek/Sunset Refrain".

"Be the Naked" was the thirtieth single released by Lead, and was their first single of 2019. It debuted in the top ten on the Oricon Singles Charts at No. 7 and climbed to the No. 6 spot by the third day. It was released in four formats: a standard CD, two CD+DVD editions, and a CD+booklet edition. The CD only version housed the title track and two coupling tracks, while the other editions carried the title track and one of two coupling tracks. "Summer Vacation" was their thirty-fifth single and debuted at No. 6 on the Oricon Singles Charts, becoming their fourteenth consecutive single to chart in the top ten. It came in four formats: a standard CD, two CD+DVD editions, and a CD+booklet edition. The CD only version carried three songs: the title track "Summer Vacation", and the two coupling tracks "Paradise City" and "Anthem". As with their previous single, each edition harbored the main track and one of two b-sides.

"Hide and Seek/Sunset Refrain" was their thirty-second single, and final single before their album Singularity. The single continued their streak of top-charting singles, and peaked at No. 3 on the Oricon Singles Charts. The single was released in four formats: a standard CD, two CD+DVD editions, and a CD+booklet edition. The standard CD housed the title tracks and the coupling track "Midnight Free Way", while the CD+DVD editions only contained the two a-sides. The CD+booklet, however, featured the two title tracks, along with their corresponding instrumentals.

As a special promotion, when buyers pre-ordered the album at various CD shops nationwide, they could receive a clear file folder. The company also collaborated with Amazon Japan where buyers would receive a DECA jacket with the pattern of either the A or B special edition cover. At each venue for their fan club tour Leaders Party 17! ~Breakthrough~, which will be held in April 2020, those who purchase a music CD or DVD/Blu-ray will receive a Singularity-themed poster.

In an effort to aid in promotion, on March 22, a live broadcast was launched on Line Live, where the group talked about the album.

== Track listing ==
Disc 1
No.	Title	Lyrics	Music	Arranger(s)	Length
1.	"Regularity://"		Akira Kagimoto	Akira Kagimoto	1:42
2.	"Singularity" (シンギュラリティ)	Saeki Yuusuke • Shinya Tanuichi (rap)	HiDE Kawada	HIKARI • MoonChild • HIROMI	4:29
3.	"Be the Naked"	Saeki Yuusuke • Shinya Tanuichi (rap)	Coach & Sendo	Obi Mhondera • Kyler Niko • Coach & Sendo	4:05
4.	"Depend on Me"	Yuki Tsujimura	Erik Lidbom • Yuki Tsujimura	Erik Lidbom	3:50
5.	"Summer Vacation"	shungo.	Ryo 'LEFTY' Miyata	Fredrik "Figge" Boström • Ryo 'LEFTY' Miyata • Lars Säfsund	3:51
6.	"Seasons"	Housei Shiramizu • tossy	Housei Shiramizu • tossy	tossy	4:09
7.	"Milk Tea"	7chi子♪ • Shinya Tanuichi (rap)	Albin Nordqvist • Eric Ng	Albin Nordqvist	3:17
8.	"Just Love You (Seishun Hakusho)" (青春白書)	Akira Kagimoto	Akira Kagimoto • Ryota Kikuchi (piano)	Akira Kagimoto	4:42
9.	"Magic Magic Magic"	Yuki Tsujimura	Victor Sagfors • Yuki Tsujimura	Victor Sagfors	4:03
10.	"Sunset Refrain"	shungo.	KID STORM • MUSOH • SLIPKID	KID STORM	3:04
11.	"Anthem"	Akira Kagimoto • Shinya Tanuichi (rap)	Akira Kagimoto	Akira Kagimoto	3:59
12.	"Ride on Music"	Akira Kagimoto • Shinya Tanuichi (rap)	Akira Kagimoto • Nobuyuki Nishikawa (guitar)	Akira Kagimoto	3:24
13.	"Hide and Seek"	Akira Kagimoto • Shinya Tanuichi (rap)	MASAT • Drew Ryan Scott	MASAT	3:00
Total length:					47:35

Disc 2
No.	Title	Length
1.	""Thursday Boys' Association" SP ~Singularity Radio~" (木曜日の男子会)	39:35
2.	"Summer Vacation" (Lingering Summer Heat Remix; remixed by Akira)	4:12
3.	"Say Good-bye Say Hello" (Lead Upturn 2019 ~Sync~ Live ver.)	5:45
Total length:		49:32

DVD
No.	Title	Director(s)	Length
1.	"Be the Naked" (music video)	Takuya Tada	4:07
2.	"Summer Vacation" (music video)	Takuya Tada	2:57
3.	"Sunset Refrain" (music video)	Yoshiharu Seri (SEP)	3:57
4.	"Hide and Seek" (music video)	Takuya Tada	3:07
5.	"Hide and Seek" (behind the music video)	Minoru Kieda
6.	"Singularity" (behind the jacket shooting)	Minoru Kieda
7.	"Lead Quick Workout (You Can Work with Training)" (一緒にできるトレーニング付き)	Minoru Kieda

== Special release events ==
Singularity launch events

1. January 25, 2020: Tower Records Nagoya PARCO
2. January 26, 2020: Tower Records Kobe Store
3. February 1, 2020: Tower Records Sendai PARCO
4. February 2, 2020: Music Plaza Indo
5. February 19, 2020: Tower Records Shibuya (Autograph／Photo Session)
6. February 20, 2020: Tower Records Shinjuku Store (Autograph Session)
7. March 18, 2020: Tokyo (cancelled)
8. March 20, 2020: Osaka (cancelled)
9. March 21, 2020: Aichi (cancelled)
10. March 22, 2020: Tokyo (cancelled)
11. May 3, 2020: Leaders Exclusive Event (Photo Session)

=== Cancellations ===
On February 19, 2020, through Lead's official Twitter account, Pony Canyon put out a notice that several of the scheduled live events had been postponed or cancelled due to the COVID-19 pandemic. All events between March 18 and March 22 were cancelled indefinitely.

== Personnel ==
Credits are adapted from album's liner notes

Musicians

- Keita Furuya – vocals
- Akira Kagimoto – vocals
- Shinya Tanuichi – vocals

Production

- Naotaka Yamaguchi – producer
- Shigeru Kawai – director
- Daisuke Nishizawa – director
- Hajime Kodama – vocal direction
- Yoshihiro Kinoshita – coordination
- Yukihito Sakakibara – music producer
- Takashi Kasuga – supervisor
- T. Taira – executive producer
- Takashi Tsuboi – audio and recording
- Yoko Abe – products coordinator
- Nobuaki Iijima – art direction
- Misa Tsukagoshi – design
- Susumu Miyawaki – photographer
- Yuya Murata – stylist
- Shunsuke Takata – hair and make-up

== Charts ==
Billboard Japan chart performance for Singularity
Release	Chart	Peak position	Chart run	Total sales
March 18, 2020	Billboard Japan	15	1	5,855

Oricon chart performance for Singularity
Release	Chart	Peak position	Chart run	Total sales
March 18, 2020	Oricon Daily Albums Chart	12	2	
March 18, 2020	Oricon Weekly Albums Chart	17	2	5,196

Sales chart performance for singles from Singularity
Date	Title	Peak position	Sales
January 30, 2019	Be the Naked	6	20,628 copies
July 24, 2019	Summer Vacation	6	23,243 copies
February 19, 2020	Hide and Seek/Sunset Refrain	3	17,777 copies
