= Hurricane (Lead song) =

Single by Lead

from the album Now or Never
- B-side: "Can't Stop"; "24Hrs" (Normal Type); "Unbalance na Kiss o Shite" (Type A); "Sun×You" (Type B); "Walk" (Type C); "What Cha Gonna?" (Type D)
- Released: August 10, 2011
- Recorded: 2011
- Genre: J-pop, hip hop
- Label: Pony Canyon

Lead singles chronology
"Speed Star" (2010)	"Hurricane" (2011)	"Wanna Be With You" (2012)

"Hurricane" is the eighteenth single released by the Japanese hip-hop group Lead. It was their first single of 2011, released a year after their previous single "Speed Star". The peaked at #8 on the Oricon chart, where it stayed for three weeks. The single became their first single to chart in the top ten on Oricon since their 2006 single "Virgin Blue".

The single was released in five formats, a standard CD, and four CD only editions that corresponded to each member. The four corresponding versions were also release as limited editions, which contained event tickets. Each member edition contained different B-sides on the CD portion, along with differing cover art.

== Information ==
"Hurricane" was Lead's first single of 2011, release on August 10, a year after their previous single "Speed Star". This would be the final annual single released by the group, whereas they would begin to release multiple singles per year the following year. The single charted well on the Oricon Singles Chart, taking the #8 spot for the week and remaining on the charts for three consecutive weeks. The single became their first single to chart in the top ten on Oricon since their 2006 single "Virgin Blue".

The single was released in five editions, a standard CD and four member editions that corresponded to each member of the group, each harboring different content and cover art. Not only did the cover art differ with each member edition, when all four editions were purchased, the back covers formed a complete image. The member editions would also be released as first-press limited editions that came with special event tickets to the group's nationwide tour Lead Upturn 2011 (Sun×You).

The song "Unbalance na Kiss wo Shite", which was available on the type A edition, was a cover of the song of the same name, originally released by Hiro Takahashi in 1994 for his second album, Welcome to Popsicle Channel.

The standard edition harbored the title track, the coupling tracks "Can't Stop" – which was available on every edition – and "24Hrs", and the songs' corresponding instrumentals. Jacket A, which corresponded with lead vocalist Hiroki, contained the title track, the coupling tracks "Can't Stop" and "Unbalance na Kiss wo Shite" (アンバランスなKISSをして / Unbalanced Kiss), and the corresponding instrumentals to "Hurricane" and "Unbalance na Kiss wo Shite". Jacket B, which corresponded with lead rapper Shinya, contained the title track, the coupling tracks "Can't Stop" and "Sun×You", and corresponding instrumentals to "Hurricane" and "Sun×You". Jacket C, corresponding with Keita, featured the title track, the coupling tracks "Can't Stop" and "walk", and the instrumentals to "Hurricane" and "walk". Jacket D, which corresponded with the youngest member, Akira, held the title track, the two b-sides "Can't Stop" and the live mix of their song "What cha gonna?", which was originally on their studio album Brand New Era (2004), and the instrumentals for the title track and live mix.

== Track listing ==
CD
No.	Title	Lyrics	Music	Arranger(s)	Length
1.	"Hurricane"	Hirofumi Asamoto • Shinya Tanuichi	Seiji Motoyama	Hirofumi Asamoto	4:03
2.	"Can't Stop"	Seiji Motoyama	Seiji Motoyama	Vincent DeGiorgio • Johan "Jones" Wetterberg • Jakob Hazell • Svante Halldin • Per Eklund	3:48
3.	"24Hrs"	Seiji Motoyama	Seiji Motoyama	Vincent DeGiorgio • Johan "Jones" Wetterberg • Laurence "Woo" Allen	3:10
4.	"Hurricane" (instrumental)		Seiji Motoyama	Hirofumi Asamoto	4:03
5.	"Can't Stop" (instrumental)		Seiji Motoyama	Vincent Degiorgio • Johan "Jones" Wetterberg • Jakob Hazell • Svante Halldin • Per Eklund	3:48
6.	"24Hrs" (instrumental)		Seiji Motoyama	Vincent DeGiorgio • Johan "Jones" Wetterberg • Laurence "Woo" Allen	3:10
Total length:					22:02

CD (Jacket A)
No.	Title	Lyrics	Music	Arranger(s)	Length
1.	"Hurricane"	Hirofumi Asamoto • Shinya Tanuichi	Seiji Motoyama	Hirofumi Asamoto	4:03
2.	"Can't Stop"	Seiji Motoyama	Seiji Motoyama	Vincent DeGiorgio • Johan "Jones" Wetterberg • Jakob Hazell • Svante Halldin • Per Eklund	3:48
3.	"Unbalance na Kiss o Shite"	Hiroshi Yamada	Ikuta Magokoro	Hiro Takahashi	3:48
4.	"Hurricane" (instrumental)		Seiji Motoyama	Hirofumi Asamoto	4:03
5.	"Unbalance na Kiss o Shite" (instrumental)		Ikuta Magokoro	Hiro Takahashi	3:45
Total length:					19:27

CD (Jacket B)
No.	Title	Lyrics	Music	Arranger(s)	Length
1.	"Hurricane"	Hirofumi Asamoto • Shinya Tanuichi	Seiji Motoyama	Hirofumi Asamoto	4:03
2.	"Can't Stop"	Seiji Motoyama	Seiji Motoyama	Vincent DeGiorgio • Johan "Jones" Wetterberg • Jakob Hazell • Svante Halldin • Per Eklund	3:48
3.	"Sun×You"	Lead	Akira Kagimoto	Akira Kagimoto	5:18
4.	"Hurricane" (instrumental)		Seiji Motoyama	Hirofumi Asamoto	4:03
5.	"Sun×You" (instrumental)		Akira Kagimoto	Akira Kagimoto	5:15
Total length:					22:27

CD (Jacket C)
No.	Title	Lyrics	Music	Arranger(s)	Length
1.	"Hurricane"	Hirofumi Asamoto • Shinya Tanuichi	Seiji Motoyama	Hirofumi Asamoto	4:03
2.	"Can't Stop"	Seiji Motoyama	Seiji Motoyama	Vincent DeGiorgio • Johan "Jones" Wetterberg • Jakob Hazell • Svante Halldin • Per Eklund	3:48
3.	"Walk"	Akira Kagimoto • Shinya Tanuichi	Seiji Motoyama	Akira Kagimoto	4:11
4.	"Hurricane" (instrumental)		Seiji Motoyama	Hirofumi Asamoto	4:03
5.	"walk" (Instrumental)		Seiji Motoyama	Akira Kagimoto • Shinya Tanuichi	4:07
Total length:					20:12

CD (Jacket D)
No.	Title	Lyrics	Music	Arranger(s)	Length
1.	"Hurricane"	Hirofumi Asamoto • Shinya Tanuichi	Seiji Motoyama	Hirofumi Asamoto	4:03
2.	"Can't Stop"	Seiji Motoyama	Seiji Motoyama	Vincent DeGiorgio • Johan "Jones" Wetterberg • Jakob Hazell • Svante Halldin • Per Eklund	3:48
3.	"What Cha Gonna?" (Live Mix)	Yoko Hiji • Mr.Blistah (rap)	Akira	Yamaki Ryuichiro	3:52
4.	"Hurricane" (instrumental)		Seiji Motoyama	Hirofumi Asamoto	4:03
5.	"What Cha Gonna?" (live mix; instrumental)		AKIRA	Yamaki Ryuichiro	3:50
Total length:					19:36

== Charts ==
Release	Chart	Peak position
August 10, 2011	Oricon Weekly Singles Chart	8
