= GiraGira Romantic =

Single by Lead

from the album Now or Never
- B-side: "High Tension Day"; Stay with Me" (Akira ver.); "Follow Me" (Shinya ver.); "You're the Only One" (Keita ver.); "Kimi (Sakura)" (Hiroki ver.)
- Released: 5 August 2009
- Recorded: 2009
- Genre: J-pop, hip hop, dance
- Label: Flight Master

Lead singles chronology
| "Sunnyday" (2008) | "GiraGira Romantic" (2009) | "Speed Star" (2010) |

"GiraGira Romantic" (ギラギラRomantic) is the sixteenth single released by Japanese hip-hop group Lead, released over a year after their previous single on 5 August 2009 ("Sunnyday" was released at the end of July 2008). The single charted in the top twenty of the Oricon charts, taking the No. 12 spot for the week and remaining on the charts for four weeks.

The single was released in four CD+DVD combo packs, with each version corresponding to a member of the group. Each edition contained a bonus song, which was performed as a solo by whichever member's edition was purchased. The B-side "High Tension Day", however, was performed by all members and available on all versions.

"GiraGira Romantic" also became the official starting point for the group's annual releases. For the next four years, the group would only release one single, which would be released during the summer months. It also became their final single under the Pony Canyon sub-label Flight Master, whereas they would move to the main label.

== Information ==
"GiraGira Romantic" became their first single in over a year, whereas their previous single, "Sunnyday", was released in July 2008. The single performed well on the Oricon Singles Charts, where it ranked at No. 14 for the week and remained on the charts for four consecutive weeks. The release of the single would become the official starting point of the group releasing only one single per year (despite the unofficial starting point being "Sunnyday"), which would be an annual summer single, for the four years. It would also be their final single released under the Pony Canyon sub-label Flight Master, whereas the group would move to the main label.

The single became the first time the group released multiple editions of a single, outside of the standard CD and CD+DVD combo packs. "GiraGira Romantic" did not receive a CD only version, instead having four separate CD+DVD editions. Each version corresponded to a member of the group, and contained a bonus coupling track that was performed as a solo by the member of the corresponding edition. The "Akira Ver." carried the track "Stay with Me", performed by Akira Kagimoto; the "Shinya Ver." contained the track "Follow Me", performed by the group's rapper Shinya Tanuichi; the "Keita Ver." housed the song "You're the Only One", and was performed by Keita Furuya; the "Hiroki Ver." carried the track "Kimi (Sakura)" (君 〜さくら〜 / "You (Sakura)"), and was performed by the group's lead vocalist Hiroki Nakadoi. The track "High Tension Day" (HighテンションDAY) was available on all editions, along with the instrumental to "GiraGira Romantic." The DVD of all versions carried the music video of "GiraGira Romantic", the off-shot making video and an instructional dance video.

"GiraGira Romantic" was composed by Japanese singer-songwriter Hiroaki Serizawa. Hirofumi Hibino and Toru Watanabe performed the song, while the lyrics were written by lyricist and novelist leonn. "High Tension Day" was composed by Seiji Motoyama and the members of Lead, the latter had also written the lyrics, while Seiji performed the piece. "Follow Me" was written and composed by DJ TAKU; however, Lead's main rapper, Shinya, wrote the lyrical portion. The tracks "Stay with me" and "You're the only one" were written and composed by Seiji Motoyama. The youngest member of Lead, Akira, wrote the lyrics to "Stay with me"; the group's second lead vocalist, Keita, along with Shinya, wrote the lyrics to "You're the only one" The song "Kimi ~Sakura~" was written and composed by Lead's main vocalist Hiroki, while Seiji Motoyama performed the instrumental.

"Gira gira" is a Japanese sound effect, which typically denotes something shiny or sparkling.

== Track listing ==
CD (Hiroki ver.)
| No. | Title | Lyrics | Music | Arranger(s) | Length |
|---|---|---|---|---|---|
| 1. | "GiraGira Romantic" (ギラギラRomantic) | leonn | Hirofumi Hibino • Toru Watanabe | Hiroaki Serizawa | 4:02 |
| 2. | "High Tension Day" (HighテンションDAY) | Lead | Seiji Motoyama | Lead • Seiji Motoyama | 4:14 |
| 3. | "Kimi (Sakura)" (君 〜さくら〜) | Hiroki Nakadoi | Seiji Motoyama | Hiroki Nakadoi • Seiji Motoyama | 3:55 |
| 4. | "GiraGira Romantic" (instrumental) | | Hirofumi Hibino • Toru Watanabe | Hiroaki Serizawa | 3:59 |
| Total length: | | | | | 16:10 |

CD (Shinya ver.)
| No. | Title | Lyrics | Music | Arranger(s) | Length |
|---|---|---|---|---|---|
| 1. | "GiraGira Romantic" | leonn | Hirofumi Hibino • Toru Watanabe | Hiroaki Serizawa | 4:02 |
| 2. | "High Tension Day" | Lead | Seiji Motoyama | Lead • Seiji Motoyama | 4:14 |
| 3. | "Follow Me" | Shinya Tanuichi | DJ Taku | DJ Taku | 3:46 |
| 4. | "GiraGira Romantic" (instrumental) | | Hirofumi Hibino • Toru Watanabe | Hiroaki Serizawa | 3:59 |
| Total length: | | | | | 16:01 |

CD (Keita ver.)
| No. | Title | Lyrics | Music | Arranger(s) | Length |
|---|---|---|---|---|---|
| 1. | "GiraGira Romantic" | leonn | Hirofumi Hibino • Toru Watanabe | Hiroaki Serizawa | 4:02 |
| 2. | "High Tension Day" | Lead | Seiji Motoyama | Lead • Seiji Motoyama | 4:14 |
| 3. | "You're the Only One" | Keita Furuya • Shinya Tanuichi | Seiji Motoyama | Seiji Motoyama | 3:51 |
| 4. | "GiraGira Romantic" (instrumental) | | Hirofumi Hibino • Toru Watanabe | Hiroaki Serizawa | 3:59 |
| Total length: | | | | | 16:06 |

CD (Akira ver.)
| No. | Title | Lyrics | Music | Arranger(s) | Length |
|---|---|---|---|---|---|
| 1. | "GiraGira Romantic" | leonn | Hirofumi Hibino • Toru Watanabe | Hiroaki Serizawa | 4:02 |
| 2. | "High Tension Day" | Lead | Seiji Motoyama | Lead • Seiji Motoyama | 4:14 |
| 3. | "Stay with Me" | Akira Kagimoto | Seiji Motoyama | Seiji Motoyama | 4:02 |
| 4. | "GiraGira Romantic" (instrumental) | | Hirofumi Hibino • Toru Watanabe | Hiroaki Serizawa | 3:59 |
| Total length: | | | | | 16:17 |

DVD
| No. | Title | Length |
|---|---|---|
| 1. | "GiraGira Romantic" (music video) | 4:00 |
| 2. | "GiraGira Romantic" (off-shot video) |
| 3. | "GiraGira Romantic" (Dance Course) (ダンス講座) | 7:23 |

== Charts ==
| Release | Chart | Peak position |
|---|---|---|
| 5 August 2009 | Oricon Weekly Singles Chart | 12 |
