= Green Days / Strings =

"Green Days" / "Strings"

Single by Lead

from the album The Showcase
- B-side: "Strings" (Normal; Type A, B & C); "Ame Nochi-kun" (Jacket A); "Giant Steps" (Jacket B); "Azayakana Sekai" (Jacket C)
- Released: September 18, 2013
- Recorded: 2013
- Genre: J-pop, hip hop
- Label: Pony Canyon

Lead singles chronology
"Upturn" (2013)	"Green Days" / "Strings" (2013)	"Sakura" (2014)

"Green Days" / "Strings" is the twenty-second single by Japanese hip hop group Lead, released on September 18, 2013. The single continued their top-charting releases, reaching No. 4 for the week and remaining on the chart for four weeks.

The single was released in four formats: a standard CD, two limited CD+DVD combo packs and a limited CD edition, each containing different content. Each edition contained different cover art. While every edition contained the track "Strings", the limited editions harbored varying B-sides. The CD+DVD versions not only contained differing tracks on the CD, but also carried differing content on the DVD portion.

== Information ==
"Green Days" / "Strings" is the second single the group released as a trio after lead vocalist and group leader Hiroki Nakadoi graduated from the group. The single continued the group's string of top-charting releases, peaking at No. 4 on the Oricon Singles Chart and remaining on the chart for four consecutive weeks.

The single was released in four editions, a standard CD, two limited CD+DVD combo packs and a limited CD edition. Each edition contained different content, sans the coupling track "strings", which was available on every editions. The standard edition carried the two tracks, along with their corresponding instrumentals and an edited version of "Green Days", which was a shortened version of the original track. The CD on the type A edition contained the bonus track "Ame Nochi-kun" (雨のち君 / "Rainy Moon"), and the songs' corresponding instrumentals. The DVD contained the music video and the making video of the song "Green Days." The type B CD carried the bonus track "Giant Steps", while the DVD portion contained a "solo focus" version of the title track (in which each member had their own version), and the recordings of each member. The bonus track on the type C edition was "Azayakana Sekai" (アザヤカナセカイ / "Brilliant World").

== Track listing ==
CD
No.	Title	Lyrics	Music	Arranger(s)	Length
1.	"Green Days"	AnDiSM	MEG.ME	AnDiSM
2.	"Strings"	Shinya Tanuichi	Yukiyoshi
3.	"Green Days" (TV Drama Edit)	AnDiSM	MEG.ME	AnDiSM
4.	"Green Days" (instrumental)		MEG.ME	AnDiSM
5.	"Strings" (instrumental)		Yukiyoshi

CD (Type A)
No.	Title	Lyrics	Music	Arranger(s)	Length
1.	"Green Days"	AnDiSM	MEG.ME	AnDiSM
2.	"Strings"	Shinya Tanuichi	YUKIYOSHI
3.	"Ame-Nochi-kun" (雨のち君 / Rainy Moon)	shogo.k	shogo.k
4.	"Green Days" (instrumental)		MEG.ME	AnDiSM
5.	"Strings" (instrumental)		YUKIYOSHI
6.	"Ame Nochi-kun" (instrumental)		shogo.k

CD (Type B)
No.	Title	Lyrics	Music	Arranger(s)	Length
1.	"Green Days"	AnDiSM	MEG.ME	AnDiSM
2.	"Strings"	Shinya Tanuichi	Yukiyoshi
3.	"Giant Steps"
4.	"Green Days" (instrumental)		MEG.ME	AnDiSM
5.	"Strings" (instrumental)		Yukiyoshi
6.	"Giant Steps" (instrumental)

CD (Type C)
No.	Title	Lyrics	Music	Arranger(s)	Length
1.	"Green Days"	AnDiSM	MEG.ME	AnDiSM
2.	"Strings"	Shinya Tanuichi	Yukiyoshi
3.	"Azayakana Sekai" (アザヤカナセカイ / Brilliant World)
4.	"Green Days" (instrumental)		MEG.ME	AnDiSM
5.	"Strings" (instrumental)		Yukiyoshi
6.	"Azayakana Sekai" (instrumental)

DVD (Type A)
No.	Title	Length
1.	"Green Days" (music video)
2.	"Green Days" (off-shot MV)

DVD (Type B)
No.	Title	Length
1.	"Green Days" (music video; Solo Focused ver.)
2.	"Recording Document" (レコーディングドキュメント)

== Charts ==
Release	Chart	Peak position
September 18, 2013	Oricon Weekly Singles Chart	4
