= Wanna Be with You (Lead song) =

Single by Lead

from the album Now or Never
- B-side: "Hungry Sniper" (Normal Type); "Color" (Type A, B, C & D); "Tick Tock" (Type B); "Last Situation" (Type C); "Gimme Your Love" (Type D)
- Released: March 14, 2012
- Recorded: 2012
- Genre: J-pop, hip hop
- Label: Pony Canyon

Lead singles chronology
"Hurricane" (2011)	"Wanna Be with You" (2012)	"Still" (2012)

"Wanna Be with You" is the nineteenth single released by the Japanese hip-hop group Lead, and their first single of the year, released on March 14, 2012. It was their final single before their studio album Now or Never. The single charted well on Oricon, taking the number three spot for the week and remaining on the charts for three weeks.

The single was released in five formats, a standard CD, a limited edition CD+DVD and three limited CD only editions. Each limited edition contained different B-sides on the CD portion, along with differing cover art.

== Information ==
"Wanna Be with You" was their first single of 2012 and the final single before the release of their studio album Now or Never, which would be released four months later in July. The single charted well on the Oricon Singles Charts, taking the #3 spot for the week and remaining on the charts for three consecutive weeks. The single became their second consecutive single to chart in the top ten on Oricon, and their first single ever to chart in the top five.

The single was released in five editions, a standard CD and four limited editions that corresponded to each member, each harboring different content and cover art. The standard edition harbored the title track, the coupling track "Hungry Sniper" and both songs' corresponding instrumentals. Jacket A, which corresponded with lead vocalist Hiroki, contained the title track, the coupling track "Color" – which was available on every limited edition – and the corresponding instrumentals on the CD portion. It also featured a mini radio interview with Hiroki. Jacket A was also the only version that was released as a CD+DVD combo pack. The DVD housed the music video for "Wanna Be With You" and the off-shot making video.

Jacket B, which corresponded with lead rapper Shinya, contained the title track, the coupling tracks "Color" and "Tick Tock", and the songs' corresponding instrumentals. It also featured the mini radio interview, this time featuring Shinya. Jacket C, corresponding with Keita, featured the title track, the coupling tracks "Color" and "Last Situation", and the corresponding instrumentals. As with the other editions, a bonus track was featured, which was the radio interview with Keita. Jacket D, which corresponding with the youngest member, Akira, held the title track, the two B-sides "Color" and "Gimme Your Love", and the instrumentals for the tracks. The bonus track was the radio interview with Akira.

== Track listing ==
CD
No.	Title	Lyrics	Music	Length
1.	"Wanna Be with You"	Lead • Seiji Motoyama	Vincent Degiorgio • David Fremberg
2.	"Hungry Sniper"	Kenji Hayashida	Kenji Hayashida
3.	"Wanna Be with You" (instrumental)		Vincent Degiorgio • David Fremberg
4.	"Hungry Sniper" (instrumental)		Kenji Hayashida

CD (Jacket A)
No.	Title	Lyrics	Music	Length
1.	"Wanna Be with You"	Lead • Seiji Motoyama	Vincent Degiorgio • David Fremberg
2.	"Color"	Minori	Seiji Motoyama
3.	"Wanna Be with You" (instrumental)		Vincent Degiorgio • David Fremberg
4.	"Color" (instrumental)		Seiji Motoyama
5.	"Special Track Music Radio" (as to Hiroki Nakadoi)

DVD
No.	Title	Length
1.	"Wanna Be with You" (music video)
2.	"Wanna Be with You" (making video off-shot)

CD (Jacket B)
No.	Title	Lyrics	Music	Length
1.	"Wanna Be with You"	Lead • Seiji Motoyama	Vincent Degiorgio • David Fremberg
2.	"Color"	Minori	Seiji Motoyama
3.	"Tick Tock"	Akira Kagimoto	Akira Kagimoto • Hiroki Nakadoi
4.	"Wanna Be with You" (instrumental)		Vincent Degiorgio • David Fremberg
5.	"Color" (instrumental)		Seiji Motoyama
6.	"Tick Tock" (instrumental)		Akira Kagimoto • Hiroki Nakadoi
7.	"Special Track Music Radio" (as to Shinya Tanuichi)

CD (Jacket C)
No.	Title	Lyrics	Music	Length
1.	"Wanna Be with You"	Lead • Seiji Motoyama	Vincent Degiorgio • David Fremberg
2.	"Color"	Minori	Seiji Motoyama
3.	"Last Situation"	MIKOTO	MIKOTO
4.	"Wanna Be with You" (instrumental)		Vincent Degiorgio • David Fremberg
5.	"Color" (instrumental)		Seiji Motoyama
6.	"Last Situation" (instrumental)		MIKOTO
7.	"Special Track Music Radio" (as to Keita Furuya)

CD (Jacket D)
No.	Title	Lyrics	Music	Length
1.	"Wanna Be with You"	Lead • Seiji Motoyama	Vincent Degiorgio • David Fremberg
2.	"Color"	Minori	Seiji Motoyama
3.	"Gimme Your Love"	7chi子♪	7chi子♪
4.	"Wanna Be with You" (instrumental)		Vincent Degiorgio • David Fremberg
5.	"Color" (instrumental)		Seiji Motoyama
6.	"Gimme Your Love" (instrumental)		7chi子♪
7.	"Special Track Music Radio" (as to Akira Kagimoto)

== Charts ==
Release	Chart	Peak position
March 14, 2012	Oricon Weekly Singles Chart	3
