= Yakusoku (Lead song) =

2015 single by Lead

Single by Lead

from the album The Showcase
- B-side: "Always Love"; "Wake Me Up" (Type A); "Moonlight Shower" (Type B); "Cross Over" (Type C)
- Released: November 25, 2015
- Recorded: 2015
- Genre: J-pop; hip hop
- Label: Pony Canyon

Lead singles chronology
"My One" (2015)	"Yakusoku" (2015)	"Tokyo Fever" (2017)

"Yakusoku" (約束 / "Promise") is the twenty-sixth single by the Japanese hip-hop group Lead, and was the final single before the release of their studio album The Showcase (2016). It performed well on Oricon, peaking at number 5 and remaining on the charts for two weeks.

The single was released as a standard CD and three limited edition versions, two of which were CD+DVD combos, each carrying different content. While all editions contained the b-side "Always Love", each of the limited editions harbored differing bonus tracks. The CD+DVD editions not only contained different content on the CD portions, but also carried different content on the DVD portions.

== Information ==
"Yakusoku" was Lead's final single from their seventh studio album, The Showcase, which was released the following year on June 8. It charted well on the Oricon Singles Chartat number five, and remained on the charts for two weeks.

The single was released in four editions, a standard CD, a limited edition CD and two limited edition CD+DVD combo packs. The regular edition contained the title track, the coupling track "Always Love" – which was available on all versions – and their corresponding instrumentals. The limited type A CD+DVD version harbored the two tracks, the bonus track "Wake me up" and the accompanying instrumentals. The DVD portion housed the music video for "Yakusoku" and the off-shot making video. The limited type B CD+DVD editions contained the two regular tracks and the bonus track "Moonlight Shower" (ムーンライトシャワー / "Mūnraito Shawā", along with their instrumentals. The DVD portion contained the dance version of "Yakusoku" and the behind-the-scenes footage of the photo shoot for the different single covers. The limited Type C version contained the two standard tracks, the bonus track "Cross Over" (stylized as CROSS OVER) and the songs' corresponding instrumentals.

== Track listing ==
CD track listing
No.	Title	Lyrics	Music	Length
1.	"Yakusoku" (約束 / "Promise")	AnDiSM; Shinya Tanuichi (rap)	Nishi-ken; AnDiSM
2.	"Always Love"	Lead	Shibu
3.	"Yakusoku" (instrumental)		Nishi-ken; AnDiSM
4.	"Always Love" (instrumental)		Shibu

CD (Type A) track listing
No.	Title	Lyrics	Music	Length
1.	"Yakusoku"	AnDiSM; Shinya Tanuichi (rap)	Nishi-ken; AnDiSM
2.	"Always Love"	Lead	Shibu
3.	"Wake Me Up"	Akira Kagimoto; Shinya Tanuichi (rap)	Akira Kagimoto
4.	"Yakusoku" (instrumental)		Nishi-ken; AnDiSM
5.	"Always Love" (instrumental)		Shibu
6.	"Wake Me Up" (instrumental)		Akira Kagimoto

DVD (Type A)
No.	Title	Length
1.	"Yakusoku" (music video)
2.	"Yakusoku" (making video off-shot)

CD (Type B) track listing
No.	Title	Lyrics	Music	Length
1.	"Yakusoku"	AnDiSM; Shinya Tanuichi (rap)	Nishi-ken; AnDiSM
2.	"Always Love"	Lead	SHIBU
3.	"Moonlight Shower" (ムーンライトシャワー)	Keita Furuya	220Volt (Mirror Boy • D.ham • Moon Hanmiru)
4.	"Yakusoku" (instrumental)		Nishi-ken; AnDiSM
5.	"Always Love" (instrumental)		Shibu
6.	"Moonlight Shower" (instrumental)		220Volt (Mirror Boy • D.ham • Moon Hanmiru)

DVD (Type B) track listing
No.	Title	Length
1.	"Yakusoku" (dance version; music video)
2.	"Yakusoku" (jacket making video)

CD (Type C) track listing
No.	Title	Lyrics	Music	Length
1.	"Yakusoku"	AnDiSM; Shinya Tanuichi (rap)	Nishi-ken; AnDiSM
2.	"Always Love"	Lead	Shibu
3.	"Cross Over"	Shinya Tanuichi	220Volt (Mirror Boy • D.ham • Moon Hanmiru)
4.	"Yakusoku" (instrumental)		Nishi-ken; AnDiSM
5.	"Always Love" (instrumental)		Shibu
6.	"Cross Over" (instrumental)		220Volt (Mirror Boy • D.ham • Moon Hanmiru)

== Charts ==
Release	Chart	Peak position
November 25, 2015	Oricon Weekly Singles Chart	5
