= Summer Vacation (song) =

Single by Lead

from the album Singularity
- B-side: "Paradise City"; "Anthem"
- Released: July 24, 2019
- Recorded: 2019
- Genre: Pop; hip hop
- Label: Pony Canyon

Lead singles chronology
"Be the Naked" (2019)	"Summer Vacation" (2019)	"Hide and Seek/Sunset Refrain" (2020)

"Summer Vacation" is the thirty-first single by Japanese hip-hop group Lead. The single was announced on June 14, 2019, and was released on July 24, 2019. It debuted at No. 6 on the Oricon charts.

The single was their second of 2019, with their first being "Be the Naked", which was released in January.

The single was released in four formats: a standard CD, two CD+DVD editions, and a CD+booklet edition. Each edition also received a limited-edition version that contained concert tickets to their upcoming live.

== Information ==
"Summer Vacation" became Lead's second single of 2019, with their first being "Be the Naked", which was released six months prior in January. It debuted at No. 6 on the Oricon Singles Charts, becoming their fourteenth consecutive single to chart in the top ten. They sold 18,570 units within the first week, giving the single a weekly ranking of No. 8. It continued to rank throughout the month, giving it a monthly ranking of No. 27.

The single came in four formats: a standard CD, two CD+DVD editions, and a CD+booklet edition. The first press editions included tickets to their upcoming live performance. The CD only version carried three songs: the title track "Summer Vacation", and the two coupling tracks "Paradise City" and "Anthem". The CD+DVD editions held the title track and the coupling track "Paradise City". The type A edition carried the music video of "Summer Vacation", along with the behind-the-scenes making video of both the music video and the cover art. The type B DVD housed a "Lead Special Talk". The CD+booklet edition has "Summer Vacation" and the track "Anthem", along with a photo book.

The music video has been described as having "choreography to evoke summer vacation".

== Promotional advertisements ==
To help promote the single, those who preordered the single from various Tower Records stores throughout Japan were able to obtain a special clear folder when they purchased all four editions. This was based on a first-come first-served basis. For stores outside of Tower Records, a special postcard set was available, which included solo postcards featuring each member. The stores who participated were HMV, Amazon Japan, Tsutaya Records and various CD shops.

To celebrate the launch of the single, several events have been held. All lives were free to attend, while members of the group's fan club "Leaders" were able to attend an after party event.

== Track listing ==
(Source)

CD
No.	Title	Lyrics	Music	Composer(s)	Length
1.	"Summer Vacation"	shungo.	Ryo 'Lefty' Miyata	Fredrik "Figge" Boström • Ryo 'Lefty' Miyata • Lars Säfsund	3:52
2.	"Paradise City"	Akira Kagimoto	Hide Kawada	MoonChild • Hikari	3:58
3.	"Anthem"	Akira Kagimoto • Shinya Tanuichi (rap)	Akira Kagimoto	Akira Kagimoto	3:05

Type A
No.	Title	Lyrics	Music	Arranger(s)	Length
1.	"Summer Vacation"	shungo.	Ryo 'Lefty' Miyata	Fredrik "Figge" Boström • Ryo 'Lefty' Miyata • Lars Säfsund	3:52
2.	"Paradise City"	Akira Kagimoto	Hide Kawada	MoonChild • Hikari	3:58

Type A: DVD
No.	Title	Length
1.	"Summer Vacation" (music video)
2.	"Summer Vacation" (behind the music video)
3.	"Summer Vacation" (behind the jacket shooting)

Type B
No.	Title	Lyrics	Music	Arranger(s)	Length
1.	"Summer Vacation"	shungo.	Ryo 'Lefty' Miyata	Fredrik "Figge" Boström • Ryo 'Lefty' Miyata • Lars Säfsund	3:52
2.	"Paradise City"	Akira Kagimoto	HiDE Kawada	MoonChild • Hikari	3:58

Type B: DVD
No.	Title	Length
1.	"Lead Special Live"

Type C
No.	Title	Lyrics	Music	Arranger(s)	Length
1.	"Summer Vacation"	shungo.	Ryo 'Lefty' Miyata	Fredrik "Figge" Boström • Ryo 'Lefty' Miyata • Lars Säfsund	3:52
2.	"Anthem"	Akira Kagimoto • Shinya Tanuichi (rap)	Akira Kagimoto	Akira Kagimoto	3:05

== Charts ==
Release	Chart	Peak position	Total sales
July 24, 2019	Oricon Daily Chart	6	18,570
July 24, 2019	Oricon Weekly Chart	8	22,475
July 24, 2019	Oricon Monthly Chart	27	23,243
