= Be the Naked =

Single by Japanese hip-hop group Lead

Single by Lead

from the album Singularity
- Released: January 30, 2019
- Recorded: 2019
- Genre: Pop; hip hop
- Label: Pony Canyon
- Composers: Coach & Sendo
- Lyricists: Saeki Yuusuke; Shinya Tanuichi

Lead singles chronology
"Bumblebee" (2018)	"Be the Naked" (2019)	"Summer Vacation" (2019)

"Be the Naked" is the thirtieth single by the Japanese hip-hop group Lead, released on January 30, 2019. The single was announced in December 2018, two weeks before the release of their concert DVD Lead Upturn 2018: Milestone. It debuted in the top ten on the Oricon charts at No. 7.

The single is their first release following their album Milestone, and released eight months after their previous single "Bumblebee".

The single was released in four formats: a standard CD, two CD+DVD editions, and a CD+booklet edition. Each edition also received a limited-edition version that held concert tickets to their upcoming live.

== Information ==
"Be the Naked" was Lead's first single of 2019, and the first single following their 2018 studio album Milestone. "Be the Naked" debuted in the top ten on the Oricon Singles Charts at No. 7 and climbed to the No. 6 spot by the third day. However, before the end of the first week, the single fell out of the top 20 to No. 22, giving it a weekly ranking of No. 9 and ending the first week with 18,243 units sold.

The single was released in four formats: a standard CD, two CD+DVD editions, and a CD+booklet edition. The first press editions included tickets to their upcoming live performance. The CD only version held three songs: the title track "Be the Naked", and the two coupling tracks "Drop in the box" and "99.9%". The CD+DVD editions contained the title track and the coupling track "99.9%". The type A edition carried the music video of "Be the Naked", along with the behind-the-scenes making video of both the music video and the cover art. The type B DVD housed the group's "Lead Challenge 30", which was a game show featuring the members. The CD+booklet edition held "Be the Naked" and the track "Drop in the box", along with a 24-page photo book.

"Be the Naked" was arranged by songwriters Obi Mhondera, Kyler Niko and Coach & Sendo, the later of which performed the music. The lyrics were written by Saeki Yuusuke (also known by his stage name 佐伯youthK or Saeki youthK), while Lead's own Shinya Tanuichi wrote the rap portion of the song. "99.9%" was written and composed by Carlos Okabe. Both Okabe and Hali Awani performed the piece. The lyrical portion was written by lyricist Kelly. The track "Drop in the box" was written, composed and performed by RYUJA and rapper KM-MARKIT, the latter of whom had worked with Lead in the past for their 2017 song "Shampoo Bubble". The lyrics were written by Lead members Shinya Tanuichi and Akira Kagimoto.

== Cover art ==
For the type A and standard editions, Shinya, Keita and Akira posed with live flames. The fire and dark tones of the various covers were to portray the intensity and darkness of the title track.

== Promotional advertisements ==
To help promote the single, the song "Be the Naked" was used as the theme song to the second opening of the anime television show Hinomaru Sumo, which began January 25, five days before the single's physical release.

The series currently airs on Fridays at ten o'clock PM on Tokyo MX, AbemaTV, BS11, Sun Television, Aichi TV and TVQ Kyushu.

Aiding in promotions, those who preordered the single from various Tower Records stores throughout Japan were able to obtain a special poster, based on a first-come first-served basis. For stores outside of Tower Records, a special postcard set was available, which included solo postcards featuring each member. The stores participated were HMV, Amazon Japan, Tsutaya Records and various CD shops.

== Music video ==
The music video to "Be the Naked" opens with Keita dragging a broken chair through what appears to be an abandoned building before cutting to all three members utilizing their skills in break dancing, using the interior of the building as the location. The video cuts to various shots of the individual members both in rooms and on the roof of the building, overlooking a city during sunset. During the chorus, when the group sings "be the naked", they motion over their genitals. Shots performed in what appears to be an abandoned theater are overlaid with a mirror effect of two members dancing in the background, while one member sings their lines in the front.

For the video, Keita dons short, blonde hair, a style none of the members have utilized throughout their careers.

On December 30, 2018, Pony Canyon's official YouTube channel for the group uploaded a music video to assist in promotion.

== Track listing ==
CD
No.	Title	Lyrics	Music	Arranger(s)	Length
1.	"Be the Naked"	Saeki Yuusuke • Shinya Tanuichi (rap)	Coach & Sendo	Obi Mhondera • Kyler Niko • Coach & Sendo	4:05
2.	"99.9%"	Kelly	Carlos Okabe	Hani Alwani • Carlos Okabe	3:34
3.	"Drop in the Box"	Shinya Tanuichi • Akira Kagimoto	KM-Markit • Ryuja	KM-Markit • Ryuja	3:31
Total length:					11:10

Type A
No.	Title	Lyrics	Music	Arranger(s)	Length
1.	"Be the Naked"	Saeki Yuusuke • Shinya Tanuichi (rap)	Coach & Sendo	Obi Mhondera • Kyler Niko • Coach & Sendo	4:05
2.	"99.9%"	Kelly	Carlos Okabe	Hani Alwani • Carlos Okabe	3:34
Total length:					7:39

Type A: DVD
No.	Title	Length
1.	"Be the Naked" (music video)	4:07
2.	"Be the Naked" (behind the music video)
3.	"Be the Naked" (behind the jacket shooting)

Type B
No.	Title	Lyrics	Music	Arranger(s)	Length
1.	"Be the Naked"	Saeki Yuusuke • Shinya Tanuichi (rap)	Coach & Sendo	Obi Mhondera • Kyler Niko • Coach & Sendo	4:05
2.	"99.9%"	Kelly	Carlos Okabe	Hani Alwani • Carlos Okabe	3:34
Total length:					7:39

Type B: DVD
No.	Title	Length
1.	"Lead Challenge 30"

Type C
No.	Title	Lyrics	Music	Arranger(s)	Length
1.	"Be the Naked"	Saeki Yuusuke • Shinya Tanuichi (rap)	Coach & Sendo	Obi Mhondera • Kyler Niko • Coach & Sendo	4:05
2.	"Drop in the Box"	Shinya Tanuichi • Akira Kagimoto	KM-Markit • Ryuja	KM-Markit • Ryuja	3:31
Total length:					7:36

== Charts ==
Release	Chart	Peak position	Total sales
January 30, 2019	Oricon Daily Charts	6	
January 30, 2019	Oricon Weekly Chart	9	20,628
