= Hide and Seek / Sunset Refrain =

"Hide and Seek" / "Sunset Refrain"

Single by Lead

from the album Singularity
- Released: February 19, 2020
- Recorded: 2020
- Genre: Pop; hip hop
- Label: Pony Canyon

Lead singles chronology
"Summer Vacation" (2019)	"Hide and Seek" / "Sunset Refrain" (2020)	"Tuxedo" (2020)

"Hide and Seek" / "Sunset Refrain" (H I D E and S E E K／サンセット・リフレイン) is the thirty-second single by the Japanese hip-hop group Lead. It was released on February 19, 2020. It charted in the top five on the Oricon charts at No. 3 and remained on the charts for two consecutive weeks.

The single was released in four formats: a standard CD, two CD+DVD editions, and a CD+booklet edition.

"Sunset Refrain" was utilized as the opening theme to the Fuji TV drama Aloha Sommelier.

== Information ==
"Hide and Seek" / "Sunset Refrain" was Lead's first single of 2020, and final single before their ninth studio album, Singularity. The single continued their streak of top-charting singles, and peaked at No. 3 on the Oricon Singles Chart. It took No. 14 for the month, with total sales of 17,777. It remained on the charts for two weeks.

The single was released in four formats: a standard CD, two CD+DVD editions, and a CD+booklet edition. The standard CD housed the title tracks and the coupling track "Midnight Free Way", while the CD+DVD editions only contained the two a-sides. The CD+booklet, however, featured the two title tracks, along with their corresponding instrumentals.

Despite being released as a double A-side, only "Sunset Refrain" received a music video on the DVD. The video for "Hide and Seek" would be released on their corresponding album, Singularity.

"Hide and Seek" was written and composed by composer Masat, while the piece was performed by Masat and Drew Ryan Scott. Drew Ryan Scott had previously worked with Lead for their songs "Bumblebee" and "Beautiful Day". Lead's own Akira Kagimoto and Shinya Tanuichi wrote the lyrical portion, with Shinya taking over the rap lyrics. "Sunset Refrain" (サンセット・リフレイン) was composed by KID STORM, and arrange by KID STORM, Yutaka Uchida (best known by the stage name "MUSOH") and SLIPKID. The lyrics were written by shungo., who had previously worked with Lead for several songs, including "Summer Vacation" and "Kokorozashi 〜KO.KO.RO.ZA.SHI.〜". "Midnight Free Way" was written and composed by Lead's own Akira Kagimoto, who also wrote the lyrics.

== Promotional activities ==
The song "Sunset Refrain" was utilized as the opening theme to the Fuji TV drama Aloha Sommelier (アロハ・ソムリエ). The drama features actress Arisa Mizuki and is said to have the feeling of a drama set in Hawaii.

== Track listing ==
(Source)

CD
No.	Title	Lyrics	Music	Composer(s)	Length
1.	"Hide and Seek"	Akira Kagimoto • Shinya Tanuichi (rap)	MASAT • Drew Ryan Scott	MASAT	3:00
2.	"Sunset Refrain" (サンセット・リフレイン)	shungo.	Kid Storm • Musoh • Slipkid	Kid Storm	3:04
3.	"Midnight Free Way"	Akira Kagimoto	Akira Kagimoto	Akira Kagimoto	4:01
Total length:					10:05

Type A
No.	Title	Lyrics	Music	Arranger(s)	Length
1.	"Hide and Seek"	Akira Kagimoto • Shinya Tanuichi (rap)	MASAT • Drew Ryan Scott	MASAT	3:00
2.	"Sunset Refrain"	Shungo.	Kid Storm • Musoh • Slipkid	Kid Stom	3:04
Total length:					6:04

Type A: DVD
No.	Title	Length
1.	"Sunset Refrain" (music video)
2.	"Sunset Refrain" (behind the music video)
3.	"Hide and Seek" (behind the jacket shooting)

Type B
No.	Title	Lyrics	Music	Arranger(s)	Length
1.	"Hide and Seek"	Akira Kagimoto • Shinya Tanuichi (rap)	Masat • Drew Ryan Scott	Masat	3:00
2.	"Sunset Refrain"	shungo.	Kid Storm • Musoh • Slipkid	Kid Storm	3:04
Total length:					6:04

Type B: DVD
No.	Title	Length
1.	"Lead Cooking"	52:06

Type C
No.	Title	Lyrics	Music	Arranger(s)	Length
1.	"Hide and Seek"	Akira Kagimoto • Shinya Tanuichi (rap)	Masat • Drew Ryan Scott	Masat	3:00
2.	"Sunset Refrain"	Shungo.	Kid Storm • Musoh • Slipkid	Kid Storm	3:04
3.	"Hide and Seek" (instrumental)		Masat • Drew Ryan Scott	Masat	3:00
4.	"Sunset Refrain" (instrumental)		Kid Storm • Musoh • Slipkid	Kid Storm	3:04
Total length:					12:08

== Charts (Japan) ==
Release	Chart	Peak position	Total sales
February 19, 2020	Oricon Daily Chart	3	
February 19, 2020	Oricon Weekly Chart	3	17,480
February 19, 2020	Oricon Monthly Chart	14	17,777
