= Sakura (Lead song) =

Single by Lead

from the album The Showcase
- B-side: "With U"; "Akaneiro Aomaru Koro Ni" (Jacket A); "Just Do It" (Jacket B); "Can't Stop Loving You" (Jacket C)
- Released: February 26, 2014
- Recorded: 2014
- Genre: J-pop; hip hop
- Label: Pony Canyon
- Songwriters: AnDisM; Yukiyoshi
- Producer: AnDisM

Lead singles chronology
"Green Days/Strings" (2013)	"Sakura" (2014)	"Omoide Breaker" (2014)

"Sakura" (サクラ) is the twenty-third single by the Japanese hip-hop group Lead, released five months after their previous single "Green Days/Strings", on February 26, 2014. The single performed well on the Oricon chart, taking the number 3 slot for the weekly ranking, remaining on the charts for two weeks.

The single was released as a standard CD edition, along with three limited edition, two of which were CD+DVD combos, each carrying different content. While every edition contained the B-side "With U", each edition harbored a bonus track. The CD+DVD editions not only contained differing content on the CD portions, but also harbored different content on the DVDs.

== Information ==
"Sakura" charted well on the Oricon Singles Chart, taking the number 3 spot for the week and remaining on the charts for two consecutive weeks. This became the group's fifth consecutive single to chart in the top five of the Oricon charts, beginning with "Wanna Be with You", which was released two years prior in March 2012.

The single was released in four editions, a regular CD, two limited edition CD+DVD combo packs, and a limited CD only edition. The standard CD contained the title track, the coupling track "With U" – which was available on every edition – and the corresponding instrumentals. The type A CD+DVD housed the two tracks, the bonus track "Akeneiro Somaru Koro Ni" (茜色染まるころに / "Around Midnight") and their corresponding instrumentals, while the DVD portion contained the music video for "Sakura" and the making video. The limited type B CD+DVD harbored the bonus track "Just Do It" on the CD, while carrying the dance version "Sakura" on the DVD, along with the recording document of the song "With U." The limited CD-only version carried the bonus track "Can't Stop Loving You", along with its instrumental.

The lyrics to "Sakura" were written by AnDisM, while the composition and arrangement was performed by musical composer Yukiyoshi. AnDisM also wrote and composed the single's coupling tracks "With U", "Akeneiro Somaru Koro Ni" and "Just Do It". AnDisM had worked with Lead for their previous song "Green Days", where they wrote both the lyrics and the musical composition.

== Packaging ==
"Sakura" was released in four editions, three of which were limited editions. Along with the standard CD, the single was given two CD+DVD versions with different bonus tracks on the CD portion and differing content on the DVD portions. The limited CD contained one bonus track.

The regular edition contained the title track and the coupling track "With U", along with both songs' instrumentals. The single's cover was also the only one where each member was in a separate frame, while a white border on the bottom housed the title.

The type A limited edition harbored both songs, along with the track "Akeneiro Somaru Koro Ni" and the instrumentals. The DVD contained the music video for "Sakura" and the video's off-shot. The type B limited editions contained the bonus track "Just Do It" coupled with the other tracks. The DVD carried the dance version of "Sakura" and the recording document of "With U". While the type C limited edition did not carry a DVD, it did contain the bonus track "Can't Stop Loving You".

== Track listing ==
All lyrics are written by AnDisM.

CD track listing
No.	Title	Music	Length
1.	"Sakura" (サクラ)	Yukiyoshi	4:06
2.	"With U"	AnDisM	4:25
3.	"Sakura" (instrumental)	Yukiyoshi	4:06
4.	"With U" (instrumental)	AnDisM	4:25
Total length:			17:02

CD (Type A) track listing
No.	Title	Music	Length
1.	"Sakura"	Yukiyoshi	4:06
2.	"With U"	AnDisM	4:25
3.	"Akeneiro Somaru Koro Ni" (茜色染まるころに / "Around Midnight")	AnDisM	3:53
4.	"Sakura" (instrumental)	Yukiyoshi	4:06
5.	"With U" (instrumental)	AnDisM	4:25
6.	"Akeneiro Somaru Koro Ni" (instrumental)	AnDisM	3:50
Total length:			24:45

CD (Type B) track listing
No.	Title	Music	Length
1.	"Sakura"	Yukiyoshi	4:06
2.	"With U"	AnDisM	4:25
3.	"Just Do It"	AnDisM	3:58
4.	"Sakura" (instrumental)	Yukiyoshi	4:06
5.	"With U" (instrumental)	AnDisM	4:25
6.	"Just Do It" (instrumental)	AnDisM	3:55
Total length:			24:55

CD (Type C) track listing
No.	Title	Music	Length
1.	"Sakura"	Yukiyoshi	4:06
2.	"With U"	AnDisM	4:25
3.	"Can't Stop Loving You"	AnDisM	3:38
4.	"Sakura" (instrumental)	Yukiyoshi	4:06
5.	"With U" (instrumental)	AnDisM	4:25
6.	"Can't Stop Loving You" (instrumental)	AnDisM	3:35
Total length:			24:15

DVD (Type A) track listing
No.	Title	Length
1.	"Sakura" (music video)	4:16
2.	"Sakura" (music video off-shot)	19:41

DVD (Type B) track listing
No.	Title	Length
1.	"Sakura" (music video; dance ver.)	4:03
2.	"With U" (recording document)	14:12

== Charts ==
Release	Chart	Peak position
February 26, 2014	Oricon Weekly Singles Chart	3
