= Lead (band) =

Japanese pop group

- Origin: Osaka, Japan
- Genres: J-pop; hip-hop
- Years active: 2002–present
- Labels: Pony Canyon; Flight Master (formerly)
- Members: Shinya Taniuchi; Akira Kagimoto
- Past members: Hiroki Nakadoi; Keita Furuya
- Website: fc-lead.jp lead.tv (redirect as of December 2022)

Lead (/liːd/ LEED) is a Japanese hip-hop dance and vocal group, initially formed under the name Rhymix in Osaka, Japan, in March 2002. They went through two name changes before debuting as "Lead" in May 2002 under the Pony Canyon sub-label Flight Master. The group consists of Shinya Taniuichi and Akira Kagimoto and, formerly, Hiroki Nakadoi and Keita Furuya.

Upon debuting on July 31, 2002 with "Manatsu no Magic", the group experienced early success due to their dancing and vocal skills at a young age. The release of their second single "Show Me the Way" earned the group the Best Newcomer Award during the 44th Japan Record Awards. Their debut album Life on da Beat took the No. 5 spot on the Oricon charts.

In 2010, the group moved from Flight Master to the parent label of Pony Canyon with their single "Speed Star".

Beginning with the single "Wanna Be With You" (2012), the group began a string of top-charting singles. The single peaked at No. 3 on Orion and their singles have continued to chart in the top five. Their album The Showcase (2016) became their highest-charting album at No. 2 and their following album Milestone (2018) became their longest-charting album, remaining on the charts for seven weeks.

In 2013, leader and lead vocalist Hiroki Nakadoi left the group after feelings of inadequacy. The last single he was featured in was "Still", and he officially left the group after their 2012 Upturn tour.

On May 31, 2026, it was announced through Lead's official site that Keita Furuya had left the group due to mental and physical health issues.

== Biography ==
=== Pre-debut and formation of Lead ===
Hiroki Nakadoi, Shinya Taniuchi and Akira Kagimoto all attended the CALESS Vocal & Dance School (キャレスボーカル&ダンススクール) in Osaka, Japan, where they met each other and became good friends. By March 2002, they began doing live street performances on the streets of Shiroten at Osaka Castle Park under the dance unit name of "Rhymix" (リミックス). By May 2002, they renamed the group from "Rhymix" to "flow" and began performing by Kyobashi Station. After the name change, the three decided to recruit a fourth member.

Meanwhile, on April 13, 2002, the Kyushu/Fukuoka Joint Starlight Audition (九州・沖縄合同スターライトオーディション) was being held in Okinawa by Rising Production on a search for new talent. At the time, Keita Furuya and another contestant, Seimi Senoe (瀬上聖未), were declared winners out of the 8,751 hopefuls that auditioned. flow tracked down Keita and he soon joined the group on May 18, 2002.

On May 23, 2002, the group underwent another and final name change, officially becoming "Lead", whereas they had hoped to become a "leading group" of the age.

=== 2002–2007: Debut, Life on da Beat and television roles ===
Around early July 2002, Lead held their first live street performance as four-member group Lead at Osaka Castle Park to demonstrate their skills with dancing, singing and rapping. The event was deemed a success for the group with around 7,000 attendees. Lead also became the opening act for budding group w-inds for their first live tour, 1st Message.

Lead soon released their first single "Manatsu no Magic" on July 31, 2002.

The release of their second single, "Show Me the Way" helped the group take the spot as Best Newcomer Award during the 44th Japan Record Awards, alongside the group Day After Tomorrow and soloists Mika Nakashima and Sachika Shino. In April the following year, they released their debut album, Life on da Beat. It charted at No. 5 on the Oricon Albums Charts, giving the group more success in their early year.

Their following single "Fly Away" also charted in the top ten at No. 10. Charting for seven weeks, it became, at the time, their longest-running single.

In 2003, the group performed the song "Get Wild Life". The song would become the theme song for the 2004 film Kamachi, which all of the members would take part in, with Shinya being the titular character. The film was based on the life of Kamachi Yamada, a young savant who rebelled against the Japanese educational system. He created many works, which was come upon by his family after his untimely death in 1977.

Lead was also featured in the 2003 film Boutaoshi!, alongside fellow label-mates Flame and other Pony Canyon artists. The film was centered around the game bo-taoshi. Shinya took on the lead role of Tsuguo Takayama, who was conned into joining the annual competition. In 2005, Hiroki played Taichi Kobayashi in the TV Tokyo series Pink no Idenshi. The series predominately followed the relationship of Taichi and Natsu Saito (Narumi Konno) throughout their time at Phoenix High School.

=== 2008–2011: Declining sales and annual singles ===
By 2008, Lead had released a total of fourteen singles, five albums, seven DVDs and had performed five live tours. Along with making numerous guest appearances on talk shows, they had hosted their own TV shows, starred in several films and dramas, and had won a total of three Japan Record Awards.

On July 30, 2008, Lead released their 15th single, "Sunnyday". The single failed to break into the top 20 on the Oricon Singles Charts and became their lowest selling single, barely selling 3,000 copies. The single was followed by their first compilation album, Lead Tracks: Listener's Choice. The track list for the album consisted of songs between their 2002 debut with "Manatsu no Magic", up until "Sunnyday", which was released one week prior at the end of July. The songs for the album were voted on by fans throughout East Asia, including Japan, Taiwan, Hong Kong and South Korea. Songs with the highest vote were placed on the album.

On August 5, 2009, they released their 16th single "GiraGira Romantic". This marked the beginning of the group releasing one single a year for the next four years. This would also be their final single released under the Pony Canyon sub-label Flight Master, whereas the group would move to the main label. On July 28, 2010, their 17th single "Speed Star" was released. Their 18th single, "Hurricane", was released on August 10, 2011.

=== 2012–2016: Hiroki Nakadoi's departure and increased popularity ===
In 2012, the group began releasing two singles a year, along with the annual Upturn tours. Every single peaked in the top five on Oricon as the group's popularity and notoriety increased throughout the country.

On March 14, 2012, the group released their highest-ranking single, "Wanna Be With You", which peaked at No. 3 on Oricon. On December 12, 2012, their 20th single "Still" was released, peaking at No. 4. This became the first time since their debut to have two singles in a row to chart in the Top 5 on Oricon.

After Lead celebrated their tenth anniversary with the Leader's Party 10! concert for their fan club in March 2013, Nakadoi stepped away from the group due to the belief that his bandmates had surpassed his abilities and he "shouldn't be with members who are aiming higher".

Prior to Hiroki's final decision, the other members questioned if they should remain as a unit if Nakadoi decided to leave. When Nakadoi finalized his decision, with full support to the others as a group, they chose to stay together due to the constant support of their fans. Before retiring in the entertainment industry, Nakadoi acquired a hairdresser's license and was active as a freelance hairdresser after retirement. He would later open his own salon in 2019.

In 2013, they released the singles "Upturn" and "Green Days/Strings". Both singles peaked in the top five at No. 5 and 4, respectively. They held their annual tour and released Lead Upturn 2013: Leap on DVD and Blu-ray in December. In 2014, the group released the single "Sakura" in February and became their fifth consecutive single to chart in the top five. In September, their single "Omoide Breaker" continued the string, debuting at No. 4. In 2015, they released "My One" and "Yakusoku". While "My One" debuted at No. 3, it took No. 6 on the weekly ranking.

Their seventh studio album, The Showcase, was released four years after their previous album, Now or Never, on June 8, 2016. The album's preceding singles were their highest-charting singles since their debut in 2002, and the album became their highest-charting album in their career, peaking at No. 2. The version of "Still" on the album was redone with only Shinya, Keita and Akira, omitting Hiroki's vocals.

=== 2017–2020: Milestone, Singularity and continued success ===
A year-and-a-half after the release of their single "Yakusoku", on March 8, 2017, the group released their twenty-seventh single, "Tokyo Fever". It kept the group's streak of top-charting singles, charting at No. 5. The song was written by composer duo Clarabell, who had been responsible for other top hits, including Avex artist Koda Kumi's song "Go to the Top", and E-girls songs "Gomennasai no Kissing You" and "Follow Me", among others.

On August 23, they released "Beautiful Day", which debuted at No. 4 before taking No. 6 on the charts. For the song, the group worked with Drew Ryan Scott and Sean Alexander. The coupling track, "Shampoo Bubble" was co-written by Japanese rapper KM-MARKIT, who was originally under the Pony Canyon label between 2005 and 2007 before creating RAIDER MUZIK RECORD music label in 2010.

On April 25, 2018, the group released "Bumblebee", which became their highest debuting single at No. 2.

The group released their eighth studio album on July 19, 2018, titled Milestone. The album became their longest charting album on Oricon, having stayed on the charts for seven weeks. On December 19, 2018, the group released their fifteenth tour DVD/Blu-ray, Lead Upturn 2018: Milestone. The DVD became their highest charting concert video, debuting at No. 17 on the Oricon DVD/Blu-ray charts.

On January 30, 2019, the group released their thirtieth single "Be the Naked", which peaked at No. 6 on the Oricon Daily Singles Charts. They released their thirty-first single, "Summer Vacation", on July 24, 2019. They held several live events to help promote the single, with certain lives offering an After Party, which were only available to fan club members. The single debuted at No. 6 on the charts, continuing their streak of top 10 singles. It was followed by "Hide and Seek/Sunset Refrain", which charted at No. 3. Despite being a double a-side, only the music video for "Sunset Refrain" was on the DVD. The music video for "Hide and Seek" was released on their ninth studio album, Singularity, which was released a month later on March 18, 2020.

Singularity debuted at No. 12 on Oricon, becoming their first album in twelve years to not debut in the top ten.

The group collaborated with Taiwanese singer/songwriter Ssu Wei Lu (best known by his stage name GboySwag) in February 2020 for the Japanese version of the song "Chao Zhan Kai" (超展開 / Super Expansion), originally released on his 2019 album Chong Dong (虫洞 / Wormhole). The music video for the song was uploaded to the official YouTube for BinMusic on February 17, 2020.

=== 2020–2021: Response to COVID-19, Joy Joy Home Mix and singles ===
Beginning in April 2020, Lead became recurring guests on Tokyo MX to take part in Japan's "stay at home" order due to the COVID-19 pandemic. This was to bring entertainment to the country's residents. On May 6, they released their first solo remix album, Joy Joy Home Mix. The album was released digitally as a continuing factor in Lead's participation.

On September 23, 2020, Lead released their first single post-Singularity, titled "Tuxedo". It continued their release of top ten singles, debuting at No. 5 on Oricon. The music video for it was choreographed by label-mate Tomohiro Taniguchi of Da Pump, who had created the choreography for their own summer hit "U.S.A." It was used as the ending theme song to the TBS show Hiruobi! beginning on the first of the month. They released two more videos to correspond with the single: a choreography version of "Tuxedo" and a video for "Kangoku Rokku" (a cover of Elvis Presley's 1957 "Jailhouse Rock"), the latter of which premiered on the streaming site YouTube the day before the single's release on September 22.

On April 11, Lead held their Lead Online Live 2021 ~GuiDance~ concert, which was filmed at Zepp Tokyo.

On July 30, it was announced that rapper Shinya Taniuchi had tested positive for the coronavirus. Due to this, several of their scheduled activities were cancelled, including their live performance that was to be streamed on the popular streaming site YouTube on July 31 to celebrate their 19th anniversary. Other events cancelled included their collaboration with the group Boys and Men (BOYS AND MEN), which was scheduled for August 1.

On August 25, Lead released their single Sonic Boom. It debuted at No. 10 on Oricon.

Beginning in October 2021, member Keita Furuya began taking part in the musical Mademoiselle Mozart, where played the role of Shikaneda.

In November, Lead collaborated with fellow labelmates DA PUMP and w-inds for the song "The Christmas Song", which was placed on w-inds' album 20XX: We Are (November 24, 2021). On December 10, the group performed their concert Lead Upturn 2021 Online Live ~Sonic Boom~ at Tokyo Totemono Brillia Hall at the "harevutai" theater, which is a modernized concert hall made for CG lives.

=== 2022–2023: Lead the Best, 20th Anniversary Live, and post-COVID activities ===
On March 22, a dance version of the song "Get Over" was released on Lead's official YouTube. The video was choreographed by Shinya and Keita, while the editing was done by member Akira. The song was originally the coupling track on their Sonic Boom single.

On March 30, 2022, Lead released their second online live concert video. Lead Upturn 2021 Online Live: Sonic Boom & GuiDance became their eighteenth video release, debuting at No. 12 on the Oricon DVD charts. The video held their concerts for Lead Upturn 2021 Online Live ~Sonic Boom~ and Lead Online Live 2021 ~GuiDance~, both which were performed without a live audience due to COVID-19 precautions.

Beginning April 2, member Keita Furuya became a cast member in the Rodgers and Hammerstein musical Flower Drum Song, taking on the role of One Tarr. On April 22, performances of the musical were cancelled due to some of the performers falling ill. In July, Akira began starring in the stage adaptation of Night Head 2041, playing the lead role of Naoto Kirihara, alongside actor Hiroki Ino.

The group released their first compilation album in fourteen years titled Lead the Best on July 31. It peaked at No. 5 on Oricon. In partner with the release of the album, the trio performed live at Tachikawa Stage Garden the same day with the performance titled 20th Anniversary Live ~Kan Ima Shirube-sai~ (感今導祭 / Guiding Emotions). In an interview with USEN Encore about the release of the album and performance, the group said how their biggest turning point as a group was the 2013 release of "Upturn", whereas it was the first release without their former leader, Nakadoi Hiroki.

Beginning January 2023, the original site for Lead had merged with that of their fanclub's.

In January, Akira performed in the musical adaptation of the Cesare manga, which was planned for release in 2020, but was postponed due to the COVID-19 pandemic. Akira made appearances for the performances held on January 30 and 31.

In March 2023, Keita began playing the character Roger Davis in the rock musical Rent. On March 21, they released the live video 20th Anniversary Live: Kankin Dousai & Snow Magic. It debuted at No. 8 on Oricon. Their anniversary live was performed the same day as their debut in 2002, on July 31, 2022 at Tachikawa Stage Garden in Tachikawa, Tokyo.

At the end of April, Lead held their commemorative performances for their album Singularity, which had initially been cancelled in 2020 due to the COVID-19 pandemic in Japan.

Lead released their thirty-fifth single See Your Heart on May 24. It was their first single since Sonic Boom in 2021 and debuted at No. 5. The title track was composed by Masa Takumi, who had previously won the 65th Grammy Award for "Best Global Music Album" for his 2022 album Sakura. The group released Movies Best on September 27, which housed every music video since their debut. On October 6, Lead released their first digital single, "Billionaire". The day of its release, the group held a campaign to promote the song, offering prizes to those who streamed the song the most on Line Music. The track was written by Shōko Fujibayashi, who had previously written "Night Deluxe" in 2004. Member Shinya designed the single's cover. On October 14, the group started the first leg of their 2023 tour, Lead Upturn 2023: Jack in the Beats.

=== 2024-present: Passing of Shinya's father, XTLIKE and digital singles ===
Lead brought in 2024 with an announcement of member Shinya opening an official TikTok account. Members Keita and Akira had already been active on the application, with Akira opening an account in 2020 and Keita in 2021. On February 24, Lead held their annual live, Lead Winter Live ~Snow Magic 2024~. That following day, they released their second digital single, "Jack in the Beats." The song originally debuted during their concert of the same name.

In April 2024, Shinya's father died after seven years of battling chronic illness. Six months after his passing, Shinya would compose and write a song in his memory. He posted the song to his personal Instagram on October 19.

On May 31, 2026, it was announced through Lead's official site that member Keita Furuya had left the group due to strain on his mental and physical health.

== Members ==
=== Current members ===
- Shinya Taniuchi (谷内伸也, Taniuchi Shinya)
- Akira Kagimoto (鍵本輝, Kagimoto Akira)

=== Former members ===
- Hiroki Nakadoi (中土居宏宜, Nakadoi Hiroki) — left on March 31, 2013
- Keita Furuya (古屋敬多, Furuya Keita) — left on May 31, 2026

== Discography ==
=== Studio albums ===
- 2003: Life on da Beat
- 2004: Brand New Era
- 2005: Lead! Heat! Beat!
- 2006: 4
- 2008: Feel The Vibes
- 2012: Now or Never
- 2016: The Showcase
- 2018: Milestone
- 2020: Singularity
- 2024: XTLIKE

=== Compilation albums ===
- 2008: Lead Tracks: Listener's Choice
- 2022: Lead the Best

=== Remix albums ===
- 2003: Buddies (W-inds, Flame, Lead)
- 2020: Joy Joy Home Mix

== Filmography ==
=== Films ===
- Boutaoshi! (2003)
- Deep Love (2004)
- Kamachi (2004)
- Oretachi no Ashita (2014)

=== Television ===
- Konya wa Kokoro Dake Daite (2014)

== Awards and accolades ==
Year	Award	Category	Nominated work	Result
2002	44th Japan Record Awards	Best New Artist Award	"Show Me the Way"	Won
2004	46th Japan Record Awards	Gold Award	"Night Deluxe"	Won
2005	47th Japan Record Awards	Gold Award	"Atarashii Kisetsu e"	Won

== See also ==
- List of bands from Japan
