= Now or Never (Lead album) =

Studio album by Lead
- Released: July 18, 2012
- Recorded: 2009–2012
- Genre: Hip hop, pop, R&B
- Label: Pony Canyon

Lead chronology
Lead Tracks: Listener's Choice (2008)	Now or Never (2012)	The Showcase (2016)

Singles from Now or Never
- 1. "GiraGira Romantic" Released: August 5, 2009; 2. "Speed Star" Released: July 28, 2010; 3. "Hurricane" Released: August 10, 2011; 4. "Wanna Be With You" Released: March 14, 2012

Now or Never is the sixth studio album by Japanese hip-hop group Lead, released on July 18, 2012, under the Pony Canyon label. It was their first album to chart in the top ten on the Oricon charts since their debut album Life on da Beat (2003) coming in at #6 and remaining on the charts for two weeks.

The album was their first album in four years and contained four preluding singles: "GiraGira Romantic", "Speed Star", "Hurricane" and "Wanna Be with You". Both "Hurricane" and "Wanna Be with You" charted in the top ten, with "Wanna Be with You" charting at #3. It was their first album to be released in multiple editions: CD, CD+DVD and two 2CD editions with different content.

Now or Never was their last album with lead vocalist Hiroki Nakadoi, as, after their following single "Still", he left the group due to feelings of inadequacy.

== Information ==
Now or Never charted high on the Oricon Albums Charts, taking the #6 spot and remaining on the charts for two consecutive weeks. The album charted better than their last studio album, Feel the Vibes, which had only peaked at #44.

Prior to the album's release, there were four preluding singles over the course of three years, beginning with "GiraGira Romantic" on August 5, 2009. "GiraGira Romantic" was released a year after their last single "Sunnyday" and album Lead Tracks: Listener's Choice. "Gira gira" is a Japanese sound effect, which typically denotes something shiny or sparkling. The single "GiraGira Romantic" would also be the first time Lead would release different editions of their singles, outside of the standard CD and CD+DVD combo.

Their following single, "Speed Star", would carry an updated version of their song "Virgin Blue", which was originally released in March 2006. This version would be placed on the second disc of the Type B edition of the album. The following singles, "Hurricane" and "Wanna Be with You", both charted in the top ten on the Oricon Singles Charts at #8 and #3 respectively. Some of the coupling tracks from the singles would be placed on the Type C editions of the album.

The album became their first album to be released with multiple editions, a standard CD, a CD+DVD combo and two different 2CD versions, the latter three of which were of limited release. Each edition contained different content. The 2CD Jacket B edition contained both the studio album on the first disc, while the second disc harbored a compilation of all their previous a-sides, some of which were updated for their tenth anniversary release. The 2CD Jacket C edition contained both the studio album on the first disc and a collection of the groups best coupling tracks from past singles, some of which were rearranged for the album. The new song "Burning Up!" was also included on the second disc. For the CD+DVD edition, the music video for "Stand and Fight" was included, which was the main promotional track for Now or Never.

Now or Never would become Lead's final album with lead vocalist Hiroki Nakadoi, whereas Hiroki resigned due to feeling inadequate compared to his fellow members. After the group celebrated their tenth anniversary with the Leader's Party 10! concert for their fan club in March 2013, vocalist Hiroki Nakadoi stepped away from the group. His final single release with Lead would be with their single "Still", which had been released on December 12, 2012 – his departure would come the following year in April.

== Hiroki's departure ==
After receiving the opportunity to debut at the age of 17, the past 10 and a half years I spent as a member of Lead was a wonderful time beyond words. I was able to get here thanks to the support of many people, and I was also able to experience things that not everyone can experience, something irreplaceable in my life. . . . Because of you all, I have been able to come this far.

— Nakadoi Hiroki, To Everyone

After Lead celebrated their tenth anniversary with the Leader's Party 10! concert for their fan club in March 2013, vocalist Hiroki Nakadoi stepped away from the group. His final single release with Lead was for their single Still, which had been released on December 12, 2012, and his departure was in April the following year.

Hiroki began to discuss his feelings about leaving to the other members prior to his departure, explaining how he felt that they had surpassed him since they debuted in 2002 with "Manatsu no Magic"; however, due to their reassurance and saying that they would all "do their best together", he had decided to stay on, putting more effort into his overall performance. Despite this, he fell into a depression, believing that he was unable to "catch up" to his friends' level and began talking about wanting to leave again. He said how he felt that, due to him still not having any self-confidence, he "shouldn't be with the members who are aiming higher and . . . relying on the kindness of the staff members . . . and the Leaders (their fans)."

Prior to Hiroki making his final decision, the other members, Keita Furuya, Akira Kagimoto and Shinya Tanuichi, had questioned if they should remain as a unit if Hiroki decided to leave. When Hiroki finalized his decision, with full support to the others as a group, they chose to stay together due to the constant support of their fans.

It is such a big thing that our leader is graduating, but we, the three of us, will continue holding up Lead's motto "Stand and Fight," and keep on going as Lead with our full effort, in order to see an even more vivid future with you Leaders.

— Shinya Tanuichi, Keita Furuya, Akira Kagimoto

== Music video ==
Despite music videos for "GiraGira Romantic", "Speed Star", "Hurricane" and "Wanna Be with You" being released prior to the album, none of the videos made it to Now or Never. Instead, the new video "Stand and Fight" was performed for the album, becoming the main promotional track.

The video opens with what appears to be a rundown storage facility and the members of Lead utilizing their skills in both hip-hop street dancing and break dancing. Throughout the video, they are shown both in and around the building, each given a solo spotlight. The room is both doused in white and red light, their wardrobe changing depending on the scene. The color red was most likely chosen to symbolize strength and the willing to fight, given the color's connotations.

On January 26, 2012, the full video was uploaded to Lead's official YouTube, six months prior to the album's release in July.

== Track listing ==
Now or Never track listing
No.	Title	Lyrics	Music	Arranger(s)	Length
1.	"Stand and Fight"	Lead	Davor Vulama • Richard Harris	Seiji Motoyama	4:01
2.	"Real Live"	Koji Hayashi • HAYATO	Gavin Daniels	Gavin Daniels	3:05
3.	"Speed Star"	Lantana • Shinya Taniuchi	Yuki Saki	Suzuki Kisaburo	3:22
4.	"One More Side"	Yasushi Watanabe	Yasushi Watanabe	Yasushi Watanabe	4:42
5.	"Can't Get Enough"	7chi子♪	Davor Vulama • Eric Soloman	Seiji Motoyama	3:28
6.	"Voice"	AnDisM	AnDisM	ikutaMachine	4:02
7.	"Wonder Mirror"	7chi子♪	Neil Krin • Noel Cohen • Tommy Lamendola	Seiji Motoyama	3:27
8.	"Tokio Night" (10th Anniversary MIX)	shonen-JET	shonen-JET		5:05
9.	"Boom!! Boom!!"	LMPSH	LMPSH	Seiji Motoyama	3:18
10.	"Hurricane"	Hirofumi Asamoto • Shinya Taniuchi	Hirofumi Asamoto	Seiji Motoyama	4:03
11.	"Wanna Be with You"	Lead • Seiji Motoyama	Vincent Degiorgio • David Fremberg	Seiji Motoyama	3:34
12.	"Come Along!"	Yasushi Watanabe	Yasushi Watanabe	Yasushi Watanabe	5:00
Total length:					47:07

DVD
No.	Title	Length
1.	"Stand and Fight" (music video)	4:13
2.	"Stand and Fight" (making video)

Disc 2 (Jacket B)
No.	Title	Lyrics	Music	Arranger(s)	Length
1.	"Manatsu no Magic"	Yasushi Sasamoto	Yasushi Sasamoto	Yasushi Sasamoto	3:50
2.	"Show Me the Way" (10th anniversary ver.)	Yasushi Sasamoto		Yasushi Sasamoto
3.	"Fly Away" (10th anniversary ver.)	Yasushi Sasamoto • KATSU		Yasushi Sasamoto
4.	"Funky Days!"	Enoki Tsuchi Atsushi	Shinji Tamura	Shinji Tamura	4:10
5.	"Get Wild Life"	Shinji Tamura • Katsu	Shinji Tamura	Shinji Tamura	3:39
6.	"Night Deluxe" (10th anniversary ver.)	Shōko Fujibayashi		Daisuke "D.I" Imai
7.	"Tenohira wo Taiyou ni"	Takashi Yanase	Nawata Hisashi	Taku Izumi	3:03
8.	"Delighted"	Shōko Fujibayashi • Mr. Blistah	Tatsuyuki Okawa	Tatsuyuki Okawa	4:33
9.	"Atarashii Kisetsu e"	Kyogo Kawaguchi	Yoshiaki Mutou	Yoshiaki Mutou	6:14
10.	"Baby Runnin' Wild"	Shatori Shiraishi	Shatori Shiraishi	Shatori Shiraishi	2:45
11.	"Virgin Blue 2010"	Yoshiaka Sagara	Haya	Suzuki Kisaburo	3:40
12.	"Summer Madness"	Nice Hashimoto	Yasunori Tanaka • Nice Hashimoto	Motonari Murakawa	3:22
13.	"Drive Alive"	Lisa	Ken Iijima • Daisuke Kahara	Y.T.H	3:30
14.	"Umi"	MJ	Seiji Motoyama	MJ	5:24
15.	"Stand Up!"	Lead	Seiji Motoyama	Seiji Motoyama	3:21
16.	"Sunnyday"	Lead	Seiji Motoyama	Seiji Motoyama	4:14
17.	"GiraGira Romantic"	leonn	Toru Watanabe • Hirofumi Hibino	Hiroaki Serizawa	4:02

Disc 2 (Jacket C)
No.	Title	Lyrics	Music	Arranger(s)	Length
1.	"Wanna Be with You" (prologue)	Seiji Motoyama	Vincent DeGiorgio • David Fremberg	Seiji Motoyama	3:33
2.	"Can't Stop"	Seiji Motoyama	Seiji Motoyama	Vincent DeGiorgio • Johan "Jones" Wetterberg • Jakob Hazell • Svante Halldin • Per Eklund	3:48
3.	"Hungry Sniper"	Kenji Hayashida	Kenji Hayashida	Makoto Sakuma	5:18
4.	"Unbalanced Kiss o Shite" (album ver.)	Hiroshi Yamada • Shinya Tanuichi	Hiro Takahashi	IkutaMachine	3:46
5.	"Stay with Me" (Album ver.)	Akira Kagimoto	Seiji Motoyama	Seiji Motoyama	4:02
6.	"Speechless"	Lantana • Shinya Tanuichi	Pontus Söderqvist • Vincent DeGiorgio • Bjorn Djupstrom	Pontus Söderqvist • Vincent DeGiorgio • Bjorn Djupstrom	3:39
7.	"Burning Up!"	Akira Kagimoto • Shinya Tanuichi	Akira Kagimoto	Seiji Motoyama	3:50
8.	"24Hrs" (live mix)	Seiji Motoyama	Vincent DeGirogio • Johan "Jones" Wetterberg • Lawrence "Woo" Allen	Seiji Motoyama	3:15
9.	"Hikari" (album ver.)	Keita Furuya • Shinya Tanuichi	Ono Kazunari	shonen-JET	4:09
10.	"Sun×You"	Lead	Akira Kagimoto	Seiji Motoyama	5:15
11.	"Color"	Minori	Seiji Motoyama	Seiji Motoyama	4:39
12.	"High Tension Day"	Lead	Seiji Motoyama	Seiji Motoyama • Lead	4:13
Total length:					49:27

== Charts ==
Release	Chart	Peak position
July 18, 2012	Oricon Weekly Albums Chart	6
