= Lead Upturn 2023: Jack in the Beats =

Video by Lead
- Released: March 20, 2024
- Recorded: 2023
- Genre: Pop, hip hop
- Label: Pony Canyon; DVD (PCBP-54630); Blu-ray (PCXP-51056)

Lead chronology
Movies Best (2023)	Lead Upturn 2023: Jack in the Beats (2024)

Lead Upturn 2023: Jack in the Beats (stylized as Lead Upturn 2023 ～Jack in the Beats～) is the twentieth concert video released by Japanese hip-hop group Lead. The concert video was released on March 20, 2024. It received a weekly ranking at No. 13 on the Oricon DVD charts.

Due to having no corresponding album, the tour borrowed songs from various singles, including their then-most recent single "See Your Heart". It also featured original songs "Billionaire" and "Jack in the Beats."

== Information ==
Lead Upturn 2023 ~Jack in the Beats~ is the twentieth concert video released by Lead. It was released on March 20, 2024, one year after their previous concert video for their 20th anniversary. It charted at No. 13 on the Oricon DVD charts and remained on the charts for two consecutive weeks.

The video was released on both DVD and Blu-ray. The concert carried songs from prior singles, including their more recent single "See Your Heart", which had been released earlier that year in May. Many of the songs the trio performed were coupling tracks to various singles. Both the Blu-ray and DVD releases contained a twelve-page booklet and behind-the-scenes footage and interviews.

During the tour, the group debuted two new tracks: "Billionaire" and "Jack in the Beats," the latter of which was written by member Akira Kagimoto. Both songs would be released as digital singles and later placed on their studio album XTLIKE.

The performance utilized on the DVD and Blu-ray was of their November 26, 2023 performance at the Nippon Seinenkan in Shinjuku, Tokyo.

== Track listing ==
<Opening>

1. "Billionaire"
2. "Love or Love?"
3. "Sonic Boom"
4. "Drop in the Box"
5. "My Beast"
6. "Te Quiero Mucho"
7. "Tuxedo"
8. "Virgin Blue 2010"
9. "Higher Love"
10. "Always Love"
11. "Seasons"
12. "One More Side"
13. "Wonder Mirror"
14. "Michishirube"
15. "Jack in the Beats"
16. "Tokyo Fever"
17. "Singularity"
  -Encore-
18. "Kokorozashi"
19. "See Your Heart"
20. "Azayakana Sekai"
  Bonus Footage
21. "Lead Upturn 2023 ~Jack in the Beats~" (Behind the Scenes)
22. "MC Collection"

== Charts (Japan) ==
Release	Chart	Peak position	Chart run
March 20, 2024	Oricon DVD/Blu-ray Charts	13	2 weeks
