= Rhett Fisher =

American actor

- Born: Rhett Tyler Fisher; May 22, 1980 (age 46); Indianapolis, Indiana, United States
- Occupations: Songwriter, producer, singer, actor
- Years active: 1995–present
- Height: 6 ft 1 in (185 cm)

Rhett Tyler Fisher (born May 22, 1980) is an American actor, singer, songwriter and record producer. As an actor, he is best known for playing Ryan Mitchell, the Titanium Ranger in Power Rangers Lightspeed Rescue.

== Songwriting discography and producing credits ==
- "The Way You Light" by YUSII (2025) Sony Music Labels Inc.
- "Paradise" by Psychic Fever from Exile Tribe (2025) LDH Records
- "Pasadena" by Yu Sakai (2024) Universal Music LLC
- "Walk On The Wild Side" by Rhett Fisher (2024) Extreme Music
- "Drippin" by Rhett Fisher (2024) Megatrax Music
- "Don't Fight The Rhythm!" by Brandon Rogers, Rhett Fisher, Devin Hoffman (2024) Walt Disney Records/Pixar
- "Sunrise (Fable)" by Chris River, Rhett Fisher (2024) Smilax Productions
- "Future" by Chris River feat Rhett Fisher (2024) Enforce the Sound
- "Kyoumitainahibokura" by Yesung (2023) Avex Music Creative Inc.
- "Celebrate" by Little Glee Monster (2023) Sony Music Labels Inc.
- "Christmastide" by Cravity (2023) Starship Entertainment
- "Heart To Heart" by Genki Iwahashi (2023) Rookie
- "Bitter Sweet" by UVERworld (2023) Sony Music Labels Inc.
- "Hanamukeno Kotoba" by Kamiji Yusuke (2023) Sony Music Labels Inc.
- "360 Do" by SOR (2023) Lossless
- "My Generation" Rhett Fisher (2023) Extreme Music
- "Break Down My Life" Rhett Fisher (2023) Extreme Music
- "365" by Salasnich feat Rhett Fisher (2023) Place Called Home
- "ENEA" by Chris River feat Rhett Fisher (2023) Enforce the Sound
- "T.O.K.Y.O." by PKCZ (2022) LDH JAPAN
- "BANG!" by J-JUN Kim Jae-joong (2022) First JB music
- "Gemini" by Damian Breath feat Rhett Fisher (2022) Enforce The Sound
- "Devil Eyes" by Damian Breath feat Rhett Fisher (2022) Enforce The Sound
- "Would I Lie to You" by The Regos feat Rhett Fisher (2022) Enforce The Sound
- "SUMMERTIME" by Genki Iwahashi (2022) Rookie
- "Knew Me" by Melanie Injeyan (2022)
- "Number One Guy" by Rhett Fisher (2022) Voyant
- "Everything I Overcome" by Rhett Fisher (2022) Voyant
- "Fearless" by Rhett Fisher (2022) Voyant
- "Love Myself" by Rhapsody (2022) Dreamusic
- "You Know What It's Like" by Salasnich feat Rhett Fisher (2022) Storm Music
- "Futures Past" by Damian Breath feat Rhett Fisher (2022) Enforce the Sound
- "BESUTOCHIIMU" by Rhapsody (2022) Dreamusic
- "ANO SORA WO HARASU TAMAENO LIST" by Rhapsody (2022) Dreamusic
- "CHIISANA KAMISAMA" by Pink Flag (2022) Dreamusic
- "NIJI WO OIKAKENAIKA" by Rhapsody (2022) Dreamusic
- "Kenkon Itteki" by Haru No Jyujika (2022) Dreamusic
- "Dai Ni Shou" by Pink Flag (2022) Dreamusic
- "I Believe" by Sing 4 Rhaspody (2022) Dreamusic
- "Fist to the Sky" (2022) Sounds of Red Bull
- "Tropical" by Chris River feat Rhett Fisher (2022) Enforce the Sound
- "Skyline" by Damian Breath feat Rhett Fisher (2021) Enforce the Sound
- "Lie To Me" by David Lenders feat Rhett Fisher (2021) Blanco y Negro Records
- "Feeling Like Myself" (2021) Extreme Music
- "Love Me Better" by Shayla Souliere (2021)
- "Follow The Light" by Shayla Souliere (2021)
- "Unsend" by Shayla Souliere (2021)
- "All I See Is You" by Chris River & Pards feat Rhett Fisher (2021) Enforce the Sound
- "I'll Never Back Down" feat. Malcom Rapwell (2021) Extreme Music
- "With Me All Along" by Rhett Fisher (2021) Extreme Music
- "Drink You Up" by Rhett Fisher (2021) Extreme Music
- "Boys" by Rhett Fisher (2021) Extreme Music
- "Kiss and Tell" by Salasnich feat Rhett Fisher (2021) Soave Records
- "Heart Of Stone" by Dankann feat Rhett Fisher (2021) Enforce the Sound
- "I'm On Top" by Rhett Fisher (2021) Juice Music
- "Outta My Head" by Rhett Fisher (2021) Voyant
- "Hold On" by Rhett Fisher (2021) Voyant APM Music
- "My Christmas Wish" by Rhett Fisher (2020) Extreme Music
- "Christmas in Your Eyes" by Rhett Fisher (2020) Extreme Music
- "Never Been Better" by Rhett Fisher (2021) Extreme Music
- "Shake It Loose" by Rhett Fisher (2020) Extreme Music
- "Electric Vibes" by Rhett Fisher (2020) Extreme Music
- "Good Life" by Rhett Fisher (2020) Extreme Music
- "Wild Fight" by Lead (2020) Pony Canyon
- "Flashback" by Chris River & Pards feat Rhett Fisher (2020) Enforce the Sound
- "Back To Life" by Project Dirty (2020) Project Dirty
- "Dimensions" by Chris River & Pards feat Rhett Fisher (2020) Enforce the Sound
- "Undone" by Tori Marshall (2020)
- "Be" by Tori Marshall (2020)
- "Games" by Heather Cole (2020)
- "Sleep Alone" by Mango Passion feat Rhett Fisher (2020)
- "Do You Cry" by Mark Dright feat Rhett Fisher (2020) Wikolia Music
- "Nights Like These" by Will Jay (2019) Notting Hill Music
- "Lobby" by Alexis Lynn feat. Malaynah (2019)
- "Started Here and Now" by Rhett Fisher (2019) Extreme Music
- "Buckle Up" by Klave feat. Rhett Fisher, (2019) TGR Music Group, distributed by Sony Music Entertainment Sweden AB
- "K.O.T.B." by Ksuke (2019) Warner Music Japan
- "Over Getting Over You" by Annie LeBlanc (2019)
- "Exhibition" (original title: Take Me Back) by LEAD (2019) FujiPacific Music
- "Nothing's Gonna Hold Us Back" by Oovee feat. Rhett Fisher, (2018) Universal Music Italia
- "Yakusoku No Basho" by Fearless (2018) Moving Factory
- "Talking To Myself" by Salasnich & Rhett Fisher feat. Rhett Fisher, (2018) EGOMusic
- "Summer Dreams" by Salasnich feat. Rhett Fisher, (2018) EGOMusic
- "Radiant" by TANGRAM (2018) Banana Culture
- "Be Free" by Stage Rockers feat. Rhett Fisher (2018) NoDefinition
- "Getaway" by Asher Angel (2018) Disney
- "Madness" by Chantelle Paige (2018) Revealed Recordings
- "Insomnia" by Zigmeister feat. Rhett Fisher (2018) Space Born
- "Summer Dreams" by Salasnich & Rhett Fisher feat. Rhett Fisher, (2018) EGOMusic
- "In My DNA" by Rhett Fisher (2017) Extreme Music
- "No Pressure" by Rhett Fisher (2017) Extreme Music
- "Hooked On You" by Rhett Fisher (2017) Extreme Music
- "Please Don't Love Me" by Rhett Fisher (2017) Extreme Music
- "MAD" by Rhett Fisher (2017) Pendustry Music
- "Summertime" by Rhett Fisher (2017) Pendustry Music
- "Where The Stars Go" by Alex Milani feat. Rhett Fisher, (2017) Executiva Music
- "Gasoline" by Tommy Fredvang (2016) daWorks
- "All Alone" by Flatdisk feat. Rhett Fisher, (2016) Flamingo Recordings
- "Get Down" by Oovee feat. Rhett Fisher, (2016) Universal Music Italia
- "G.O.M.D." by ERIK (2016) Pacific Records/O-Face
- "Tell Me No Lies" by Max Zotti & Luca Guerrieri feat. Rhett Fisher, (2016) D:vision Records
- "Let It Go" by Delayers feat. Rhett Fisher, (2016) Universal Music Italia
- "Don't Kill the Night" by Oovee & Flatdisk feat. Rhett Fisher, (2015) Universal Music Italia
- "Let It Snow Let It Snow Let It Snow" by Francfranc feat. Rhett Fisher, (2015) Frog Music
- "Not That Smart" by Heather Cole and Rayvon Owen, (2015)
- "Dirty Blonde" by Diamante, (2015) Diamond Certified Records/XLP
- "No Sexin' on the Beach" by Diamante, (2015) Diamond Certified Records/XLP
- "Just in Time" by Project Dirty (2015)
- "Firecracker" by Skylar Stecker, (2015) CherryTree/Interscope Records
- "Rooftop" by Skylar Stecker, (2015) CherryTree/Interscope Records
- "Boom Boom (feat. Sean Kingston)" by Dyllan Murray, (2014) Wild Oak Entertainment
- "Trophy Girl" by Dyllan Murray, (2014) Wild Oak Entertainment
- "Wake Up The Night" by Project Dirty, (2014)
- "Bite Your Kiss" by Diamante, (2014) Diamond Certified Records/XLP
- "Skywalker" by Project Dirty, (2014)
- "Blue Fire" by Project Dirty, (2014)
- "Can't Stop Us" by Project Dirty, (2014)
- "Raise the Bar" by Project Dirty, (2014)
- "End of the World" by Project Dirty, (2014)
- "A Little Too Late" by Project Dirty, (2014)
- "Cut Me Like A Knife" by Project Dirty, (2014)
- "HD Love" by Project Dirty, (2014)
- "Strobe Hearts" by Project Dirty, (2014)
- "Eye of the Storm" by Project Dirty, (2014)
- "Little Bit Too Much" by Skylar Stecker, (2013)
- "On The Record" by Cimorelli, (2013)
- "Replay" by Kira Kosarin, (2013)
- "Name in the Sky" by Project Dirty, (2013)
- "Melt The Dance Floor" by J Rome, (2013) Hollywood/Disney Records
- "Get You Off" by My Crazy Girlfriend, (2012)
- "Boomerang" by Skee-lo (2012) Skee-lo Music/Whatevoak Ent.
- "Knockout" by Project Dirty (2012)
- "True Lies" by Project Dirty (2012)
- "Wallpaper" by Project Dirty (2012)
- "Soundtrack 4 Life" by Project Dirty (2012)
- "Last Night" by Project Dirty (2012)
- "Night Drive" by Project Dirty (2012)
- "Frozen" by Project Dirty (2012)
- "Escape" by Project Dirty (2012)
- "Radio Love Song" by Project Dirty (2012)
- "Crash" by Project Dirty (2012)
- "Hit List" by Olivia Faye (2012)
- "The Night Is Young" by Brooklyn Haley (2012) Parimore Music
- "Boomerang" by Brooklyn Haley (2012) Parimore Music
- "Leave Me My Pen" by Tino Coury, Album: Page One (2011) Eleventh Records
- "RollerCoaster" by Project Dirty (2011)
- "RollerCoaster Remix" by Project Dirty (2011)
- "Holding On" by Project Dirty (2011)
- "Addicted" by Project Dirty (2011)
- "Black and Blue" by Project Dirty (2011)
- "4th of July by Project Dirty (2011)
- "The Fall" by Project Dirty (2011)
- "S.E.X." by Project Dirty (2011)
- "Upside Down" by Project Dirty (2011)
- "Poisonous" by Project Dirty (2011)
- "All Systems Go" by Project Dirty (2011)
- "Senses" by Anoop Desai, Album: All Is Fair (2010)
- "Because of You" by Tim, Album: New Beginnings (2010) Sony Music
- "Liquid" by Tim, Album: New Beginnings (2010) Sony Music
- "One Night" by Brandon Rogers, Album: Automatic (2008) Authentik Artists
- "Call Me Back" by Brandon Rogers, Album: Automatic (2008) Authentik Artists
- "Here I Am" by Manic Mind (2007) Free Music
- "On The Wall" by Manic Mind (2007) Free Music
- "Mercy" by Manic Mind (2007) Free Music
- "No Tomorrow" by Manic Mind (2007) Free Music
- "Kerosine Girl" by Manic Mind (2007) Free Music
- "Dirty Star" by Manic Mind (2007) Free Music
- "Closer" by Manic Mind (2007) Free Music
- "Surrender" by Manic Mind (2007) Free Music
- "Autumn's Song" by Manic Mind (2007) Free Music
- "Blind Alibi" by Manic Mind (2007) Free Music
- "When Tears Collide" by Manic Mind (2007) Free Music
- "Dissolve" by Manic Mind (2007) Free Music
- "Changes" by Manic Mind (2007) Free Music
- "All She Wanted" by Manic Mind (2007) Free Music

== Filmography ==
=== Film ===
- Nightingale: A Melody of Life (2021)... (lyricist)/(playback singer)
- Revenge of the Bimbot Zombie Killers (2014)... Jedediah
- Boomerang (2012)... himself
- Cup O' Joe (2004) .... Craig Jones
- Micro Mini Kids (2001) (V) .... Spike

=== Television ===
- Flashing Lives
  - Welcome to LA (2011) ... Brian Minks
- In the Moment (2010) ... Promoter
- Maybe It's Me
  - The Fever Episode (2002) .... Prince William
  - The Mini-Jerry Episode (2001) .... Prince William
- Power Rangers Time Force
  - Time for Lightspeed (2001) .... Ryan Mitchell/Titanium Ranger
- Power Rangers Lightspeed Rescue (2000) TV Series .... Ryan Mitchell/Titanium Ranger
  - The Fate of Lightspeed: Part 2 (2000) ... Ryan Mitchell / Titanium Ranger
  - The Fate of Lightspeed: Part 1 (2000) ... Ryan Mitchell / Titanium Ranger
  - Rise of the Super Demons (2000) ... Ryan Mitchell / Titanium Ranger (credit only)
  - Wrath of the Queen (2000) ... Ryan Mitchell / Titanium Ranger (credit only)
  - In the Limelight (2000) ... Ryan Mitchell / Titanium Ranger (credit only)
  - Web War (2000) ... Ryan Mitchell / Titanium Ranger (credit only)
  - Neptune's Daughter (2000) ... Ryan Mitchell / Titanium Ranger (credit only)
  - Olympius Unbound (2000) ... Ryan Mitchell / Titanium Ranger (credit only)
  - Sorcerer of the Sands (2000) ... Ryan Mitchell / Titanium Ranger
  - The Last Ranger (2000) ... Ryan Mitchell / Titanium Ranger (credit only)
  - Trakeena's Revenge: Part 2 (2000) ... Ryan Mitchell / Titanium Ranger (credit only)
  - Trakeena's Revenge: Part 1 (2000) ... Ryan Mitchell/Titanium Ranger (credit only)
  - Ocean Blue (2000) ... Ryan Mitchell / Titanium Ranger (credit only)
  - The Great Egg Caper (2000) ... Ryan Mitchell / Titanium Ranger (credit only)
  - The Mighty Mega Battles (2000) ... Ryan Mitchell / Titanium Ranger (credit only)
  - In the Freeze Zone (2000) ... Ryan Mitchell / Titanium Ranger
  - As Time Runs Out (2000) ... Ryan Mitchell / Titanium Ranger
  - Yesterday Again (2000) ... Ryan Mitchell / Titanium Ranger (credit only)
  - The Chosen Path (2000) ... Ryan Mitchell / Titanium Ranger (credit only)
  - The Fifth Crystal (2000) ... Ryan Mitchell / Titanium Ranger (credit only)
  - The Omega Project (2000) ... Ryan Mitchell / Titanium Ranger (credit only)
  - The Queen's Return (2000) ... Ryan Mitchell / Titanium Ranger
  - A Face from the Past (2000) ... Ryan Mitchell / Titanium Ranger
  - Olympius Ascends (2000) ... Ryan Mitchell / Titanium Ranger
  - The Cobra Strikes (2000) ... Ryan Mitchell / Titanium Ranger
  - Strength of the Sun (2000) ... Ryan Mitchell / Titanium Ranger
  - Curse of the Cobra (2000) ... Ryan Mitchell / Titanium Ranger
  - Ryan's Destiny (2000) ... Ryan Mitchell / Titanium Ranger
  - Truth Discovered (2000) ... Ryan Mitchell / Titanium Ranger
  - From Deep in the Shadows (2000) ... Ryan Mitchell / Titanium Ranger
- "Parachute Express: Come Sing with Us" (1995)

=== Video games ===
- Power Rangers Lightspeed Rescue (2000) .... Titanium Ranger

=== Music Department ===
- Nightingale: A Melody of Life (2021)... (lyricist)/(playback singer)

=== As himself ===
- Power Rangers (2014) Seasons 8-12: Pure Titanium (video documentary short)
- That Hashtag Show (2014) (TV series)
  - The Power Rangers Lightspeed Rescue Cast Takes a Quiz on Their Season (2014)
  - Power Rangers Lightspeed Rescue Cast Interview (Power Morphicon 2014) (2014)
  - That Hashtag Show Goes to Power Morphicon 2014 (2014)
- SoCal Beat
  - Time Warner Cable (2014) .... singer of "Project Dirty"
- Call It a Show
  - Talk Show (2013) .... House Band

=== Archive footage ===
- Power Rangers Dino Thunder (TV series)
  - Ryan Mitchell / Titanium Ranger
- Legacy of Power (2004) – Ryan Mitchell / Titanium Ranger
