= Bumblebee (Lead song) =

Single by Lead

from the album Milestone
- B-side: "Shizuku (Sizk)" (CD, Type C); "Rosario (Rosary)" (CD, Type A & B)
- Released: April 25, 2018
- Recorded: 2018
- Genre: Pop; hip hop
- Label: Pony Canyon
- Composers: Drew Ryan Scott; Darren "Baby Dee Beats" Smith; Sean Alexander
- Lyricists: Akira Kagimoto; Shinya Tanuichi; (rap)

Lead singles chronology
"Beautiful Day" (2017)	"Bumblebee" (2018)	"Be the Naked" (2019)

"Bumblebee" is the twenty-ninth single by Japanese hip-hop group Lead. The single was announced in March and was released on April 25, 2018. The single was their third release post their studio album The Showcase, and released seven months after their previous single "Beautiful Day". The single peaked on the Oricon charts at No. 2, becoming their highest ranking single.

The single was released in four editions: a standard CD, two different CD+DVD editions, and a CD+booklet edition.

== Information ==
"Bumblebee" was released on April 25, 2018. It debuted at No. 5 on the Oricon Singles Charts and, by the second day, went up in ranking to No. 4. The single jumped again in rank to No. 2, where is stayed for the remainder of the week, giving the single the weekly ranking of No. 4 for its first week. The single was their first release in over six months, with their previous single being "Beautiful Day", released in August 2017. The single was officially announced via Pony Canyon's official YouTube for Lead on March 30, 2018, with the release of the music video.

The single was released in four editions: a standard CD, two CD+DVD editions with varying content and a version housing the CD and booklet. While the CD and CD+DVD editions house the b-side "Shizuku (Sizk)" (雫 / "Drop"), the CD and CD+Booklet editions contain the song "Rosario" (ロザリオ / "Rosary").

The lyrics to the title track were written by Lead members Shinya Tanuichi and Akira Yamaoka, with Shinya writing the rap portions. The music was written and composed by Drew Ryan Scott, Darren "Baby Dee Beats" Smith and Sean Alexander. The B-sides "Shizuku (Sizk)" and "Rosario (Rosary)" had their lyrics written by Makihashi Shungo (best known by his stage name shungo.). While songwriter Phantom worked on both songs, "Shizuku (Sizk)" was aided by Pius and 345. "Rosario (Rosary)" also had the help of Swedish songwriter Erik Lidbom and MUSOH.

== Background and composition ==
"Bumblebee" was written by Lead members Shinya Tanuichi and Akira Yamaoka, with Shinya writing the rap portions. The music was written and composed by Drew Ryan Scott, Darren "Baby Dee Beats" Smith and Sean Alexander. Drew Ryan Scott was the original singer-songwriter for the Los Angeles, California now-disbanded-based boy band After Romeo. Darren "Baby Dee Beats" Smith is most well known for his work with South Korean girl group Oh My Girl and group Shinee. Sean Alexander has also worked with South Korean groups, such as TVXQ, Twice and EXO.

The B-sides "Shizuku (Sizk)" and "Rosario (Rosary)" had their lyrics written by Makihashi Shungo (best known by his stage name shungo.), who has written songs for Japanese artist Hitomi Shimatani and Lead's original rival group W-inds. While songwriter Phantom worked on both songs, as well, "Shizuku (Sizk)" was aided by PIUS and 345. "Rosario (Rosary)" also had the help of Swedish songwriter Erik Lidbom, who has primarily worked in the K-pop genre, and MUSOH.

== Track listing ==
CD
No.	Title	Lyrics	Music	Length
1.	"Bumblebee"	Akira Kagimoto; Shinya Tanuichi; (rap)	Drew Ryan Scott; Darren "Baby Dee Beats" Smith; Sean Alexander	3:31
2.	"Shizuku (Sizk)" (雫 / Drop)	shungo.	Phantom; 345; Pius	3:48
3.	"Rosario (Rosary)" (ロザリオ)	Shungo.	Musoh; Phantom; Erik Lidbom	3:58

CD (Type A & B)
No.	Title	Lyrics	Music	Length
1.	"Bumblebee"	Akira Yamamoto; Shinya Tanuichi; (rap)	Drew Ryan Scott; Darren "Baby Dee Beats" Smith; Sean Alexander	3:31
2.	"Shizuku (Sizk)" (雫 / Drop)	shungo.	Phantom; 345; Pius	3:48

DVD (Type A)
No.	Title	Length
1.	"Bumblebee" (music video)	4:00
2.	"Bumblebee" (behind the music video)

DVD (Type B)
No.	Title	Length
1.	"Bumblebee" (special interview)
2.	"Bumblebee" (behind the photo-shooting)

CD+booklet
No.	Title	Lyrics	Music	Length
1.	"Bumblebee"	Akira Yamamoto; Shinya Tanuichi; (rap)	Drew Ryan Scott; Darren "Baby Dee Beats" Smith; Sean Alexander	3:31
2.	"Rosario (Rosary)"	shungo.	MUSOH; PHANTOM; Erik Lidbom	3:58

== Charts ==
Oricon Sales Chart (Japan)

Release	Chart	Peak position
April 25, 2018	Oricon Daily Chart	2
April 25, 2018	Oricon Weekly Chart	4
