= Tuxedo (Lead song) =

2020 song by Lead

Single by Lead

from the album Lead the Best, XTLIKE
- Released: September 23, 2020
- Recorded: 2020
- Genre: Pop; hip hop
- Label: Pony Canyon

Lead singles chronology
"Hide and Seek / Sunset Refrain" (2020)	"Tuxedo" (2020)	"Sonic Boom" (2021)

"Tuxedo" (タキシード) is the thirty-third single by the Japanese hip-hop group Lead. It was released on September 23, 2020, coinciding with member Shinya's 33rd birthday. It debuted at No. 5 on the Oricon chart, continuing their streak of top-ten singles, which began with "Hurricane" in 2011.

The single was released in four formats: a standard CD, two CD+DVD editions, and a CD+booklet edition.

Starting September 1, "Tuxedo" was used as the ending theme to the TBS show "Hiruobi!".

== Information ==
"Tuxedo" was their first single released after their ninth studio album Singularity, and first single in seven months. It debuted in the top five of the Oricon Singles Charts at No. 5. It took No. 4 for the week with a first week sales total of 9,585.

The single was released in four formats: a standard CD, two CD+DVD editions, and a CD+booklet edition. The CD contained the title track, along with the two coupling tracks "Kangoku Rock" and "Wild Fight". Both CD+DVD editions housed "Tuxedo" and "Kangoku Rokku", while the CD+Booklet contained "Tuxedo" and "Wild Fight". The Type A DVD carried the music video and making video of the title track. The Type B DVD carried their Lead Special Winter Live, which was performed on February 18, 2020 at Harevutai in Tokyo.

"Kangoku Rokku" is a cover of Elvis Presley's 1957 song "Jailhouse Rock". The modernized arrangement was performed by Kaz. This became the first time Lead had released a song completely performed in English since their debut in 2002.

For "Tuxedo", Lead once again worked with Kentaro Akutsu, who composed the dance track for the group. The music video was choreographed by Tomohiro Taniguchi of Da Pump, who had also done the choreography for their own summer hit "U.S.A." The lyrical portion was written by shungo., who had worked with the group before, including their more recent "Sunset Refrain." Lead's own rapper Shinya Taniuchi wrote the rap portion. shungo. also wrote the lyrics for the coupling track "Wild Fight". The latter was written and composed by Masat and American songwriter Rhett Fisher.

== Promotional activities ==
"Tuxedo" was utilized as the ending theme song to the TBS show "Hiruobi!" (ひるおび！) throughout the month of September 2020.

== Music videos ==
The music video for "Tuxedo" was heavily inspired by the fashion of the 1950s with Shinya, Keita and Akira donning tweed trousers and their hairstyles mimicking those most synonymous with the decade. Keita's hair styled in that of a long pompadour, similar to rock and roll icon's Elvis Presley. The set for the music video takes place in a diner, with various 1950s memorabilia and designs scattered throughout the background.

Throughout the video, the trio perform several dances that were popular during the time, including the jive, hand jive and the jitterbug. Other scenes include the group in front of a 1954 Buick Skylark, which was one of the more popular cars at the time.

The video was uploaded to Pony Canyon's official YouTube to aid the single's promotion.

On September 22, the music video for "Kangoku Rokku" premiered on YouTube. It was primarily a dance number with the members donning black and white-striped shirts to resemble the outfits and designs from Presley's 1957 song "Jailhouse Rock".

== Track listing ==
CD
No.	Title	Lyrics	Music	Composer(s)	Length
1.	"Tuxedo" (タキシード)	shungo. • Shinya Tanuichi (rap)	Kaz	Kentaro Akutsu	3:38
2.	"Kangoku Rokku" (監獄ロック / Jailhouse Rock)	Jerry Leiber and Mike Stoller	Kaz	Jerry Leiber and Mike Stoller	2:28
3.	"Wild Fight"	shungo.	Masat	Masat • Rhett Fisher	3:13
Total length:					9:23

CD: Type A & B
No.	Title	Lyrics	Music	Composer(s)	Length
1.	"Tuxedo" (タキシード)	shungo. • Shinya Tanuichi (rap)	Kaz	Kentaro Akutsu	3:38
2.	"Kangoku Rokku"	Jerry Leiber and Mike Stoller	Kaz	Jerry Leiber and Mike Stoller	2:28
Total length:					6:10

Type A: DVD
No.	Title	Director	Length
1.	"Tuxedo" (music video)	Tomohiro Taniguchi	3:39
2.	"Tuxedo" (behind the music video)

Type B: DVD
No.	Title	Length
1.	"Lead Winter Special Live (2020.02.18 ＠harevutai)" (Hide and Seek / Sunset Refrain / Gimme a call / Give Me Your Best Shot)	58:18
Total length:		58:18

CD+Booklet
No.	Title	Lyrics	Music	Composer(s)	Length
1.	"Tuxedo" (タキシード)	shungo. • Shinya Tanuichi (rap)	Kaz	Kentaro Akutsu	3:38
2.	"Wild Fight"	Shungo.	Masat	Masat • Rhett Fisher	3:13
Total length:					6:58

== Charts ==
Release	Chart	Peak position	Total sales
September 23, 2020	Oricon Daily Chart	5	
September 23, 2020	Oricon Weekly Chart	4	9,585 copies
September 23, 2020	Oricon Monthly Chart	26	9,585 copies
