= Beautiful Day (Lead song) =

Single by Lead

from the album Milestone
- B-side: "Shampoo Bubble" (Regular, Type A & B); "Say Good-Bye Say Hello" (Regular, Type C)
- Released: August 23, 2017
- Recorded: 2017
- Genre: J-pop, hip hop
- Label: Pony Canyon

Lead singles chronology
"Tokyo Fever" (2017)	"Beautiful Day" (2017)	"Bumblebee" (2018)

"Beautiful Day" is the twenty-eighth single by the Japanese hip-hop group Lead, released on August 23, 2017. It was their second single released after their studio album, The Showcase. It charted well on Oricon, taking the #6 spot for the week and remaining on the charts for four consecutive weeks.

The single was released on August 23, 2017, five months after their previous single "Tokyo Fever", which had been released in March of that year.

The music video for the title track was filmed in Hawaii.

== Information ==
"Beautiful Day" became Lead's tenth consecutive single to chart in the top ten on the Oricon Singles Chart, taking #6 for the week and remaining on the charts for four weeks. The single was released on August 23, 2017, five months after their previous single, "Tokyo Fever".

The single was released as a standard CD and three limited CD+DVD editions. The standard edition contained the title track and the two B-sides "Shampoo Bubble" and "Say Good-bye Say Hello." The type A and B limited editions carried the title track and B-side "Shampoo Bubble", while the limited type C edition held the title track and coupling track "Say Good-Bye Say Hello". The type A DVD carried the music video to "Beautiful Day", along with the video's making. The type B DVD held a video for "Shampoo Bubble" and a behind-the-scenes look at the filming. However, the video was not considered a music video; it was a trio in various places around the island of Hawaii. The type C DVD was a behind-the-scenes look at the making of the single's cover art and a video of the group spending a day on the island.

"Beautiful Day" was written and composed by Drew Ryan Scott and Sean Alexander. Sean and Drew would later go on to work with Lead again for their following song "Bumblebee". The lyrics to the coupling track "Shampoo Bubble" were written by Lead member Akira Kagimoto. The rap portion to the song was written by Japanese rapper KM-Markit, who had previously been under the Pony Canyon label in the mid-2000s before co-creating the record label Raider Music Record in 2010. The musical portion was written and performed by Chase Ryan, Beau Evans and Sean Alexander. For the coupling track "Say Good-Bye Say Hello", the lyrics were once again written by Akira; however, the rap portion was written by Lead's primary rapper Shinya Tanuichi. The music was written and composed by Matt Cab and RYUJA.

== Background and composition ==
"Beautiful Day" was written and composed by Drew Ryan Scott and Sean Alexander. Sean Alexander has worked with the likes of South Korean artists Kim Hyun-Joong, TVXQ and Girls' Generation. Sean would later go on to work with Lead again for their following song "Bumblebee." Drew Ryan Scott had previously worked with American artist Willow Smith and South Korean groups Shinee and Exo, and would also go on to work with Lead for their next single, along with Sean Alexander.

The lyrics to the coupling track "Shampoo Bubble" were written by Lead member Akira Kagimoto. The rap portion for the song was written by Japanese rapper KM-Markit, who had previously been under the Pony Canyon label in the mid-2000s before co-creating the record label Raider Music Record in 2010. The musical portion was written and performed by Chase Ryan, Beau Evans and Sean Alexander. For the coupling track "Say Good-Bye Say Hello", the lyrics were once again written by Akira; however, the rap portion was written by Lead's primary rapper Shinya Tanuichi. The music was written and composed by Matt Cab and RYUJA, the latter who has worked with the South Korean group BTS (known in Japan as "Bulletproof Boys").

== Track listing ==
CD
No.	Title	Lyrics	Music	Length
1.	"Beautiful Day"	Lead	Drew Ryan Scott • Sean Alexander	3:45
2.	"Shampoo Bubble"	Akira Kagimoto • KM-Markit (rap)	Chase Ryan • Beau Evans • Sean Alexander	3:18
3.	"Say Good-Bye Say Hello"	Akira Kagimoto • Shinya Tanuichi (rap)	Matt Cab • Ryuja	4:30

CD (Type A & B)
No.	Title	Lyrics	Music	Length
1.	"Beautiful Day"	Lead	Drew Ryan Scott • Sean Alexander	3:45
2.	"Shampoo Bubble"	Akira Kagimoto • KM-Markit (rap)	Chase Ryan • Beau Evans • Sean Alexander	3:18

DVD (Type A)
No.	Title	Length
1.	"Beautiful Day" (music video)	4:22
2.	"Beautiful Day" (behind the music video)

DVD (Type B)
No.	Title	Length
1.	"Shampoo Bubble" (Image Movie in Hawaii)	3:19
2.	"Shampoo Bubble" (Behind the Image Movie in Hawaii)	3:18

CD (Type C)
No.	Title	Lyrics	Music	Length
1.	"Beautiful Day"	Lead	Drew Ryan Scott • Sean Alexander	3:18
2.	"Say Good-Bye Say Hello"	Akira Kagimoto • Shinya Tanuichi (rap)	Matt Cab • Ryuja	4:30

DVD (Type C)
No.	Title	Length
1.	"Beautiful Day" (behind the photo shooting)
2.	"A Day in Hawaii"

== Charts ==
Oricon Sales Chart (Japan)

Release	Chart	Peak position
August 23, 2017	Oricon Weekly Chart	6
