= Vivid (KM-MARKIT album) =

Studio album by KM-MARKIT
- Released: April 20, 2005
- Recorded: 2004–2005
- Genre: R&B, Hip hop, rap
- Label: Pony Canyon; CD (PCCA-80033)
- Producer: KM-MARKIT, D-Originu, SUBZERO, Typewriter, YOSHI, C2K, CALVO

KM-MARKIT chronology
Vivid (2005)	Mark Out (2006)

Vivid (stylized as VIVID) is the debut studio album by Japanese hip-hop/rap artist Daisuke "KM-MARKIT" Kawai. The album failed to chart on Oricon, despite featuring an array of popular artists, including ZEEBRA, Koda Kumi, Miliyah Kato and UZI among others.

The album was only released as a CD; however, when placed into a DVD player, the viewer could access the only music video on the album: "Rainy Day", which featured R&B artist Koda Kumi.

== Information ==
Vivid (stylized as VIVID) is rapper KM-MARKIT's debut studio album released under the Pony Canyon label. Prior to releasing his solo album, in 1998 he was part of the Japanese hip-hop group Urbarian Gym (UBG), which was founded by famous rapper Zeebra. The album failed to chart on Oricon and Recochoku, despite being released during several other UBG artists' solo works.

The album was released only as a CD, never carrying a corresponding DVD. However, when placed into a DVD player, viewers could access the music video for "Rainy Day" (stylized as RAINY DAY), which featured singer-songwriter Koda Kumi. KM-MARKIT had collaborated with Kumi prior for her song "Hot Stuff," which was released a week prior to Vivid.

The album featured many members from UBG, the album ultimately being a collaborative effort between various members. "Intro" and "Mr.Urbarian" were produced by KM-MARKIT. Tracks "Sunshine" and "Rainy Day" were produced by SUBZERO. C2K produced the song "U.B. Party", Typewriter (タイプライター) produced "Snatch", CALVO produced "Inner City Blue" and YOSHI from BREDREN produced "Mirai e no Kagi ~The Key~". Producer D-Originu produced the remaining tracks.

Two artists outside of UBG were featured on the album. The aforementioned Koda Kumi and urban singer-songwriter Miliyah Kato. Miliyah Kato was featured on track No. 7, "Sunshine".

== Track listing ==
(Source)

CD
No.	Title	Lyrics	Music	Length
1.	"Intro"	KM-MARKIT	KM-MARKIT • ALG • Jr.	1:45
2.	"Mr.Urbarian" (Mr.アーバリアン)	KM-MARKIT	KM-MARKIT • ALG • Jr.	2:32
3.	"Dirty Talk"	KM-MARKIT • D-Originu	TAKE-C • D-Originu	3:52
4.	"Oudou" (王道 / Royal Road)	KM-MARKIT • D-Originu	TAKE-C • D-Originu	3:15
5.	"You're My..."	KM-MARKIT • D-Originu	TAKE-C	3:34
6.	"Do the Grind"	KM-MARKIT • D-Originu	TAKE-C • D-Originu	3:36
7.	"Sunshine feat. Miliyah Kato"	KM-MARKIT • Miliyah Kato	KM-MARKIT • SUBZERO • TAKE-C	4:13
8.	"Snatch feat. OJ FLOW & Typewriter"	KM-MARKIT • OJ FLOW • Typewriter	ALG • Typewriter	3:33
9.	"Mirai e no Kagi ~The Key~ feat. SPHERE of INFLUENCE" (未来への鍵 / Key to the Future)	AKEEM DA MANAGOO • KM-MARKIT • SPHERE of INFLUENCE • YOSHI	YOSHI • Jr. • TAKE-C	4:08
10.	"Tokai no Yaban Hitofito feat. ZEEBRA, UZI, OJ&ST" (都会の野蛮人 / City of Barbarians)	KM-MARKIT • UZI • ZEEBRA • OJ FLOW • SENTENCE • D-Originu	D-Originu • TAKE-C	2:58
11.	"U.B. Party"	KM-MARKIT • C2K	C2K • ALG	3:54
12.	"Memory Lane"	KM-MARKIT • D-Originu	D-Originu • ALG	4:15
13.	"Rainy Day feat. Koda Kumi"	KM-MARKIT • SUBZERO	SUBZERO • Yoshihisa Tokuda • Yuya Suzuki • Kaoru Akimoto	4:37
14.	"Inner City Blues"	KM-MARKIT • CALVO	CALVO • TAKE-C • ALG	3:42
15.	"Rainy Day feat. Koda Kumi" (Music Video) (Bonus Clip)		Ken Sueda (Video Director)	5:38
Total length:				55:32
