= Fumio Takashima =

Japanese entrepreneur (born 1956)

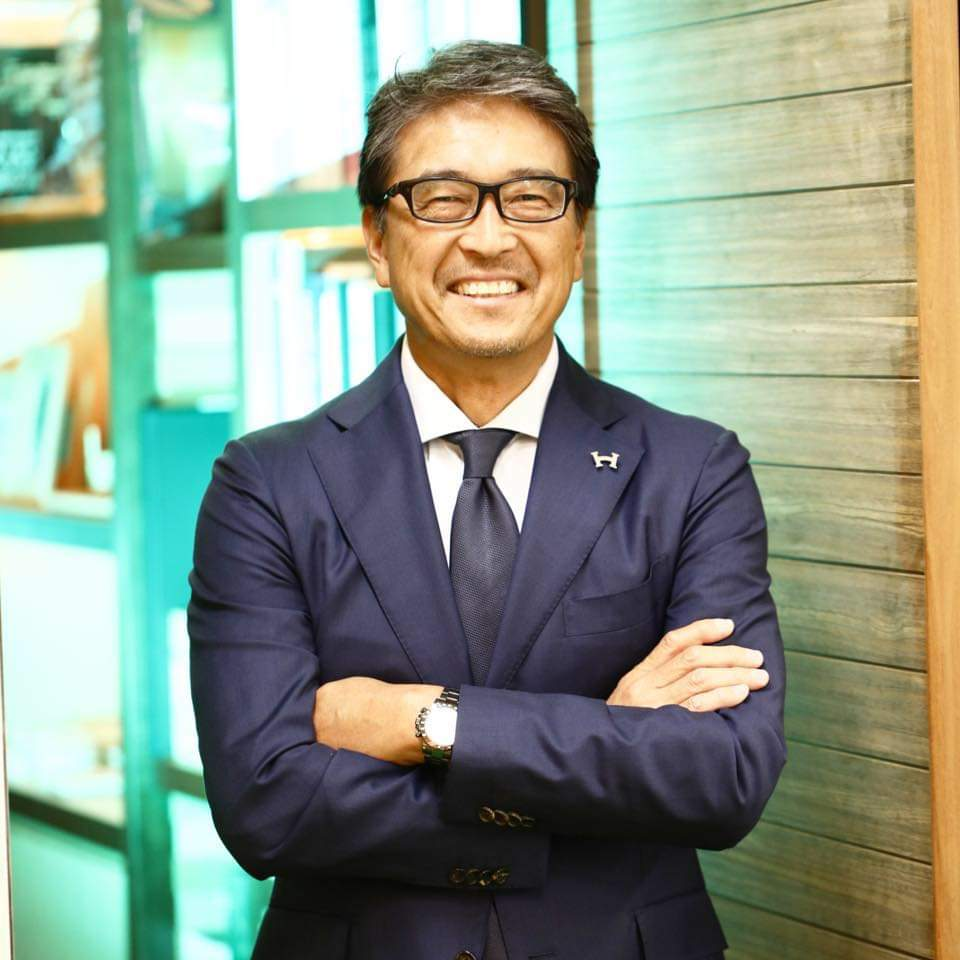
Fumio Takashima, Francfranc CEO.

Fumio Takashima (髙島 郁夫 Takashima Fumio born May 20, 1956) is a Japanese entrepreneur. He is the founder and CEO of Francfranc Corporation (previously named Bals Corporation).

== Early life ==
Fumio was born in Fukui Prefecture, Japan in 1956. He went to college and graduated from Kansai University.His mother was housewife and his father was working in the banking industry.His mother's parents were running a business and he remembers helping them when he was a kid. He spent his youth observing how businesses were run.

== Work and career ==
Fumio started his career as a furniture sales manager in Maruichi selling company (マルイチセーリング). He particularly devoted his time to understanding people needs.

In 1990, he established BALS Corporation in Tokyo.

In 1992, Francfranc brand name was born and the first shop opened in Higashi-Shinagawa, Tokyo. Fumio's vision was to bring colour, sense and fun into people lives.

In 2003, the first store outside Japan was opened (Hong Kong, Causeway bay).

In 2014 the brand closed its two stores in Singapore, in spite of previously announced plans to expand its presence. No reason was given.

In 2017, BALS is renamed Francfranc Corporation and hit a milestone and became a 25 years old brand.

In 2018, Fumio imagined a new brand called Masterrecipe. The concept? To use traditional craft technique to create modern design for furniture and decorative objects.

Up to this day, Fumio Takashima remains the CEO of Francfranc Corporation.

Financial times in 2006 said " Fumio Takashima may soon be Japan’s equivalent of the UK’s Sir Terence Conran ".

== Publications ==
- 2008: Thinking while managing Francfranc (original title: フランフランを経営しながら考えたこと―Francfrancからデザインビジネスの可能性を拡げるバルスの戦略).
- 2009: The unbreakable management (original title: ぶれない経営―ブランドを育てた8人のトップが語る – Collaborative work).
- 2010: No result without passion (original title: 遊ばない社員はいらない).
- Since 2010: Collaboration with Goethe lifestyle magazine

== Collaborations ==
2006: Fumio Takashima and Hervé Gambs (French designer) collaborated on artificial flowers collection and custom furniture for Bals Tokyo and Francfranc stores.

2014: Fumio and Tyler Brûlé collaboration between Francfranc and Monocle brand.

2015: Fumio and Nika Zupanc (Slovenian designer) collaborated for design furniture.

== Personal life ==
He likes contemporary art and often collaborates with magazines.

Work aside, he is a triathlete and enjoys surfing.

Sport

2013 : Ironman Triathlon Melbourne finisher.

Ironman 70.3 Triathlon: Auckland, San Diego, Nagoya, Singapore, Taiwan.

Ironman 51.5 Triathlon: participated in a lot of races
