= KM-Markit =

Daisuke Kawai だいすけ・かわい
- Also known as: KM-Markit
- Born: Daisuke Kawai
- Origin: Tokyo, Japan
- Genres: R&B, hip hop, rap
- Years active: 1998–present
- Labels: Pony Canyon, RAIDERMUZIK RECORDS
- Website: Official Ameblo

Daisuke Kawai (川合大介 / だいすけ・かわい, December 16, 1976, in Tokyo), is a Japanese singer, better known by his stage name KM-Markit (stylized as KM-MARKIT).

In 1998, he was initially part of the Urbarian Gym (URBARIAN GYM / UBG), a Japanese hip-hop group, which also featured popular Japanese rapper Zeebra beginning in 1997. He went on to sign with the Pony Canyon label in 2004, releasing his first album, Vivid, in April the following year. He released one more album under label before parting ways to do his own projects.

UBG later disbanded in 2010.

After UBG's disbandment, in 2010, he co-founded the Raider Music Record and helped create the underground hip-hop group The Raiders, becoming the executive producer. The group released one album, The Raiders, along with several singles. KM-Markit also collaborated with other artists, though they were under different labels.

== Biography ==
Daisuke "KM-MARKIT" Kawai was born in Tokyo, Japan on December 16, 1976. In 1998, he joined the Urbarian Gym, a hip-hop group who was created by Japanese rapper ZEEBRA in 1997. Daisuke departed from the group to begin his solo projects under the Pony Canyon label in 2005, with his debut album Vivid (stylized as VIVID). The album featured Koda Kumi(倖田來未), who was one of Japan's more popular artist at the time (alongside Namie Amuro and Ayumi Hamasaki). This was despite Kumi being under the Avex sub-label Rhythm Zone at the time.

He released his second studio album, Mark Out (stylized as MARK OUT), a year later on May 12, 2006. Unlike Vivid, Mark Out charted only at No. 97 on the Oricon charts. It remained on the charts for two weeks. The album featured famed singer-songwriter Miliyah Kato.

Urbarian Gym disbanded thirteen years after their debut on March 24, 2010.

In 2010, after UBG's disbandment, KM-MARKIT co-founded the label RAIDERMUZIK RECORDS, and joined the underground hip-hop group The Raiders, coming on as the executive producer. Other members included MINESIN, D-ON, HAR-CO, 8, HI-D, YUKALI, MICHO, KOHH(千葉雄喜), TY-KOH, TAKESHI & SATOSHI and Mr. LOW-D. Their first single, Oh Baby (stylized as OH BABY), featured KM-MARKIT, YUKALI and 8. They released their first album, The Raiders, the following year.

The Raiders went on to release a few singles following their debut album: Get It On (stylized as GET IT ON), B.M.N. (Big Monster Nuts) and Shut a Fu%k Up!!!.

KM-MARKIT released a few solo works post The Raiders album under the RAIDERMUZIK RECORDS label.

These included Next Episode featuring NaNa in 2010, and Magnetic featuring miray in late 2014.

Outside of The Raiders, KM-MARKIT worked behind-the-scenes with various artists as a lyricist and composer. He wrote the lyrics for the Japanese translations of the songs "Blood Sweat & Tears", "DNA", "Not Today" and "MIC Drop" from the 2018 BTS album Face Yourself, along with writing the lyrics to the albums' original songs "Go Go" and "Crystal Snow". He also worked with Japanese hip-hop group Lead for the songs "Shampoo Bubble" (2017), in which he wrote the rap, and "Drop in the box" (2019), in which both he and RYUJA composed the instrumental.

On April 19, 2020, KM-MARKIT took part in the song "Be One ~Bokura ni Dekiru Koto~" (僕らにできる事 / What We Can Do), along with various other Japanese artists, including KEITA, Koda Kumi, Micro and Kenji03 among others. The song was brought about to encourage citizens to stay home due to the COVID-19 pandemic.

== Uncharted singles ==
=== Magnetic (along with miray) ===
Magnetic (stylized as MAGNETIC) is the third solo single by rapper KM-MARKIT. It featured R&B/dancehall/reggae artist miray. miray had previously worked with KM-MARKIT on her self-titled album, miray, in mid-2010.

The single failed to chart on Oricon and Recochoku.

Information
Magnetic is the third solo single by KM-MARKIT and features reggae artist miray. The single was digitally released on November 19, 2014.

The song was released on iTunes Japan as a digital single. miray was initially under the Avex sub-label Rhythm Zone. On August 4, 2010 (four years prior to the single), she had featured KM-MARKIT on her album miray in the song "Box Seat" (stylized as BOX SEAT). However, upon the release of Magnetic, she was no longer under the Rhythm Zone sub-label and chose to focus on independent work. This independent work led her to the indie record label Raider Music Record, which was co-founded by KM-MARKIT himself.

Despite being a single, "Magnetic" did not receive a music video and was released solely as audio unlike his previous singles, Give a Little... and Next Episode feat. NaNa.

The song was classified as electronica/rap due to the synthesizer used predominately throughout the song.

Track List
Digital Single

1. "Magnetic feat. miray" – 3:57
  Arranger: KM-MARKIT • KEMUMAKI
  Lyrics: KM-MARKIT • miray

== Albums ==
=== Studio albums ===
1. "VIVID"
  April 20, 2005
2. "MARK OUT"
  Rank: No. 97
  December 6, 2006

=== The Raiders albums ===
1. "THE RAIDERS"
  August 24, 2011

== Singles ==
=== Solo singles ===
1. "Give a Little... (with SPHERE & 杏-ann-)"
  August 25, 2010
2. "NEXT EPISODE feat. NaNa"
  November 24, 2010
3. "MAGNETIC (along with miray)"
  November 19, 2014

=== The Raiders singles ===
1. "OH BABY"
  July 6, 2011
2. "SUGAR/Higher"
  July 27, 2011
3. "B.M.N. -Big Monster Nuts-"
  June 27, 2012
4. "Shut a Fu%k Up!!!"
  July 25, 2012
5. "GET IT ON"
  August 29, 2012

== Songs as featured artist ==
1. "Taidou" (胎動 / Quickening) (December 25, 1998)
  from album Doytenna 2000 / LIBRO with Ark, KEMUMAKI & DOBINSKI
2. "MAD MAXX" (February 19, 2000)
  from album THE SHOW CASE (THREE THE HARD WAY) / Low IQ 01 x Zeebra x UBG
3. "BEAT BOXING feat. KM-MARKIT" (June 14, 2000)
  from album ZEEBRA 「BASED ON A TRUE STORY」 / ZEEBRA
4. "Usohappyaku feat. MICADELIC, INDEMORAL, KM-MARKIT, MINESIN, BACKGAMMON & DOBINSKI" (嘘八百 / Full of Lies) (December 20, 2000)
  from album 三善的大魔境 / Miyoshi/Zenzou
5. "ONEWAY" (November 20, 2001)
  from album N / UBG
6. "URBAN BARBARLIAN GUERRILLA (UBG)" (June 19, 2002)
  from album GUERRILLA GROWING PLATINUM / UBG
7. "CHANGE THE GAME" (December 18, 2002)
  from album Change The Game / Various Artists
8. "G.Y.M feat. OJ & ST, KM-MARKIT, BRZ" (May 8, 2003)
  from album NEW DEAL PRESENTS SHOW and PROVE / Various Artists
9. "Stop the Violence feat. ZEEBRA, UZI, OJ & ST, KM-MARKIT" (September 26, 2003)
  from album UNITED NATIONS III / DJ Yutaka
10. "THE TRAINING DAY feat. ZEEBRA, UZI, OJ & ST, KM-MARKIT & CHINO" (January 21, 2005)
  from the album DADDY'S HOUSE VOL.3 / DJ MASTERKEY
11. "Hot Stuff feat. KM-MARKIT" (April 13, 2005)
  from album secret / Koda Kumi
12. "unreliable feat. KM-MARKIT [remixed by FIRSTKLAS]" (May 21, 2005)
  from album LOVE IS THE MESSAGE / Various Artists
13. "IT'S ALL A G[@]ME feat. GOTZ, CHINO, SUMI & KM-MARKIT [UBG REMIX]" (June 1, 2005)
  from album Street Dreams / ZEEBRA
14. "MUSIC TRIBE feat. Q & KM-MARKIT" (January 11, 2006)
  from album DRAMA / Full of Harmony
15. "Taste of Honey feat. CO-KEY & KM-MARKIT" (February 15, 2006)
  from album The New Beginning / ZEEBRA
16. "Club Happiness ~Brothahood Version feat. KM-MARKIT~" (March 1, 2006)
  from album For Real? / Toshinobu Kubota
17. "BOX SEAT feat. KM-MARKIT" (August 4, 2010)
  from album miray / miray

== Collaborative works ==
<w-inds>

- FLY HIGH (February 22, 2012)
  "Fly High" (lyrics), "Put your hands up!!!" (lyrics)
- MOVE LIKE THIS (July 4, 2012)
  "Superstar" (lyrics), "SAY YES" (lyrics)

<KEITA>

- SIDE BY SIDE (June 5, 2013)
  "Magic feat. AKLO" (lyrics), "Turn it up" (lyrics), "Hey Love" (lyrics), "One More Time" (lyrics)

<Show Luo>

- Fantasy (February 12, 2014)
  "Fantasy" (lyrics)

<BTS>

- Wake Up (December 24, 2014)
  "No More Dream" (lyrics), "Shingeki no Boudan" (lyrics), "Ii ne" (lyrics), "Boy in Luv" (lyrics), "N.O" (lyrics), "Just One Day" (lyrics), "Danger" (lyrics), "Miss Right" (lyrics), "The Stars" (lyrics), "Jump" (lyrics), "Ii ne! Pt. 2 ~Ano Basho De~" (lyrics), "Wake Up" (lyrics)
- For You (June 17, 2015)
  "For You" (lyrics), "War of Hormone" (lyrics), "Let Me Know" (lyrics)
- "I Need U" (December 8, 2015)
  "I Need You" (lyrics), "Dope ~Chou Yabe!~" (lyrics), "Boyz with Fun" (lyrics)
- Youth (September 7, 2016)
  "Run" (lyrics), "Butterfly" (lyrics), "Good Day" (rap lyrics), "Fire" (lyrics), "Save Me" (lyrics), "Baepsae" (lyrics), "Wishing on a star" (lyrics), "Epilogue: Young Forever" (lyrics)
- Face Yourself (April 4, 2018)
  "Blood Sweat & Tears" (lyrics), "DNA" (lyrics), "Not Today" (lyrics), "MIC Drop" (lyrics), "Go Go" (lyrics), "Crystal Snow" (lyrics), "Best of Me" (lyrics), "Spring Day" (lyrics)
- Fake Love/Airplane pt.2 (November 7, 2018)
  "Fake Love" (lyrics), "Airplane pt.2" (lyrics)

<SWAY>

- UNCHAINED (August 28, 2018)
  "Naked" (lyrics, co-writer)

<Lead>

- MILESTONE (July 18, 2018)
  "Shampoo Bubble" (rap lyrics)
- Be the Naked (January 30, 2019)
  "Drop in the box" (lyrics, composer)
- XTLIKE (September 4, 2024)
  "There for You" (lyrics, composer)

<Samuel>

- Sixteen (February 7, 2018)
  "Sixteen" (lyrics)
- Candy (May 16, 2018)
  "Candy" (lyrics)
