= Reprise (EP) =

EP by Lead
- Released: September 24, 2025
- Recorded: 2025
- Genre: Hip hop, pop, R&B, dance, new jack swing
- Label: Pony Canyon

Lead chronology
XTLIKE (2024)	Reprise (2025)

Singles from Reprise
- 1. "Roller Coaster" Released: September 10, 2025

Reprise (stylized as REPRISE) is the first EP released by the Japanese hip hop group Lead, released on September 24, 2025. The EP debuted at No. 17 on the Oricon Albums Charts.

The EP consisted of six tracks, the main promotional track being "Roller Coaster."

Reprise was released in two editions; a CD only version and a CD+Photobook edition.

== Information ==
Reprise is the first extended play by Lead and was released a year after their studio album XTLIKE. It peaked at No. 17 on the Oricon Weekly Charts, and remained on the charts for four consecutive weeks. The album's overall theme was "return to the origin."

The album was released in two editions: a standard CD only and a CD+Photobook edition that contained a twenty-page booklet. The album's cover contains various works and promotional posters Lead had released during their debut, including personal items owned by both the members and Pony Canyon's staff.

Reprise's sub-heading is "Life On Da Beat," in reference to their debut album of the same name. In an interview with BARKS, Shinya Taniuchi commented that they wanted to perform a tour of their first album, while including new songs that worked with their original sound. In the same interview, Akira Kagimoto stated, "...this was a concept, so we narrowed it down to the theme of the music we were listening to. . .such as New Jack Swing and Two-Step...".

== Background and composition ==
Musical composer Yasushi Sasamoto returned to work on the album. He had previously worked with Lead on their debut album "Life On Da Beat," (2003) writing and composing each track, including their debut single "Manatsu no Magic." He returned to work with Lead again for the tracks "The Love is Perfect" and "Will," which he had written and composed, while Lead member Shinya Taniuchi assisted with the lyrics. Nachiko (best known by his stage name "7chi子♪") also returned to work with the group, writing the lyrics for the track "Fly Blind," while Lead member Akira Kagimoto wrote and composed the music. 7chi子♪ had previously worked with Lead for their albums Now or Never (2012) and The Showcase (2016).

The main promotional track, "Roller Coaster", was written by leader Shinya Taniuchi. The track was composed by DECAF, CHAD, Largo and BAEUM. The track was uploaded to the group's official YouTube on September 9, 2025, two weeks prior to the album's release. "All I Got is This Path" was written and composed by Andy Love and Alawn. Alawn is best known for their works with various K-Pop artists, including NCT, ITZY and Stray Kids. Members Shinya and Akira wrote the lyrical portion of the track.

For the final track, aptly titled "Curtain Call", Lead worked with Saeki Yusuke and nishi-ken, both who had worked with Lead throughout their career on various projects. Most recently, Saeki Yusuke worked on their track "Don't Stay" and nishi-ken worked on "Jack in the Beats" from their most-recent album XTLIKE.

== Promotional activities ==
To help promote the album, Lead held special release events beginning September 13, 2025. They performed at several venues prior to and after the EP's release.

On September 10, they released the main track for the album, "Roller Coaster", as a digital single. The song was written by member and leader Shinya Taniuchi. When asked what was the meaning of the song, Shinya said, "Traveling the past and the future at the same time on a time machine." The overall theme of the single was to carry the sound of their debut music while blending their new sound.

== Track listing ==
CD
No.	Title	Lyrics	Music	Arranger(s)	Length
1.	"The love is perfect"	Yasushi Sasamoto • Shinya Taniuchi	Yasushi Sasamoto	Yasushi Sasamoto	3:20
2.	"Will"	Hisatake Kumagai • Yasushi Sasamoto • Shinya Taniuchi	Hisatake Kumagai • Yasushi Sasamoto • Shinya Taniuchi	Hisatake Kumagai • Yasushi Sasamoto • Shinya Taniuchi	3:03
3.	"Fly Blind"	7chi子♪	Akira Kagimoto	Akira Kagimoto	3:26
4.	"Roller Coaster"	Shinya Taniuchi	DECAF • CHAD • Largo • BAEUM	DECAF • CHAD • Largo • BAEUM	2:55
5.	"All I got is this path"	Akira Kagimoto • Shinya Taniuchi	Andy Love • Alawn	Andy Love • Alawn	3:09
6.	"Curtain call"	Saeki youthK • Shinya Taniuchi	Akira Kagimoto	nishi-ken	3:51
Total length:					19:44

== Special release events ==
Reprise launch events

1. September 3, 2025: Pony Canyon 3rd Floor Even Space Tokyo
2. September 14, 2025: LaLaport Shin-Misato Main Building 1F Sky Garden Stage Saitama
3. September 15, 2025: Tower Records Shibuya
4. September 23, 2025: Shiodome Shiodome Underground Walkway Tokyo
5. September 27, 2025: Aeon Lake Town Kaze Saitama
6. September 28, 2025: Ariake Garden Minna no Terrace Tokyo
7. October 5, 2025: Yodobashi Camera Multimedia Umeda Store B2 Yodobashi Hall Osaka

== Charts ==
Oricon chart performance for Reprise
Release	Chart	Peak position
September 24, 2025	Oricon Weekly Albums Chart	17
