= Sonic Boom (song) =

2021 song by Lead

Single by Lead

from the album Lead the Best, XTLIKE
- Released: August 25, 2021
- Recorded: 2021
- Genre: Pop; hip hop
- Label: Pony Canyon

Lead singles chronology
"Tuxedo" (2020)	"Sonic Boom" (2021)	"See Your Heart" (2023)

"Sonic Boom" is the thirty-fourth single by the Japanese hip-hop group Lead. It was released on August 25, 2021, nearly a year after their previous single "Tuxedo".

It debuted at No. 10 on the Oricon Singles Chart.

The single was released in four formats: a standard CD, two CD+DVD editions, and a CD+booklet edition.

== Information ==
"Sonic Boom" was Lead's first single of 2021. It debuted at No. 10 on the Oricon Singles Chart.

The single was released in four formats: a standard CD, two CD+DVD editions, and a CD+booklet edition. The CD contains the title track, along with the two coupling tracks "Get Over" and "Te Quiero Mucho". Both CD+DVD editions house "Sonic Boom" and "Get Over", while the CD+Booklet carries "Sonic Boom" and "Te Quiero Mucho". The Type A DVD houses the music video and making video of the cover art. The Type B DVD has excerpts from their Lead Special Winter Live, which was performed on February 18, 2020 at Harevutai in Tokyo.

The track "Sonic Boom" was written and composed by Lead's Akira Kagimoto. Both he and lead rapper Shinya Taniuchi wrote the lyrical portion. The coupling track "Get Over" was written and composed by HIKARI and Swedish songwriter Erik Lidbom, while Lead's own Keita Furuya wrote the lyrics. The other coupling track, "Te Quiero Mucho", was composed by Oliver Fernstrom and Viktor Strand. The lyrics were written by Japanese lyricist Mayu Wakisaka, with the rap portion written by Shinya.

== Music video ==
Prior to the music video's release, an announcement was made recruiting a marching band to appear in the video. Kaetsu Ariake Junior and Senior High School Marching Band ESTEAM (est. 1993), Baton Twirling Club, and Dance Club were chosen to perform in the video.

== Track listing ==
CD
No.	Title	Lyrics	Music	Composer(s)	Length
1.	"Sonic Boom"	Akira Kagimoto • Shinya Taniuchi (rap)	Akira Kagimoto • Nobuhiro Denda	Akira Kagimoto	3:55
2.	"Get Over"	Keita Furuya	HIKARI	Erik Lidbom • Hikari	3:57
3.	"Te Quiero Mucho"	Mayu Wakisaka • Shinya Taniuchi (rap)	Oliver Fernstrom • Viktor Strand • Mahoney	Oliver Fernstrom • Viktor Strand	3:10
Total length:					11:02

CD: Type A & B
No.	Title	Lyrics	Music	Composer(s)	Length
1.	"Sonic Boom"	Akira Kagimoto • Shinya Taniuchi (rap)	Akira Kagimoto • Nobuhiro Denda	Akira Kagimoto	3:55
2.	"Get Over"	Keita Furuya	Hikari	Erik Lidbom • Hikari	3:57
Total length:					7:52

Type A: DVD
No.	Title	Length
1.	"Sonic Boom" (Special Version) (Music Video)	3:57
2.	"Sonic Boom" (Behind the Jacket Shooting)	20:49
Total length:		24:46

Type B: DVD
No.	Title	Length
1.	"Lead Winter Special Live (2020.02.18 ＠harevutai)" (R.O.O.T.S / Be the Naked / Night Deluxe / Summer Vacation)

CD+Booklet
No.	Title	Lyrics	Music	Composer(s)	Length
1.	"Sonic Boom"	Akira Kagimoto • Shinya Taniuchi (rap)	Akira Kagimoto • Nobuhiro Denda	Akira Kagimoto	3:55
2.	"Te Quiero Mucho"	Mayu Wakisaka • Shinya Taniuchi (rap)	Oliver Fernstrom • Viktor Strand • Mahoney	Oliver Fernstrom • Viktor Strand	3:10
Total length:					7:07

== Charts ==
Release	Chart	Peak position	Total sales
August 25, 2021	Oricon Daily Chart	10	
August 25, 2021	Oricon Weekly Chart	12	6,716
August 25, 2021	Oricon Monthly Chart	35	6,716
