= Mark Out =

Studio album by KM-MARKIT
- Released: 6 December 2006
- Recorded: 2006
- Genre: R&B, Hip hop, rap
- Length: 49:25
- Label: Pony Canyon; CD (PCCA-2365)
- Producer: KM-MARKIT

KM-MARKIT chronology
Vivid (2005)	Mark Out (2006)	The Raiders (2011)

Mark Out (stylized as MARK OUT) is Japanese rapper KM-MARKIT's second studio album. Unlike his debut album, which failed to chart, Mark Out charted at No. 97 on the Oricon charts.

The album was released in CD only format. However, the song "Bakaya ROW" was given a music video to assist in promotions.

== Information ==
Mark Out is Japanese rapper KM-MARKIT's second studio album under the Pony Canyon label. The album performed better than his previous album, Vivid, charting at No. 97 on the Oricon Albums Charts, and remaining on the charts for two consecutive weeks.

The album was released as a standard CD, never carrying a corresponding DVD. Despite this, the song "Bakaya Row" (バカヤROW) was given an accompanying music video.

Along with featuring many rappers from UBG, including Zeebra, JAMOSA and SPHERE, the album featured Verbal from the hip-hop duo m-flo, and singer-songwriter Miliyah Kato. VERBAL was featured in the song "Bakaya ROW" (track #4), and Miliyah Kato was featured in the song "Me & My..." (track #9). Miliyah Kato had previously been featured on KM-MARKIT's previous album for the song "Sunshine". The majority of the songs were recorded and mixed by TAKE-C for T.O.P. While TAKE-C mixed every song on the album, the songs "Chillin'", "Lights Out" and "My Love" were recorded by ALG. "HOT" and "Movin' Again" were recorded by Doc-Dee at Nakameguro Studio.

"Bakayarou" in Japanese is typically said to be a more vulgar version of "baka" (バカ / idiot). By the suffix "yarou" (やろう) being added, the term roughly translates to "dumb ass". The album also featured singer-songwriter Miliyah Kato on track No. 9, "Me & My...".

The album was later available for download on the popular media player iTunes.

== Reception ==
The album garnered positive reviews upon its release.

Greg at Selective Hearing said the album was "strong", with their favorite tracks being the collaborative efforts. They also praised the solo tracks Get Low and Lights Out.

== Track listing ==
(Source)

CD
No.	Title	Lyrics	Music	Producer(s)	Length
1.	"Intro ～2nd Time～"	KM-MARKIT	TAKE-C	DJ ARTS a.k.a ALL BACK	0:54
2.	"Get Low"	KM-MARKIT	TAKE-C	UTA	3:08
3.	"Mermaid feat. Full of Harmony"	KM-MARKIT • Full of Harmony • GP	TAKE-C	GP a.k.a GREEN PEEACE	3:27
4.	"Bakaya ROW feat. VERBAL (m-flo)" (バカヤROW / Dumb Ass)	KM-MARKIT • VERBAL • GP	TAKE-C • Yukali	UTA	4:36
5.	"Chillin'"	KM-MARKIT • Usk Trak	ALG • TAKE-C	Usk Trak	4:07
6.	"Bounce"	KM-MARKIT • KNOCK	TAKE-C	KNOCK	3:13
7.	"Bang! feat. SIMON & 4WD"	KM-MARKIT • SIMON • 4WD • Hirose Technical	TAKE-C	Hirose Technical	5:38
8.	"Miraiyosozu ～The Blueprint～ feat. ZEEBRA" (未来予想図 / View of the Future)	KM-MARKIT • Zeebra • UTA	TAKE-C	UTA	4:20
9.	"Me & My... feat. Miliyah Kato"	KM-MARKIT • Miliyah Kato • UTA	TAKE-C	UTA	3:58
10.	"Lights Out"	KM-MARKIT • Fire House	Miya_Bigsmile • ALG • TAKE-C	Fire House	4:08
11.	"HOT feat. SPHERE of INFLUENCE & JAMOSA"	KM-MARKIT • SPHERE of INFLUENCE • JAMOSA • Typewriter	Doc-Dee • TAKE-C	Typewriter	4:05
12.	"Movin' Again"	KM-MARKIT • D-Originu	Doc-Dee • TAKE-C	D-Originu	3:35
13.	"My Love"	KM-MARKIT • DJ ARTS	R-CROWN • ALG • TAKE-C	DJ ARTS a.k.a ALL BACK	4:16
Total length:					49:25

== Charts ==
Oricon Sales Chart (Japan)

Release	Chart	Peak position
6 December 2006	Oricon Weekly Charts	97
