= XTLIKE =

Studio album by Lead
- Released: September 4, 2024
- Recorded: 2023–2024
- Genre: Hip hop, pop, R&B, dance
- Label: Pony Canyon

Lead chronology
Lead the Best (2022)	XTLIKE (2024)	Reprise (2025)

Singles from XTLIKE
- 1. "See Your Heart" Released: May 24, 2023; 2. "Billionaire" Released: October 6, 2023; 3. "Jack in the Beats" Released: February 25, 2024; 4. "Don't Stay" Released: June 5, 2024

XTLIKE (pronounced "ekstrike") is the tenth studio album released by the Japanese hip hop group Lead, released on September 4, 2024, four years after their previous studio album, Singularity. The album debuted at No. 9 on the Oricon Albums Charts.

The album included their physical single "See Your Heart", along with their digital singles "Billionaire", "Jack in the Beats" and "Don't Stay".

XTLIKE was released in two editions; a CD only version and a CD+DVD edition. A limited CD+Blu-ray+Photo Book edition was released to their fan club, which contained a thirty-six page booklet.

== Information ==
XTLIKE is the tenth studio album released by the Japanese hip-hop group Lead, released two years after their previous album, Lead the Best. The album debuted at in the top ten on the Oricon charts, taking the No. 9 position, and peaked at No. 6. The album charted No. 12 at the end of the first week, with first week sales of 6,992.

The album was released in three separate editions: a standard CD housing fourteen musical tracks, a standard CD+DVD edition housing the fourteen musical tracks and music videos for select singles, and a limited CD+Blu-ray+Photo Book edition, which contained a thirty-six page booklet. The songs "Sonic Boom" and "Tuxedo" were placed on the album. Both songs had previously been placed on their compilation album Lead the Best, while the music videos had been omitted.

== Promotional activities ==
Prior to the album's release, the group released four singles: See Your Heart, Billionaire, Jack in the Beats and Don't Stay.

"See Your Heart" was released on May 24, 2023, and charted No. 5 on the Oricon Singles Charts. The song was used as the ending theme for the Fuji TV series Nariyuki Kaidou Tabi (なりゆき街道旅 / Nariyuki Highway Journey) in the month of April. On May 14, 2023, Lead performed "See Your Heart" at the Sayonara Nakano Sunplaza Music Festival.

"Billionaire" was Lead's first digital single, released on October 6, 2023. The song was advertised as the "sequel" to their 2004 song "Night Deluxe." The day of its release, the group held a campaign to promote the song, offering prizes to those who streamed the song the most on Line Music. It was also utilized as the opening number to their Lead Upturn 2023 ~Jack in the Beats~.

To coincide with their 2023/2024 tour, Lead released the tie-in song "Jack in the Beats" on February 25, 2024. The song was debuted during their Lead Upturn 2023 ~Jack in the Beats~ lives.

"Don't Stay" was released on June 5, 2024, with a promotional music video released the same day on Lead's official YouTube. It was utilized as the ending theme to the Netflix movie Baki Hanma VS Kengan Ashura.

== Track listing ==
CD
No.	Title	Lyrics	Music	Arranger(s)	Length
1.	"Ignite"		nishi-ken	Akira Kagimoto	1:39
2.	"My Solution"	Saeki youthK	T-SK • Hide Kawada	T-SK • Didrik Thott	3:48
3.	"Billionaire"	Shōko Fujibayashi • Shinya Taniuchi (rap)	Shōko Fujibayashi	Stefan Ekstedt • Didrik Thott • Samuel Waermö	3:01
4.	"Romance no 110-ban" (ロマンスの110番 / Romance 110)	Akira Kagimoto	Mats Tarnfors	Christofer Erixon • Mats Tarnfors	3:10
5.	"Sonic Boom"	Akira Kagimoto • Shinya Taniuchi (rap)	Akira Kagimoto • Nobuhiro Denda	Akira Kagimoto	3:55
6.	"Free Your..."	Amon Hayashi	C.ON	C.ON • Amon Hayashi	3:03
7.	"Don't Stay"	Keita Furuya • Saeki youthK • Shinya Taniuchi (rap)	eba (F.M.F)	Akira Kagimoto	3:54
8.	"There for You"	KM-MARKIT • Masaya Wada	AILI	KM-MARKIT • Masaya Wada • AILI	3:42
9.	"Life"	Keita Furuya	Sebastian Thott • Yuki Tsujimura	Sebastian Thott	2:56
10.	"See Your Heart"	SQVARE • shungo.	Masa Takumi	Masa Takumi	3:23
11.	"Love Survival" (ラブサバイバル)	Lead	Josef Melin • Christofer Erixon	KAZ	3:22
12.	"Tuxedo"	shungo. • Shinya Taniuchi (rap)	KAZ	Kentaro Akutsu	3:38
13.	"Jack in the Beats"	7chi子 (Nachiko) • Shinya Taniuchi (rap)	nishi-ken	Akira Kagimoto	4:10
14.	"Gravity"	Akira Kagimoto • Shinya Taniuchi	Keita Tachibana • JUNE	Keita Tachibana	4:12
Total length:					47:53

DVD
No.	Title	Director(s)	Length
1.	"Tuxedo" (Music Video)	Tomohiro Taniguchi	3:40
2.	"Sonic Boom" (Music Video)		3:57
3.	"See Your Heart" (Music Video)		3:27
4.	"Don't Stay" (Music Video)	Tada Takuya	3:55
5.	"Don't Stay" (Performance Video)	Tada Takuya	3:53
6.	"Don't Stay" (Behind the Scenes)	Minoru Kieda	4:31

== Charts ==
Chart performance for XTLIKE
Chart (2024)	Peak position
Japanese Albums (Oricon)	12
Japanese Hot Albums (Billboard Japan)	13

Sales chart performance for singles from XTLIKE
Date	Title	Peak position	Sales
September 23, 2020	"Tuxedo"	5	9,585
August 25, 2021	"Sonic Boom"	10	6,716
May 24, 2023	"See Your Heart"	10	5,815
