= See Your Heart =

Single by Lead

from the album XTLIKE
- Released: May 24, 2023
- Recorded: 2023
- Genre: Pop; hip hop
- Label: Pony Canyon

Lead singles chronology
"Sonic Boom" (2021)	"See Your Heart" (2023)

"See Your Heart" is the thirty-fifth single by the Japanese hip-hop group Lead. It was released on May 24, 2023, nearly two years after their previous single Sonic Boom.

"See Your Heart" debuted at No. 5 on the Oricon charts.

The single was released in four formats: a standard CD, two limited CD+DVD editions, and a limited CD+booklet edition.

== Information ==
"See Your Heart" is the thirty-fifth single released by Lead on May 24, 2023. It is their first single of 2023.

The single peaked at No. 5 on the Oricon Singles Charts.

The single was released in four formats: a standard CD, two CD+DVD editions, and a CD+booklet edition. The CD contains the title track, along with the two coupling tracks "My Beast" and "Higher Love". Both CD+DVD editions house "See Your Heart" and "My Beast", while the CD+Booklet carries "See Your Heart" and "Higher Love". The Type A DVD houses the music video and its corresponding making video. The Type B DVD contains member versions of the music video, in which the camera focuses on each individual member.

The track "See Your Heart" was written and composed by Masanori Takumi, who had previously won the 65th Grammy Award for "Best Global Music Album" for his 2022 album Sakura. Lead member Akira Kagimoto composed the music for the coupling track "My Beast", while rapper Shinya Taniuchi wrote the rap portion of the lyrics alongside songwriter Saeki youthK, who had previously worked with the group for their 2019 song "Be the Naked."

== Promotional activities ==
"See Your Heart" was used as the ending theme for the Fuji TV series Nariyuki Kaidou Tabi (なりゆき街道旅 / Nariyuki Highway Journey) in the month of April.

On May 14, Lead performed "See Your Heart" at the Sayonara Nakano Sunplaza Music Festival. The festival was the last to be held at Nakano Sunplaza due to the new plaza opening. Lead, along with various other artists - including Ayaka Ōhashi, Reol and Sumire Uesaka, among others - performed throughout the months of May and June to commemorate the long-standing location.

== Track listing ==
CD
No.	Title	Lyrics	Music	Composer(s)	Length
1.	"See Your Heart"	SQVARE • shungo.	Masa Takumi	Masa Takumi	3:23
2.	"My Beast"	Saeki youthK • Shinya Taniuchi (rap)	nishi-ken	Akira Kagimoto	4:02
3.	"Higher Love"	Yuki Tsujimura	Chris Meyer	Chris Meyer • Yuki Tsujimura	3:41
Total length:					11:06

CD: Type A & B
No.	Title	Lyrics	Music	Composer(s)	Length
1.	"See Your Heart"	SQVARE • shungo.	Masa Takumi	Masa Takumi	3:23
2.	"My Beast"	Saeki youthK • Shinya Taniuchi (rap)	nishi-ken	Akira Kagimoto	4:02
Total length:					7:25

Type A: DVD
No.	Title	Length
1.	"See Your Heart" (Music Video)	3:27
2.	"See Your Heart" (Behind the Music Video)

Type B: DVD
No.	Title	Length
1.	"See Your Heart" (Shinya Version) (Music Video)
2.	"See Your Heart" (Keita Version) (Music Video)
3.	"See Your Heart" (Akira Version) (Music Video)

CD+Booklet
No.	Title	Lyrics	Music	Composer(s)	Length
1.	"See Your Heart"	SQVARE • shungo.	Masa Takumi	Masa Takumi	3:23
2.	"Higher Love"	Yuki Tsujimura	Chris Meyer	Chris Meyer • Yuki Tsujimura	3:41
Total length:					7:04

== Charts ==
Release	Chart	Peak position	Total sales
May 24, 2023	Oricon Daily Chart	5	
May 24, 2023	Oricon Weekly Chart	10	
May 24, 2023	Oricon Monthly Chart	47	5,815
