= Luca Salasnich =

Italian theoretical physicist

- Born: 1967 (age 58–59); Padua, Italy
- Education: University of Padua; University of Florence
- Known for: Quantum many-body systems, ultracold atoms, superfluidity
- Awards: Fellow of the American Physical Society (2025)
- Scientific career
- Fields: Theoretical physics
- Workplaces: University of Padua; National Research Council (CNR)
- Thesis: (1995)

Luca Salasnich (born in 1967) is an Italian theoretical physicist and full professor of theoretical physics of matter at the University of Padua. His research concerns quantum many-body systems, with a focus on ultracold atoms, superfluidity, and macroscopic quantum phenomena.

== Education and career ==
Salasnich was born in Padua, Italy. He obtained a master's degree in physics from the University of Padua in 1991 and a PhD in physics from the University of Florence in 1995.

Following his doctoral studies, he held postdoctoral research positions at the Complutense University of Madrid (1995), the University of Maribor (1996), the University of Padua (1996–1997), and the University of Milan (1997–2003).

In 2003, he joined the National Research Council (CNR) as a researcher at the National Institute for the Physics of Matter (INFM).

He became a faculty member of the University of Padua as an associate professor in 2011 and was promoted to full professor in 2021. At the University of Padua, he served as program director of the BSc in Optics and Optometrics from 2013 to 2021 and has been program director of the BSc and MSc in Materials Science since 2024 (term 2024–2028). Internationally, he served as chair of the Physics panel of the Research Foundation – Flanders (FWO) from 2022 to 2024.

== Research ==
Salasnich works in quantum statistical mechanics and the theory of interacting many-body systems. His research focuses on ultracold atomic gases, including Bose–Einstein condensates, the BCS–BEC crossover, and nonlinear phenomena such as solitons and quantized vortices. He has contributed to the development of effective theoretical descriptions of low-dimensional quantum gases and nonlinear dynamics in superfluids, often using mean-field and beyond-mean-field approaches based on nonlinear Schrödinger-type equations.

== Honors and awards ==
Salasnich was elected a Fellow of the American Physical Society in 2025 "for a broad range of theoretical contributions in ultracold atom physics, including analytical solutions to many-body equations, the physics of reduced dimensionality and curved configurations, and the analysis of collective modes, solitons, and quantized vortices". From 2024 he is an ordinary member of the European Academy of Sciences and Arts.

== Books ==
- Quantum Physics of Light and Matter. A Modern Introduction to Photons, Atoms and Many-Body Systems (Springer, 2014)
- Physics and Technologies of Ultracold Atomic Gases (Springer, 2024) with Roberto Onofrio
- Quantum Many Body Theory. A Path Integral Approach (CRC Press, Taylor and Francis Group, 2026)
