= Francfranc =

Japanese company

Francfranc Corporation is a Japanese furniture and home décor company founded in Tokyo in 1990 by Fumio Takashima.

At the end of 2018, it had nearly 140 stores in Japan and Hong Kong, along with headquarters in both places.

The company has about 2000 employees at the end of 2018.

The company was previously named Bals Corporation.

== History ==
Originally named Bals Corporation, the name was changed to Francfranc Corporation in 2017.

Founded in 1990 by Fumio Takashima, a Japanese accomplished entrepreneur, Francfranc Corporation is a furniture and home décor retailer that operate more than 140 stores under the brand name Francfranc.

== The operations ==
The company operates in both online and offline environment.

1 headquarter in Japan (main office with products and sales divisions)

1 headquarter in Hong Kong (retail operations)

134 stores in Japan, including 3 flagship stores in Tokyo, Nagoya and Osaka.

6 stores in Hong Kong.

E-commerce operations are currently serving Japan and Hong Kong.
