= Milestone (Lead album) =

Studio album by Lead
- Released: July 18, 2018
- Recorded: 2016–2018
- Genre: Hip hop, pop, R&B, dance
- Label: Pony Canyon

Lead chronology
The Showcase (2016)	Milestone (2018)	Singularity (2020)

Singles from Milestone
- 1. "Tokyo Fever" Released: March 8, 2017; 2. "Beautiful Day" Released: August 23, 2017; 3. "Bumblebee" Released: April 25, 2018

Milestone is the eighth studio album released by the Japanese hip-hop group Lead on July 18, 2018, released over two years after their previous album The Showcase.

The album included the singles "Tokyo Fever", "Beautiful Day" and "Bumblebee".

Milestone was released in three separate editions; a CD only version, a 2CD edition that contained a special booklet, and a CD+DVD edition, which housed music videos for not only the new track "Love or Love?", but also the videos from the singles. This was the first time all of the music videos from prior singles were placed on the DVD to a studio album.

== Information ==
Milestone debuted at #8 on the Oricon Albums Charts, but climbed to the #7 position, taking the weekly ranking of #8. This became their third consecutive album to chart in the top ten on Oricon, which began with their 2012 album Now or Never. By week seven, the album was at #37, making it their longest charting album.

The album was released in three separate editions: a standard CD containing thirteen musical tracks; a type A CD+DVD edition, which housed music videos for not only the new track "Love or Love?", but all the videos from the singles; and a type B 2CD edition that contained thirteen tracks on the first disc and Mokudan radio show, which was hosted by the group, and a special booklet. The type A and B editions were also given first press limited editions, which included tickets to the group's upcoming tour Lead Upturn 2018 ~Milestone~.

Milestone became the group's first album to harbor all of the corresponding singles' music videos. These were "Tokyo Fever" (2017), "Beautiful Day" and "Shampoo Bubble" from Beautiful Day (2017), and "Bumblebee" (2018).

As a special promotion, beginning July 18 on both Amazon Japan and at CD shops nationwide, buyers were able to get one of two possible "Lead Special Posters" when they purchased either the limited type A or B edition of the album. The posters were available on a first-come, first-served basis. In the first press limited editions of both type A and B of Milestone, special participation tickets were included to the group's nationwide tour Lead Upturn 2018 ~Milestone~, which began August 5, 2018. There were two tickets placed in with the first press editions of the album, combined with a "Changing Jacket Set", that included one of three possible versions.

== Promotional activities ==
Prior to the album's release, the group had released three singles: Tokyo Fever, Beautiful Day and Bumblebee.

"Tokyo Fever" was the twenty-seventh single by Lead, and became their ninth consecutive single to chart in the top five on the Oricon Singles Charts. The single was released in four editions: a standard CD and three limited CD+DVD renditions. Each of the CD+DVD editions carried a different B-side, while all editions carried the title track and the coupling track "Bokura no Yogaakeru Made", along with their corresponding instrumentals. "Beautiful Day" was the twenty-eighth single, becoming the group's tenth consecutive single to chart in the top ten on the Oricon Singles Charts, taking #6 for the week. It was released as a standard CD and three limited CD+DVD editions. The standard edition contained the title track and the two B-sides "Shampoo Bubble" and "Say Good-bye Say Hello", the first of which were placed on Milestone, as was the image video footage.

"Bumblebee" was the twenty-ninth domestic single, peaking at #2 on the Oricon Singles Chart. It was released in four editions: a standard CD, two CD+DVD editions with varying content and a version housing the CD and booklet.

As a special promotion, which began on July 18 with Amazon Japan and at CD shops nationwide, buyers were able to get one of two possible "Lead Special Posters" when they purchased either the limited type A or B edition of the album. The posters were available on a first-come, first-served basis. In the first press limited editions of both type A and B of Milestone, special participation tickets were included to the group's nationwide tour Lead Upturn 2018: Milestone, which began August 5, 2018. There were two tickets placed in with the first press editions of the album, combined with a "Changing Jacket Set", that included one of three possible versions.

== Music videos ==
Prior to the album's release, music videos were released for the songs "Bumblebee", "Tokyo Fever" and "Beautiful Day". There was one new music video created for the album for the song "Love or Love?".

"Love or Love?" was much darker than previous videos. It opens with the trio against a backdrop of neon lights, before introducing each member in solo positions. Much like their other videos, the video is dance-focused. Each member is given a solo after the mid-point of the video, showcasing darker aspects that they had not touched on in previous videos. Keita is shown using sensual red candles, Shinya is shown consuming pomegranate in a sensual manner and Akira is shown with leather handcuffs, which are typically utilized in BDSM. Each member also holds a significant object close to the camera: Akira holds red lipstick, Shinya holds whipped cream and Keita holds up a glass of red wine.

On June 29, 2018, Pony Canyon's official YouTube uploaded the music video of "Love or Love?" to help promote the album.

Though not released on the DVD, the song "Backpack" was given a music video. For the song, the Akira, Shinya and Keita perform the choreography on 21st Century Forest Beach on Okinawa Island. The footage also shows the group around the beach, going to local shops and swimming in the ocean. The dance utilized was choreographed by SUN-CHANG and the dancers in the video were SUN-CHANG, Kyo and Daik.

The video of "Backpack" was uploaded to Pony Canyon's official YouTube on October 10, 2018.

== Track listing ==
Disc 1
No.	Title	Lyrics	Music	Length
1.	"Untitled"		Akira Kagimoto • Fumio Hoshino	1:34
2.	"Bumblebee"	Akira Kagimoto • Shinya Tanuichi (rap)	Drew Ryan Scott • Sean Alexander • Darren "Baby Dee Beats" Smith	3:32
3.	"Love or Love?"	Funk Uchino	SAMDELL • Funk Uchino	4:03
4.	"Backpack"	Akira Kagimoto	Ricky Hanley • Peter Boyes • Sebastian Thott	3:36
5.	"Shampoo Bubble"	Akira Kagimoto • KM-MARKIT (rap)	Chase Ryan • Beau Evans • Sean Alexander	3:19
6.	"Beautiful Day"	Lead	Drew Ryan Scott • Sean Alexander	3:45
7.	"Tell Me Why"	Akira Kagimoto • Shinya Tanuichi (rap)	KEN for 2 SOUL MUSIC Inc. • JUNE	4:11
8.	"Kore Made, Kore Kara" (これまで、これから / So Far, From Now On)	Saeki youthK	Saeki youthK	6:31
9.	"Medalist" (メダリスト)	Akira Kagimoto • Shinya Tanuichi (rap)	Akira Kagimoto	4:26
10.	"R.O.O.T.S"	Akira Kagimoto • Shinya Tanuichi	Shinya Tanuichi • SEQUICK	3:26
11.	"Tokyo Fever"	Shinya Tanuichi • Saeki youthK • CLARABELL	CLARABELL	3:52
12.	"Give Me Your Best Shot"	Keita Furuya	Alexander Holmgren • Command Freaks	3:23
13.	"Funk This Time!"	Funk Uchino	Kevin Charge • Johan Becker • Yoko Hiramatsu	3:21
Total length:				48:59

Disc 2
No.	Title	Length
1.	"MokudanSP Lead MILESTONE RADIO" (モクダンSP)	1:29:02
Total length:		1:29:02

DVD
No.	Title	Director(s)	Length
1.	"Love or Love?" (Music Video)	Tatsuya Murakami	4:08
2.	"Bumblebee" (Music Video)	Hideaki Sunaga	4:00
3.	"Beautiful Day" (Music Video)	Yoshiharu Seri	4:22
4.	"Shampoo Bubble" (Image Movie in Hawaii)	Seijiro Tashiro	3:19
5.	"Tokyo Fever" (Music Video)	Jun Nakao	4:14
6.	"Milestone" (Behind the Photo Shooting)	Minoru Kieda	30:23
7.	"Love or Love?" (Behind the Music Video)	Sou Yasui	8:56
Total length:			59:22

== Personnel ==
Credits are adapted from album’s Liner Notes

Musicians

- Shinya Tanuichi - vocals
- Keita Furuya - vocals
- Akira Kagimoto - vocals

Production

- Naotaka Yamaguchi - producer
- Hajime Kodama - director
- Masato Mukaida - director
- Yoshihiro Kinoshita - coordination
- Yukihito Sakakibara - music producer
- Takashi Kasuga - supervisor
- T. Taira - executive producer
- Atsushi Chiba - executive producer
- Hideaki Hiraki - artist management
- Takashi Tsuboi - audio and recording
- Kazuto Hiraga - products coordinator
- Takashi Kasai - sales promotion
- Nobuaki Iijima - art direction
- Misa Tsukagoshi - design
- Yuriko Saito - design
- Michito Goto - photographer
- Yuya Murata - stylist
- Shunsuke Takata - hair and make-up

== Charts (Japan) ==
=== Album ===
Release	Chart	Peak position	Chart run	Total sales
July 18, 2018	Oricon Daily Albums Chart	7		
July 18, 2018	Oricon Weekly Albums Chart	8	8 weeks	14,218
July 18, 2018	Oricon Monthly Album Charts	30	2 months	15,405

=== Singles ===
Date	Title	Peak position	Weeks	Sales
March 8, 2017	Tokyo Fever	5	3 weeks	28,671 copies
August 23, 2017	Beautiful Day	6	4 weeks	17,728 copies
April 25, 2018	Bumblebee	2	4 weeks	18,791 copies
