= Tokyo Fever =

Single by Lead

from the album Milestone
- B-side: "Bokura no Yogākeru Made"; "Funkenstein" (Type A); "Dilemma" (Type B); "Gimme a Call" (Type C)
- Released: March 8, 2017
- Recorded: 2017
- Genre: J-pop, hip hop
- Label: Pony Canyon
- Songwriters: Clarabell; Lead (band); Shinya Tanuichi; Akira Kagimoto; Keita Furuya; Saeki Yuusuke; Boy Ski Mask; Paleo; Dey Gon Get It; DWB; Christian Hoff; Aileen De La Cruz; Denis Seo; Niel; Shin Seung-Ik
- Producer: Clarabell

Lead singles chronology
"Yakusoku" (2015)	"Tokyo Fever" (2017)	"Beautiful Day" (2017)

"Tokyo Fever" (トーキョーフィーバー) is the 27th single by Japanese hip-hop trio Lead. It was their first single after their seventh studio album The Showcase to bring in their new era, Milestone. The single charted well on Oricon, ranking at No. 5, keeping their run of top releases, and remained on the charts for three weeks.

The single was released on March 8, 2017, a year-and-a-half after their previous single "Yakusoku", which was released in November 2015.

== Information ==
Keeping in-line with their chart-topping releases, which began with "Wanna Be with You" in early 2012, "Tokyo Fever" became their ninth consecutive single to chart in the top five and took the No. 5 spot on the Oricon Singles Chart, remaining on the charts for three consecutive weeks.

The single was released in four editions: a standard CD and three limited CD+DVD renditions. Each of the CD+DVD editions carried a different B-side. All editions carried the title track and the coupling track "Bokura no Yogākeru Made" (僕らの夜が明けるまで / "Until Our Night Is Over"), along with their corresponding instrumentals. Type A, which had a turquoise backdrop, carried the bonus track "Funkenstein", its corresponding instrumental and the music video for "Tokyo Fever". Type B, which featured a yellow backdrop, contained the bonus track "Dilemma", its corresponding instrumental and the dance version of "Tokyo Fever". Type C, which had a pink backdrop, carried the bonus track "Gimme a Call", its corresponding instrumental and a dance tutorial video for "Tokyo Fever".

For "Tokyo Fever", the lyrics were written by Saeki Yuusuke and Japanese duo Clarabell, with the rap portions written by Lead's rapper Shinya Taniuchi. "Bokura no Yogākeru Made" lyrics were written by Paleo with the music written by Boy Ski Mask, Dey Gon Get It, along with Paleo. "Funkenstein" was written and composed by Keita Furuya and Shinya Taniuchi. The composition was done by Christian Hoff, DWB and Aileen De La Cruz. "Dilemma" was written and composed by Shinya, becoming his personal project. "Gimme a Call" was written by Denis Seo, Shin Seung-Ik and Neil. The lyrical portion was written by the youngest member of Lead, Akira Kagimoto.

== Background and composition ==
"Tokyo Fever" was composed by the Japanese music producing duo Clarabell, as were the instrumentals. The lyrics were written by Saeki Yuusuke (also known by his stage name 佐伯youthK or Saeki youthK) and Clarabell, with the rap portions written by Lead's rapper Shinya Taniuchi. One of Clarabell's more famous credits was on Japanese singer-songwriter Kumi Koda's song "Go to the Top", which had charted at No. 1 on the Oricon Singles Charts in 2012. Clarabell have also worked predominantly with Japanese collective girl group E-girls.

The lyrics of "Bokura no Yogākeru Made" were written by Paleo with the music written by Boy Ski Mask, Dey Gon Get It, along with Paleo. "Funkenstein" was a collaborative effort for the lyrics and production with members Keita Furuya and Shinya Taniuchi. The composition was done by Christian Hoff, DWB and Aileen De La Cruz. "Dilemma" was written and composed by Shinya, becoming his personal project. "Gimme a Call" was written by Denis Seo, Shin Seung-Ik and Neil. The lyrical portion was written by the youngest member of Lead, Akira Kagimoto.

== Track listing ==
CD
No.	Title	Lyrics	Music	Arranger(s)	Length
1.	"Tokyo Fever" (トーキョーフィーバー)	Saeki Yuusuke • Clarabell • Shinya Tanuichi	Clarabell	Clarabell	3:54
2.	"Bokura no Yogākeru Made" (僕らの夜が明けるまで / "Until Our Night Is Over")	Paleo	Paleo • Boy Ski Mask • Dey Gon Get It	Paleo • Boy Ski Mask • Dey Gon Get It	4:09
3.	"Tokyo Fever" (instrumental)		Clarabell	Clarabell	3:54
4.	"Bokura no Yogākeru Made" (instrumental)		Paleo • Boy Ski Mask • Dey Gon Get It	Paleo • Boy Ski Mask • Dey Gon Get It	4:09

Type A
No.	Title	Lyrics	Music	Arranger(s)	Length
1.	"Tokyo Fever"	Saeki Yuusuke • Clarabell • Shinya Tanuichi	Clarabell	Clarabell	3:54
2.	"Bokura no Yogākeru Made"	Paleo	Paleo • Boy Ski Mask • Dey Gon Get It	Paleo • Boy Ski Mask • Dey Gon Get It	4:09
3.	"Funkenstein"	Keita Furuya • Shinya Tanuichi	Christian Hoff • DWB • Aileen De La Cruz	Christian Hoff • DWB • Aileen De La Cruz	4:01
4.	"Tokyo Fever" (instrumental)		Clarabell	Clarabell	3:54
5.	"Bokura no Yogākeru Made" (instrumental)		Paleo • Boy Ski Mask • Dey Gon Get It	Paleo • Boy Ski Mask • Dey Gon Get It	4:09
6.	"Funkenstein" (instrumental)		Christian Hoff • DWB • Aileen De La Cruz	Christian Hoff • DWB • Aileen De La Cruz	4:01

Type A: DVD
No.	Title	Length
1.	"Tokyo Fever" (music video)
2.	"Tokyo Fever" (making video)

Type B
No.	Title	Lyrics	Music	Arranger(s)	Length
1.	"Tokyo Fever"	Saeki Yuusuke • Clarabell • Shinya Tanuichi	Clarabell	Clarabell	3:54
2.	"Bokura no Yogākeru Made"	Paleo	Paleo • Boy Ski Mask • Dey Gon Get It	Paleo • Boy Ski Mask • Dey Gon Get It	4:09
3.	"Dilemma"	Shinya Tanuichi	Shinya Tanuichi	Shinya Tanuichi
4.	"Tokyo Fever" (instrumental)		Clarabell	Clarabell	3:54
5.	"Bokura no Yogākeru Made" (instrumental)		Paleo • Boy Ski Mask • Dey Gon Get It	Paleo • Boy Ski Mask • Dey Gon Get It
6.	"Dilemma" (instrumental)		Shinya Tanuichi	Shinya Tanuichi

Type B: DVD
No.	Title	Length
1.	"Tokyo Fever" (dance-focused music video)
2.	"Behind the Scenes" (photo shoot)

Type C
No.	Title	Lyrics	Music	Arranger(s)	Length
1.	"Tokyo Fever"	Saeki Yuusuke • Clarabell • Shinya Tanuichi	Clarabell	Clarabell	3:54
2.	"Bokura no Yogākeru Made"	Paleo	Paleo • Boy Ski Mask • Dey Gon Get It	Paleo • Boy Ski Mask • Dey Gon Get It	4:09
3.	"Gimme a Call"	Akira Yamaoka	Denis Seo • Shin Seung-Ik • Neil	Denis Seo • Shin Seung-Ik • Neil	3:47
4.	"Tokyo Fever" (instrumental)		Clarabell	Clarabell	3:54
5.	"Bokura no Yogākeru Made" (instrumental)		Paleo • Boy Ski Mask • Dey Gon Get It	Paleo • Boy Ski Mask • Dey Gon Get It	4:09
6.	"Gimme a Call" (instrumental)		Denis Seo • Shin Seung-Ik • Neil	Denis Seo • Shin Seung-Ik • Neil	3:47

Type C: DVD
No.	Title	Length
1.	"Tokyo Fever" (How to Dance Video)
2.	"Behind the Scenes" (Recording)

== Charts ==
Release	Chart	Peak position
March 8, 2017	Oricon Weekly Singles Chart	5
