= After Romeo =

American band

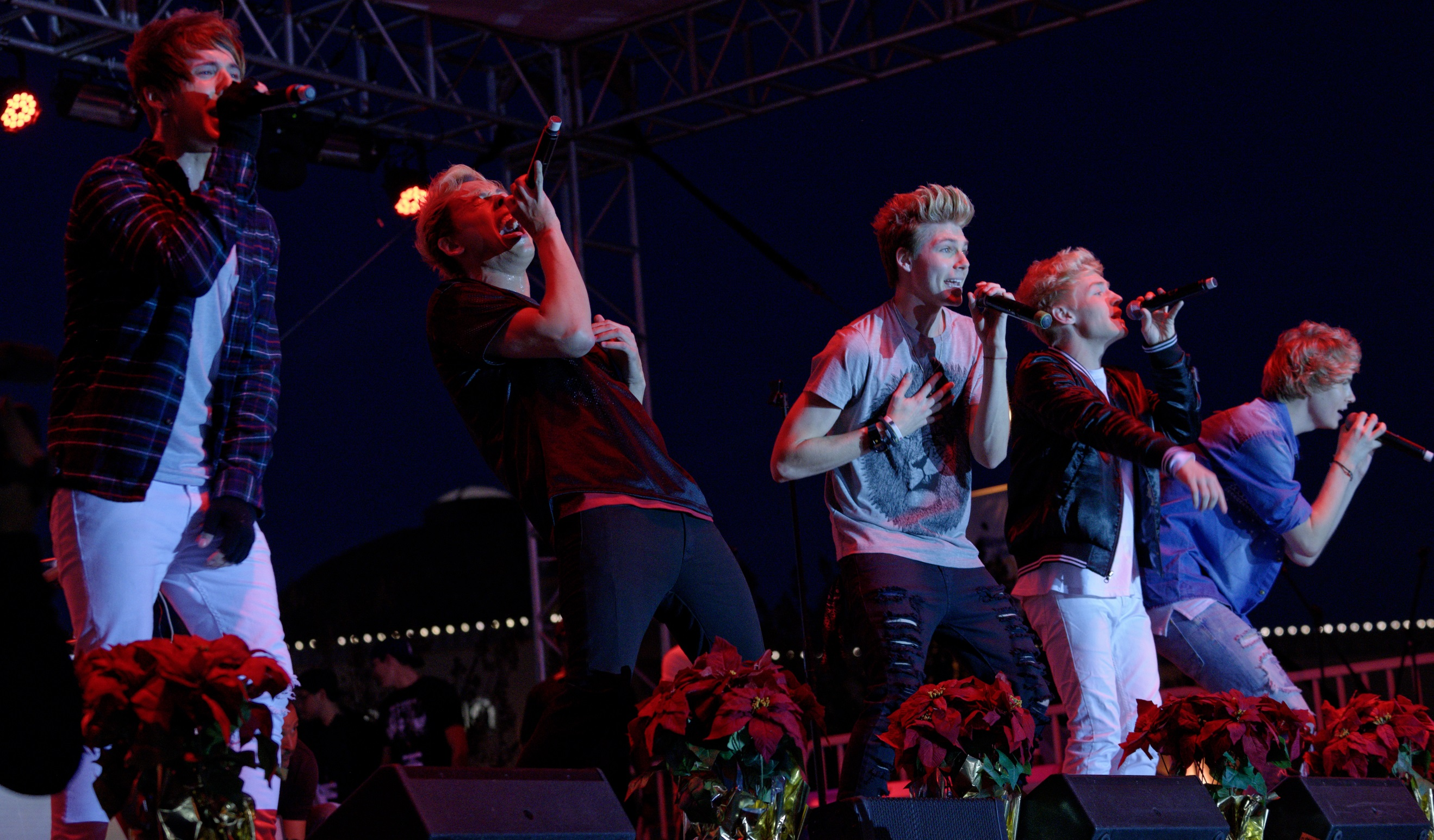
- After Romeo performing in 2014

Background information
- Also known as: Varsity Fanclub
- Origin: Los Angeles, California, United States
- Genres: Pop, electropop, dance-pop, teen pop
- Years active: 2012–2017
- Label: INGROOVES
- Past members: Blake English; Drew Ryan Scott; Jayk Purdy; T.C. Carter; Devin Fox
- Website: afterromeoworld.com

After Romeo (also stylized as AfteRomeo) was a boy band based in Los Angeles, California. The band was formed in 2012, originally consisting of Drew Ryan Scott, Jayk Purdy, T.C. Carter, Blake English and Devin Fox. They debuted on May 1, 2013 with "Free Fall".

After signing with Sony Music Japan, the group released an album titled "The Story Continues..." exclusively in Japan. After Devin Fox's departure, the group rebranded and released the EP "Good Things" on all streaming platforms.

The band disbanded in 2017, during Devin Fox's lawsuit against the group.

== History ==
=== 2012–2013: Formation and debut with "Free Fall" ===
On February 1, 2012, the three remaining members of Varsity Fanclub, Drew Ryan Scott, Jayk Purdy and T.C. Carter, posted a video to their YouTube page asking fans to help them pick a new group name as they wanted to have a fresh start. Four months later, they revealed After Romeo as their new band name, meaning that they would be "dedicated to their fans as Romeo was to Juliet." With this rebrand, two new members, Blake English and Devin Fox, were introduced. Blake English was introduced to the other members via T.C. Carter, as the two of them were childhood friends who grew up together in Georgia. Meanwhile, Devin Fox was discovered by Drew Ryan Scott online. They kept in contact until finally meeting each other at a performing arts school in Los Angeles where Drew spoke as a songwriter/producer.

After several weeks of songwriting, recording, and rehearsals, the group officially signed with Jonnie Forster's 4SOUND Label.

On May 1, 2013, the group made their debut with the release of the music video for "Free Fall", which would later be released as a single to streaming platforms on July 1. While the video was filmed long before this, they decided to save it for an important occasion as the production was rather expensive and Drew Ryan Scott funded the project out of his own pocket. They eventually released the video after Jayk Purdy secured the band a partnership with Vevo. Additionally, the music video reached number one on MTV's most viewed music video chart on June 30 and was featured on their front page in July as one of their favorite videos.

=== 2014: The Bully-Proof Tour and Love on Lock EP ===
In 2014, After Romeo partnered with several artists and went on a 300-school and 35-mall Bully Proof Tour, where they traveled across the country to give daily performances and to educate fans about the issue of bullying in hopes to establish a bully-free community. Each member of the group stood before students and parents to share their own experiences with bullying and the negative long-term effects that may come out of it.

The group released their first unofficial EP, entitled the Love on Lock EP, exclusively for those who attended their Bully Proof concerts. The track list included "Love on Lock", "On Our Side", "One Night", "Mr. Impatient", "Meet Me in my Dreams", "Love on Lock (Acoustic)", and "Love on Lock (Instrumental)". The EP was not released on any streaming platforms.

The same year, they partnered up with David Lehre to produce the music videos for "Love on Lock" and "Juliet".

=== 2015–2016: Japan Tour and The Story Continues…, Devin Fox's departure, rebrand and Good Things EP ===
In 2015, After Romeo signed a major record deal with Sony Japan for their Asian territory tours. With Sony, the group was able to reach a new audience via Vogue Japan interviews, exclusive YouTube videos, and a new tour. The tour garnered major attention for the group, allowing them to release their debut album "The Story Continues…" exclusively in Japan.

The Japanese release of the album notably left out the songs "Thirsty", "Superhuman", and "Fight for Love". Drew explained in an interview that the songs were replaced with "Hard to Get", "Overnight", and "Tokyo 2 LA" because they wanted to introduce J-Rock-sounding tracks for the Japanese market. The latter tracks were scheduled to be included in the US release of the album (which was shelved).

On June 5, 2015, After Romeo made a post on Facebook announcing that they would be participating in that summer's Pop Nation Tour, which would kick off on July 12, and that Devin Fox had left the group following careful consideration. The Pop nation tour served as a taste of their new sound going forward, as they performed remixes of their songs "Free Fall", "Love on Lock", as well as a new song called "Handmade".

Shortly after finishing up their stay on the Pop Nation Tour, the group returned on August 11, 2015 with "Where the People Go", which was written by Drew Ryan Scott and Blake English during the writing camp. It was at this point where the group focused on shifting their sound from generic "bubble-gum" pop music to indie pop with folk and R&B influences.

In May 2016, the group was one of the 25 artists nominated for a chance to open the 2016 iHeartRadio Music Festival in Las Vegas through Macy's iHeartRadio Rising Star campaign and finished in the final top 5. The same month, they partnered up with Samsung to star in a world-wide commercial promoting the Samsung Galaxy S7 – which included a VR headset feature.

On June 24, 2016, After Romeo released the Good Things EP. The single included the singles "Convenience", "Good Things", three new original songs "Pull Over", "Shut Up", "Oprah", and a remix of "Good Things", which were selected from a total of 30 songs written during their writing camp. The EP is described as a mix of "pop and R&B with a little bit of soul", showcasing the members' influences, strengths and musical growth.

=== 2017: Devin Fox's lawsuit against the group and disbandment ===
On September 7, 2017, Devin Fox filed a lawsuit via the Los Angeles Superior Court against the entire group (including their label 4SOUND) – alleging everything from sexual battery and harassment to emotional distress and negligence. While the suit was ongoing, the group quietly disbanded. Jayk, T.C., and Blake were shortly dismissed from the suit due to lack of fault.

The case was settled and did not go to trial. Drew Ryan Scott agreed to pay an undisclosed monthly settlement amount until 2024.

== Discography ==
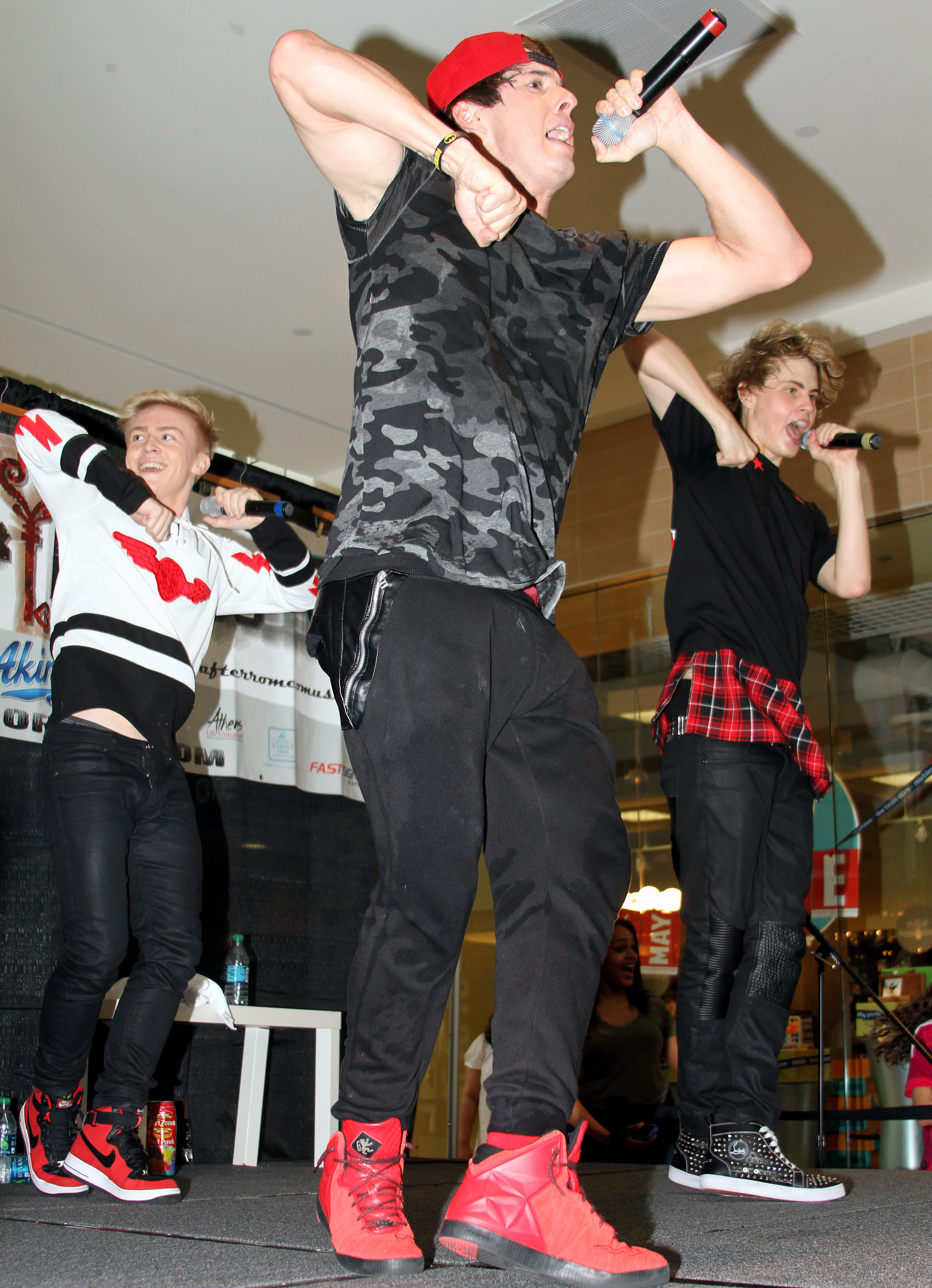
After Romeo performing in Peabody, Massachusetts, in 2014

=== Albums ===
- We're Coming Home (2014)
- The Story Continues... (2015) (Japan)

=== EPs ===
- Love On Lock EP (2014)
- Good Things EP (2016)

=== Singles ===
- "Free Fall" (2013)
- "Save Some Snow" (2013)
- "Love on Lock" (2014)
- "Where the People Go" (2015)
- "Thank You" (2015)
- "Souvenir" (2015)
- "Meet Me in My Dreams" (2015)
- "Good Things" (2016)
- "Convenience" (2016)
- "Good Things (Dave Audé Remix)" (2016)
- "Pull Over (Remix)" (feat. Silentó) (2016)
- "Shut Up (and Kiss Me)" (2017)
- "How It Happens" (2017)
