= New York skyscrapers =

New York skyscrapers may refer to:

- Skyscrapers identified in List of tallest buildings in New York City
- New York skyscraper paintings of Georgia O'Keeffe

== See also ==
- Cityscape
- Early skyscrapers
