= Radiator Building – Night, New York =

1927 oil painting by Georgia O'Keeffe

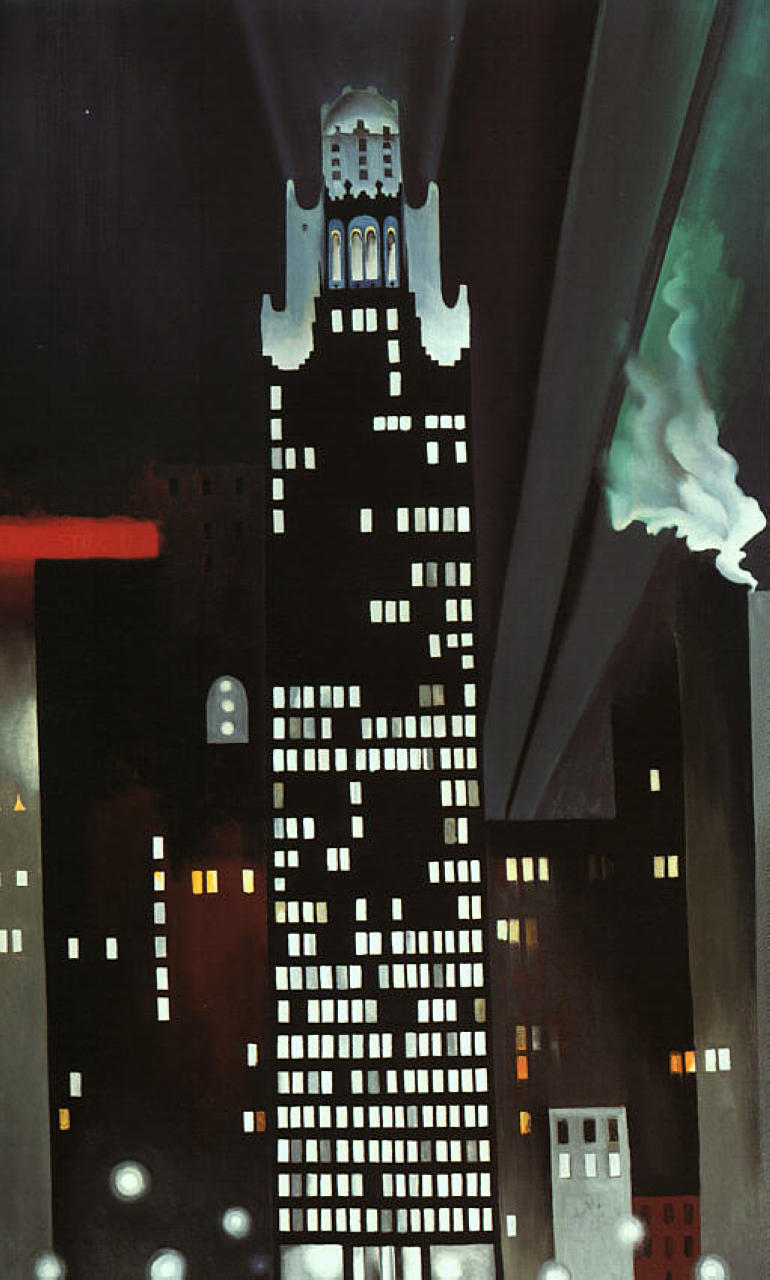
- Georgia O'Keeffe, Radiator Building – Night, New York, 1927, oil on canvas, 48 x 30 inches, Carl Van Vechten Gallery, Fisk University
- Artist: Georgia O'Keeffe
- Year: 1927
- Medium: Oil on canvas
- Dimensions: 48 x 30 in. (121.9 x 76.2 cm)
- Location: Carl Van Vechten Gallery, Fisk University, Nashville, Tennessee

Radiator Building – Night, New York is a 1927 oil painting by the American 20th-century artist Georgia O’Keeffe. It depicts the American Radiator Building (also known as the American Standard building), which is located at 40 West 40th Street in New York City. The skyscraper is located just south of Bryant Park in Midtown Manhattan, a few blocks away from where O’Keeffe lived at the Shelton Hotel. The painting is part of a larger series of New York City skyscrapers that O’Keeffe created between 1925 and 1929. Radiator Building epitomizes O'Keeffe's distinct Precisionist style. The work is also significant because it is believed to be a portrait of O’Keeffe’s husband, Alfred Stieglitz. The portrait is often interpreted as a scathing criticism of Stieglitz during a tumultuous time in their relationship.

After Stieglitz’s death, the painting was donated to Fisk University in Nashville, Tennessee by O’Keeffe as part of the Alfred Stieglitz Collection. Currently, the work is co-owned by Fisk University and the Crystal Bridges Museum in Bentonville, Arkansas. Radiator Building and the other works in the Alfred Stieglitz Collection alternate between spending every two years at Fisk’s Carl Van Vechten Gallery and the Crystal Bridges Museum.

== Description ==
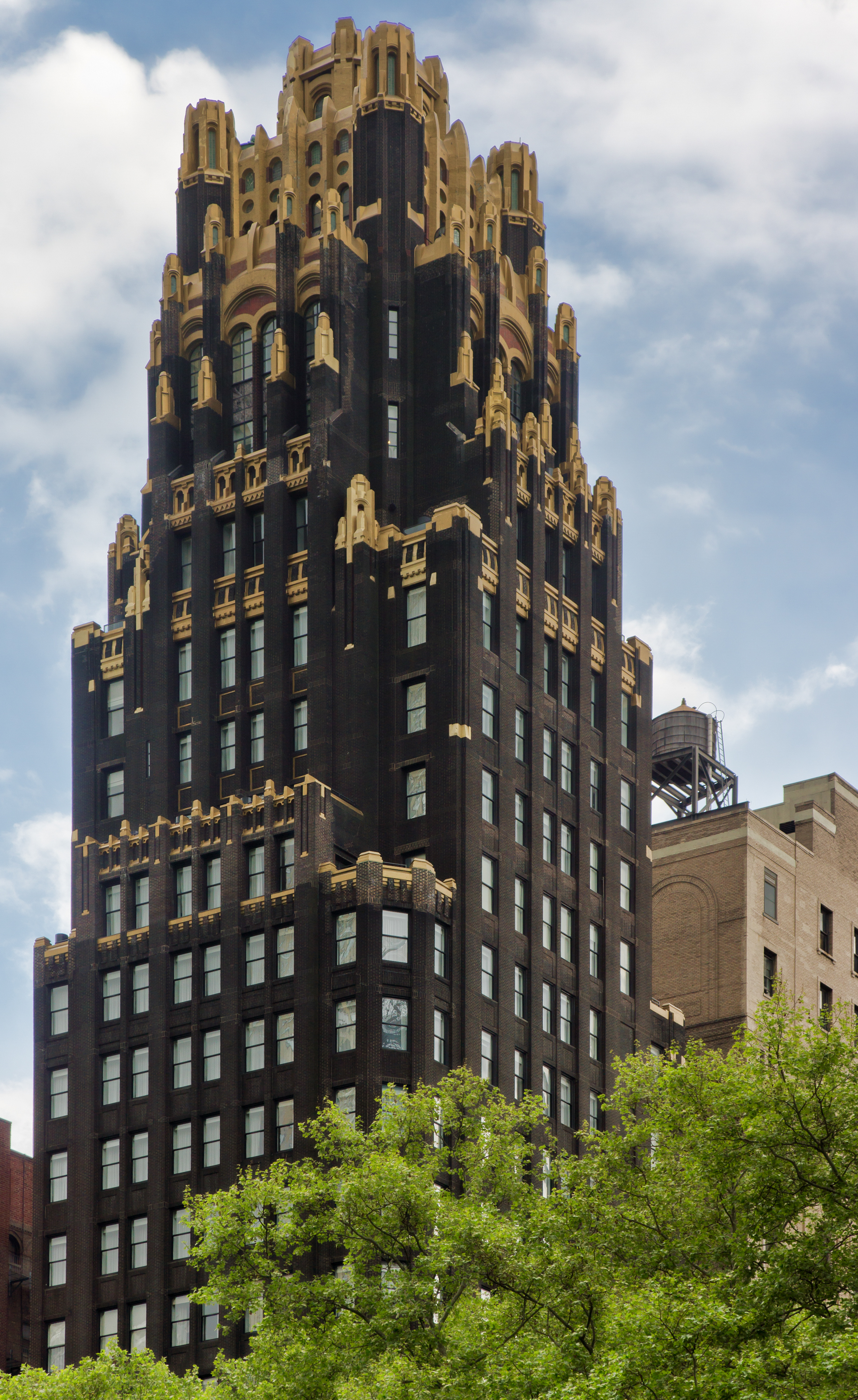
American Radiator Building seen from Bryant Park

The American Radiator Building dominates the center of the composition. About the building, O'Keeffe stated, "I walked across 42nd Street many times at night when the black Radiator Building was new – so that had to be painted, too." The building was known for its black exterior, Gothic style, ornate top, and illuminating floodlights that only highlighted the building at night. These qualities are featured in O'Keefe's artwork. However, she left out the gold ornamentation that decorates the facade. In the painting, the building appears very flat due to her simplified shapes, minimal details, and Precisionist style. The work has been described as utilizing contrasting elements like the straight lines of the buildings and light beams and the fluid lines of the smoke. On the right, a red neon sign spells out “Alfred Stieglitz,” hinting at the symbolism behind the subject. This sign in real life actually read "Scientific American."

== Context ==
O’Keeffe and Stieglitz had a complicated personal and professional relationship. Stieglitz was a prominent American photographer and modern art gallery owner, who was instrumental in promoting and shaping O’Keefe’s artistic career. Stieglitz acted as her manager, gallerist, and agent along with being her romantic partner. They met after Stieglitz displayed charcoal drawings by O’Keeffe in his gallery 291 without her permission. O’Keeffe was living in Texas at the time, but she traveled to New York to reprimand him for the unsanctioned exhibit. Several months later, Steiglitz convinced O’Keeffe to move to New York despite the fact that he was married to Emmeline Obermeyer. Stieglitz and Obermeyer eventually divorced, and he married O’Keeffe four months after the divorce was finalized.

As her manager, Stieglitz exerted a lot of control over how O’Keeffe’s art was perceived. Stieglitz frequently presented O’Keeffe as a female artist who embodied uniquely feminine qualities in her artwork. He was also part of the reason O'Keeffe’s famous flower paintings were closely associated with female genitalia, as he would display the flower paintings alongside nude photographs of O’Keeffe. O’Keeffe rejected the sexualization of her art and turned to masculine subjects as a statement against her critics. Skyscrapers were coded as a masculine subject, and O’Keeffe became interested in the subject after the couple moved into an apartment at the Shelton Hotel in Midtown Manhattan. Over the next five years, she frequently painted skyscrapers and cityscapes of New York. Stieglitz and other members of their circle did not approve of her affinity for this new subject. When discussing her apartment at the Shelton Hotel, O’Keeffe stated, “I had never lived up so high before and was so excited that I began talking about trying to paint New York. Of course, I was told that it was an impossible idea… I was accustomed to disagreement and went on with my idea of painting New York.” In addition to the couple’s disagreements on O’Keeffe’s painting subjects, Stieglitz started an affair with another American photographer, Dorothy Norman, in 1927, the same year Radiator Building was painted. This affair lasted until Stieglitz's death.

When Stieglitz died in 1946, O'Keeffe was named the executor of his estate. She was in charge of distributing his extensive art collection. As a gallery owner, he had collected thousands of paintings, photographs, sculptures, and other objects during his lifetime. In 1949, the majority of the collection was divided amongst three institutions: the Art Institute of Chicago, the Metropolitan Museum of Art in New York, and Fisk University in Nashville.

== Critical interpretation ==
Radiator Building has been interpreted as a criticism of Alfred Stieglitz. On the left side of Radiator Building, his name is emblazoned in neon red on a billboard sign, a common method of advertisement. The American Radiator Building was named after the American Radiator Company, which manufactured and sold radiators. The name of the building acted as an advertisement for the company’s product. Vanderbilt art history professor Vivien Green Fryd interprets the theme of advertisement as an attack on Stieglitz. Stieglitz openly despised commercial advertising and the marketing of art. Fryd argues that O’Keeffe is utilizing irony to showcase the dissonance between Stieglitz’s values and practices. Despite Stieglitz’s open spite for the commercialization of art, he contributed to the problem by charging high prices for artwork in his gallery and fiercely marketing his core artists.

== Lawsuit ==
During the early 2000s, Fisk University faced significant financial struggles, and the school was in danger of closing. To solve their financial crisis, the university attempted to sell Radiator Building and another painting by Marsden Hartley. At the time, the university hoped to raise $20 million through the sale of the two paintings. Radiator Building was projected to break the previous sale record for an O'Keeffe painting, which was $6.3 million. Fisk University immediately faced legal issues after announcing they were selling the artworks. When the collection was donated to Fisk, O’Keeffe placed several restrictions on the donation, including “the university could not sell the artwork” and “Fisk must display the works as one collection in its gallery.” The sale of the two paintings would violate these terms.

In 2007, the Georgia O’Keeffe Museum in Santa Fe, New Mexico sued Fisk for trying to sell the paintings. The museum acted as a representative of O’Keeffe’s estate, and the institution argued that the sale would violate O'Keeffe's restrictions on the donation. Fisk and the Georgia O’Keeffe Museum tried to reach a settlement. The museum wanted to buy Radiator Building for $7.5 million, which was under the projected sale price of the painting. In exchange, the Georgia O’Keeffe Museum would not interfere if Fisk decided to sell more paintings from the Alfred Stieglitz Collection. However, the court rejected this proposal, and the museum eventually dropped its lawsuit.

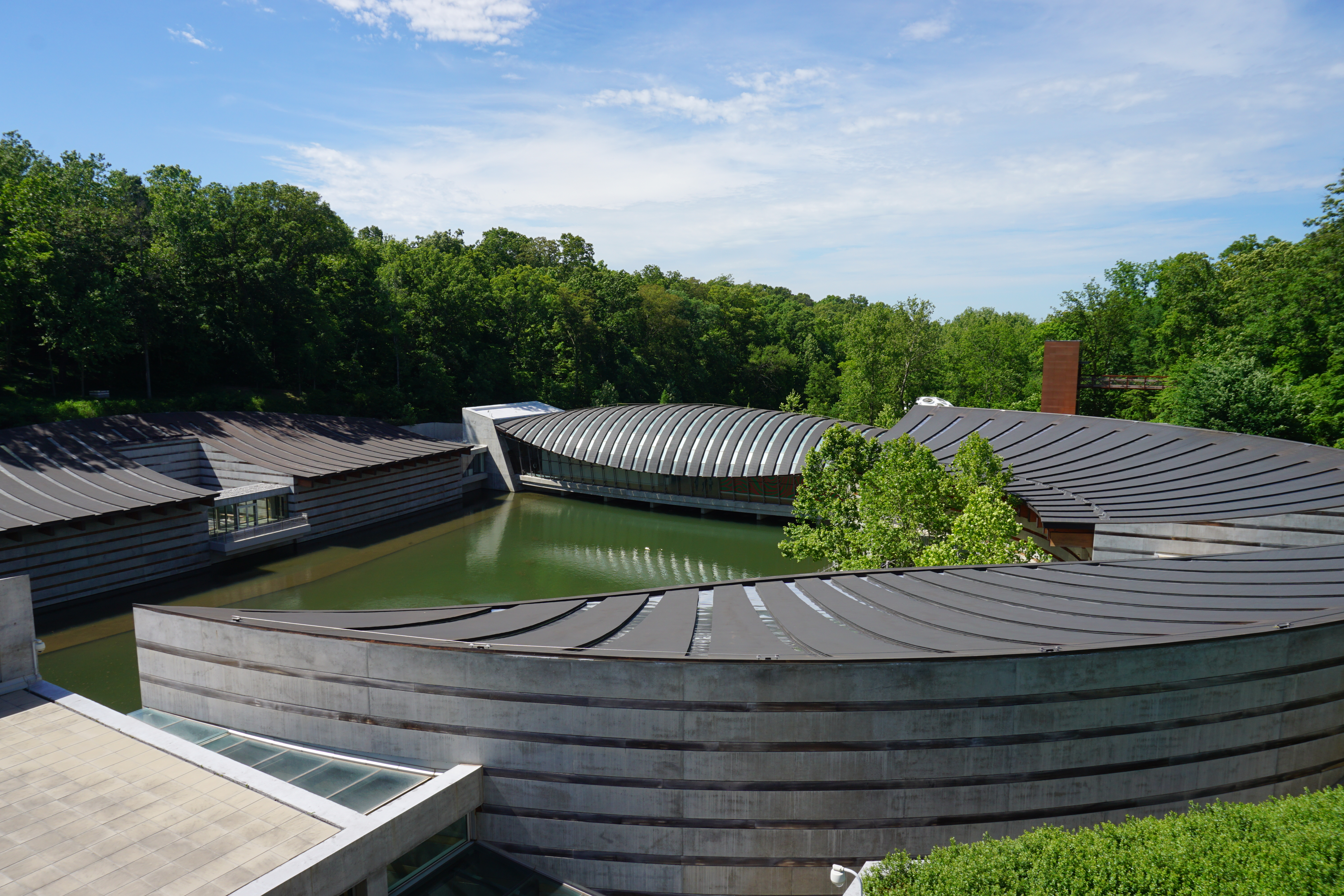
Crystal Bridges Museum in Bentonville, Arkansas

In April of 2012, the Tennessee Supreme Court upheld a lower court decision to allow Fisk University to sell a 50% stake of the Alfred Stieglitz Collection to the Crystal Bridges Museum of American Art. The courts determined that Fisk was able to justify the deal under the cy près doctrine. The Crystal Bridges Museum paid Fisk $30 million to display the collection for two out of every four years, and the museum also received the right of first refusal if the collection ever goes on sale again. The founder of Crystal Bridges, Walmart heiress Alice Walton, also donated an additional $1 million to the university for the improvement of its display facilities. This deal helped the university stay open, and Radiator Building was able to stay a part of Fisk’s collection.
