= Värde Partners =

Investment management firm based in New York, New York

Värde Partners, Inc.
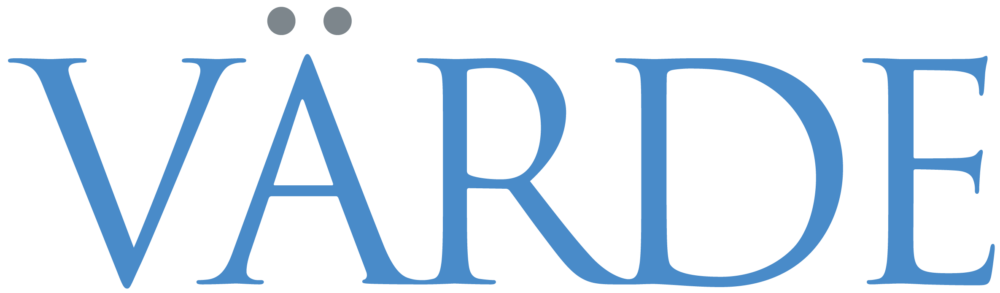
- Type: Private
- Industry: Investment Management
- Founded: 1993; 33 years ago
- Founders: George Hicks; Marcia Page; Greg McMillan
- Headquarters: 520 Madison Ave, New York, New York, U.S.
- Key people: Tim Mooney (Partner); Francisco Milone (Partner); Haseeb Malik (Partner); Jim Dunbar (Partner); Missy Dolski (Partner)
- Products: Public credit; Private credit; Distressed securities; Real estate
- AUM: US$16 billion (2025)
- Number of employees: 246 (2023)
- Website: www.varde.com

Värde Partners (Värde) is a global alternative investment management firm headquartered in New York City. The firm focuses on investments in credit-related assets with a history in distressed securities although it has also expanded into other areas of alternative investments including real estate, asset-based finance, corporate credit and Asia credit. Värde has invested more than $110 billion across public and private markets.

The firm has additional offices in Minneapolis, Luxembourg, London, Mumbai and Singapore.

== Background ==
Värde Partners was founded in 1993 by three former Cargill financial executives, George Hicks, Marcia Page and Greg McMillan. Värde gets its name from the Swedish word for value.

Värde originally started as a hedge fund that focused on distressed securities and grew slowly in its early years before expanding into other alternative investments. At the end of 2020, Värde had around 500 clients which were institutional investors.

In 2025, Värde moved its headquarters from Minneapolis to New York.

During the COVID-19 pandemic, Värde portfolio managers saw significant investment opportunities due to historic market dislocations and economic disruption, and invested in senior bonds of select U.S. carriers that it believed could sustain reduced traffic for a significant period.

All three co-founders of Värde have now retired from active management of the firm. McMillan retired in 2008, Page retired in 2015, and Hicks retired in January 2022. Page and Hicks remain members of the board for Värde. Värde is 100% owned and led by partners in the firm.

== Notable deals ==
In 2011, Värde did a debt-for-equity swap with Crest Nicholson become its majority owner. When Crest Nicholson relisted in 2013, its share price significantly increased allowing Värde to profit from its sale.

In March 2015, consortium of investors that included Värde, Deutsche Bank and Kohlberg Kravis Roberts acquired GE Capital's consumer lending business in Australia and New Zealand for $6.3 billion. It was renamed to Latitude Financial Services.

In November 2016, Citigroup agreed to sell its Canadian subprime lending unit, CitiFinancial Canada to Värde and J.C. Flowers & Co. for an undisclosed amount.

In January 2018, Värde and Apollo Global Management acquired a 40.5% stake of OneMain Financial from Fortress Investment Group for $1.4 billion.

In February 2023, Värde and Hawkins Way Capital acquired New York Marriott East Side from DekaBank for $153.4 million. This was a loss of nearly $117 million from its previous sale price.

In March 2023, Värde was reported to have made over $50 million in profits after it invested in senior unsecured bonds and held equity short positions in Credit Suisse. Värde increased its bond investment when it the acquisition of Credit Suisse by UBS looked more likely and would spare the bondholders from most losses. While Värde lost money from additional tier one bonds, overall its bet had a return greater than 20%.

In July 2023, after Goldman Sachs closed its consumer lending arm Marcus, it sold $1 Billion of Marcus Loans to Värde.
