= 525 Lexington Avenue =

Building in Manhattan, New York

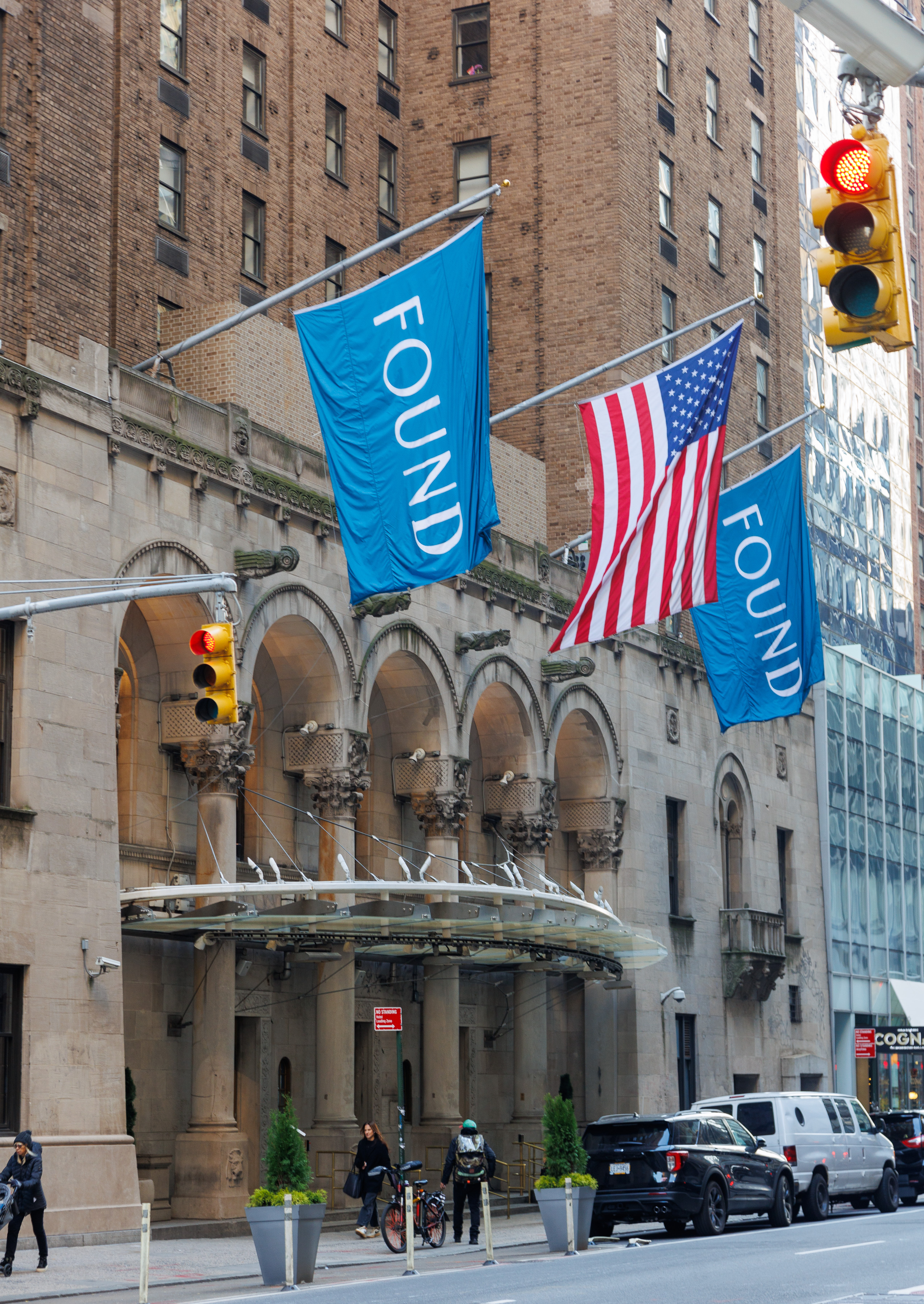
- The building with FOUND branding in 2023
- Former names: New York Marriott East Side; Shelton Hotel; Shelton Towers Hotel; Halloran House
- Alternative names: FOUND Study Turtle Bay

General information
- Architectural style: Romanesque Revival, other
- Location: 525 Lexington Avenue, Manhattan, New York, US
- Coordinates: 40°45′20″N 73°58′22″W
- Construction started: 1922
- Completed: 1923
- Opened: January 1924
- Closed: March 2020 (as hotel)

Height
- Height: 387 ft (118 m)

Technical details
- Floor count: 35

Design and construction
- Architect: Arthur Loomis Harmon
- Developer: James T. Lee
- Awards: Gold Medal of Honor, Architectural League of New York (1925); Gold Medal, New York Chapter of the American Institute of Architects (1925)

Other information
- Number of rooms: 655

New York City Landmark
- Designated: November 22, 2016
- Reference no.: 2557

525 Lexington Avenue (also FOUND Study Turtle Bay; formerly the Shelton Hotel, Shelton Towers Hotel, Halloran House, and the New York Marriott East Side) is a student dormitory and former hotel building at 525 Lexington Avenue in Midtown Manhattan, New York City, United States. The 34-story, 387 ft (118 m) building was designed by Arthur Loomis Harmon in a classical style and was developed by James T. Lee, grandfather of First Lady Jacqueline Bouvier Kennedy Onassis. It was constructed between 1922 and 1923 as the Shelton Hotel, an apartment hotel. The Marriott East Side, one of several large hotels developed around Grand Central Terminal as part of Terminal City, became a New York City designated landmark in 2016.

The building contains setbacks to comply with the 1916 Zoning Resolution; at the time of its construction, the Shelton was quoted as the world's tallest hotel. The first two stories of the facade are clad with limestone, while the upper stories are faced with grayish-brown brick, interspersed with terracotta and limestone trim. When it opened, the hotel featured numerous amenities similar to those in a clubhouse, such as a gymnasium, a bowling alley, Victorian-style Turkish baths, a swimming pool, a barber, squash courts, and billiard tables. The upper stories originally contained 1,200 rooms, which was decreased to about 650 rooms in the late 1970s, as well as outdoor terraces on the 15th and 31st floors. The Shelton Hotel was widely praised by architectural critics upon its completion. Its design has been cited as an influence for that of other structures, such as the Empire State Building.

Lee acquired the site in 1922 from the International Sporting Club, which had unsuccessfully attempted to build a clubhouse there. The hotel was completed in January 1924 as a men-only hostelry and opened to women later that year; it attracted tenants such as Alfred Stieglitz and Georgia O'Keeffe. The New York Life Insurance Company acquired the hotel in 1935, and the Knott Management Corporation took over the hotel's operation, buying it in 1946. The hotel was sold multiple times in the 1950s. Sol Goldman and Alex DiLorenzo Jr. bought the hotel in the 1960s and leased it to Stanley Stahl, who closed the hotel in May 1971. Tishman Realty & Construction planned to build a skyscraper on the site in the 1970s but canceled its plans after several holdout tenants refused to relocate. The contractor Edward Halloran acquired the hotel in 1976 and renovated it into the Halloran House, a Howard Johnson's hotel. Marriott Hotels & Resorts took over the hotel in 1990 and operated it until 2020, when the hotel closed as a result of the COVID-19 pandemic. Hawkins Way Capital and Värde Partners bought the building in early 2023 and renovated it into a student housing facility, FOUND Study Turtle Bay, which opened that September.

== Site ==
525 Lexington Avenue is on the eastern side of Lexington Avenue, on the southeast corner with 49th Street, in the Midtown Manhattan neighborhood of New York City. It sits on the western portion of a city block bounded by Lexington Avenue to the west, 49th Street to the north, Third Avenue to the east, and 48th Street to the south. The hotel occupies an irregular land lot with an area of 22,422 ft^{2} (2,083.1 m^{2}); the eastern portion of the lot extends southward to 48th Street. The site has a frontage of 140.42 ft (42.80 m) on Lexington Avenue, 145 ft (44 m) on 49th Street, and 40 ft (12 m) wide on 48th Street.

525 Lexington Avenue wraps around another building at the northeast corner of 48th Street and Lexington Avenue (which was completed around 2009), and it abuts a public plaza to the southeast. When the Shelton was constructed, the corner lot contained a three-story brick building, which was destroyed in 1939. The hotel is across from 277 Park Avenue to the southwest, the InterContinental New York Barclay Hotel and 299 Park Avenue to the west, the Waldorf Astoria New York to the northwest, and the Lexington Hotel NYC to the south. The Shelton was part of "Hotel Row", a collection of hotels developed along Lexington Avenue in the early 20th century. The surrounding section of Lexington Avenue from 42nd to 52nd Street did not experience significant development until the late 19th century, when row houses and tenements, made of brick and brownstone, were developed in the area.

== Architecture ==
525 Lexington Avenue was designed by Arthur Loomis Harmon, who went on to design the Empire State Building and 500 Fifth Avenue. The hotel was originally known as the Shelton, an apartment hotel, and was developed by James T. Lee, grandfather of Jacqueline Kennedy Onassis. The hotel contains elements of the Lombard Revival style, although Harmon wanted to avoid clear allusion to any specific architectural style, saying that "the masses of such modern buildings have no architectural precedence". Christopher Gray of The New York Times wrote that Harmon "covered the mass with irregular yellowy-tan brick, roughened as if centuries old, and for details, drew from Romanesque, Byzantine, early Christian, Lombard and other styles." The hotel's developer described the building as being designed in a "North Italian Romanesque or Early Christian" style.

=== Form ===
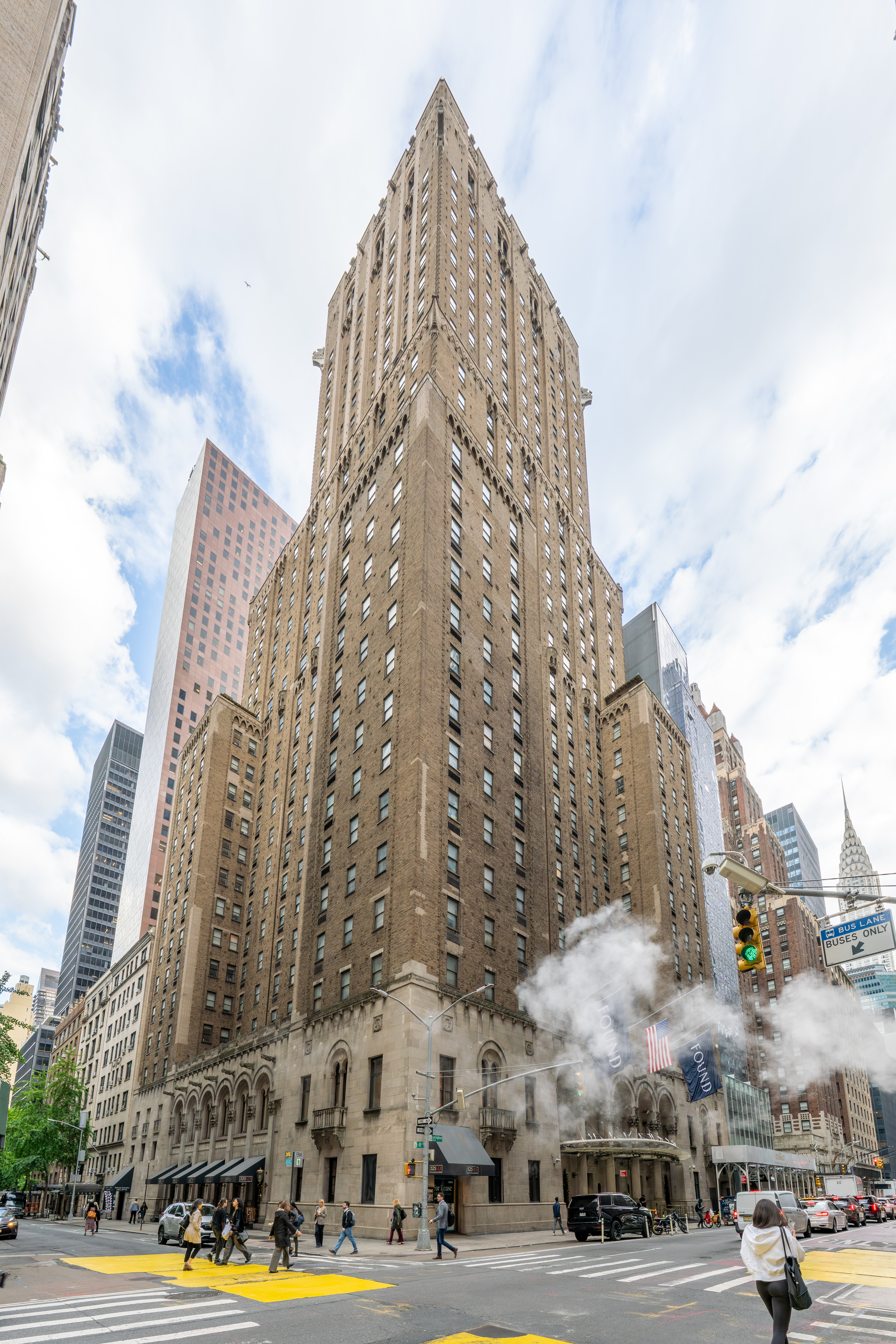
The building viewed from Lexington Avenue

The hotel building contains setbacks to comply with the 1916 Zoning Resolution; it was one of the first major hotels in New York City to be developed after the resolution was enacted. At the time of its construction, the Shelton was also quoted as the world's tallest hotel; modern sources cite the hotel as being 387 feet (118 m) tall, although a source from 1932 gave an alternate height of 412 ft (126 m). The building is variously cited as being 31, 32, 34, or 35 stories tall. This discrepancy arises from the fact that the hotel's floor numbering system does not have a thirteenth floor, as well as the fact that there is a three-story mechanical penthouse above the primary 31-story roof. Including the penthouse, the hotel has a total of 34 floors.

According to art historian Anna C. Chave, Harmon preferred that the hotel's setbacks "be boldly articulated in architectural form, not camouflaged by ornamentation". To maximize the size of the public amenity space, the lowest two stories of 525 Lexington Avenue occupy the entire site. On the first 15 stories of the hotel, a 40 ft-wide (12 m) wing runs south to 48th Street from the center of the main structure's southern elevation. The wing on 48th Street contains a setback on its rear above the first story, as well as on its front above the second story. At the 3rd story, the eastern elevation sets back into an elongated light court, giving the building a roughly U-shaped plan. The northern elevation on 49th Street and the western elevation on Lexington Avenue also have light courts, which are shallower and are flanked by projecting pavilions. Another light court exists on the eastern elevation.

The hotel has further setbacks at the 15th and 21st floors; the main roof is above the 31st floor. To comply with the 1916 Zoning Resolution, the top stories of the hotel only occupy one-quarter of the entire lot. The hotel is topped by a set-back penthouse with a pyramidal hip roof.

=== Facade ===
All four elevations of the hotel's facade are visible from the street and are accordingly decorated. The first two stories of the facade are clad with limestone. The upper stories are faced with grayish-brown brick, interspersed with terracotta and limestone trim. The third through 14th stories, and the 16th to 30th stories, have windows that illuminate guestrooms inside. The 15th and 31st stories are designed in a different manner because these stories originally contained amenity areas.

The facade is divided vertically into multiple bays, which alternately project from the facade or are recessed from it. On the upper stories, projecting bricks were arranged both in vertical lines and in random patterns. Harmon, seeking to emphasize the hotel's height, avoided including horizontal lines in the hotel's design where possible. The facade's design followed the principle of entasis, bulging slightly outward so as to not give the impression that the hotel was sagging, The lower stories were sloped slightly inward, further emphasizing the building's height. The original design was modified significantly in 1935. The modern-day facade, which dates to a 1977–1978 renovation, is similar to the original design but has additional doorways and windows.

==== Base ====
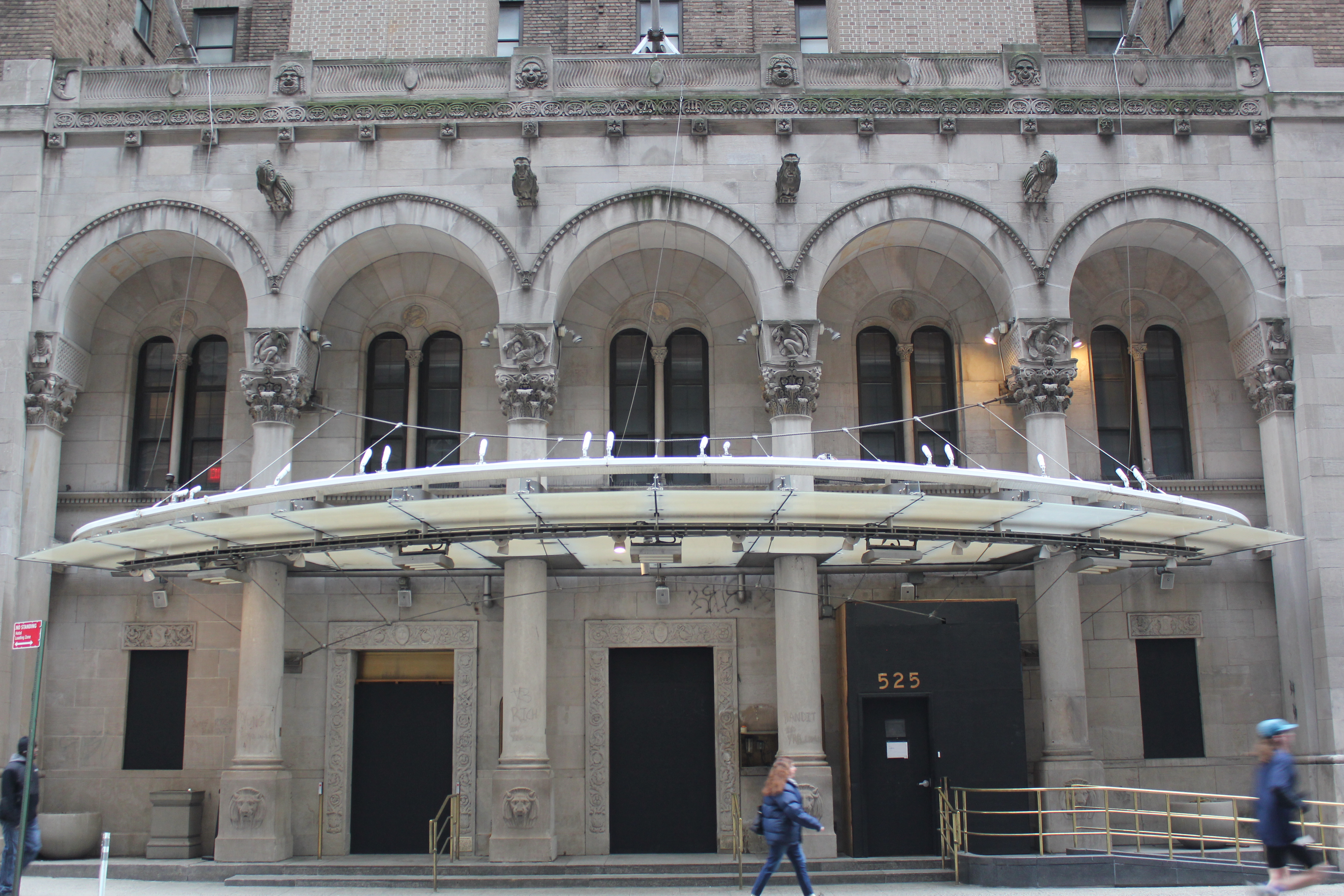
Arcade at the center of the Lexington Avenue facade

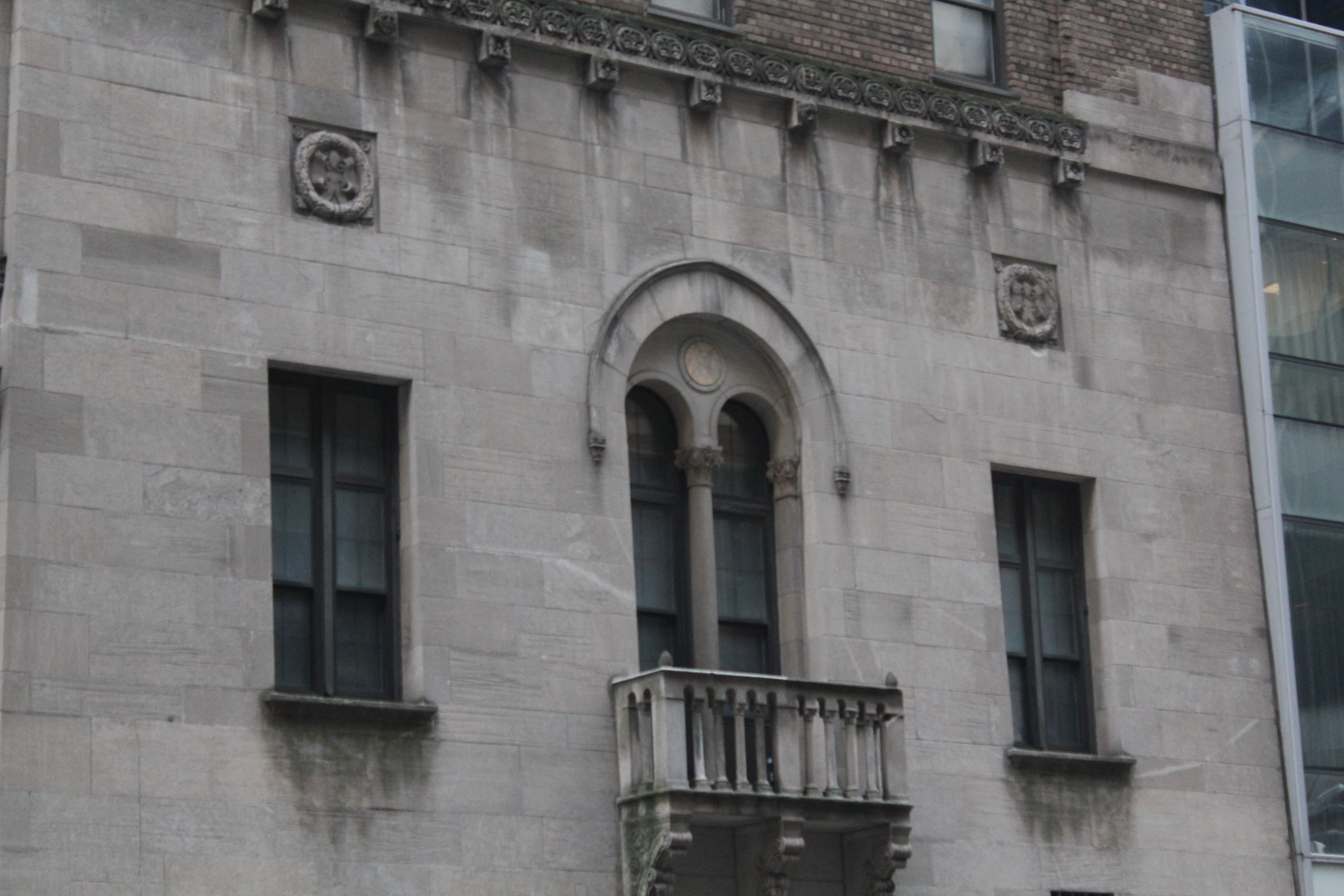
Arched windows on the second floor of the Lexington Avenue facade's outer pavilions

The 49th Street and Lexington Avenue elevations of the facade have double-height arcades at the base. The Lexington Avenue facade contains a loggia of five arches in the center of the facade, as well as a glass-and-metal canopy that curves outward. The arches are flanked by pedestals with lion heads, which support Corinthian columns. Above the columns are impost blocks, which contain depictions of readers and athletes carved in relief, as well as molded archivolts and gargoyles. In addition, a cornice with corbels runs horizontally above the second floor, topped by a parapet that contains reliefs of masks. The three center archways lead into the lobby and are surrounded by doorways with Renaissance-style arabesques. There are arched niches in between each of the center doorways. On the second story, each of the five center bays contains a pair of arched windows.

The Lexington Avenue entrance is flanked by three-bay-wide projecting pavilions. The first story originally had rectangular window openings, though one window in each pavilion has since been replaced by a doorway. The southernmost bay of the south pavilion contains an entrance with a projecting granite doorway. At the second floor, the center bay of each pavilion contains a pair of arched windows and a balcony supported by brackets (these bays originally contained French windows). The other bays have simple rectangular windows on the second floor, above which are relief panels with scrolls and wreaths, which are inset into the facade. A cornice, with corbels shaped like masks and flowers, runs above the second story of each pavilion. Over the years, objects such as air-conditioner openings, storage cabinet, a security camera, and flagpoles have been added at the base.

The 49th Street facade is similar in arrangement to that along Lexington Avenue, with a recessed arcade flanked by pavilions. The arcade is six bays wide; the westernmost bay of the arcade contains an entrance. There are awnings above the first-story windows in each bay of the arcade, and a low iron railing runs in front of the arcade's first-floor windows. Above the first story, the arcade contains are chevron patterns consisting of light and dark stone. The eastern pavilion contains square-headed windows on its mezzanine level, while the windows on the first and second story have been sealed. A stone balustrade runs above the arcade's second story and is decorated with quatrefoil tracery.

On the 48th Street wing, the southern elevation is clad with limestone in multiple hues. At the first and second stories, the facade of the wing is divided into three bays; the center bay is divided into four windows, while the side bays have two windows each. On the first story, the center window is topped by a lunette, and there is a door in the westernmost bay; all of the windows have tracery and stone mullions. The wing's second story contains a terrace recessed behind the windows on that story. The main section of the building, closer to 49th Street, contains arched windows on its southern elevation at the second story; these windows originally illuminated the hotel's library. A concrete-clad annex, consisting of the first story and mezzanine, extends into the courtyard at the hotel's southeast corner; this annex contains ventilation grates and HVAC equipment on its roof.

==== Upper stories ====
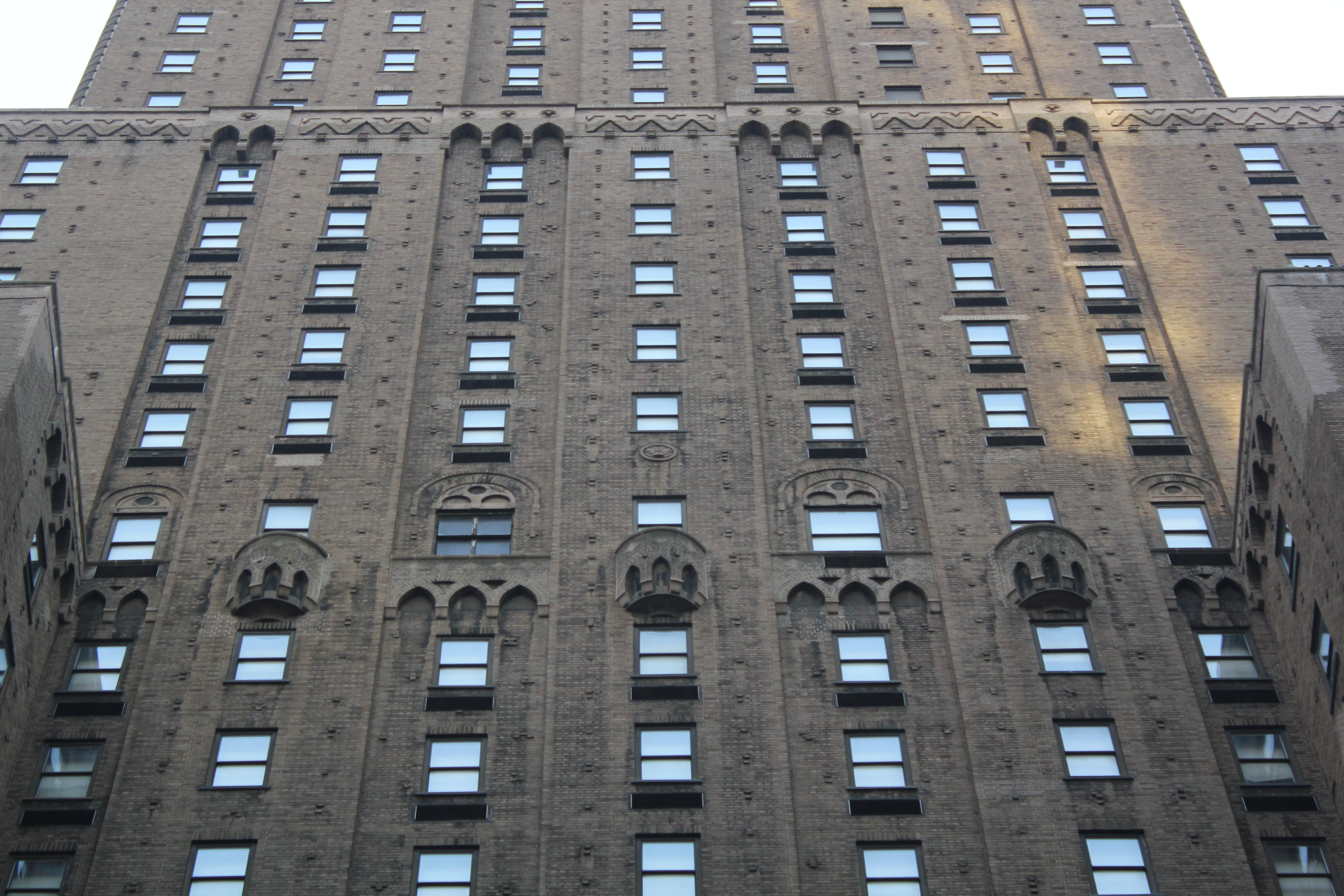
Upper stories of the Lexington Avenue facade

On the upper stories, some of the brickwork and the majority of the windows have been replaced, and the facade also contains openings for air-conditioning units. Along 49th Street and Lexington Avenue, on the 3rd through 14th floors, the facade contains random projecting bricks scattered amid the windows. The projecting brick patterns were arranged so as to "avoid any effect of a pattern", according to Architecture magazine, although they repeat at three-story intervals. The center bays alternately project from or are recessed into the facade; these bays vary in depth by 10 ft (3.0 m). On the 15th story, the outer bays contain arched corbel tables, as well as parapets with inlaid rhombuses, above which are pergolas and brick-and-glass structures. On that story recessed center bays contain arched corbel tables, and the projecting center bays contain round balconies; above the 15th story windows, there are rosettes made of terracotta. There is a parapet at the 21st story with arched corbel tables, corbels, and chevrons; this parapet has been repaired over the years.

On the 21st to 30th stories, the bays alternately project from or are recessed into the facade. The recessed center bays contain smaller windows than the projecting bays and are topped by arched corbel tables. The corners of the building contain colonettes with fiberglass griffins, which are intended to resemble the original griffins. The 31st story is a double-height space with both projecting and recessed bays; the recessed bays contain double-height arched windows, while the projecting bays contain projecting bricks. At the 31st story, the center bays also contain projecting gargoyles, while the outer bays contain small attic windows. In addition, the roofline of the 31st story contains grotesques of bears, which appear to be holding amphorae.

The upper stories of the 48th Street wing's southern elevation are designed very similarly to the corner pavilions on Lexington Avenue and 49th Street. The wing's eastern elevation and part of the western elevation are also visible; these elevations consist of plain brick walls with windows. At the 15th-story setback is a brick parapet with limestone coping, as well as a brick pavilion with a hip roof. The eastern and southern elevations of the main building also contain plain walls, which are visible from 48th Street and from Third Avenue. As with the other elevations, some of the brickwork and windows have been replaced; in addition, some windows on these elevations have been sealed. Several steel trusses span the light court on the eastern elevation, and the 15th story also contains a bridge across the light court, connecting the northern and southern wings.

=== Interior ===
When it opened, the hotel featured numerous "club" amenities, such as a gymnasium, a bowling alley, a Victorian-style Turkish bath, a swimming pool, a barber, squash courts, and billiard tables. The hotel contained six passenger and two freight elevators. In contrast to the Shelton's exterior, which was distinctive for its time, the interior was similar to that of other contemporary large hotels. As of 2016, the hotel had a gross floor area of 391,318 ft^{2} (36,354.6 m^{2}). The hotel's amenities included a fitness center measuring 1,000 ft^{2} (93 m^{2}); meeting space totaling 16,000 ft^{2} (1,500 m^{2}); and the 525LEX Restaurant and Lounge.

==== Public rooms and amenities ====
Original floor plans for lower floors

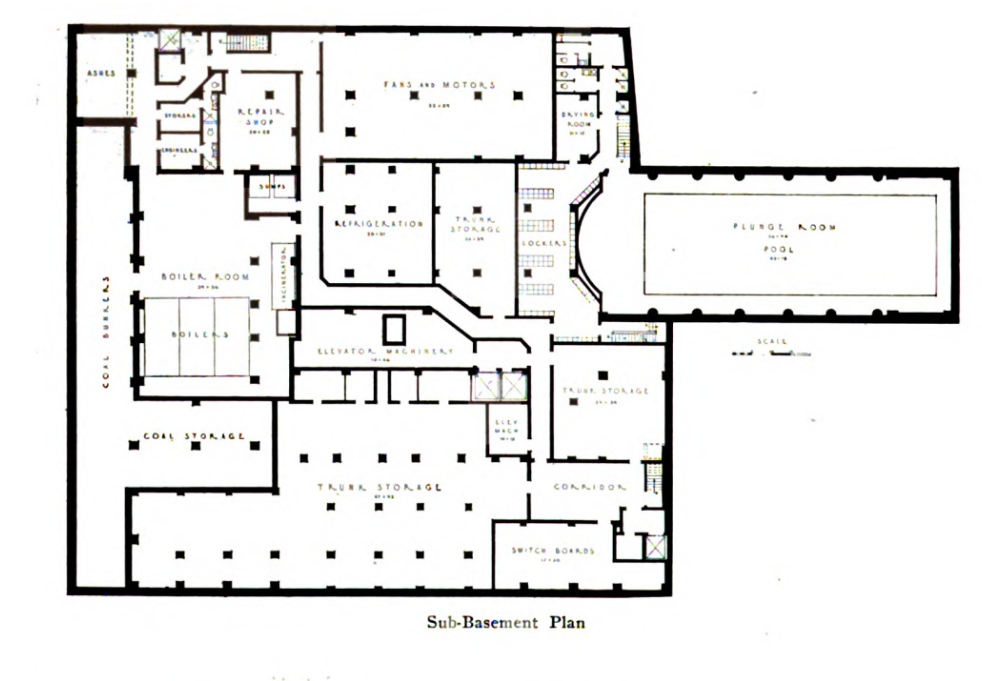
Sub-basement

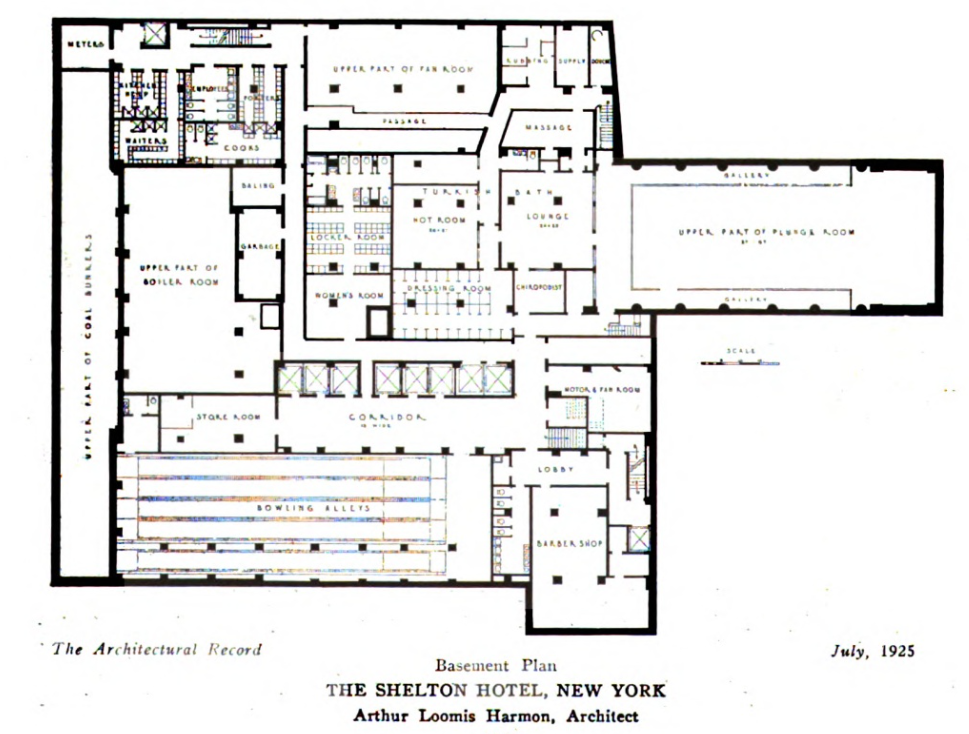
Basement

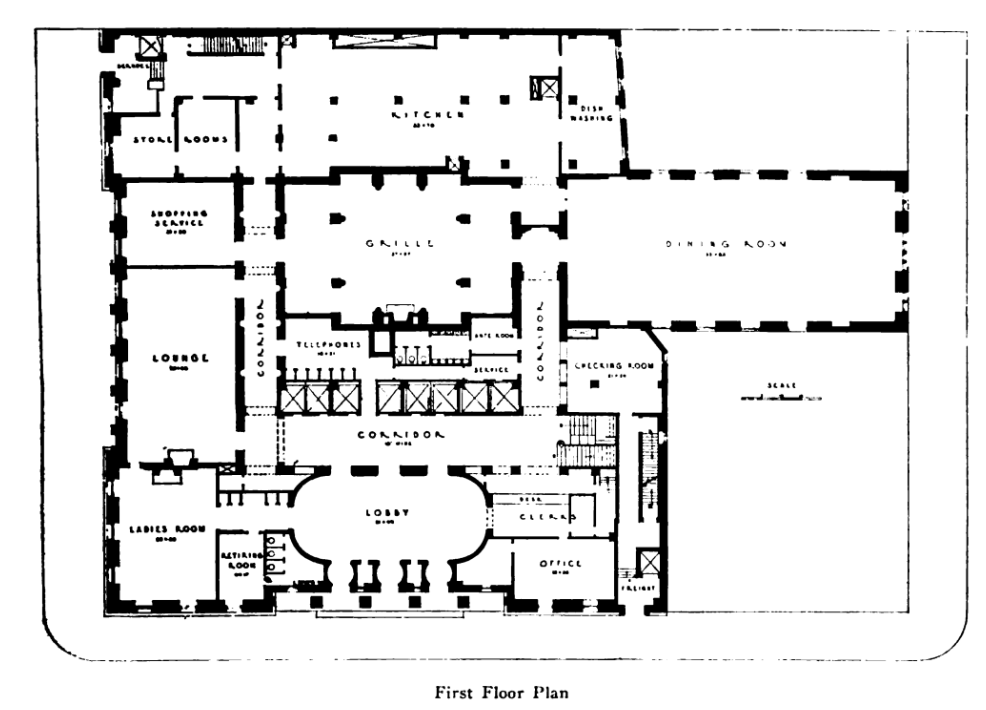
First floor

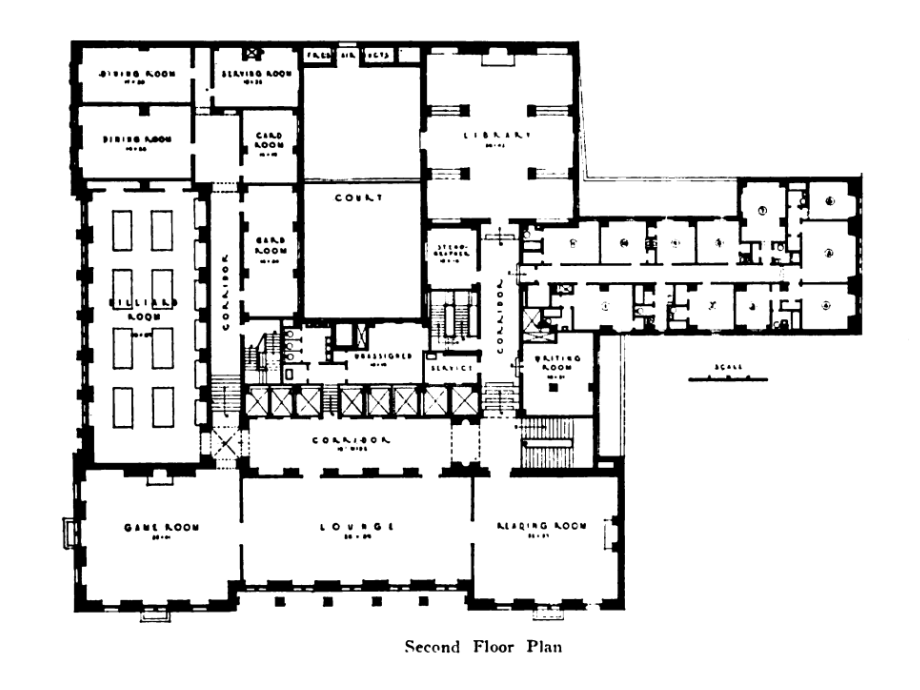
Second floor

The Shelton's public rooms were largely designed with early Italian Renaissance elements, except the wood-paneled rooms, which were influenced more by English architecture. The sub-basement contained the pool, clothing-storage, and boiler rooms. The basement contained a mezzanine surrounding the pool, as well as a Turkish bath, bowling alley, barber shop, and servant's rooms. The pool's mezzanine was decorated with multicolored tile. By the 2000s, the original swimming pool had been drained and divided into three sections, although a ladder remained in place at one corner.

At ground level was the kitchen, grill, and dining room. The entrance lobby on Lexington Avenue connected with an office to the south, a baggage entrance and women's lounge to the north, and a lounge to the east. The restaurant was originally located in the 48th Street wing, while the grill was placed behind the elevators to the east. The kitchen was at the far east end of the hotel, behind the grill. A grill and café was added on the 49th Street side of the ground level in 1935. The grill and café contained entrances from 49th Street and Lexington Avenue; the grill was designed in a 17th-century style, while the café had a semicircular mahogany bar. In addition, there was a dining room accessed from Lexington Avenue. Most of the original interior has been heavily modified over the years, but some remnants of the original design remained in the late 2000s, including a stair hall next to the lobby.

On the second story was a suite of three rooms facing Lexington Avenue: the reading room to the north, the lounge in the center, and the game room to the south. The billiard room was on the north end of the elevator lobby, and two west–east corridors ran across the second floor, The corridor on the north side of the second floor led to various card rooms and dining rooms, while the corridor on the south side connected to the library and dining rooms. The hotel's library reportedly contained over 12,000 volumes. By the 2000s, the hotel also had 19 meeting rooms.

The hotel contained a solarium and open terrace on the 15th floor. The solarium was placed above the rooftop terrace on the southern wing. The center of the 15th story contained two "baronial suites", with paneled living rooms that contained fireplaces, as well as private porches and sunroofs. The 15th-floor setback also contained open-air terraces for tenants. The top story, was devoted to a gymnasium and three squash courts; there was also a gallery for exhibition matches. By the 2000s, the squash courts had been replaced by the hotel's fitness center. The roof contained a penthouse for tanks, elevator machinery, and other equipment.

==== Guestrooms ====
The hotel originally had either 1,100 or 1,200 bedrooms, approximately two-thirds of which had their own bathrooms. The third to 14th floors largely consisted of single rooms, but the corners of these stories had two-bedroom suites. Above the 15th floor, the Shelton had ten floors of bedrooms. A New York Times article from 1928 cited the hotel as having 1,169 guestrooms and 600 bathrooms. By 1954, three of the hotel's stories (comprising a total of 180 rooms) were used as offices.

By the 2000s, the hotel included 646 rooms, which were composed of 629 standard rooms and 17 suites. After the 2007 renovation, Oyster.com wrote that the average room was 175 ft^{2} (16.3 m^{2}), enough to accommodate a king size bed, chair, desk, and side table. In addition, the guestrooms were decorated in a yellow, mustard, or scarlet palette, similar to other Marriott hotels, while the bathrooms had granite alcoves for toiletries. By 2016, the hotel had 655 guestrooms.

== History ==
The construction of Grand Central Terminal began in 1903 on the site of Grand Central Depot, following a fatal crash in the Park Avenue Tunnel, the only approach to the depot, the preceding year. Grand Central Terminal opened on February 2, 1913. Passenger traffic on the commuter lines into Grand Central more than doubled in the years following the terminal's completion. The terminal spurred development in the surrounding area, particularly in Terminal City, a commercial and office district created above where the tracks were covered. Terminal City soon became Manhattan's most desirable commercial and office district. A 1920 New York Times article said, "With its hotels, office buildings, apartments and underground Streets it not only is a wonderful railroad terminal, but also a great civic centre." The Shelton was one of several hotels developed in Terminal City, along with other hostelries such as the Barclay, Commodore, Roosevelt, and Biltmore.

Meanwhile, during the early 19th century, apartment developments in the city were generally associated with the working class. By the late 19th century, apartments were also becoming desirable among the middle and upper classes. Between 1880 and 1885, more than ninety apartment buildings were developed in the city. Apartment hotels in New York City became more popular after World War I, particularly among wealthy people who wanted to live luxuriously but also wanted to do some of their own housework, such as cooking. Developers of apartment hotels sometimes constructed developments to bypass the Tenement House Law, which prevented new apartment buildings from being taller than 150 percent of the width of the adjacent street. Apartment hotels had less stringent regulations on sunlight, ventilation, and emergency stairs but had to contain communal spaces like dining rooms.

=== Development ===
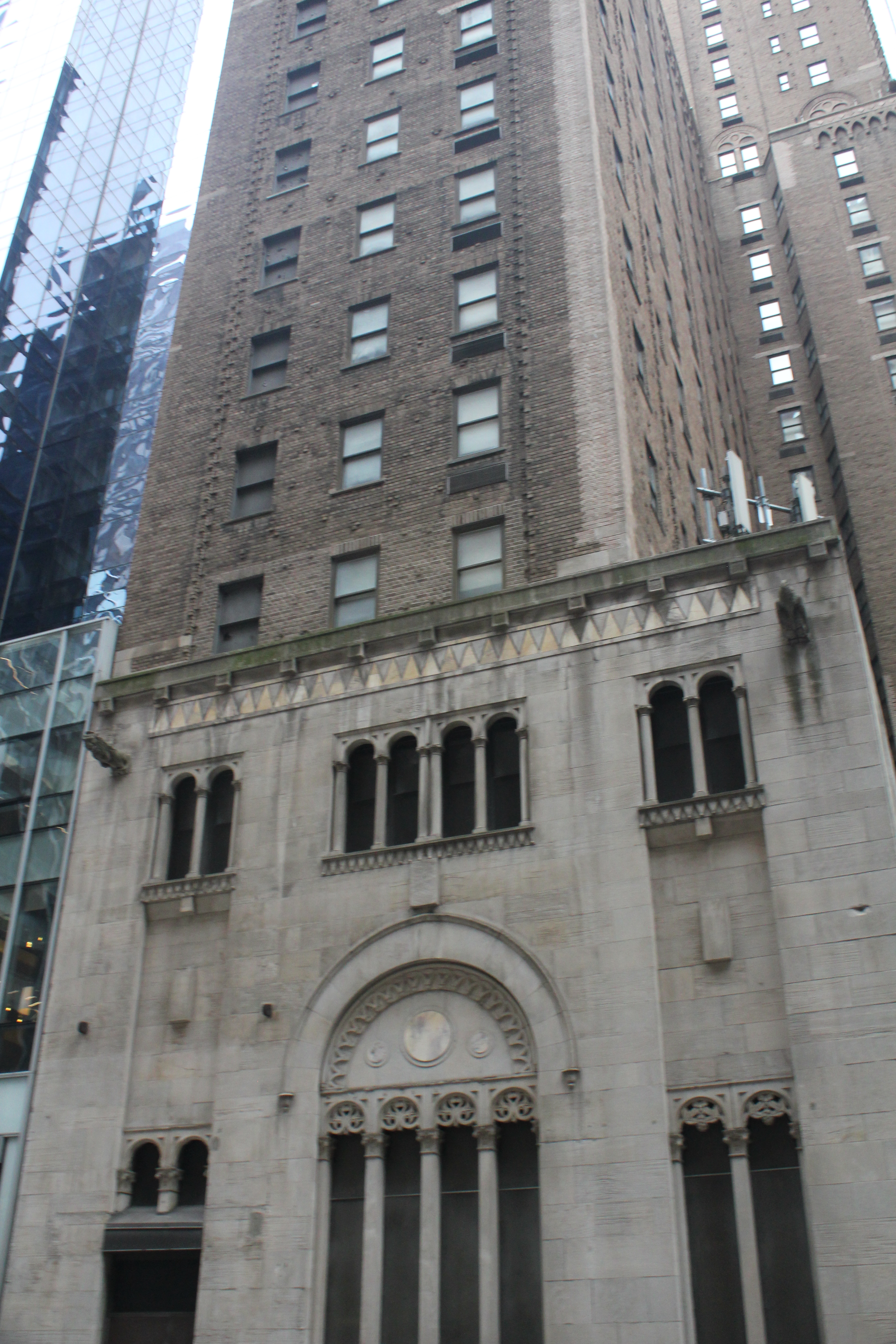
Window on 48th Street wing

The International Sporting Club (ISC) had announced plans in December 1919 for a sporting arena and clubhouse at the southeast corner of 49th Street and Lexington Avenue. The existing buildings on the site had been demolished by 1921, when the ISC's founder disappeared with a large proportion of the club's assets. Subsequently, in January 1922, a judge scheduled an auction for the site, and James T. Lee acquired the plot the same month. Lee initially planned to develop a 15-story apartment hotel for men on the ISC site.

The Shelton Holding Corporation, headed by Lee, announced in March 1922 that it would build a 30-story apartment hotel instead. The hotel was to be known as the Shelton Club and was one of several hotels in New York City being developed at the time with a combined 6,000 rooms. Lee intended for the Shelton to be a high-end apartment hotel, describing it as "equal in appointments to the Yale Club" building at 50 Vanderbilt Avenue. Residents would rent the apartments monthly, rather than staying overnight or signing long-term leases. Work on clearing the site had started by May 1922, after S. W. Straus & Co. placed a $4 million bond issue on the hotel. Harmon filed plans for a 31-story hotel on the site later the same month at an estimated cost of $3 million to $5 million.

Lee wanted to offset the hotel's relatively high construction costs by increasing the building's height, which in turn would allow him to rent the apartments to more people. Furthermore, the higher construction costs of the top stories would be counterbalanced by the high rents that the upper-floor apartments would attract. According to Architecture magazine, the utility costs for a 1,200-room hotel were only slightly higher than those for a 600-room hotel, and the various public rooms were also supposed to attract guests, Construction of the hotel itself commenced in August 1922. The Shelton was partially open by late 1923 and had been completed by March 1924. Following the Shelton's completion, other hotels in the area, such as the Lexington and Waldorf Astoria, were also constructed.

=== Early operation ===
==== 1920s to 1940s ====
As a bachelor hotel, the Shelton originally catered solely to men. In September 1924, the hotel announced that it would admit women after the vast majority of the hotel's tenants voted in favor of it. According to The New York Herald, New York Tribune, although many of the residents favored retaining men-only clubrooms, "when it came to the hotel dining rooms, salons and the library and card rooms they missed the dash of color". The first female guests checked into the Shelton that October, and the hotel's 75-foot-long swimming pool opened the next month. The swimming pool hosted the Hotel Shelton Dolphins, a women's swim team, and it was also used for meets by the AAU Women's Swimming Association. After five companies established the Continental-Leland Corporation in 1925, the Shelton became the flagship hotel of the corporation; James T. Lee was the president of the corporation. Hughes & Hammond placed a $4 million, ten-year mortgage loan on the hotel in 1928; this mortgage loan replaced a $4.25 million bond issue that was placed circa 1924.

The Knott Management Corporation took over the Shelton Hotel's operation in March 1935. That September, the Knotts announced a $65,000 renovation of the hotel, which would be designed by Charles F. Winkleman. As part of the project, the Pompeiian room (which had been the hotel's café) was converted into a lounge, and the lounges on 49th Street were converted into a grill and cocktail room. In October 1935, the New York Life Insurance Company took over the Shelton at a foreclosure auction, bidding $300,000 and assuming the hotel's $3.64 million mortgage. The Knott Corporation managed the hotel on behalf of New York Life, and it operated an entertainment venue at the hotel, the Shelton Corner.

The Shelton remained popular in the 1940s, when it hosted civic meetings and other events. The hotel's advertisements praised its amenities, the affordable prices of the restaurant's meals, the live music at the Shelton Corner, and the proximity to Grand Central Terminal. Guests could pay nightly or weekly fees to use the rooms, or they could sign long-term leases. The American Contract Bridge League also hosted tournaments at the Shelton, where a contract bridge club had leased a 15th-story lounge. In March 1946, the Knott Corporation bought the building from New York Life through the Charles F. Noyes Company for $3.35 million. The Noyes Company then arranged a $3 million mortgage for the hotel. Knott converted some space on the 15th floor to offices in the late 1940s, renting the space to tenants such as a wedding planner, the publisher Public Relations Society of America, and a photography company.

==== 1950s and 1960s ====
The Knott Corporation sold the hotel in April 1951 to Louis Schleifer, at which point the hotel was assessed at $4 million. Schleifer took title to the building in August 1951, with plans to keep it as an investment, and Joseph Wolf became the hotel's manager. Schleifer leased the hotel in March 1952 to Herbert R. Weissberg of 523-527 Lexington Inc. for 21 years at $500,000 per year. Less than a year later, in February 1953, Lawrence A. Wien bought the hotel from Schleifer. The Fink brothers acquired all of the stock in the Hotel Equities Company, which had a long-term lease on the building in August 1954. The Finks planned to spend $500,000 on renovating the hotel, including the pool, baths, gymnasium, lobby, dining rooms, assembly rooms, and guestrooms. By then, Buster Crabbe operated the hotel's swimming pool and health club, and about three stories of the hotel had been converted to office space. The ballroom was closed in December 1956 and turned into a laboratory for color-film processing company Authenticolor.

Jay and Arthur Wells, representing Wells Television Inc., signed a contract to buy the hotel's lease in April 1957. The next month, they hired a syndicate led by Sidney Bressler to operate the hotel, which was renamed the Shelton Towers. Vic Tanny leased the hotel's pool in early 1958. Westchester County judge George A. Brenner, one of the investors who had leased the hotel, spent large sums of money on renovating the Shelton Towers but was unable to obtain more funding. New York County district attorney Frank Hogan indicted Brenner on charges of forgery in January 1959. Hogan claimed that Brenner had leased the hotel for 14 years with plans to renovate it, obtain a 75-year lease, and resell it to a large hotel chain. The district attorney's office accused Brenner of trying to submit a falsified certificate, worth $250,000, at a Westchester bank in an attempt to receive a loan for the hotel. The Shelton Towers' manager, convicted forger William M. Singer, was detained in connection with the case. Brenner, Singer, and their former secretary Norma M. Bucher all pleaded guilty to conspiracy and fraud charges in early 1960; Singer and Bucher were sentenced to between 18 and 24 months in prison, while Brenner was sentenced to between four and seven years.

The S. T. Hotel Corporation (which held the Shelton Towers' lease) decided to sublet the hotel in December 1959 to Max Klein's Shelton East Corporation, which planned to renovate the hotel. By the 1960s, according to the New York City Landmarks Preservation Commission (LPC), the hotel "was increasingly regarded as passé". Wellington Associates, led by Sol Goldman and Alex DiLorenzo Jr., bought the hotel in the 1960s. Wellington Associates received a $2.3 million first mortgage loan for the hotel in 1965 and a $1.5 million second mortgage the following year. Goldman and DiLorenzo received a $12.5 million, five-year mortgage loan for the Shelton and two nearby plots in 1968. The hotel's swimming pool and gym, operated by Shelton Health Clubs, saw 2,000 customers per day by the late 1960s. In addition, the hotel's ground level contained a nightclub until 1967; originally known as La Vie en Rose, the club was renamed Casa Cugat in 1958 and Basin Street East in 1959.

=== Proposed redevelopment ===
==== Skyscraper plan ====
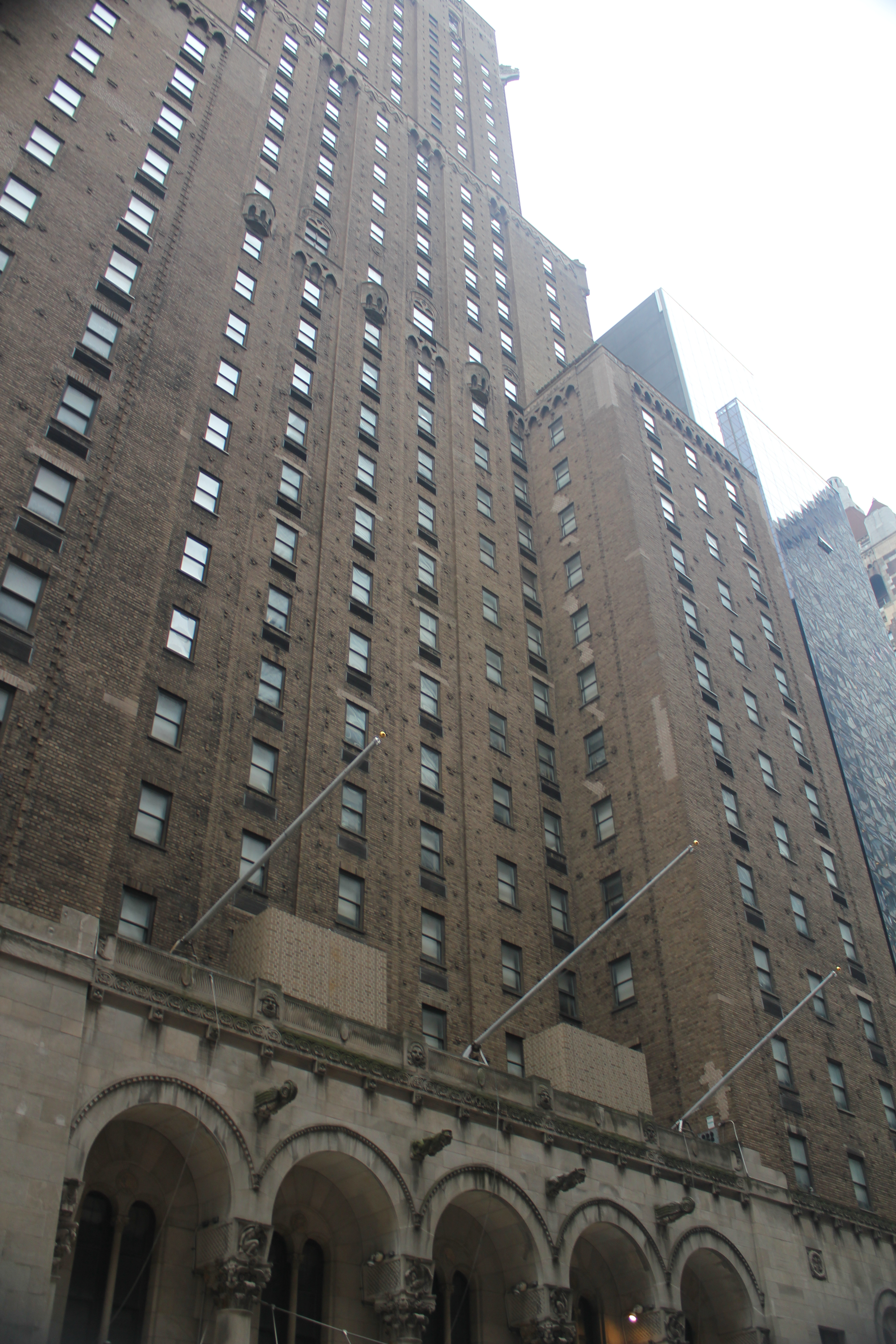
View of the Lexington Avenue facade from ground level

By October 1965, Goldman and DiLorenzo had acquired five smaller structures and a parking lot on the same block, with plans to redevelop the site. Goldman and DiLorenzo eventually acquired the entire block, covering 64,000 ft^{2} (5,900 m^{2}). The partners had initially leased 44,000 ft^{2} (4,100 m^{2}) on the west side of the block, including the Shelton's site, to Stanley Stahl. Stahl planned to replace all buildings on the block with a skyscraper occupied by a large corporation. Telephone company GTE initially agreed to lease space in the new skyscraper, but it ultimately opted to move to Connecticut instead. Tishman Realty and Construction took over the lease, with plans to develop to build a 1.5×10^{6} ft^{2} (140,000 m^{2}) structure. Tishman, Arlen Properties, and Bahamian fund Gramco International created a joint venture in 1970 to construct the Third Avenue skyscraper, as well as a 44-story building at 1166 Avenue of the Americas, for a combined $200 million.

Citadel Management Co. took over as the hotel's landlord in 1971. Stahl announced in May 1971 that the hotel would no longer accept overnight guests because it was "losing a lot of money", although long-term guests would be allowed to stay for at least six months. At the time, room-occupancy rates in New York City's hotels were declining. Tishman razed the buildings on Third Avenue, but could not proceed further until existing tenants had been relocated. The New York Telephone Company agreed to lease 500,000 ft^{2} (46,000 m^{2}) in the proposed building on the condition that all of the hotel's existing residents be relocated, but Tishman was unable to relocate the remaining tenants. Tishman then proposed constructing two smaller buildings, one each on Third Avenue and Lexington Avenue, separated by a park; this plan was also controversial. Concurrently, the Metropolitan Transportation Authority considered developing a terminal for the Long Island Rail Road on the site as part of its Program for Action. The city government rejected Tishman's plan for a 52-story skyscraper in June 1974.

By the mid-1970s, the Shelton had 26 tenants, all of whom lived in rent-controlled units. Some of the residents agreed to relocate and were each paid between $15,000 and $17,000. The 11 remaining tenants sued Tishman in July 1974, accusing Citadel of neglecting the building by failing to replace a broken boiler in the basement. Tishman sold the eastern quarter of the site to New York Telephone in October 1974. The hotel's tenants remained in place, and the other buildings on the block contained about 100 tenants in total.

==== Cancellation ====
In December 1975, Tishman officially canceled its plans for the tower and relinquished the site to Avon Associates, a firm operated by Goldman and the DiLorenzo estate. According to Tishman's president Robert Tishman, the project was no longer financially viable due to the 1975 New York City fiscal crisis and the presence of the holdout tenants. The company had spent $3 million to maintain the Shelton Towers during fiscal year 1975; some of this money was used to pay the salaries of 11 staff members and a 24-hour security detail for the remaining tenants. Except for a middle-aged secretary, all of the remaining tenants were elderly; six of the eight holdouts were women.

Tishman paid Goldman and the DiLorenzo estate $1.8 million, and Goldman and DiLorenzo transferred the hotel's title to the Dollar Savings Bank. The bank, in turn, would cover the hotel's expenses, which included $225,000 in annual taxes and up to $5,000 in monthly heating costs. Tishman had sold all of the remaining buildings on the block by October 1976. After the Dollar Savings Bank reacquired the hotel, it hired the firm of Stephen B. Jacobs and Associates to study the feasibility of converting the Shelton to residential apartments.

=== Halloran House ===
Contractor Edward "Biff" Halloran bought a purchase option for the hotel in July 1976; the option allowed Halloran to pay $11 million for the Shelton if he could relocate the eight holdouts and sign an agreement with a "Class A hotel" by the beginning of September. At the time, Halloran was negotiating to operate the hotel as a franchise of Holiday Inn. The Shelton's remaining tenants quickly agreed to relocate after Halloran offered to give them free rent for the rest of their lives. The New York Daily News reported in October 1976 that a "West Coast-based syndicate" was in the process of buying the hotel. The city's Industrial and Commercial Incentive Board approved a tax abatement for the project, which was expected to cost $21 million, in February 1977. That April, the Starrett Corporation received a $6.4 million contract to renovate the hotel into a 650-room Howard Johnson's.

Halloran renovated the hotel in collaboration with Norman Groh, who had received a franchise from Howard Johnson's. Jacobs was hired as the restoration architect, while George Clarkson was employed as the interior designer. The Shelton's renovation occurred amid an increase in occupancy rates at New York City's hotels, which had an occupancy rate of 90 percent by 1978. As part of the project, the hotel's facade was restored, while its interiors were updated to meet modern building codes. According to Jacobs, the Shelton cost less than $30,000 per room to renovate, while a new hotel of similar size would have cost over $100,000 per room. The hotel reopened in November 1978, shortly after Thanksgiving, and Mary Diem was appointed as the hotel's manager in January 1979.

The Attorney General of New York filed an antitrust lawsuit against several of Halloran's companies in 1984, including the companies that operated the Halloran House. According to the attorney general's office, the hotel's operators had acted as guarantors for Halloran's other companies, which allegedly held a monopoly on ready mixed concrete in New York City. At the end of December 1984, Halloran sold the hotel to 525 Lexington Avenue Associates, which was partly controlled by Morris Bailey. 525 Lexington Ave. Associates planned to rename the hotel, renovate the rooms, and add a health club, although they continued to operate the Halloran House as a Howard Johnson franchise. Halloran used the proceeds from the hotel's sale to pay back one of his lenders, the Marine Midland Bank, in what the Manhattan District Attorney's office later described as a check kiting scheme. 525 Lexington Ave. Associates renovated the hotel again between 1988 and 1989, adding air-conditioners in each room, as well as replacing many windows. The renovation overran its budget by 12 percent.

=== Marriott operation ===
==== 1990s ====
After the late-1980s renovation, Bailey had wanted to sell the hotel for about $300,000 per room, although few potential buyers were willing to pay that price. By then, little remained of the hotel's original interior. Marriott Hotels & Resorts, which wanted to operate a hotel on the East Side of Manhattan, agreed to pay Bailey $13 million, allowing Bailey and his partners to cover the cost overruns of the project. The Halloran House became the New York Marriott East Side, the second Marriott-branded hotel in Manhattan, after the New York Marriott Marquis near Times Square. Marriott operated the hotel under lease for several years.

525 Lexington Avenue Associates filed for Chapter 11 bankruptcy protection in 1994, and Marriott's parent company Host Marriott, in conjunction with Morris Bailey, bought the hotel the same year. Host Marriott and Bailey paid $55 million for the hotel, which amounted to $82,800 per room. By 1996, Marriott was planning to spend $45 million refurbishing the Marriott East Side. Host Marriott sold the hotel to Strategic Hotel Capital Inc. in April 1998 for $191.3 million; the Marriott East Side was Strategic Hotel Capital's first hotel in New York City. The new owner subsequently renovated the Marriott East Side extensively. Perkins Eastman designed a steel canopy for the hotel's entrance, which was completed in 2000.

==== 2000s and 2010s ====
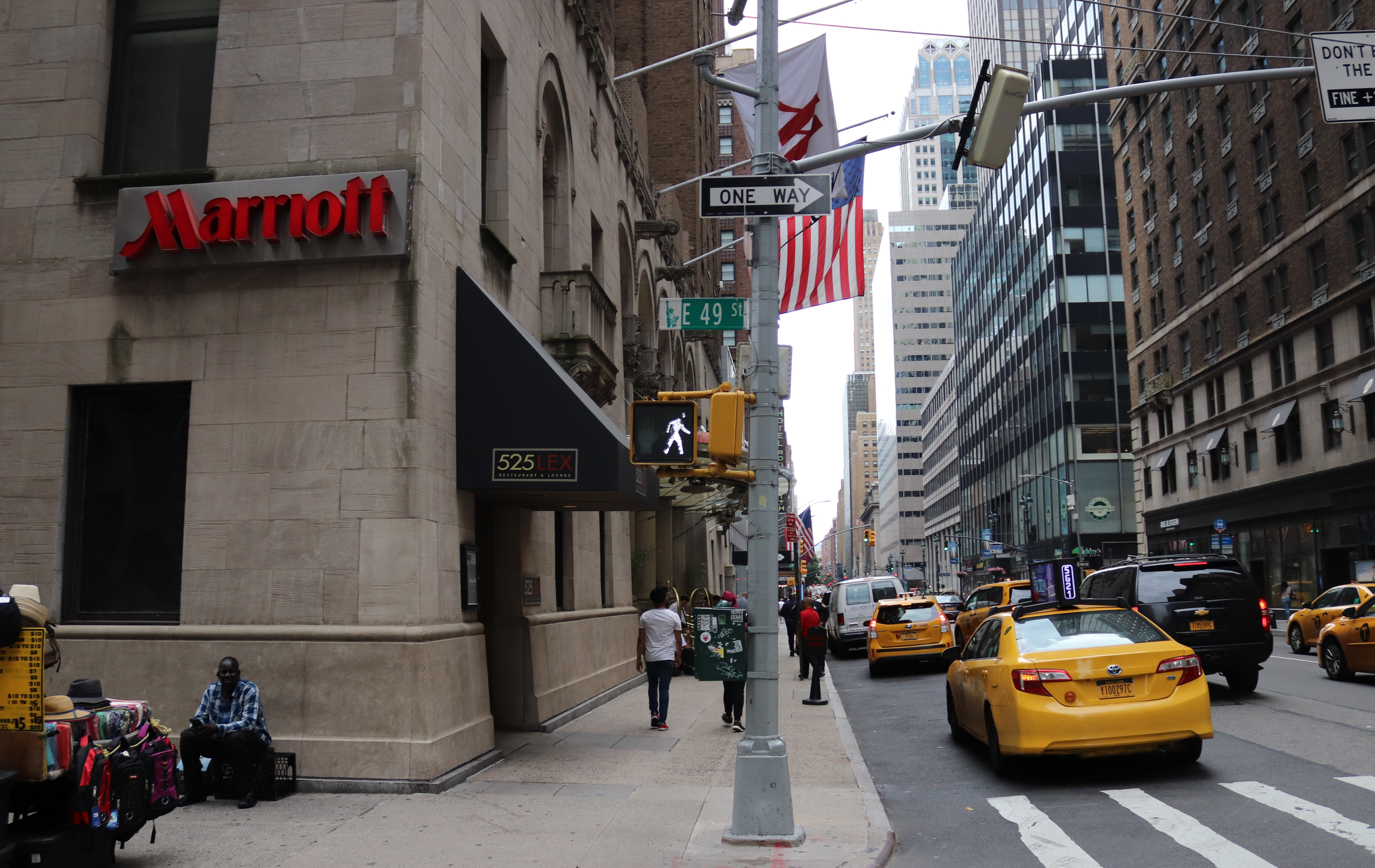
The Lexington Avenue side of the hotel in 2019

The Prime Property Fund, managed by Morgan Stanley, acquired the hotel building in 2005 for $287 million. At the time, the hotel had 646 rooms. The building underwent significant interior renovations in 2007 and exterior refurbishments in 2009. The Marriott chain's first teleconference suite opened at the Marriott East Side in late 2009. The Prime Property Fund was looking to sell the hotel for $350 million by March 2012, having spent $26 million renovating the hostelry.

After mayor Michael Bloomberg proposed rezoning East Midtown in 2012, preservationists began advocating for several structures in the neighborhood to be designated as official landmarks, including the former Shelton. The LPC hosted public hearings in 2013 to determine whether the New York Marriott East Side and four other structures in East Midtown should be designated as New York City landmarks. In mid-2016, the LPC proposed protecting twelve buildings in East Midtown, including the New York Marriott East Side, in advance of proposed changes to the area's zoning. On November 22, 2016, the LPC designated the New York Marriott East Side and ten other nearby buildings as city landmarks.

Ashkenazy Acquisitions offered to buy the hotel for $290 million in December 2014. Morgan Stanley sold the building in 2015 to Lexington Avenue Hotel, a limited partnership between Ashkenazy Acquisition and Deka Immobilien, a subsidiary of DekaBank, for $270 million. Deka Immobilien owned an 85 percent stake in the hotel, while Ashkenazy owned the remaining 15 percent. Ashkenazy and Deka placed the hotel for sale in September 2016 but were unable to find a buyer for the hotel. Ashkenazy signed a contract in March 2019 to purchase the New York Marriott East Side for $174 million, placing $2 million in an escrow account managed by the Chicago Title Insurance Company. Although tourism in New York City was increasing at the time, Deka would have recorded a nearly $100 million loss if the sale had been completed. Ashkenazy twice postponed the purchase date and ultimately failed to buy the hotel before the July 2019 deadline. This prompted Deka to sue Ashkenazy for breach of contract.

==== Conversion to dormitories ====
The New York Marriott East Side closed in March 2020 due to the COVID-19 pandemic and laid off 316 employees that May. The Lexington Avenue Hotel partnership subsequently failed to make payments on its $53 million mortgage, which was to have been paid in July 2020. The closure was intended to be temporary, but in October 2020, it was reported that the hotel had permanently closed. Ashkenazy sued Marriott the same month, accusing Marriott of breach of contract and saying that the hotel misappropriated $12 million to bolster its own balance sheet. Ashkenazy subsequently withdrew its complaint. In February 2021, DekaBank foreclosed on the unpaid mortgage of $63 million. Deka Immobilien ultimately paid back the full loan. This allowed Deka to also take back all the capital that it had invested in Lexington Avenue Hotel; as such, Ashkenazy could potentially lose all the money it had invested in the hotel. That July, a New York state court ruled that Ashkenazy was required to pay its share of the $136 million lien that had been placed on the hotel.

Deka sold the hotel in January 2023 to a joint venture of Beverly Hills-based Hawkins Way Capital and Minneapolis-based Värde Partners. At the time, The Real Deal magazine reported that Hawkins Way and Värde might convert the hotel building to housing. The sale was completed the next month for $153.4 million, a loss of almost $117 million from its previous sale price. The building was renovated into student housing and opened in September 2023 as FOUND Study Turtle Bay, with 1,355 beds for students from nearby colleges. The renovated building includes 30,000 square feet (2,800 m^{2}) of amenities.

== Notable people ==
=== Residents ===
In late 1925, artist couple Alfred Stieglitz and Georgia O'Keeffe moved into a two-room apartment on the 28th floor; they moved to the 30th floor in 1927. O'Keeffe painted several works of the Shelton or of the view from her room; according to Chave, the Shelton was O'Keeffe's "favorite architectural subject—which exemplified a vital turning point in skyscraper design". O'Keeffe later said: "I had never lived up so high before and was so excited that I began talking about trying to paint New York". Additionally, Steiglitz took photographs from the Shelton or from his gallery at An American Place, creating about 90 cityscapes from 1925 to 1937. Among the buildings he photographed from the Shelton were the RCA Building at 30 Rockefeller Plaza and the GE Building at 570 Lexington Avenue.

O'Keeffe and Steiglitz's friend Claude Fayette Bragdon also lived at the hotel, and other artists, such as Miguel Covarrubias, Dorothy Brett, and Harold Clurman, also lived there for periods. The publisher Mitchell Kennerley moved into the hotel in 1948 and lived there for the last two years of his life. The playwright Tennessee Williams also lived at the hotel temporarily in 1945, when one of his plays was being rehearsed on Broadway.

=== Other visitors ===
In 1926, escape artist Harry Houdini escaped from an airtight case at the bottom of the hotel pool in 91 minutes. Canadian magician James Randi, recreating Houdini's escape at the hotel's pool in 1956, escaped in 93 minutes, two minutes slower than Houdini's record.

New York governor W. Averell Harriman and New York County district attorney Frank S. Hogan both had offices at the Shelton Hotel during the late 1950s. Particularly in the late 1970s and early 1980s, numerous politicians held campaign events at the Halloran House. For example, the New York State Democratic Committee selected delegates for the Democratic National Convention at the Halloran House during the 1980 United States presidential election, and Mario Cuomo announced his campaign for the 1982 New York gubernatorial election at the hotel.

Controversial American-Israeli rabbi Meir Kahane was assassinated in the hotel's second-floor conference room on November 5, 1990. El Sayyid Nosair, an Egyptian-born American citizen, was subsequently charged with and acquitted of Kahane's murder, although Nosair admitted to killing Kahane in 1998. News sources retrospectively cited Nosair's actions as one of the earliest examples of Islamic terrorism in the United States.

== Impact ==
=== Critical reception ===
==== Architectural commentary ====
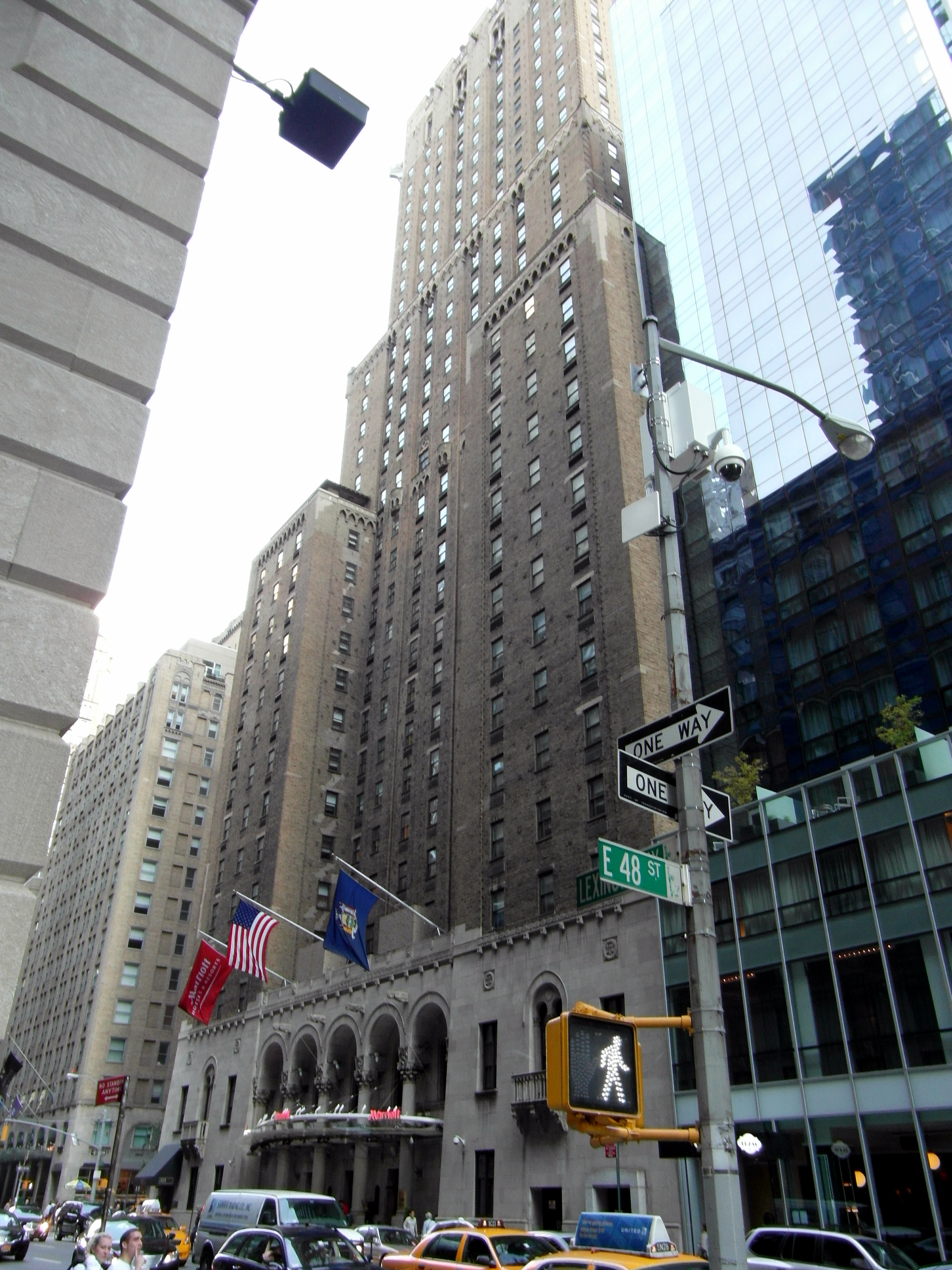
The hotel as seen from Lexington Avenue and 48th Street

Christopher Gray wrote that the completed hotel "attracted near-rave reviews from serious critics, who praised its intelligent treatment of the 1916 setback requirements of the zoning law." When the hotel was being constructed, Fiske Kimball wrote for The New York Times, "We may admire the masterly way in which [Harmon] has built up his receding masses into the vast central tower." Hugh Ferriss, comparing the Shelton to a mountain, observed that Harmon "accepted the [1916 Zoning Resolution] not as a limitation, but as a basis" in designing the Shelton. According to Ferriss, the building's design "evokes that undefinable sense of satisfaction which man ever finds on the slope of the pyramid or the mountainside". George Harold Edgall said the design of the Shelton's facade was like "some titanic result of the force of nature rather than a building by the hand of man". Leon Solon wrote in 1926: "We doubt that any design has exerted so prompt and beneficial an influence, both as regards silhouette in structural mass and textural quality."

Critics also praised the ideals represented in the hotel building. A correspondent for the Manchester Guardian stated that "this audacious and impressive structure is to be a bachelor hotel for more than a thousand men [...] One feels here implicit a new theory of form", although the correspondent also believed that "the Shelton is uninteresting in colour". Bragdon praised the hotel for its "success of conception, the power to imagine and dramatize a building to the city-dweller the most successful escape from the dirt, ugliness, noise, promiscuity of the city." However, Bragdon felt that the interior "fails somehow to convey the sense of fresh and powerful ideation inspired by the exterior." The New Yorker's architectural critic George S. Chappell said of the hotel: "Its details are simple, its lines graceful, its ornament interesting. It is a building designed for modern New York." Two New York Times writers called the Shelton "a stately, breath-taking building", while Lewis Mumford characterized the hotel as "buoyant, mobile, serene, like a Zeppelin under a clear sky". In a 1932 survey of 50 American architects, four ranked the Shelton as the United States' best building.

Architectural historian Ada Louise Huxtable wrote that, by the 1960s, the hotel's architecture had largely been forgotten and that only architectural historians and real-estate developers were interested in it. Huxtable, in a retrospective review of the hotel, called the style "rather indeterminate, ranging from simple traditional with fine marble and ironwork, to early Schrafft's." In the 1970s. The New York Times described the gargoyles on the facade as "benevolent beasts". After the late-1970s renovation, Paul Goldberger said the Shelton's "loss would have inflicted not only visual blow to the city's skyline but scholarly blow to the history of architecture", although he said the redesigned interiors, while "well-intended", were "no match for the original building".

==== Hotel commentary ====
After the guestrooms were renovated in 2007, Oyster.com wrote: "These days, the original Shelton is only apparent in fragments, an original staircase here, an old stained-glass window there. [...] The 646 guest rooms above, however, are all modern." The U.S. News & World Report wrote: "Some recent visitors said this Midtown East Marriott, just about a mile walk from Central Park, gets the proverbial job done – it's a pleasant place to hang your hat, but it doesn't offer anything too exciting."

=== Influence ===
According to architect and writer Robert A. M. Stern, the hotel's design "unleashed a trend toward skyscraper apartments and hotels as intense as the passion for skyscraper offices". The facade and massing of the Barbizon 63 hotel, on 63rd Street, was directly influenced by that of the Shelton. Architectural historians have described the Shelton's design as having influenced various 20th-century skyscrapers such as the Barclay–Vesey Building, 26 Broadway, and the lower stories of the Empire State Building. Architectural historian Carol Willis wrote that the Shelton, along with the Barclay–Vesey Building, "helped to popularize an aesthetic of simple, sculptural mass that became the benchmark of progressive design" by the mid-1920s.

== See also ==
- List of former hotels in Manhattan
- List of hotels in New York City
- List of New York City Designated Landmarks in Manhattan from 14th to 59th Streets
