= Alexander Beggrov =

Russian painter (1841–1914)

- Александр Карлович Беггров
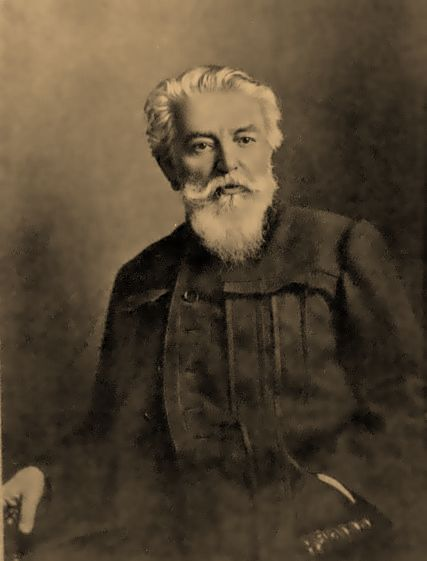
- Portrait of Beggrov by an unknown artist (1890)
- Born: 17 December 1841; Saint Petersburg
- Died: 14 April 1914 (aged 72); Gatchina
- Education: Member Academy of Arts (1899)
- Known for: Painting
- Movement: Peredvizhniki

Alexander Karlovich Beggrov (Alexander Beggrow, Russian: Александр Карлович Беггров, 29 December [O.S. 17 December] 1841 – 27 April [O.S. 14 April] 1914) was a Russian landscape and marine art painter of Baltic German origin, notable for his seascapes and Saint Petersburg cityscapes.

== Biography ==
Alexander Beggrov was a son of Karl Beggrov (Beggrow), a German painter who spent all his career in Russia. He decided to become a naval officer, and in 1863, he went into the navy. In particular, in 1871-1872 he participated in the round-the-world journey. Still as a naval officer, in 1868 he started his art studies under the supervision of Alexey Bogolyubov. In 1873, Bogolyubov moved to France, and Beggrov, who wanted to continue his art studies, enrolled in the Royal Academy of Arts, where he studied under Mikhail Konstantinovich Clodt for a year. In 1874, he retired from the navy and moved to Paris, where he mainly continued to work under the guidance of Bogolyubov. He also got to know Russian artists working in France, including Ilya Repin.

In 1875, Beggrov returned to Saint Petersburg, and in 1878, he joined the Society for Travelling Art Exhibitions. In 1879, he travelled by sea to Greece, and from there to France, where he stayed for two years. Subsequently, Alexander Beggrov moved back to Russia and settled in Gatchina. In 1903, his wife died. Last years of his life, Beggrov was terminally ill. In August 1914, he committed suicide.

== Selected paintings ==
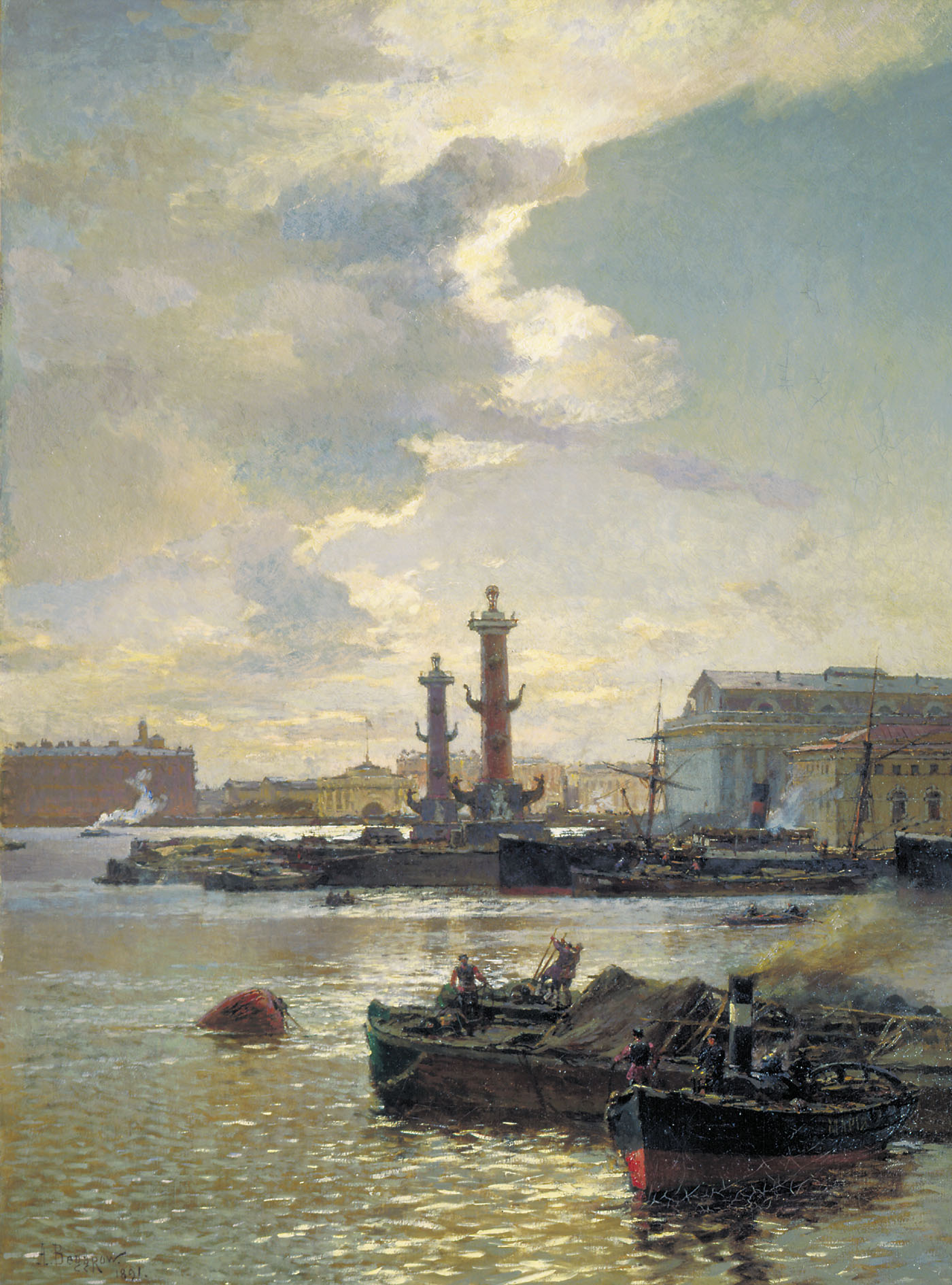
Petersburg Exchange (1891)

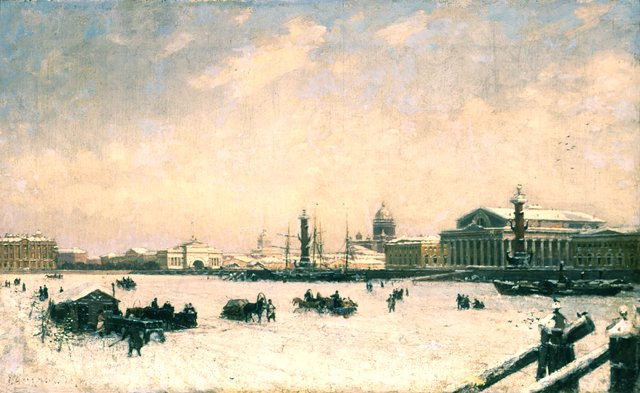
Saint Petersburg in winter (1879)

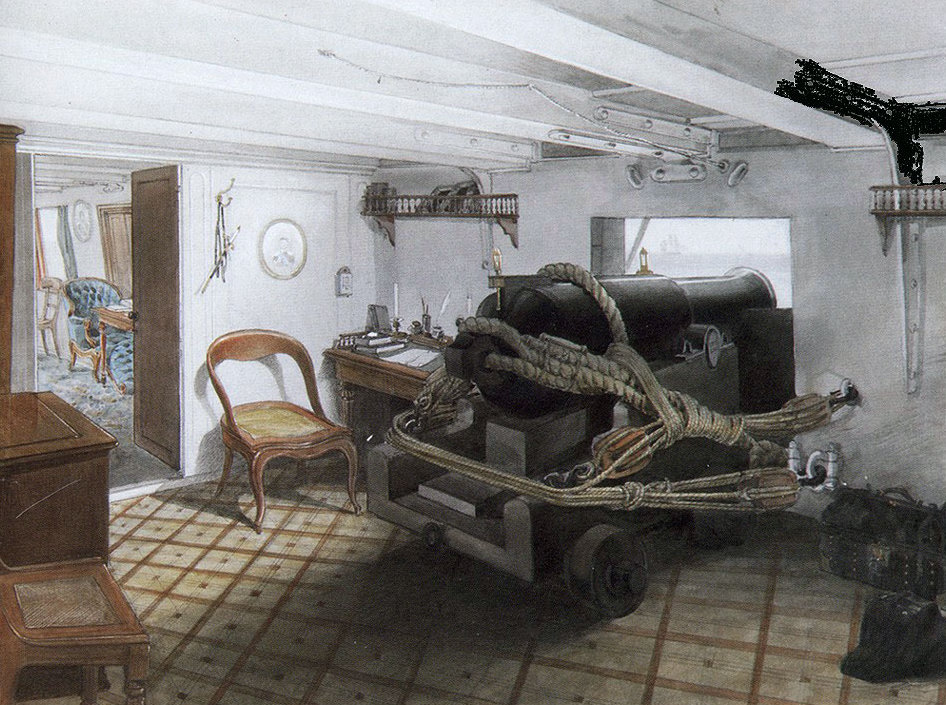
Gunfire Casement on the Frigate "Oslyabya"

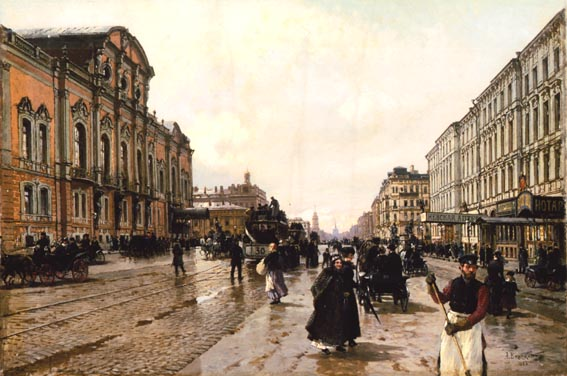
Morning on Nevsky Prospekt (1886)

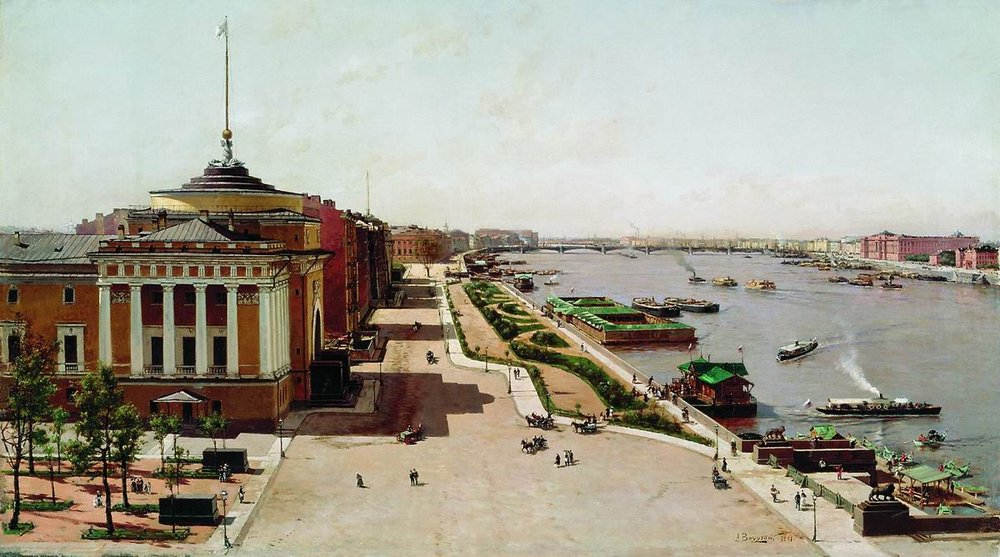
Embankment at the Admiralty (1881)

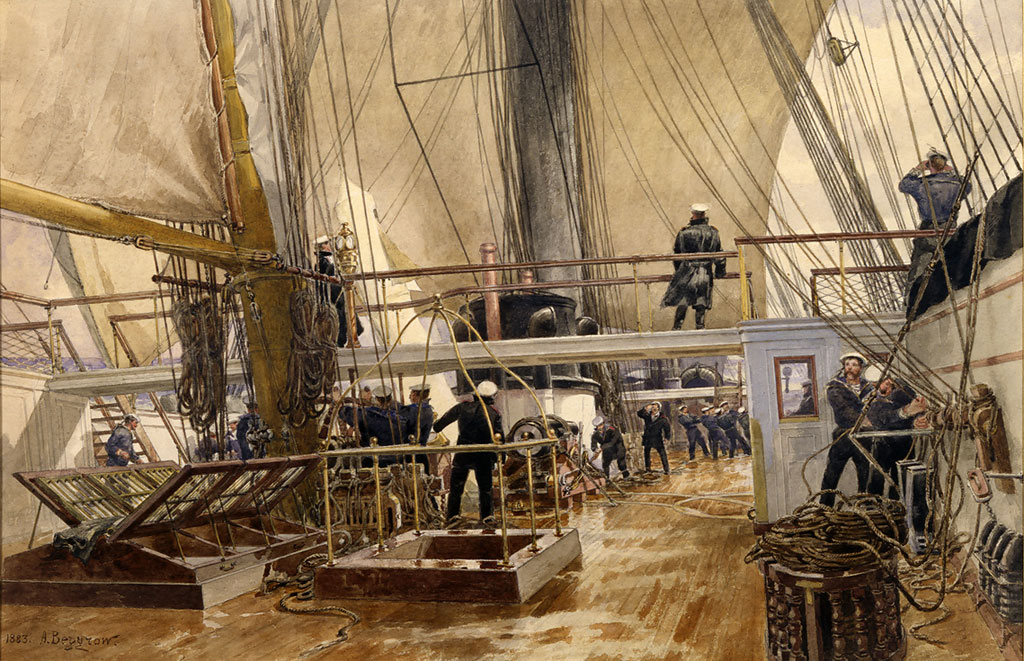
On the Deck of the Frigate "Svetlana" (1883)
