= Anna C. Chave =

American art historian

- Education: Reed College, Sorbonne, Harvard University, Yale University
- Occupations: Art historian, professor, art critic

Anna C. Chave is an art historian and professor at Queens College and the Graduate Center of the City University of New York (CUNY). She is best known for her research and publications on modern sculpture and the New York School. She has published many essays concerned with issues of gender and identity, reception and interpretation, mainly with respect to 20th century art. Her artist subjects have ranged from early Pablo Picasso and Georgia O'Keeffe, to Jackson Pollock and Hannah Wilke.

== Academic career ==
Chave attended Reed College, the Sorbonne in Paris, and received her B.A. from Harvard University. She received her Ph.D. from Yale in 1982.

She is widely known for her revisionist readings of Minimalism, including "Minimalism and the Rhetoric of Power", and for her monographs on Rothko and Brancusi (Yale University Press, 1991 and 1993).

== Bibliography ==
=== Selected books by Chave ===
- Constantin Brancusi: Shifting the Bases of Art. New Haven: Yale University Press, 1993. (ISBN 9780300055269)
- Mark Rothko: Subjects in Abstraction. New Haven: Yale University Press, 1989. (ISBN 9780300041781)

=== Selected essays and articles by Chave ===
- "The Guerrilla Girls' Reckoning." Art Journal 70, no. 3 (Fall 2011): 102-111.
- "'Is this good for Vulva?': Female Genitalia in Contemporary Art." Anna C. Chave and Francis Naumann. The Visible Vagina. Ex. Cat. New York: Francis Naumann Gallery, 2010.
- "Revaluing Minimalism: Patronage, Aura, and Place." Art Bulletin 90 no. 3 (September 2008): 466-86.
- "Dis/Cover/ing the Quilts of Gee's Bend, Alabama." The Journal of Modern Craft 1 no. 2 (July 2008): 221-54.
- "Figuring the Origins of the Modern at the Fin de Siecle: The Trope of the Pathetic Male." Making Art History. ed. Elizabeth Mansfield. London: Routledge, 2007.
- "'Normal Ills': On Embodiment, Victimization, and the Origins of Feminist Art." Trauma and Visuality in Modernity.eds. Eric Rosenberg and Lisa Saltzman. Hanover: University Press of New England, 2006.
- "Minimalism and Biography." Art Bulletin 82 no. 1 (March 2000): 149-63.
- Minimalism and Rhetoric of Power Art in Modern Culture: an anthology of critical texts
