= Cityscape =

Artistic representation of the physical aspects of a city or urban area

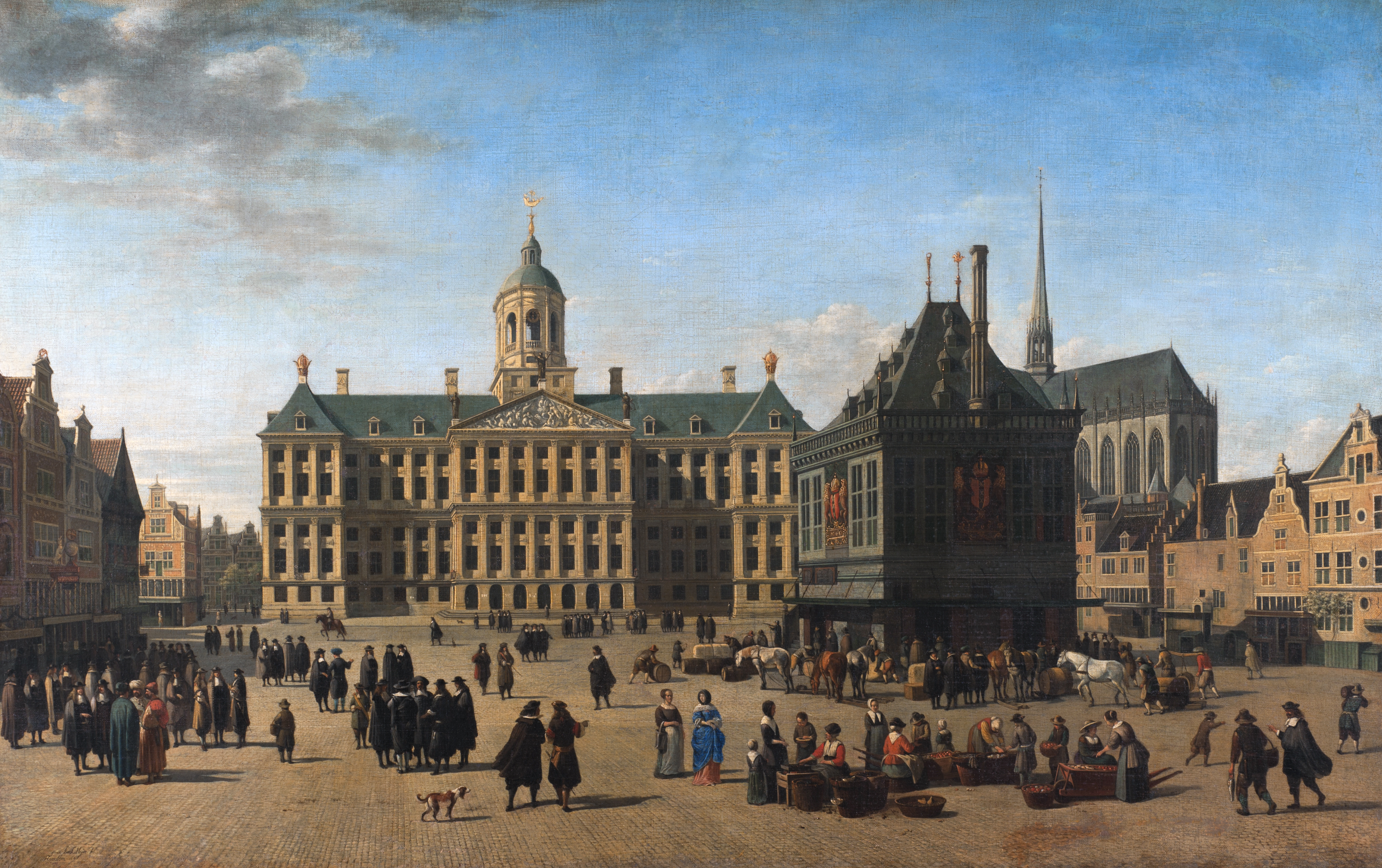
Painting of the Dam Square in Amsterdam, by Gerrit Adriaensz Berckheyde, c. 1660

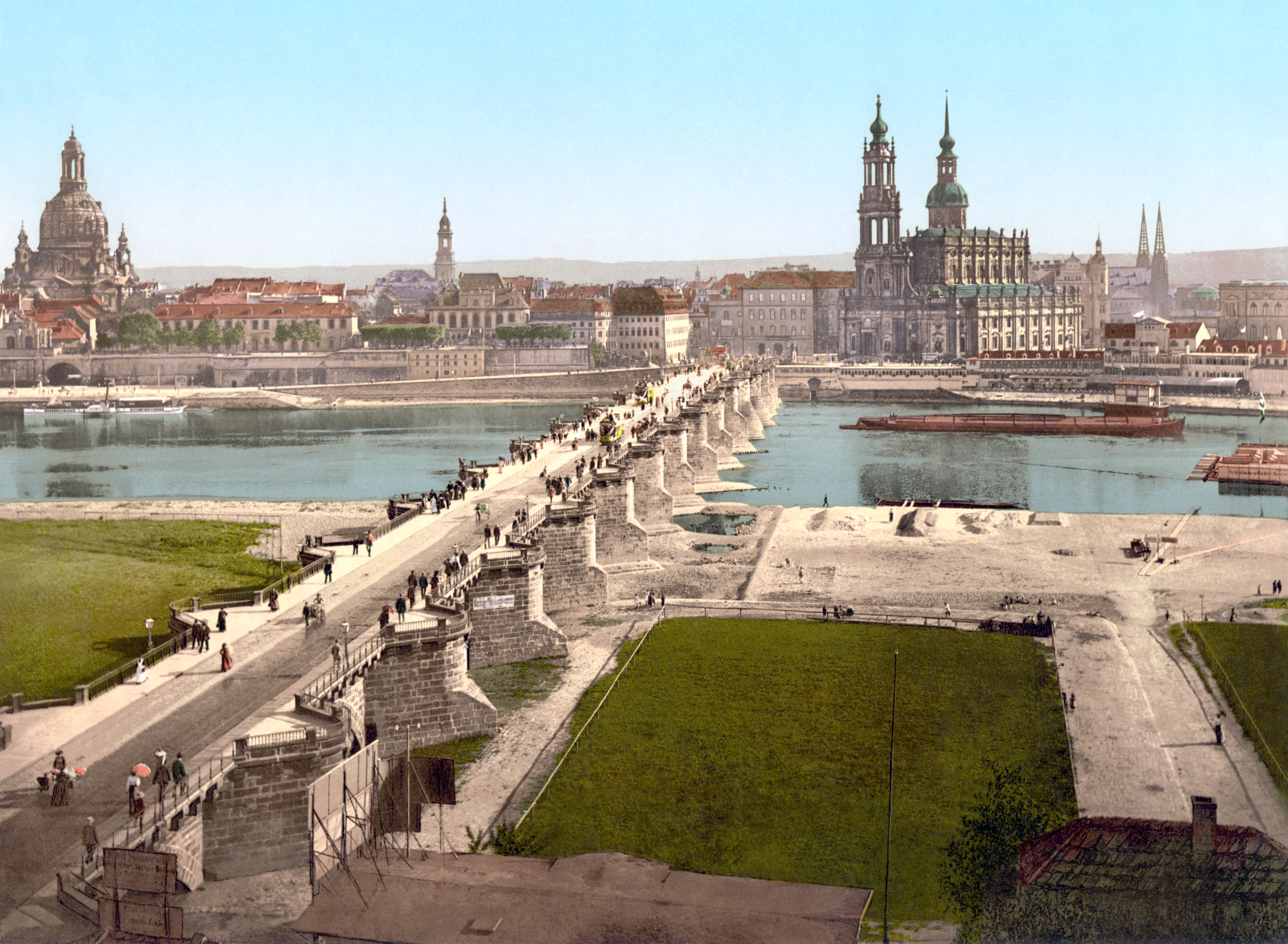
Photograph of Dresden, Germany, in the 1890s

In the visual arts, a cityscape (urban landscape) is an artistic representation, such as a painting, drawing, print or photograph, of the physical aspects of a city or urban area. It is the urban equivalent of a landscape. Townscape is roughly synonymous with cityscape, though it implies the same difference in urban size and density (and even modernity) implicit in the difference between the words city and town. In urban design the terms refer to the configuration of built forms and interstitial space.

== History of cityscapes in art ==
From the first century A.D. dates a fresco at the Baths of Trajan in Rome depicting a bird's eye view of an ancient city. In the Middle Ages, cityscapes appeared as a background for portraits and biblical themes. From the 16th up to the 18th century numerous copperplate prints and etchings were made showing cities in bird's eye view. The function of these prints was to provide a map-like overview.

In Ancient China, scroll paintings such as Along the River During the Qingming Festival (Qingming Shanghe Tu) offer a panoramic view of the cities depicted.

Halfway through the 17th century the cityscape became an independent genre in the Netherlands. In his famous View of Delft in 1660–1661 Jan Vermeer painted a quite accurate portrait of the city Delft. Cities like Amsterdam, Haarlem and The Hague also became popular subjects for paintings. Painters from other European countries (i.e., Great Britain, France, Germany) followed the Dutch example. The 18th century was a flourishing period for cityscape painting in Venice (Canaletto, Guardi).

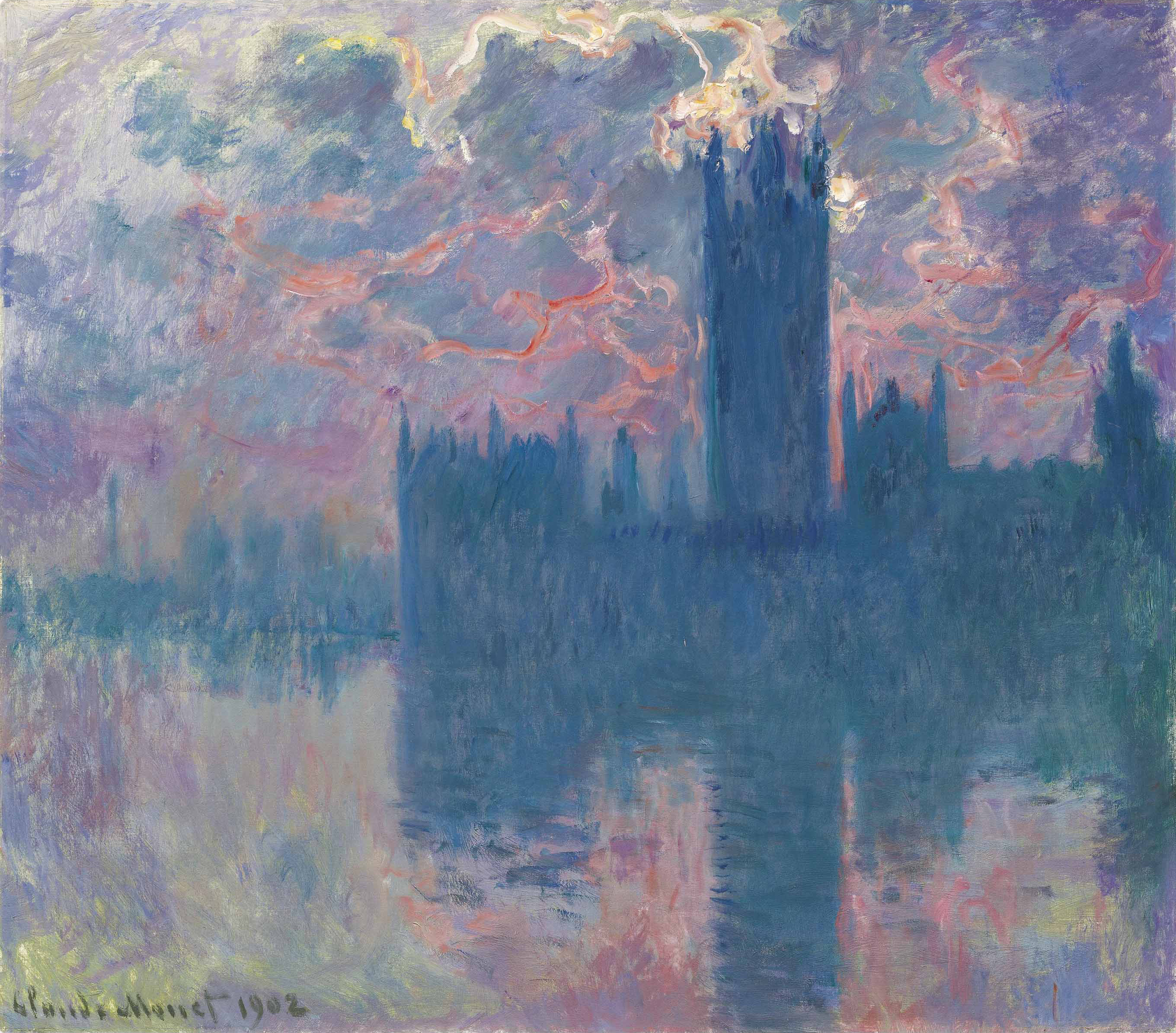
Houses of Parliament, Sunset, 1902, by Claude Monet

At the end of the 19th century the impressionists focused on the atmosphere and dynamics of everyday life in the city. Suburban and industrial areas, building sites and railway yards also became subjects for cityscapes. During the 20th century attention became focused on abstract and conceptual art, and thus the production of cityscapes declined. American painter Edward Hopper, who stayed loyal to figurative painting, created intriguing images of the American scene. With a revival of figurative art at the end of the 20th century comes a revaluation of the cityscape. Well-known living cityscape painters are Rackstraw Downes, Antonio López García, and Richard Estes. American artist Yvonne Jacquette has made a specialty of aerial cityscapes.

== Selected cityscape painters ==
Going to Work by L. S. Lowry

- Alexander Beggrov
- Bernardo Bellotto
- Johann Berthelsen
- George Hendrik Breitner
- Gustave Caillebotte
- Canaletto
- Edouard Leon Cortés
- John Atkinson Grimshaw
- Francesco Guardi
- Childe Hassam
- Jan van der Heyden
- Edward Hopper
- Isaac Israëls
- L. S. Lowry
- Matthäus Merian
- Georgia O'Keeffe
- Camille Pissarro
- Jacob Lawrence
- Paul Signac
- Alfred Sisley
- Pyotr Vereshchagin
- Jan Vermeer
- Brian Whelan
- James McNeill Whistler
- Guy C. Wiggins
- Stephen Wiltshire

== Selected cityscape photographers ==
- Berenice Abbott
- Eugène Atget
- Henri Cartier-Bresson
- André Kertész
- Andrew Prokos
- Edward Steichen

== See also ==
- Gordon Cullen
- Landscape painting
- List of cities with most skyscrapers
- Skyline
- Skyscraper
- Veduta
