= New York skyscraper paintings of Georgia O'Keeffe =

Series of paintings by Georgia O'Keeffe

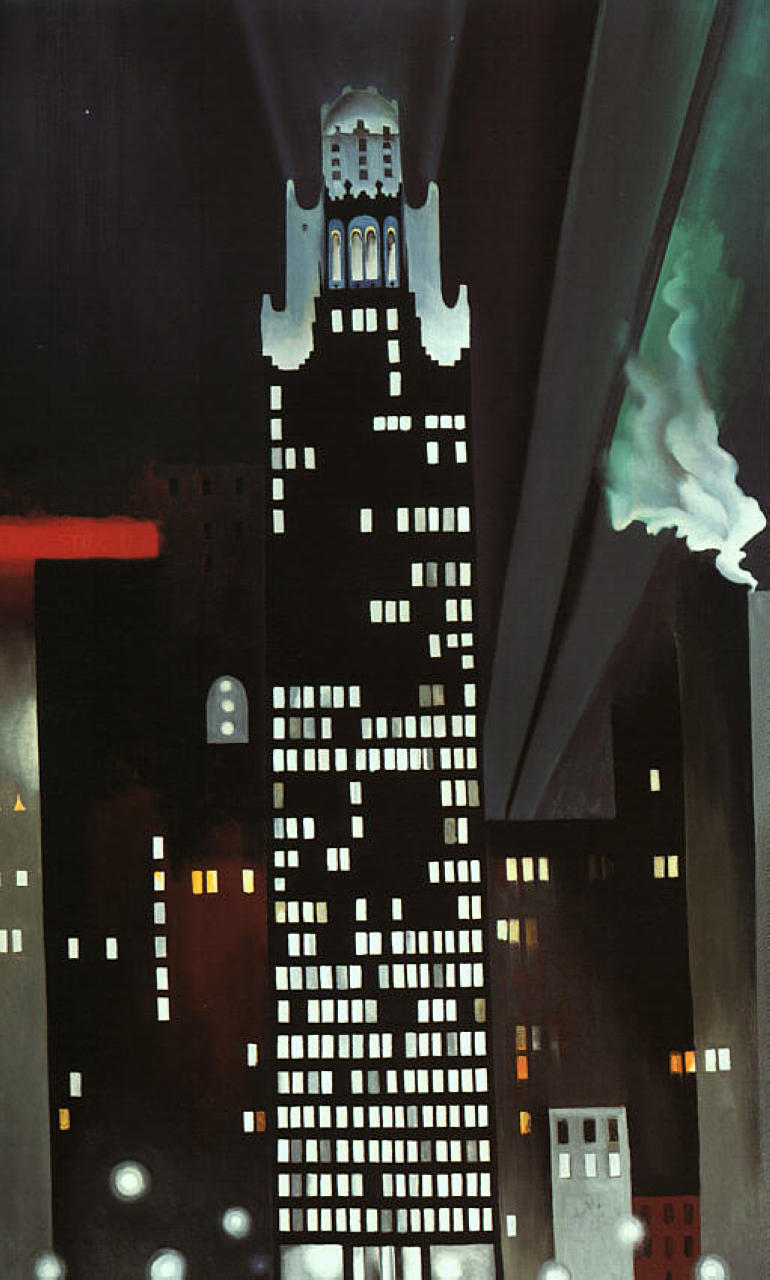
Georgia O'Keeffe, Radiator Building—Night, New York, 1927, The Alfred Stieglitz Collection, Crystal Bridges Museum of American Art, Bentonville, Arkansas

Georgia O'Keeffe created a series of paintings of skyscrapers in New York City between 1925 and 1929. They were made after O'Keeffe moved with her new husband into an apartment on the 30th floor of the Shelton Hotel, which gave her expansive views of all but the west side of the city. She expressed her appreciation of the city's early skyscrapers that were built by the end of the 1920s. One of her most notable works, which demonstrates her skill at depicting the buildings in the Precisionist style, is the Radiator Building—Night, New York, of the American Radiator Building.

== Background ==
In November 1925, O'Keeffe moved into one of New York City's tallest skyscrapers, the Shelton Hotel, with her husband of one year, Alfred Stieglitz. They lived on the 30th floor with clear, unobstructed northern, eastern, and southern views of the city. The building was located between 48th and 49th Streets on Lexington Avenue. O'Keeffe said of her interest in painting cityscapes, "I know it's unusual for an artist to want to work way up near the roof of a big hotel, in the heart of a roaring city, but I think that's just what the artist of today needs for stimulus. ... Today the city is something bigger, grander, more complex than ever before in history."

Like photographer Charles Sheeler, watercolorist Charles Demuth, and other artists, she was interested in capturing "the mystique of the skyscrapers" that were a symbol of the modern world, and, at that time, a largely American phenomenon. Claude Fayette Bragdon, an American architect, said, "Not only is the skyscraper a symbol of the American Spirit—restless, centrifugal, seriously poised—but it is the only original development in the field of architecture to which we can lay unchallenged claim."

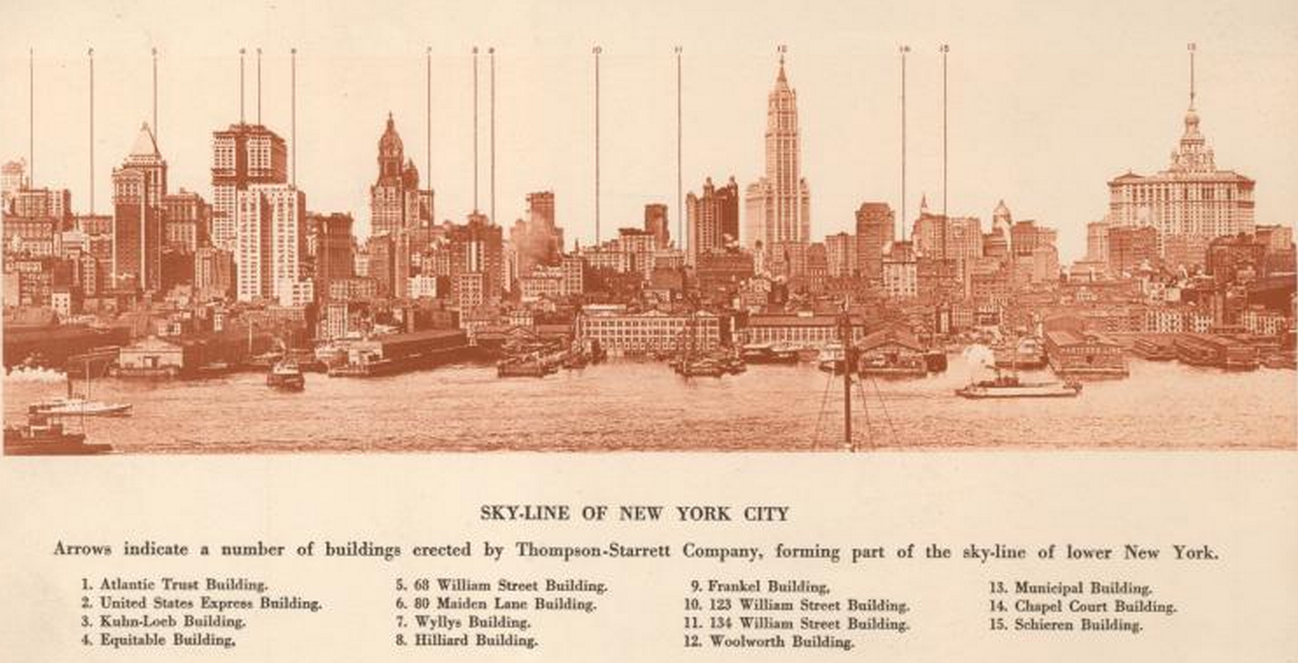
New York skyline in 1920

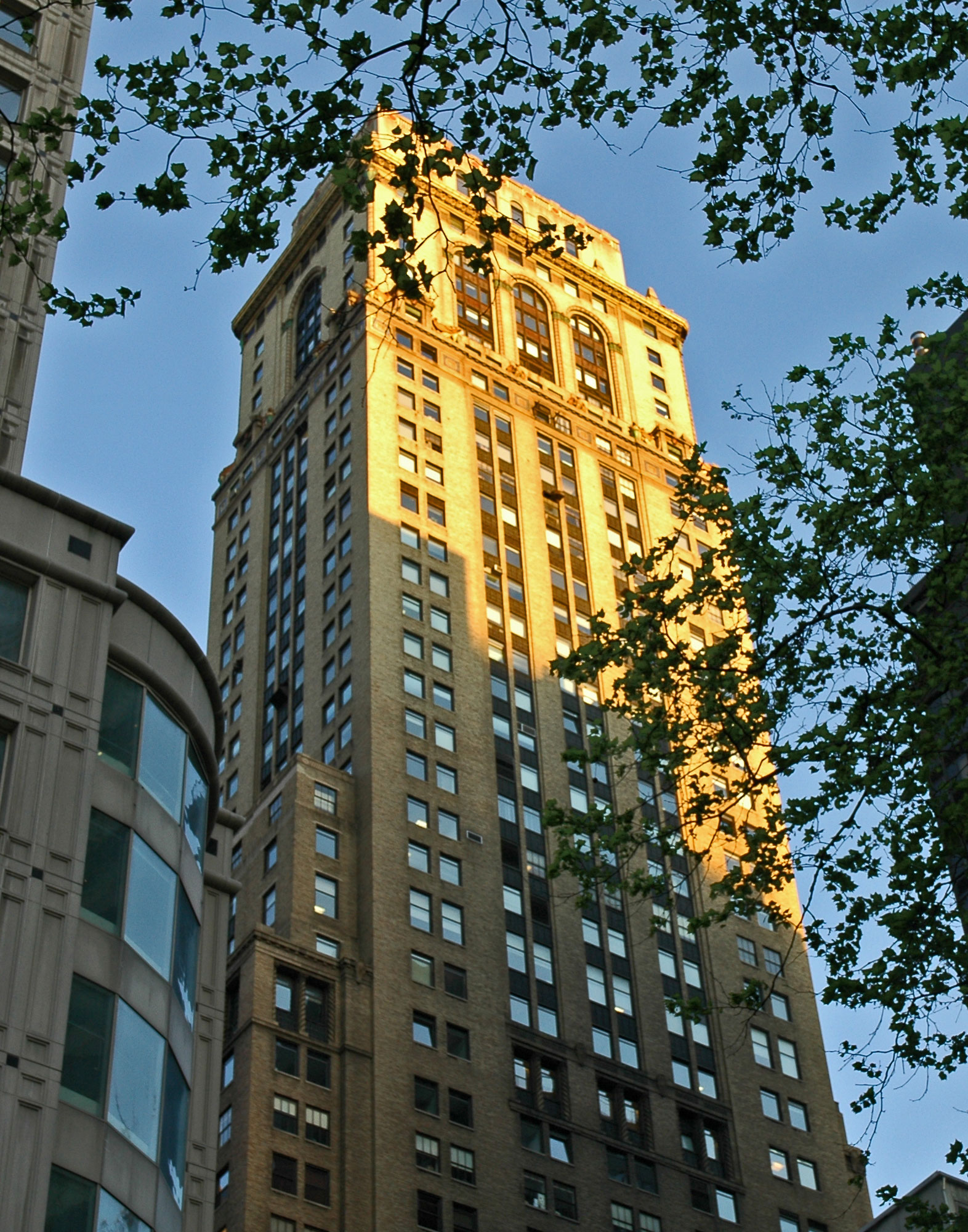
10 East 40th Street, in New York City, built in the 1920s

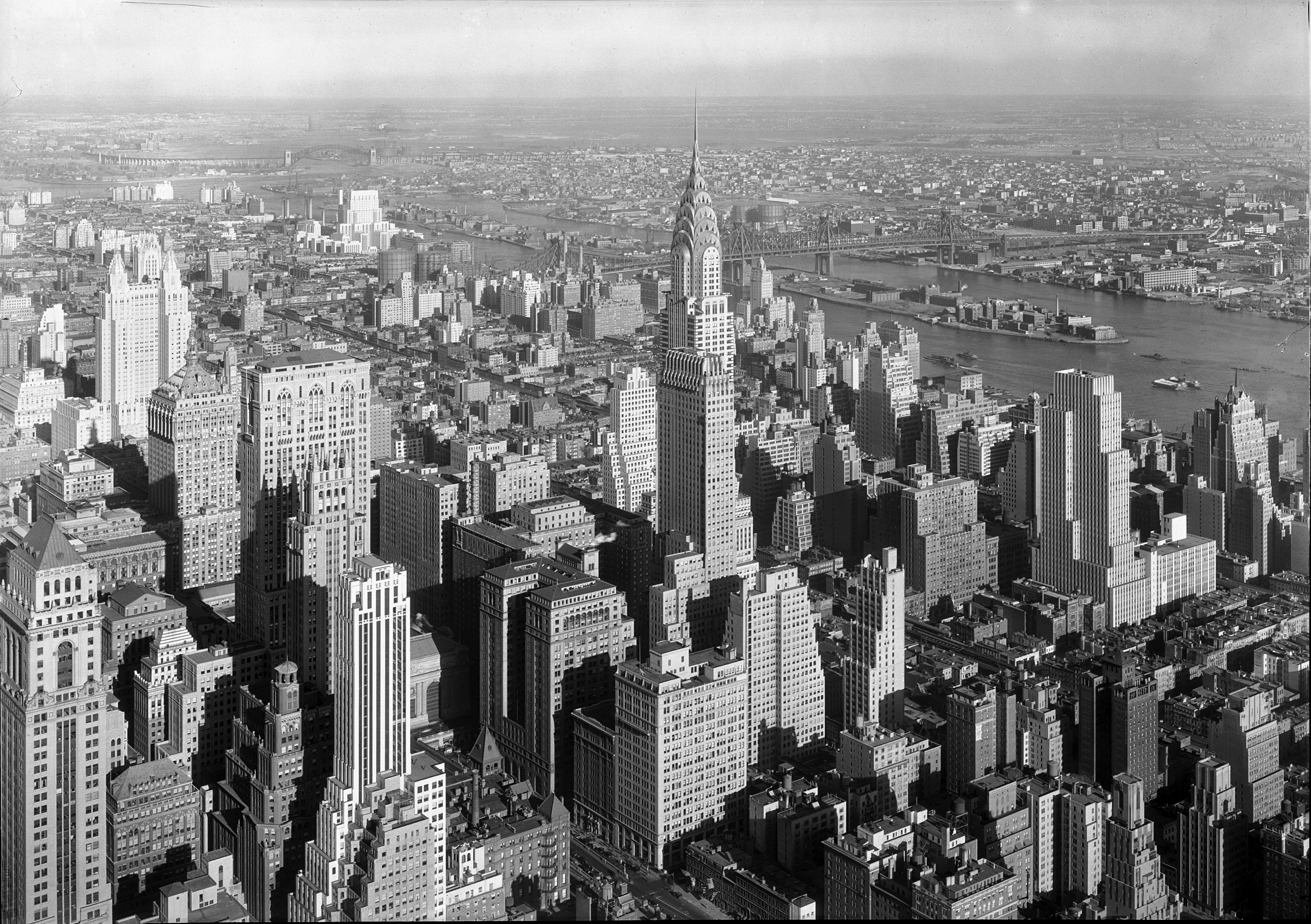
1932 skyscrapers

== Series ==
O'Keeffe made about 25 drawings and paintings of New York City skyscrapers and cityscapes between 1925 and 1929. Her works are evocative of her own style.

In 1925, she created New York Street with Moon, which reflects her opinion that "one can't paint New York as it is, but rather as it is felt." Between the city skyscrapers is a sunset with a moon and fluffy clouds. The tall buildings, in an angled composition, are in the shadows and a streetlight casts a bright halo.

External images
- New York Street with Moon, 1925
- The Shelton with Sunspots, N.Y., 1926
- City Night, 1926
- New York Night, 1928 / 1929

She made The Shelton with Sunspots, N.Y. in 1926 that depicts an optical illusion that O'Keeffe saw of the Shelton Hotel one morning where there appeared to be "a bite out of one side of the tower made by the sun, with sunspots against the building and against the sky". An abstract painting made of rectangles and circles, it unifies the man-made skyscraper and the natural effect of glaring sunlight and sunspots against the building. The composition, taken from the street level, reflects the sense of awe that O'Keeffe felt about skyscrapers. City Night, made the same year, depicts another form of illusion. The skyscrapers in the painting converge vertically, creating a cavernous image with simple geometric shapes. The buildings tower above the city streets and the bright moon. "With the eyes of a modernist, she has simplified the internal articulation of these behemoths, thus emphasizing their dark, vertical silhouettes against the deep blue sky," states art historian Eleanor Tufts.

O'Keeffe used light in New York Night (1928/1929) to indicate "warmth and life in the city", though lighted streets and illuminated windows of dark buildings.

Crystal Bridges Museum of American Art describes Radiator Building—Night, New York as O'Keeffe's "grandest statement on New York City". While made with a simplified style of Precisionism, it is also a realistic and skillful depiction of an architectural building. O'Keeffe portrays the architectural elements of the Radiator Building, and what it looks like illuminated against the night sky. The upper floors of the building look like steps, which are illuminated at night with bright lights. Electric companies encouraged architects to include lighting in their designs, which made the buildings look more impressive. A diagonal beam evokes movement. The ethereal smoke, which lines look like flowers, is contrasted against the straight lines of the skyscraper. Stieglitz's name is set in red lights by the Scientific American Building and the composition may be seen as a double portrait, with O'Keeffe represented by the Radiator Building.

== Cityscapes ==
External image
- East River from the Thirtieth Story of the Shelton Hotel, 1928

O'Keeffe depicted a realistic view of Manhattan rooftops, the East River, and Long Island City of Queens in East River from the Thirtieth Story of the Shelton Hotel in 1928. Beyond the Manhattan skyline and the East River, factories in Queens emit smoke, creating a smoggy atmosphere and a dismal image.

== 1929 events ==
O'Keeffe stopped depicting New York's skyscrapers and its cityscape in 1929, when she went to Mabel Dodge Luhan's ranch in Taos, New Mexico and developed an interest in making paintings of the Southwest. At the time, she was unhappy in her marriage and with city life. Additionally, skyscrapers, which had been a symbol of America's success, became a symbol of its failure with the Wall Street crash of 1929.

== See also ==
- Cityscape
- Early skyscrapers
- List of skyscrapers in New York City
