= Aberdaron =

Community in Gwynedd, Wales

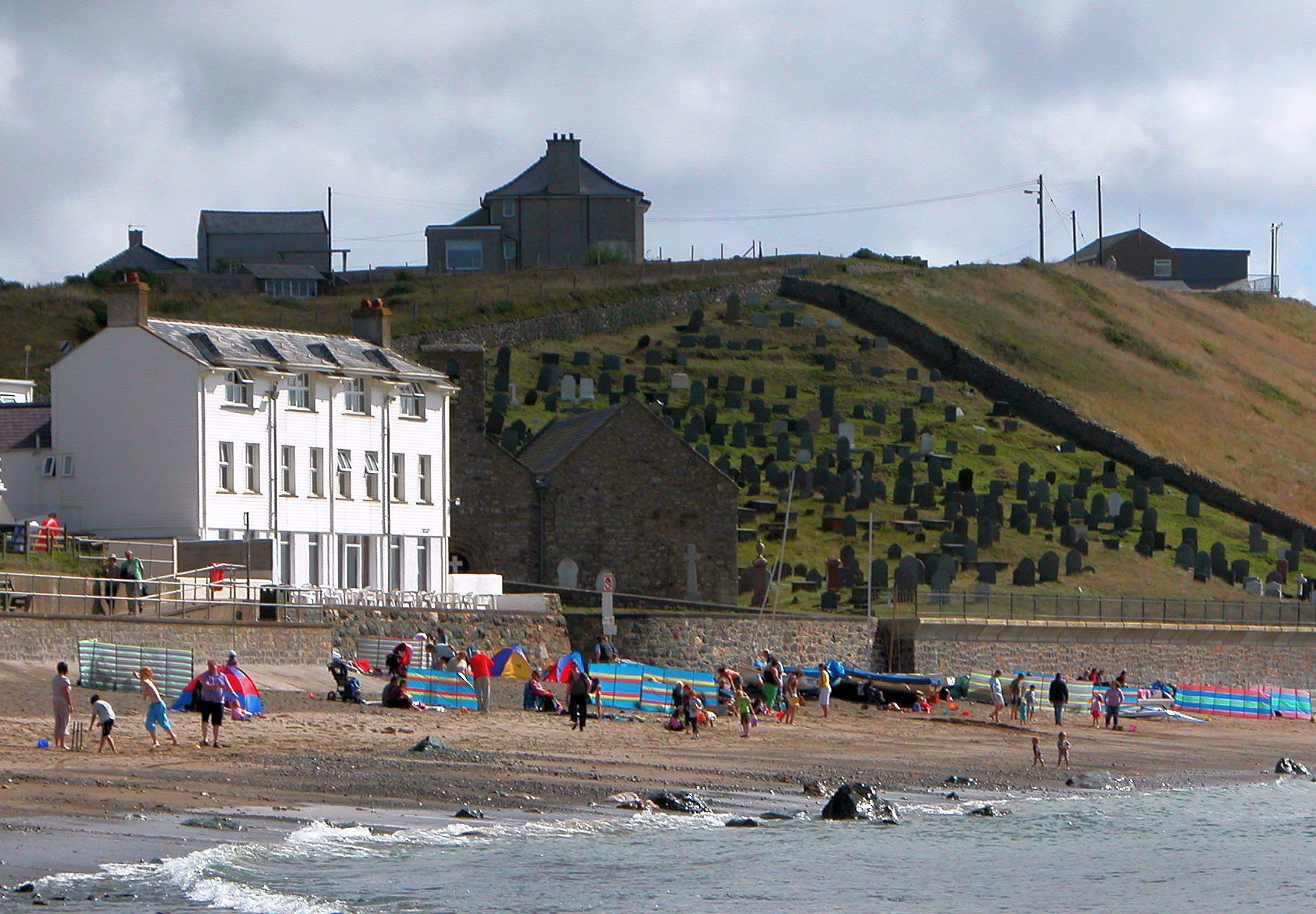
- The Tŷ Newydd Hotel on the beach at Aberdaron

- Location within Gwynedd
- Area: 47.71 km^{2} (18.42 sq mi)
- Population: 965 (2011)
  - Density: 20/km^{2} (52/sq mi)
- OS grid reference: SH173268
- Community: Aberdaron
- Principal area: Gwynedd
- Preserved county: Gwynedd
- Country: Wales
- Sovereign state: United Kingdom
- Post town: PWLLHELI
- Postcode district: LL53
- Dialling code: 01758
- Police: North Wales
- Fire: North Wales
- Ambulance: Welsh
- UK Parliament: Dwyfor Meirionnydd
- Senedd Cymru – Welsh Parliament: Gwynedd Maldwyn
- List of places UK Wales Gwynedd 52.808°N 4.710°W Map of the community

Aberdaron (Welsh pronunciation: [abɛrˈdarɔn]) is a community, electoral ward and former fishing village at the western tip of the Llŷn Peninsula in the Welsh county of Gwynedd. It lies 14.8 miles (23.8 km) west of Pwllheli and 33.5 miles (53.9 km) south-west of Caernarfon; as of 2021, it has a population of 896. The community includes Bardsey Island (Welsh: Ynys Enlli), the coastal area around Porthor, and the villages of Anelog, Llanfaelrhys, Penycaerau, Rhoshirwaun, Rhydlios, Uwchmynydd and Y Rhiw. It covers an area of just under 50 square kilometres.

Y Rhiw and Llanfaelrhys have long been linked by sharing rectors and by their close proximity, but were originally ecclesiastical parishes in themselves. The parish of Bodferin/Bodverin was assimilated in the 19th century. The village was the last rest stop for pilgrims heading to Bardsey Island (Ynys Enlli), the legendary "island of 20,000 saints". In the 18th and 19th centuries, it developed as a shipbuilding centre and port. The mining and quarrying industries became major employers, and limestone, lead, jasper and manganese (Mango) were exported. There are the ruins of an old pier running out to sea at Porth Simdde, which is the local name for the west end of Aberdaron Beach. After the Second World War, the mining industry collapsed and Aberdaron gradually developed into a holiday resort. The beach was awarded a Seaside Award in 2008.

The coastal waters are part of Pen Llŷn a'r Sarnau Special Area of Conservation, one of the largest marine designated sites in the United Kingdom. The coast itself forms part of the Aberdaron Coast and Bardsey Island Special Protection Area and was designated a Heritage Coast in 1974. In 1956, the area was included in Llŷn Area of Outstanding Natural Beauty. Conservation Areas have been created in Aberdaron, Bardsey Island and Y Rhiw; the area has been designated a Landscape of Historic Interest.

== Etymology ==
Aberdaron means "Mouth of the Daron river", a reference to the river (Welsh: Afon Daron) which flows into the sea at Aberdaron Bay.

The river itself is named after Daron, an ancient Celtic goddess of oak trees, with Dâr being an archaic Welsh word for oak. As such, the name shares an etymology with Aberdare and the Dare river (Welsh: afon Dâr).

== Prehistory ==
The area around Aberdaron has been inhabited by people for millennia. Evidence from the Iron Age hillfort at Castell Odo, on Mynydd Ystum, shows that some phases of its construction began unusually early, in the late Bronze Age, between 2850 and 2650 years before present (BP). The construction was wholly defensive but, in later phases, defence appears to have been less important; in the last phase, the fort's ramparts were deliberately flattened, suggesting there was no longer a need for defence. The Bronze and Iron Age double-ringed fortification at Meillionnydd was occupied intensively from at least the 8/7th to the 3rd/2nd century BCE and was also deliberately flattened. It appears that Aberdaron became an undefended farming community. Ptolemy calls the Llŷn Peninsula Ganganorum Promontorium (English: Peninsula of the Gangani); the Gangani were a tribe of Celts also found in Ireland and it is thought there may have been strong ties with Leinster.

== History ==
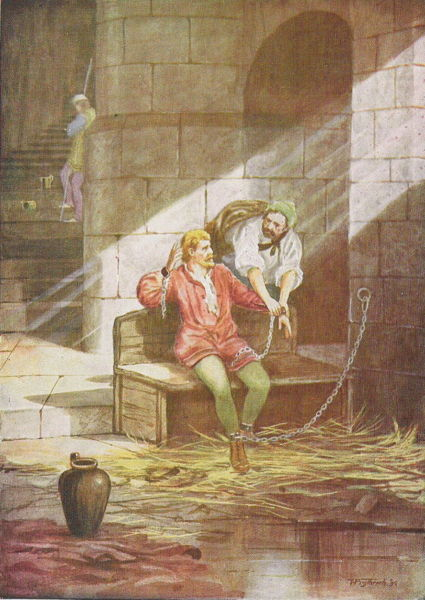
Gruffudd ap Cynan, the exiled King of Gwynedd, sought sanctuary in St Hywyn's Church in 1094

The church at Aberdaron had the ancient privilege of sanctuary. In 1094, Gruffudd ap Cynan, the exiled King of Gwynedd, sought refuge in the church while attempting to recapture his throne; he escaped in the monastic community's boat to Ireland. He regained his territories in 1101 and, in 1115, Gruffydd ap Rhys, the exiled prince of Deheubarth, took refuge at Aberdaron to escape capture by Gwynedd's ruler. Henry I of England had invaded Gwynedd the previous year and, faced by an overwhelming force, Gruffudd ap Cynan had been forced to pay homage and a substantial fine to Henry. The King of Gwynedd, seeking to give up the exiled prince to Henry, ordered that the fugitive prince be dragged from the church by force, but his soldiers were beaten back by the local clergy; Gruffydd ap Rhys escaped under cover of night and fled south to join up with his supporters in Ystrad Tywi.

Following the conquest of Gwynedd, in 1284, Edward I set about touring his new territories. He visited the castles at Conwy and Caernarfon. Court was held at Nefyn, at which his new subjects were expected to demonstrate their loyalty; he visited Aberdaron on his way to Bardsey Abbey.

The medieval townships of Aberdaron were Isseley (Bugelis, Rhedynfra, Dwyros, Anhegraig, Cyllyfelin, Gwthrian, Deuglawdd and Bodernabdwy), Uwchseley (Anelog, Pwlldefaid, Llanllawen, Ystohelig, Bodermid, Trecornen), Ultradaron (Penrhyn, Cadlan, Ysgo, Llanllawen) and Bodrydd (Penycaerau, Bodrydd, Bodwyddog). These locatives predate the idea of the modern ecclesiastical parish; some were or became hamlets in themselves, whereas others have subsequently been divided.

After the English Civil War, when the Parliamentarians under Oliver Cromwell introduced a strongly Protestant regime, Catholicism remained the dominant religion in the area. Catholics, who had largely supported the Royalist side, were often considered to be traitors and efforts were made to eradicate the religion. The persecution even extended to Aberdaron and, in 1657, Gwen Griffiths of Y Rhiw was summoned to the Quarter Sessions as a "papist".

Rhoshirwaun Inclosure Act 1802
- Act of Parliament
- Parliament of the United Kingdom
- Long title: An Act for dividing, allotting and inclosing a Tract of Common and Waste Lands, called Rhoshirwaun, situate in the several Parishes of Aberdaron, Llanfaelrhys and Bryncroes, in the County of Caernarvon.
- Citation: 42 Geo. 3. c. xxx

Dates
- Royal assent: 15 April 1802

Text of statute as originally enacted

Agricultural improvement and the Industrial Revolution came to Aberdaron in the 19th century. The Inclosure (Consolidation) Act 1801 was intended to make it easier for landlords to enclose and improve common land, introduce increased efficiency, bring more land under the plough and reduce the high prices of agricultural production. Rhoshirwaun Common, following strong opposition, was enclosed in 1814; the process was not completed in Aberdaron, Llanfaelrhys and Y Rhiw until 1861. On the industrial front, mining developed as a major source of employment, especially at Y Rhiw, where manganese was discovered in 1827.

During the Second World War, Y Rhiw played a vital role in preparations for the Normandy landings. A team of electronic engineers set up an experimental ultra high frequency radio station, from where they were able to make a direct link to stations in Fishguard and Llandudno. The system employed a frequency that the German forces were unable to either monitor or jam, and was used in the 1944 landings.

== Governance ==
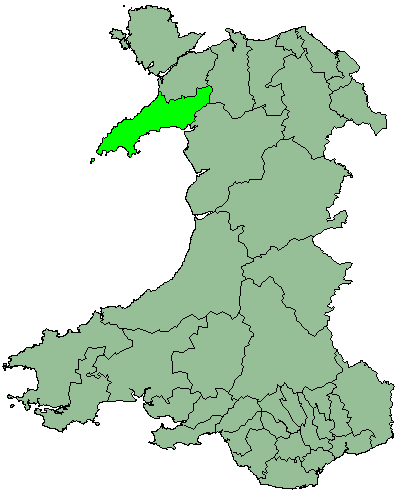
Between 1974 and 1996, Aberdaron formed part of Dwyfor District

Aberdaron, Bardsey Island, Bodferin, Llanfaelrhys and Y Rhiw were civil parishes in the commote of Cymydmaen within Cantref Llŷn, in Caernarfonshire. Following the Poor Law Amendment Act 1834, parishes were grouped into "unions": Pwllheli Poor Law Union was created in 1837. Under the Public Health Act 1848 the area of the poor law union became Pwllheli Rural Sanitary District, which from 1889 formed a second tier of local government under Caernarfonshire County Council. Y Rhiw was absorbed into the smaller Llanfaelrhys in 1886; and under the Local Government Act 1894 the four remaining parishes became part of Llŷn Rural District. Bodferin, Llanfaelrhys, and parts of Bryncroes and Llangwnnadl, were amalgamated into Aberdaron in 1934. Llŷn Rural District was abolished in 1974 and Bardsey Island was absorbed into Aberdaron; this formed a community within Dwyfor District in the new county of Gwynedd; Dwyfor was abolished as a local authority area when Gwynedd became a unitary authority in 1996.

The community now forms an electoral division of Gwynedd Council, electing one councillor; William Gareth Roberts of Plaid Cymru was re-elected in 2008. Aberdaron Community Council has 12 elected members, who represent three wards: Aberdaron De (English: Aberdaron South), Aberdaron Dwyrain (English: Aberdaron East) and Aberdaron Gogledd (English: Aberdaron North). Ten Independent councillors and one from Plaid Cymru were elected unopposed in the 2008 election.

From 1950, Aberdaron was part of Caernarfon UK parliamentary constituency; in 2010, the community was transferred to Dwyfor Meirionnydd constituency. In the Senedd, it has formed part of the Dwyfor Meirionnydd constituency since 2007, represented by Dafydd Elis-Thomas of Plaid Cymru, who was the Presiding Officer of the assembly until 2011. The constituency forms part of the electoral region of Mid and West Wales.

== Geography ==
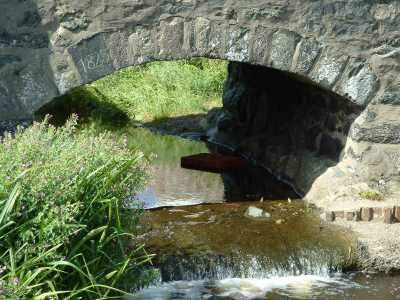
The bridge over the Afon Cyll-y-Felin was one of two built in 1823 in the centre of Aberdaron

Aberdaron stands on the shore of Aberdaron Bay in a small valley at the confluence of the Afon Daron and Afon Cyll-y-Felin, between the headlands of Uwchmynydd to the west and Trwyn y Penrhyn to the east. At the mouth of the bay stand two islands, Ynys Gwylan-Fawr and Ynys Gwylan-Fach, which are known together as Ynysoedd Gwylanod (English: Seagull Islands). Gwylan-Fawr reaches 108 feet (33 metres) in height. The Llŷn Peninsula is a marine eroded platform, an extension of the Snowdonia massif, with a complex geology including Precambrian rocks. The coastline is rocky, with crags, screes and low cliffs; heather-covered hills are separated by valleys occupied by pastures.

To the east, Mynydd Rhiw, Mynydd y Graig and Mynydd Penarfynydd form a 3 mi-long (5 km) series of hog-back ridges of igneous rock that reaches the sea at Trwyn Talfarach. Above 800 feet (240 m) the ridges are topped by hard gabbro. At its northern end, Mynydd Rhiw rises to 997 feet (304 m) and is a Marilyn. The outcrop of Clip y Gylfinhir (English: Curlew's Crag) looming above the village of Y Rhiw. Mynydd Penarfynydd is one of the best exposures of intrusive, layered, igneous rock in the British Isles.

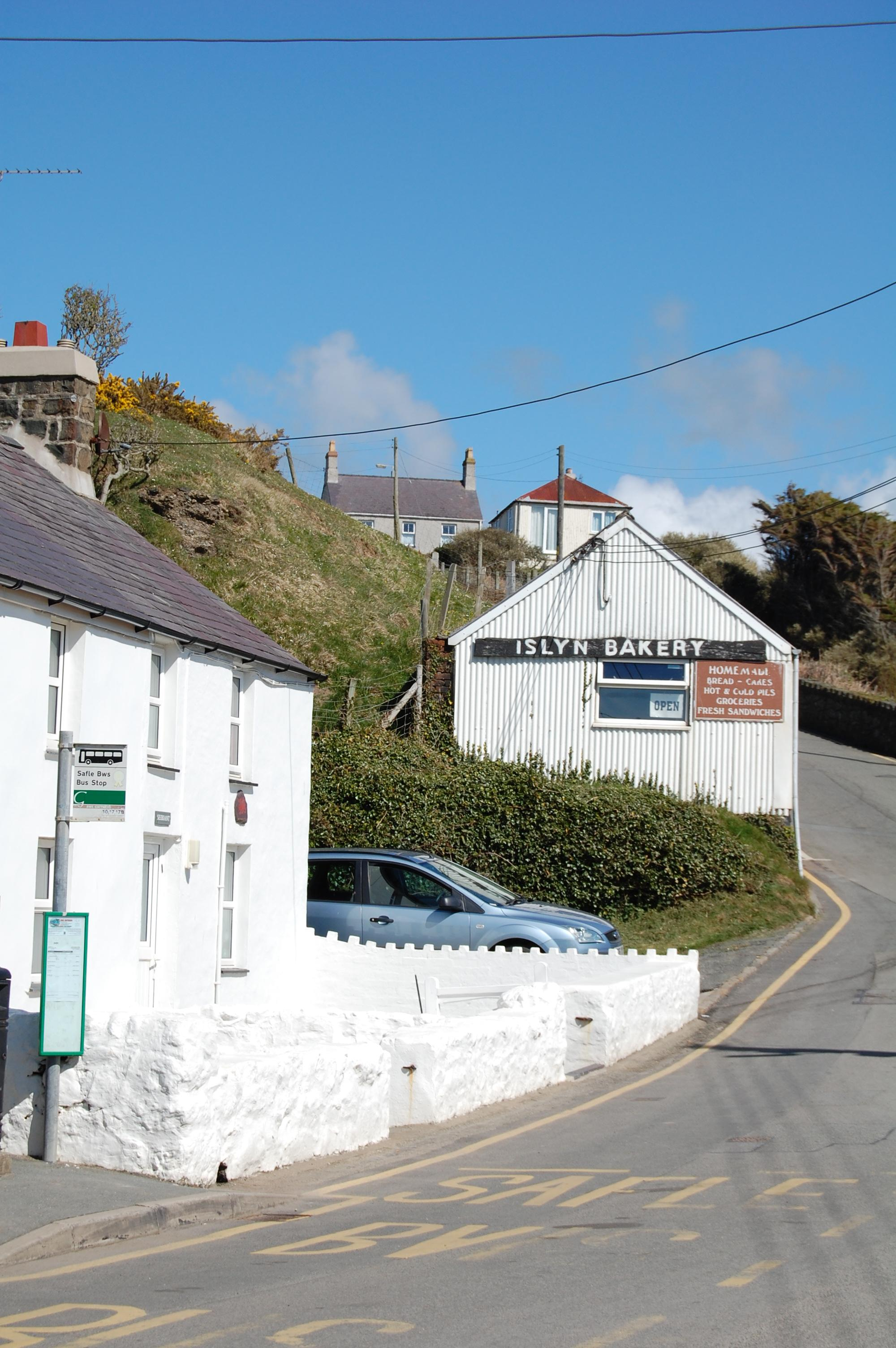
Islyn Bakery, built of corrugated iron, is on the main road to Pwllheli, which climbs steeply up the Daron Valley

East of Y Rhiw is an extensive low-lying plateau between 65 and 100 feet (20 and 30 m) and above sea level. The coastal rock is softer here and the sea has been free to erode the rock and boulder clay to form sand, resulting in the spacious beach of Porth Neigwl (or Hell's Mouth).

West of Aberdaron, four peaks rise above the rocky shoreline at Uwchmynydd. Mynydd Anelog stands 627 feet (191 m) high and another Marilyn, Mynydd Mawr at 525 feet (160 m); Mynydd y Gwyddel rises to 295 feet (90 m) and Mynydd Bychestyn is 330 feet (100 m) above sea level.

Bardsey Island lies 2 mi (3 km) off Pen y Cil, where there is another Marilyn; Mynydd Enlli. The island is 5/8 mile (1 km) wide and 1 mile (1.6 km) long. The north-east rises steeply from the sea to a height of 548 feet (167 m). In contrast, the western plain comprises low and relatively flat, cultivated farmland; in the south, the island narrows to an isthmus, connecting to a peninsula.

The coast around Aberdaron has been the scene of many shipwrecks. In 1822, the Bardsey Island lighthouse tender was wrecked, with the loss of six lives; in 1752, the schooner John the Baptist, carrying a cargo of oats from Wexford to Liverpool, was wrecked on the beach at Aberdaron. The sailing ship Newry, with 400 passengers bound from Warrenpoint to Québec, was wrecked at Porth Orion in 1880. The crew abandoned the passengers, leaving just the captain, ship's mate and one sailor, assisted by three local men, to lead 375 men, women and children to safety. A great storm swept the country on 26 October 1859 and many ships were lost; nine were wrecked at Porthor, seven of them with complete loss of life. On the south coast, vessels were often driven ashore at Porth Neigwl by a combination of south westerly gales and treacherous offshore currents. The Transit was lost in 1839, the Arfestone in the following year and the Henry Catherine in 1866. The bay earned its English title, Hell's Mouth, from its reputation for wrecks during the days of the sailing ship.

Aberdaron is noted for low levels of air pollution. The Gwynedd State of the Environment Report in 2004 found levels of sulphur dioxide, nitrogen dioxide and carbon monoxide to be very low, with particulates to be low. It is one of the few sites in the United Kingdom for golden hair lichen, a striking bright orange lichen that is very sensitive to air pollution. The climate is relatively mild and, because of the Gulf Stream, frosts are rare in winter.

=== Climate ===
Being situated at the west coast of the UK, Aberdaron has a distinct maritime climate, with mild winters and cool summers.

The number of frosts per year is very low, with an average of 5.9 days per year; this is comparable with coastal areas of Devon and Cornwall. The region, England NW and Wales N, averages 52.3 days, with March alone exceeding the average yearly amount of frost for Aberdaron. The village is generally quite windy throughout the year, particularly in autumn and winter. Sunshine amounts are higher than the Wales average. Rainfall is well below the Wales average.

A wind gust of 112 miles per hour (180 km/h) was recorded on 24 December 1997, which is one of the strongest gusts recorded in the UK.

Climate data for Aberdaron (1991–2020 normals)
Month	Jan	Feb	Mar	Apr	May	Jun	Jul	Aug	Sep	Oct	Nov	Dec	Year
Record high °C (°F)	12.4 (54.3)	16.4 (61.5)	18.7 (65.7)	22.9 (73.2)	28.4 (83.1)	31.6 (88.9)	29.5 (85.1)	30.2 (86.4)	27.2 (81.0)	21.3 (70.3)	17.4 (63.3)	14.2 (57.6)	31.6 (88.9)
Mean daily maximum °C (°F)	8.0 (46.4)	7.9 (46.2)	9.1 (48.4)	11.2 (52.2)	13.9 (57.0)	16.0 (60.8)	17.5 (63.5)	17.7 (63.9)	16.3 (61.3)	13.6 (56.5)	10.8 (51.4)	8.9 (48.0)	12.6 (54.7)
Daily mean °C (°F)	6.3 (43.3)	6.1 (43.0)	7.0 (44.6)	8.8 (47.8)	11.3 (52.3)	13.5 (56.3)	15.2 (59.4)	15.4 (59.7)	14.2 (57.6)	11.7 (53.1)	9.1 (48.4)	7.2 (45.0)	10.5 (50.9)
Mean daily minimum °C (°F)	4.6 (40.3)	4.3 (39.7)	4.9 (40.8)	6.3 (43.3)	8.7 (47.7)	11.0 (51.8)	12.8 (55.0)	13.2 (55.8)	12.1 (53.8)	9.8 (49.6)	7.3 (45.1)	5.4 (41.7)	8.4 (47.1)
Record low °C (°F)	−4.5 (23.9)	−5.1 (22.8)	−5.7 (21.7)	−1.9 (28.6)	1.1 (34.0)	4.7 (40.5)	8.4 (47.1)	8.6 (47.5)	4.9 (40.8)	0.8 (33.4)	−2.8 (27.0)	−3.8 (25.2)	−5.7 (21.7)
Average precipitation mm (inches)	83.4 (3.28)	66.2 (2.61)	60.8 (2.39)	58.3 (2.30)	51.3 (2.02)	60.5 (2.38)	62.9 (2.48)	75.2 (2.96)	74.4 (2.93)	104.6 (4.12)	121.7 (4.79)	98.3 (3.87)	917.5 (36.12)
Average precipitation days (≥ 1.0 mm)	14.4	12.0	11.8	11.0	9.6	9.3	10.1	11.3	11.3	14.4	16.7	15.1	147.0
Mean monthly sunshine hours	60.5	81.4	126.8	183.4	247.3	213.5	201.5	185.0	152.3	104.2	61.7	43.2	1,660.6
Source 1: Met Office
Source 2: Starlings Roost Weather

== Economy ==
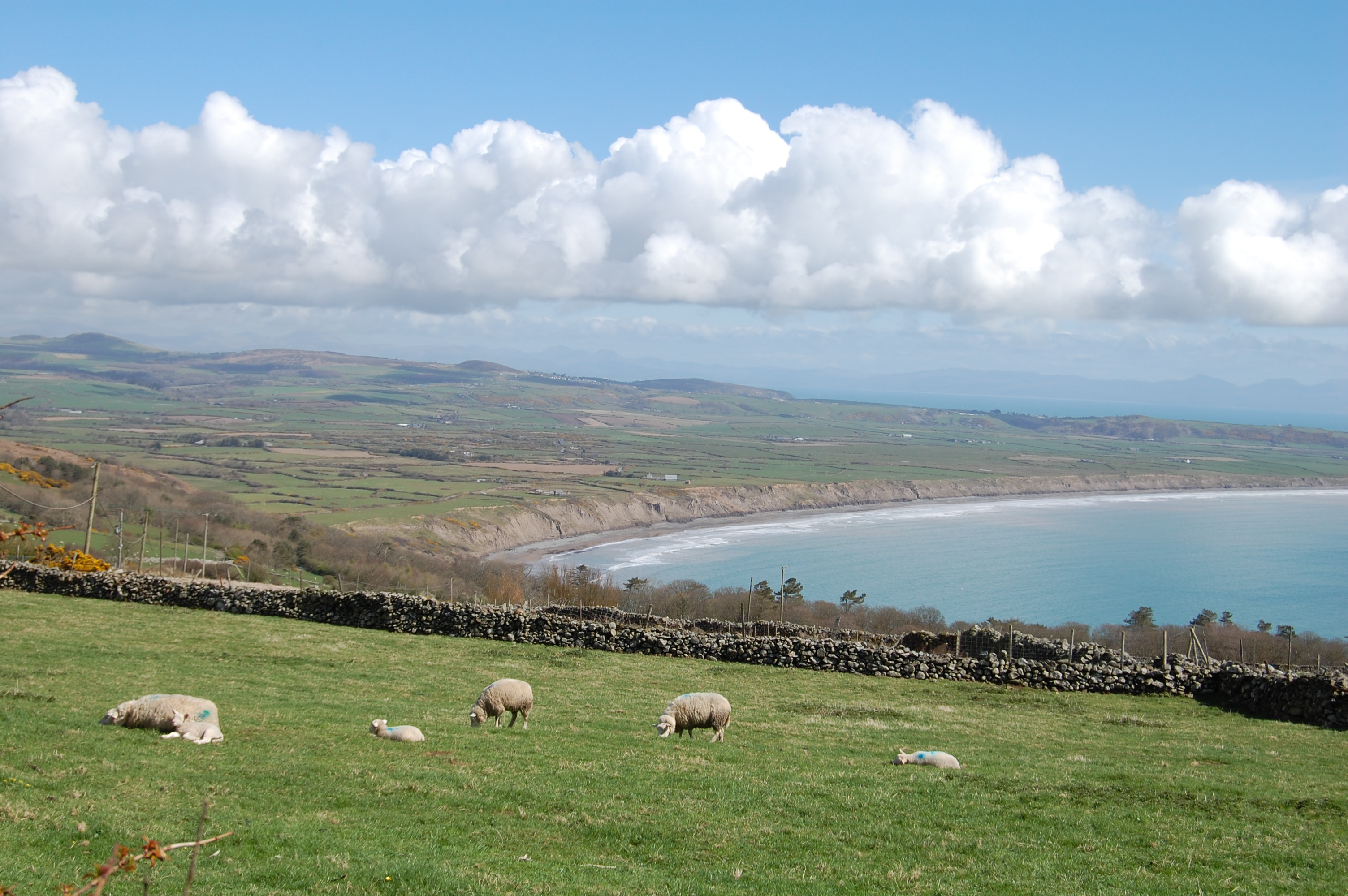
Sheep graze on the rise above Porth Neigwl where wrecking took place

Sheep have been raised in the Llŷn Peninsula for over a thousand years; Aberdaron has produced and exported wool for many years. The main product locally was felt, produced by soaking the cloth in water and beating it with large wooden paddles until the wool formed a thick mat which could be flattened, dried and cut into lengths. There were two fulling mills on the Afon Daron, in addition to three corn mills, and lichen was gathered around Y Rhiw, from which a grey dye was extracted. Arable crops consisted mainly of wheat, barley, oats and potatoes. The field boundaries date back several centuries and are marked by walls, cloddiau and hedgerows: important habitats for a variety of wildlife.

Wrecking and smuggling supplemented local incomes. In 1743, John Roberts and Huw Bedward from Y Rhiw were found guilty of the murder of two shipwrecked sailors on the beach at Porth Neigwl on 6 January 1742 and were hanged; Jonathan Morgan had been killed by a knife thrust into the nape of his neck and Edward Halesham, described as a boy, had been choked to death. A ship claimed to be from France unloaded illicit tea and brandy at Aberdaron in 1767; it attempted to sell its cargo to the locals; a Revenue cutter discovered salt being smuggled at Porth Cadlan in 1809; a schooner en route from Guernsey to Scotland was reported to have offloaded lace, tea, brandy and gin at Y Rhiw in 1824.

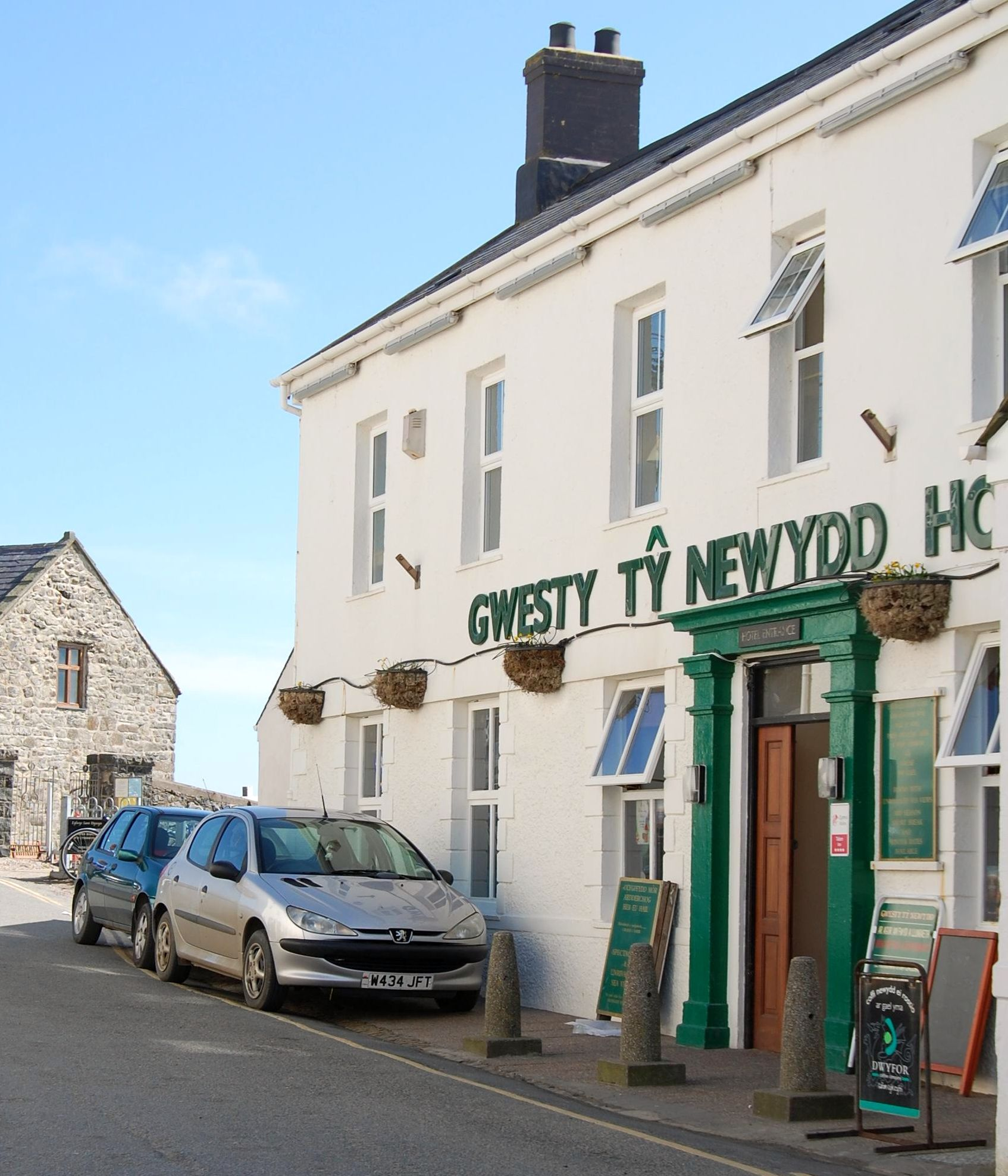
Tŷ Newydd Hotel is one of two hotels in Aberdaron

During the 19th century, good-quality limestone and a small amount of lead ore were quarried in the village. Jasper was mined at Carreg; granite was quarried at Porth y Pistyll; and there was a brickworks at Porth Neigwl. The main source of income, however, was herring fishing. A regular shipping service was operated to Liverpool, exporting pigs, poultry and eggs; the vessels returned laden with coal for the neighbourhood. Limestone was also imported and offloaded into the water at high tide, then collected from the beach when the tide went out. Lime was needed to reduce the acidity of the local soil and lime kilns were built on the beaches at Porthor, Porth Orion, Porth Meudwy, Aberdaron and Y Rhiw to convert the limestone to quicklime. There was shipbuilding at Porth Neigwl, where the last ship, a sloop named the Ebenezer, was built in 1841; at Porthor, which came to an end with the building of a schooner, the Sarah, in 1842. Aberdaron's last ship, the sloop Victory, had been built in 1792, and the last ship to come out of Porth Ysgo had been another sloop, the Grace, in 1778.

The outbreak of the First World War resulted in a great demand for manganese as a strengthening agent for steel. Ore had been discovered at Y Rhiw in 1827 and the industry became a substantial employer in the village; over 113,000 long tons (115,000 tonnes) of ore were extracted between 1840 and 1945, and in 1906 the industry employed 200 people.

Tourism began to develop after 1918. The first tourist guide to the village was published in 1910 and extolled the virtues of "the salubrious sea and mountain breezes"; in addition to the two hotels in the village, local farmhouses took in visitors, which provided an extra source of income.

At the 2001 Census, 59.4% of the population were in employment, 23.5% were self-employed, the unemployment rate was 2.3% and 16.0% were retired. Of those employed, 17.7% worked in agriculture; 15.8% in the wholesale and retail trades; 10.7% in construction; and 10.5% in education. Those working from home amounted to 32.3%, 15.2% travelled less than 6 mi (10 km) to their place of work and 23.6% travelled more than 25 miles (40 km). The community is included in Pwllheli and Llŷn Regeneration Area and was identified in the Welsh Index of Multiple Deprivation 2005 as the electoral division in Gwynedd with least access to services; it was ranked 13th in Wales. An agricultural census in 2000 recorded 33,562 sheep, 4,380 calves, 881 beef cattle, 607 dairy cattle and 18 pigs; there were 310 acres (130 ha) of growing crops.

== Demography ==
Aberdaron had a population of 896 in 2021, of which 19.1% were below the age of 17 and 53.5% were over 65 years of age. In 2001, owner occupiers inhabited 53.7% of the dwellings, 21.7% were rented and 19.6% were holiday homes. Central heating was installed in 62.8% of dwellings, but 2.4% were without sole use of a bath, shower or toilet. The proportion of households without use of a vehicle was 14.3%, but 40.9% had two or more. The population was predominantly White British, 98.5% identified themselves as such in 2021, 71.9% were born in Wales and 26.9% in England. The 2021 census revealed that 70.4% of residents identify themselves as Welsh speakers.

Population change in Aberdaron
Year	1801	1811	1821	1831	1841	1851	1861	1871	1881	1891
Aberdaron	1,141	1,442	1,234	1,389	1,350	1,239	1,266	1,247	1,202	1,170
Bardsey Island		71	86	84	90	92	81	84	132	77
Bodferin	58	87	61	56	64	57	50	62	42	45
Llanfaelrhys	224	246	262	258	236	255	208	198	186	490
Y Rhiw	282	318	380	358	378	376	370	340	350	
Total	1,705	2,164	2,023	2,145	2,118	2,019	1,975	1,931	1,912	1,782
Year	1901	1911	1921	1931	1951	1961	2001	2011	2021	
Aberdaron	1,119	1,106	1,075	983	1,275	1,161	1,019	965	896	
Bardsey Island	124	53	58	54	14	17				
Bodferin	49	43	43	36						
Llanfaelrhys	499	495	449	385						
Y Rhiw										
Total	1,791	1,697	1,625	1,458	1,289	1,178	1,019	965		

== Landmarks ==
It is sometimes referred to as the "Land's End of North Wales" or, in Welsh, Pendraw'r Byd (roughly "far end of the world").

=== Aberdaron ===
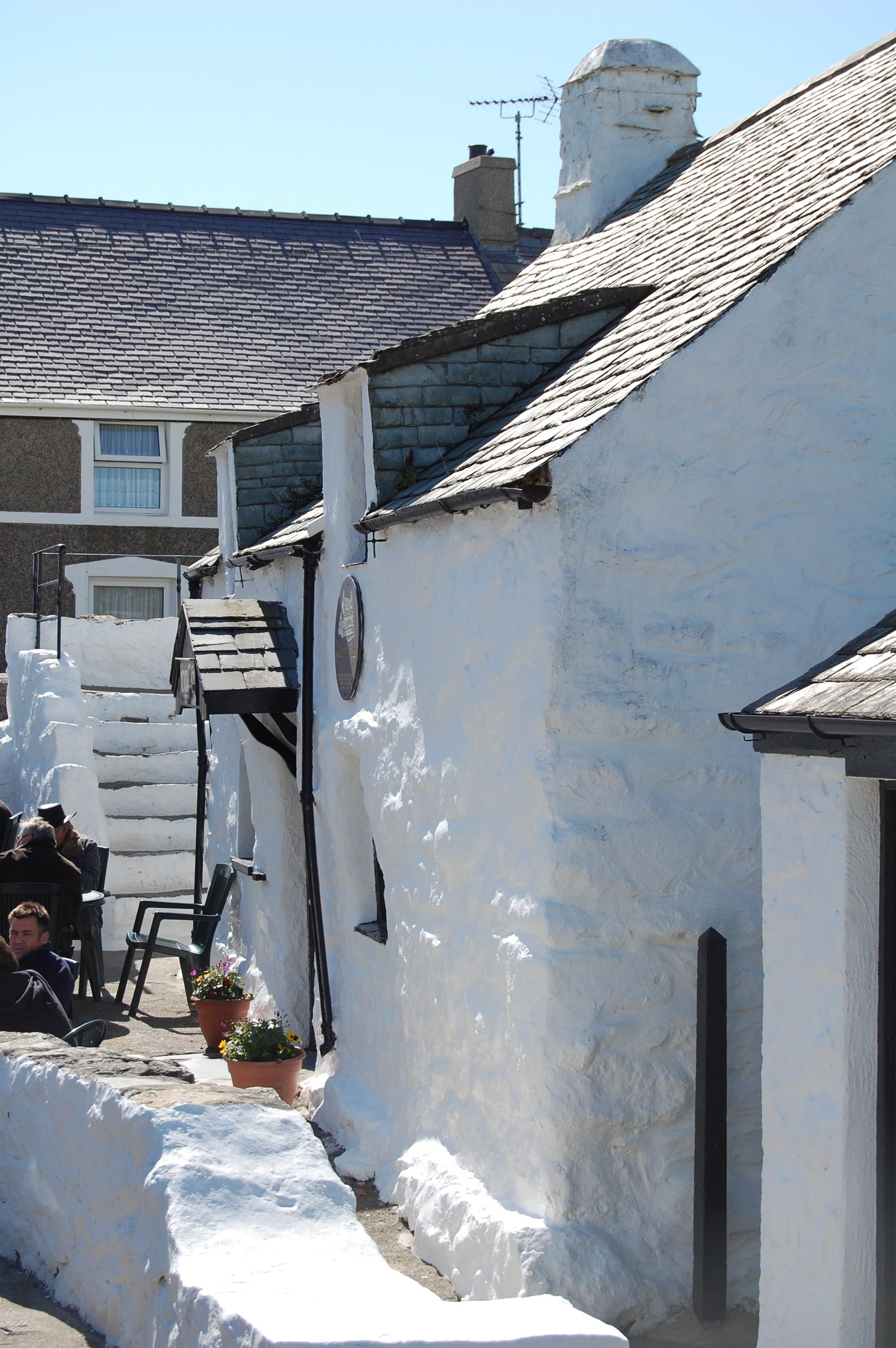
Y Gegin Fawr, built in the 13th century for pilgrims, now serves as a tearoom

Two stone bridges, Pont Fawr (English: Large Bridge) and Pont Fach (English: Small Bridge), built in 1823, cross the Afon Daron and Afon Cyll y Felin in the centre of Aberdaron. Beyond the bridges, the road opens up to create a small market square. The Old Post Office was designed by Portmeirion architect Clough Williams-Ellis.

Y Gegin Fawr (English: The Big Kitchen) was built in the 13th century, as a communal kitchen where pilgrims could claim a meal on their way to Bardsey Island. Aberdaron was the last place on the route for rest and refreshment and pilgrims often had to wait weeks in the village for a chance to cross the treacherous waters of Bardsey Sound (Welsh: Swnt Enlli).

One mile up the road towards Porth Meudwy is Cae y Grogbren (English: Gallows Field), near to which is a large red rock. In the Middle Ages, the abbot from the monastery on Bardsey Island visited the rock to dispense justice to local criminals; if they were found guilty, the wrongdoer would be hanged and thrown into Pwll Ddiwaelod (English: The Bottomless Pool). The pool is a kettle lake, formed at the end of the Ice Age, when blocks of ice were trapped underground and melted to form round, deep pools.

Above the village, on the Afon Daron, stands Bodwrdda, an early 16th-century stone-built house, which had a fulling mill adjacent; two large brick-built wings were added later, giving an imposing three-storey facade containing 17th-century windows. To the south, Penrhyn Mawr is a substantial late-18th-century gable-fronted farmhouse.

The National Trust maintains a visitors' centre at Porth y Swnt, which was opened in 2014.

=== Bardsey Island ===
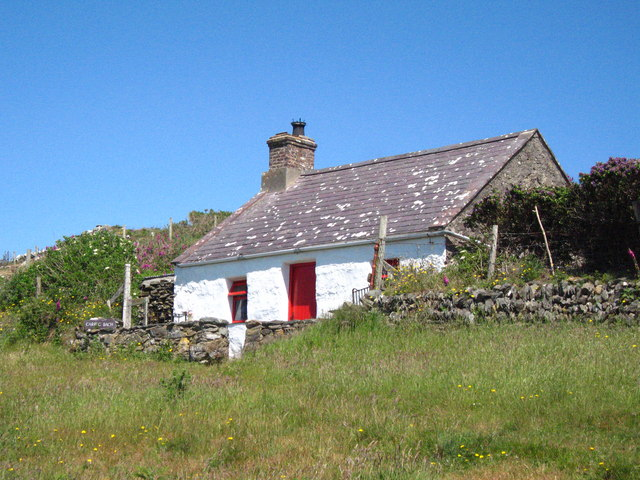
Restored cottages on Bardsey Island

Bardsey Island, 2 mi (3 km) off the mainland, was inhabited in Neolithic times, and traces of hut circles remain. During the 5th century, the island became a refuge for persecuted Christians and a small Celtic monastery existed. Saint Cadfan arrived from Brittany in 516 and, under his guidance, St Mary's Abbey was built. For centuries, the island was important as "the holy place of burial for all the bravest and best in the land". Bards called it "the land of indulgences, absolution and pardon, the road to Heaven and the gate to Paradise", and, in medieval times, three pilgrimages to Bardsey Island were considered to be of equivalent benefit to the soul as one to Rome. In 1188, the abbey was still a Celtic institution but, by 1212 it belonged to the Augustinians. Many people still walk to Aberdaron and Uwchmynydd each year in the footsteps of the saints, although only ruins of the old abbey's 13th-century bell tower remain today. A Celtic cross amidst the ruins commemorates the 20,000 saints reputed to be buried on the island.

The island was declared a national nature reserve in 1986 and is part of Aberdaron Coast and Bardsey Island Special Protection Area. It is now a favourite bird-watching location, on the migration routes of thousands of birds. Bardsey Bird and Field Observatory (Welsh: Gwylfa Maes ac Adar Ynys Enlli), founded in 1953, nets and rings 8,000 birds each year to understand their migration patterns.

Bardsey Island Trust bought the island in 1979 after an appeal supported by the Church in Wales and many Welsh academics and public figures. The trust is financed through membership subscriptions, grants and donations; it is dedicated to protecting the wildlife, buildings and archaeological sites of the island; promoting its artistic and cultural life; and encouraging people to visit as a place of natural beauty and pilgrimage. When, in 2000, the trust advertised for a tenant for the 440-acre (180 ha) sheep farm on the island, they had 1,100 applications. The tenancy is now held by the Royal Society for the Protection of Birds; and the land is managed to maintain the natural habitat. Oats, turnips and swedes are grown; goats, ducks, geese and chickens kept; and there is a mixed flock of sheep and Welsh Black cattle.

The Whale and Dolphin Conservation Society has been working on cetaceans in the region. Several species, most notably bottlenose dolphins, can be observed from the shores.

=== Llanfaelrhys ===
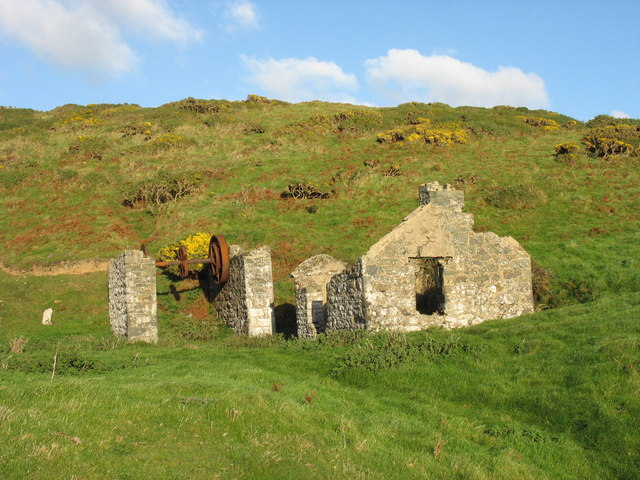
The manganese mine at Nant y Gadwen, which closed in 1927

Porth Ysgo, owned by the National Trust, is reached by a steep slope from Llanfaelrhys, 3 1/4 miles (5 km) east of Aberdaron, past a disused manganese mine in Nant y Gadwen. The mine employed 200 people in 1906; the ore was used as a strengthening agent for steel. The mine closed in 1927, and produced 45,644 long tons (46,376 t) in its lifetime. Where the path from Ysgo reaches the beach, a waterfall, Pistyll y Gaseg, tumbles over the cliff. At the eastern end of the bay is Porth Alwm, where the stream from Nant y Gadwen flows into the sea. The south-facing beach is composed of fine, firm sand.

To the west, King Arthur's last battle against his arch enemy, Mordred, was supposedly fought in the fields around Porth Cadlan. Offshore lies a rock, Maen Gwenonwy, named after Arthur's sister.

Lladron Maelrhys are two large stones on the border between Llanfaelrhys and Y Rhiw. It is claimed that, years ago, thieves broke into St Maelrhys Church, intent on stealing money. Caught in the act, they fled for their lives but were caught as they approached Y Rhiw, and killed on the spot; the stones mark their burial place. Another version claims that, as they crossed the parish boundary, they were turned to stone for their sacrilege.

=== Porthor ===
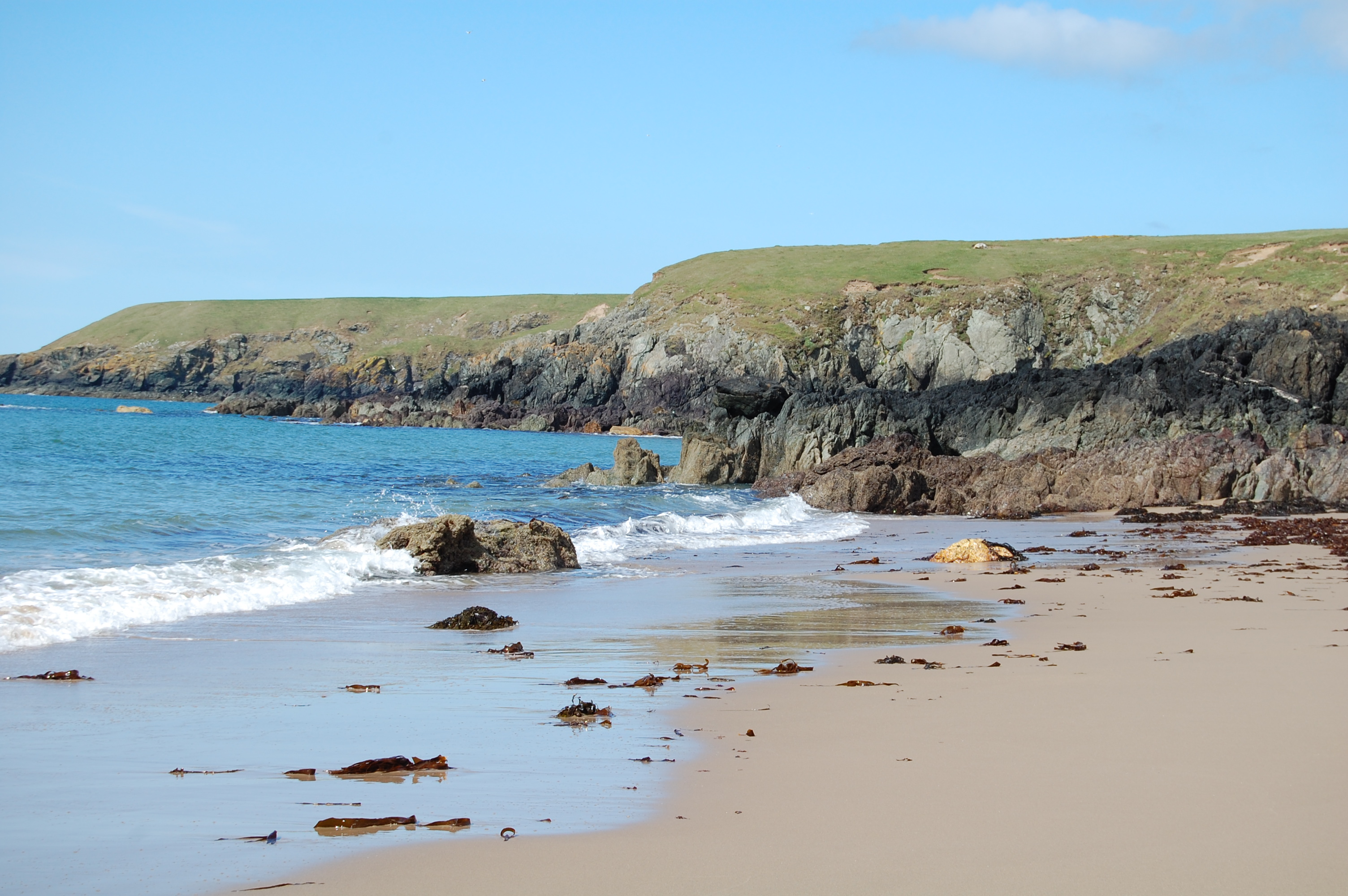
The beach at Porthor is part of a 420-acre (170 ha) coastal estate owned by the National Trust

Porthor (English: Whistling Sands) is a cove 3 1/4 miles (5 km) north of Aberdaron that has smooth white sand; when dry, the sand whistles or squeaks, underfoot. The crescent-shaped beach is backed by steep cliffs of relatively hard rock, from which the cove has been sculpted by the rough seas. The bay is the centre of a National Trust estate comprising 420 acres (170 ha) of shoreline, headland and farmland; it includes Mynydd Carreg and Mynydd Anelog.

To the south are Dinas Bach and Dinas Mawr, twin peninsulas formed from weathered pillow lavas 600 million years old, thought to have been early fortified sites from the Iron Age. Kittiwakes, cormorants and shags can be seen on the cliffs, while farm birds such as the yellowhammer frequent the gorse. On Mynydd Anelog, experimental plots have been marked out to monitor different methods of managing heather to discover the best way the habitat can be conserved for the future.

North of Porthor is Porth Iago, a south-facing narrow inlet and rocky cove, which has a small beach and steep cliffs.

=== Rhoshirwaun ===
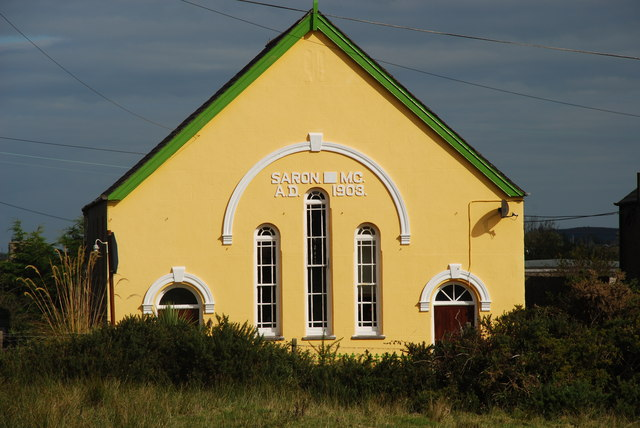
Capel Saron at Rhoshirwaun was opened in 1903 by the Calvinistic Methodists.

Rhoshirwaun lies two miles (three kilometres) northeast of Aberdaron, and was formerly a marshy area. It provided fuel from peat cuttings, pasture for animals and accommodated squatters, mainly fishermen, who had encroached on the common with the tacit acceptance of the community. An inclosure act was drawn up in 1802, designed to remove all squatters who had been there less than 20 years. Resistance to the evictions was fierce and was only suppressed by a contingent of dragoons. The act was finally applied in 1814; new roads were built across the moor; boundaries were established; allotments allocated; and wetland reclaimed.

Castell Odo, on Mynydd Ystum, is one of Europe's earliest Iron Age Settlements, standing 480 feet (150 m) above sea level. The hillfort, 165 feet (50 m) in diameter, has visible traces of eight circular huts; pottery found on the site dates from 425 BC. Legend has it that a giant, Odo Gawr, is buried under a cairn of stones on the summit; nearby is a huge rock known as Carreg Samson, supposedly thrown from Uwchmynydd by Samson. The holes in the rock are said to be the imprint of his fingers; a pot of gold reputedly lies underneath.

To the east of the village, Felin Uchaf is an educational centre exploring ways of living and working in partnership with the environment. Developed on a redundant farm, it provides residential courses in rural skills and sustainable agriculture. A traditional Iron Age roundhouse has been built on the site.

=== Uwchmynydd ===
Uwchmynydd, 1 3/4 miles (3 km) south-west of Aberdaron, has a long history of human settlement. Mesolithic flints have been found in the area and a Neolithic stone axe was discovered on Mynydd Mawr. Hut circles are visible on the summits and part of a Roman anchor was recovered off Trwyn Bychestyn.

At Mynydd Mawr, the picnic site has views which, on a fine day, take in Cardigan Bay, Bardsey Island and the Wicklow Mountains; at night, South Stack Lighthouse is visible in the distance. A road to the summit, owned by the National Trust, was built during the Second World War to provide access to the heights, where men were posted to give early warning to Liverpool of Luftwaffe air raids. The former Coastguard lookout point, manned for almost 80 years before becoming redundant in 1990, provides views over Bardsey Sound to the island. The hut contains an exhibition to the natural history of the area and a mural created by local children.

The headland at Braich y Pwll is the only known location on the British mainland of the spotted rock rose, which produces bright yellow petals that last only one day. The coast here has open grass heath land and mountain, giving way to rugged sea cliffs and coves. There is a profusion of wildlife; it is an ideal vantage point to watch the spring and autumn bird migrations. Choughs, peregrine falcons, kestrels, puffins, stonechats, guillemots and Manx shearwaters can be seen; dolphins, porpoises and seals can be spotted in the water.

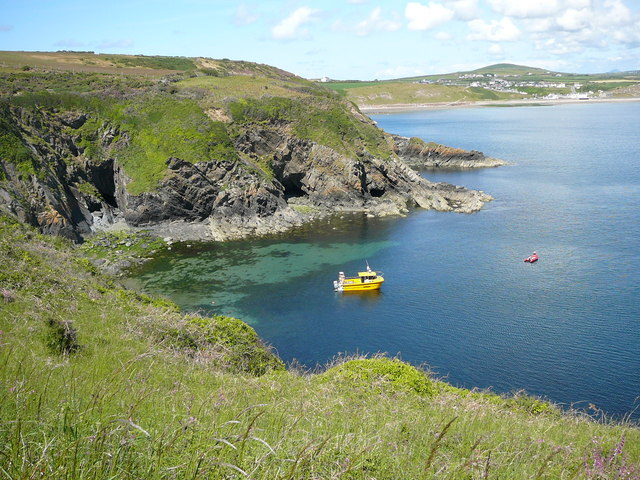
Porth Meudwy is the traditional embarkation point for pilgrims heading to Bardsey Island

Above the sea cliffs are the remains of Capel Mair (English: St Mary's Chapel), where it was customary for pilgrims to invoke the protection of the Virgin Mary before making the dangerous crossing to Bardsey Island. At the foot of Mynydd Mawr is Ffynnon Fair (English: St Mary's Well), the last stop for pilgrims crossing to the island; the well is a freshwater spring which is covered twice daily by the sea, emerging from the ebbing tide with crystal clear water.

Cwrt (English: Court), now a large farm, was the administrative centre of Bardsey Abbey's mainland estates and was known as the "Court of Bardsey". The steepest cliffs in the Llŷn Peninsula are at Y Parwyd, the scene of a local ghost story. In 1794, a newly-married couple moved into a cottage nearby. Within a few years, they were disturbed by a phantom, but when they read a verse from the Bible, the phantom would retreat towards Y Parwyd and hover over the cliff edge before disappearing; the couple finally moved to Bodferin. In 1801, a ship pilot was put ashore on the rocks below the cliffs. Although very drunk, he managed to climb the cliff face and, reaching the top, fell asleep in a sheep pen. In the early morning, he awoke and, still drunk, headed for home; however, he walked in the wrong direction and disappeared over the cliff edge into the sea.

The traditional embarkation point for pilgrims crossing to Bardsey Island was at Porth Meudwy (English: Hermit's Cove), now a lobster fishing cove. Further south is Porth y Pistyll, which has good views of Ynysoedd Gwylanod, home to puffin and guillemot colonies; and Pen y Cil, where the Precambrian pillow lavas are exposed, revealing how they have been contorted over time.

=== Y Rhiw ===
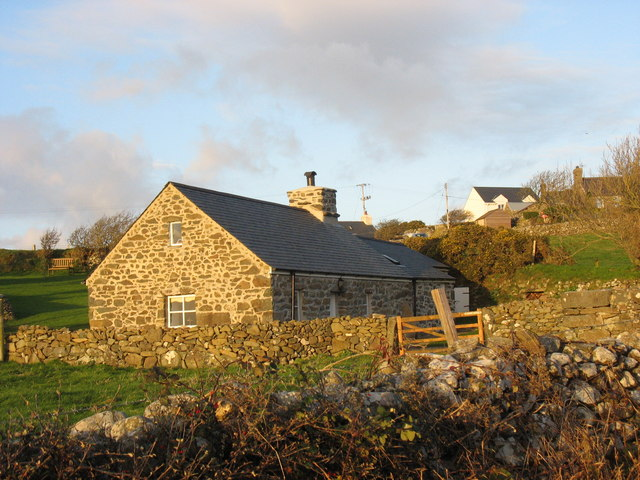
Bwlch y Garreg Wen at Y Rhiw

The mountain-top hamlet of Y Rhiw is four miles (six kilometres) to the east. There are fine views of Llŷn towards Snowdonia. On the slopes of Mynydd Rhiw is a late Stone Age burial chamber, and Neolithic quarries. Nearby on Mynydd y Graig are three hillforts, several hut circles and terraced fields that are thought to date from the late Iron Age; in 1955, a Bronze Age cinerary urn was uncovered in the village.

Plas yn Rhiw, owned by the National Trust, is an early 17th-century house that was restored by the Keating sisters in 1939, with advice from Clough Williams-Ellis. It is believed that the house is on or near the site of an earlier defended house, built by Meirion Goch in the 10th century to prevent incursions by Vikings into Porth Neigwl.

Bwlch y Garreg Wen at Y Rhiw, built in 1731, is a croglofft cottage, a type of agricultural worker's house found in Llŷn.

== Transport ==
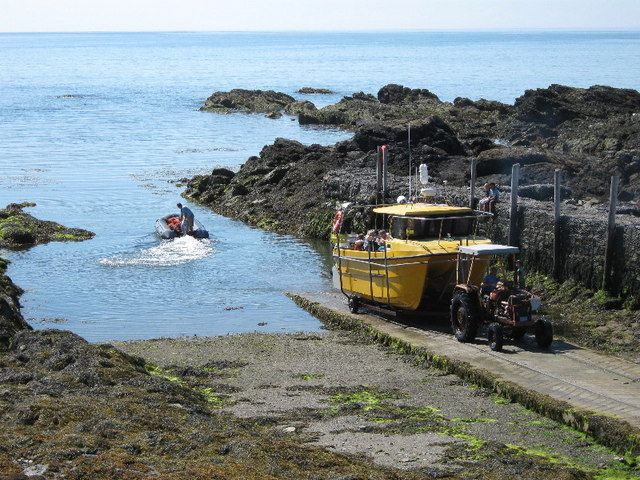
The passenger ferry arriving at Bardsey Island from Porth Meudwy

Aberdaron lies at the western end of the B4413 road. The road runs east to Llanbedrog, where it connects with the A499 Pwllheli to Abersoch road.

Bardsey Boat Trips operates passenger ferries between Porth Meudwy and Bardsey Island. These are supplemented by Enlli Charters, which sails between Pwllheli and the island. At low tide, the ferry boat has to be hauled up to the boathouse by specialised equipment before passengers can disembark.

Bus routes are operated by two companies, with Nefyn Coaches running along route 8B, between Pwllheli and Rhydlios and Berwyn, which operates along routes 17 and 17B to Pwllheli.

The nearest National Rail station is at Pwllheli, about 15 miles (24 km) to the east; it is the western terminus of the Cambrian Coast Line. Transport for Wales operates services to Machynlleth, with some trains continuing to Shrewsbury and Birmingham International.

== Public services ==
Water and sanitation are provided by Dŵr Cymru (English: Welsh Water), owned by Glas Cymru, a company limited by guarantee. The electricity distribution company is Scottish Power, a subsidiary of the Basque utility Iberdrola.

Welsh Ambulance Services provide ambulance and paramedic services; and North West Wales NHS Trust is responsible for hospital services. The nearest community hospital is Ysbyty Bryn Beryl at Pwllheli; for 24-hour accident and emergency services, the nearest provision is at Ysbyty Gwynedd in Bangor. The general provision of health services is the responsibility of Gwynedd Local Health Board.

Law enforcement is the responsibility of North Wales Police, formed in 1967 as Gwynedd Constabulary. North Wales Fire and Rescue Service was created in 1996 by the merger of the Gwynedd and Clwyd fire brigades; it provides public protection services, operating out of the fire station at Abersoch.

== Education ==
In the early 19th century, there was a school for poor children, which moved in a four-year cycle between Aberdaron, Llanfaelrhys, Bryncroes and Y Rhiw. The Elementary Education Act 1870 provided for local school boards, but was opposed by the established church. The process of establishing boards was lengthy and the government had to enforce the regulations in Aberdaron, Llanfaelrhys and Y Rhiw; the national school opened at Y Rhiw in 1877 and had 74 pupils on its register; it closed in 1965.

Primary education is now provided by Ysgol Crud y Werin in Aberdaron, which has 54 pupils, and by Ysgol Llidiardau in Rhoshirwaun, which was established in 1880 and has 21 pupils. However Ysgol Llidiardau closed in 2013. The last inspection of Ysgol Crud y Werin, by Estyn in 2008, there were no pupils entitled to free school meals and 84% came from homes where Welsh was the main spoken language; Welsh is the main medium of teaching. Ysgol Llidiardau was last inspected in 2009; 18% of pupils were entitled to free school meals and 36% came from homes where Welsh was the predominant language. Secondary school pupils mainly attend Ysgol Botwnnog.

== Culture ==
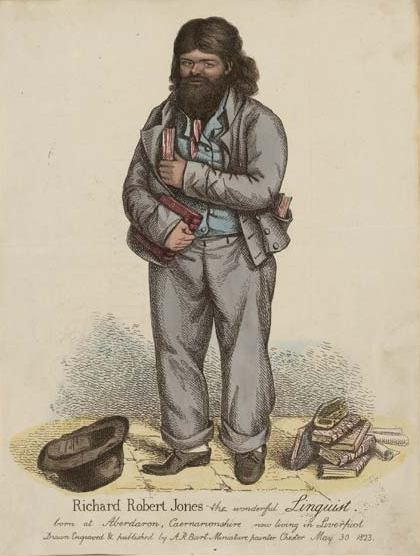
Dic Aberdaron, the subject of an R. S. Thomas poem, was born in Aberdaron

Aberdaron is a predominantly Welsh-speaking community; 75.2% of the population speak the language. A mobile library visits a number of sites in the community each week; and Llanw Llŷn, a papur bro published in Abersoch, serves the area; the local English newspapers are the Caernarfon and Denbigh Herald, published in Caernarfon; and the Cambrian News, published in Aberystwyth. Summer harp recitals and concerts are held in St Hywyn's Church; Gŵyl Pen Draw'r Byd (English: The Land's End Festival) is an annual event, which includes beach side concerts and competitions on the shore, with an evening concert at Morfa Mawr Farm; Gŵyl Pentre Coll (English: The Lost Village Festival), a festival of contemporary acoustic music, has been held since 2008 at Felin Uchaf in Rhoshirwaun; and a local eisteddfod, Eisteddfod Flynyddol Uwchmynydd, is held at Ysgol Crud y Werin.

The poet R. S. Thomas was the vicar of St Hywyn's Church from 1967 to 1978; when he retired, he lived for some years in Y Rhiw. An ardent Welsh nationalist who learned to speak Welsh, his poetry was based on his religious faith. In 1995, he was nominated for the Nobel Prize in Literature, and he was widely regarded as the best religious poet of his time. A festival devoted to the work of RS Thomas and his wife, the artist ME Eldridge, takes place in the village every June. The subject of one of Thomas's poems, Richard Robert Jones, better known as "Dic Aberdaron", was born in the village in 1780. Despite very little formal education, he is said to have been fluent in 14 languages and spent years traveling the country accompanied by his books and his cat.

William Rowlands won a prize at the National Eisteddfod in 1922, for an adventure story written for boys. The book, Y Llong Lo (English: The Coal Ship), was published in 1924, and told the story of two boys who stow away on one of the ships that brought coal to Porth Neigwl.

During the early 1920s, South African poet Roy Campbell and his aristocratic English wife Mary Garman lived in a croglofft cottage" above Porth Ysgo. According to his biographer, Joseph Pearce, Roy and Mary Campbell shocked the local population with their flashy, colourful clothing, unkempt appearances and lack of bashfulness about nudity and sex. Furthermore, the Campbell's first child, their daughter Teresa, was born, with assistance of a local midwife, inside the cottage during the stormy night of 26 November 1922. Campbell's first widely successful and popular poem, The Flaming Terrapin, was completed in the cottage and mailed to its publisher from Aberdaron, after which Campbell was widely praised and long afterward considered to be one of the best poets of the Interwar period.

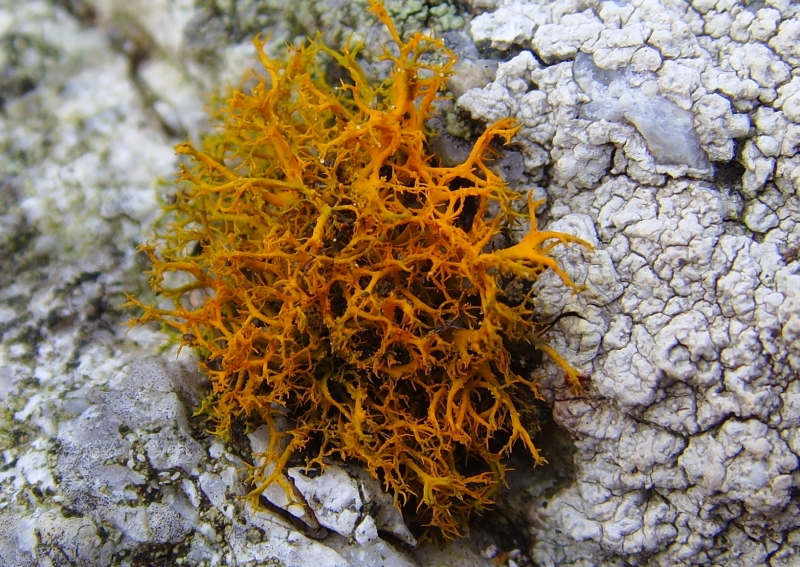
Golden hair lichen from Aberdaron was likened by poet Dafydd Nanmor to the colour of his loved one's hair

Considered one of the most significant Welsh poets of the 15th century, Dafydd Nanmor, in Gwallt Llio, compared the striking yellow colour of the rocks at Uwchmynydd, covered by golden hair lichen, to the colour of his loved one's hair. Lewys Daron, a 16th-century poet best known for his elegy to friend and fellow poet Tudur Aled, is thought to have been born in Aberdaron. In the 18th century Anne Griffith was a local healer who was an early advocate of the use of fox-glove for heart conditions. She was born in 1734 and lived all her adult life at Bryn Canaid in Uwchmynydd, where she would collect plants, cheese, apple mold and local manganese to make remedies. She died in 1821, but details are known of her work due to a local historian.

Yorkshire-born poet Christine Evans lives half the year on Bardsey Island and spends the winters at Uwchmynydd. She moved to Pwllheli as a teacher and married into a Bardsey Island farming family. On maternity leave in 1976, she started writing poems; her first book was published seven years later. Cometary Phrases was Welsh Book of the Year 1989 and she was the winner of the inaugural Roland Mathias Prize in 2005.

Edgar Ewart Pritchard, an amateur film-maker from Brownhills, produced The Island in the Current, a colour film of life on Bardsey Island, in 1953; a copy of the film is held by the National Screen and Sound Archive of Wales. A candle lantern, discovered in 1946 in a cowshed at Y Rhiw, is now displayed in St Fagans National History Museum; and Iron Age pottery found at Castell Odo is on display at Gwynedd Museum and Art Gallery in Bangor.

Dilys Cadwaladr, the former school teacher on Bardsey Island, became the first woman to win the Crown at the National Eisteddfod in 1953 for her long poem Y Llen; and artist Brenda Chamberlain twice won the gold medal for Art at the Eisteddfod; some of the murals she painted can still be seen on the walls of Carreg, her island home from 1947 to 1962. Wildlife artist Kim Atkinson, whose work has been widely exhibited in Wales and England, spent her childhood on the island and returned to live there in the 1980s.

Since 1999, Bardsey Island Trust has appointed an Artist in Residence to spend several weeks on the island producing work which is later exhibited on the mainland. A Welsh literary residence was created in 2002; singer-songwriter Fflur Dafydd spent six weeks working on a collection of poetry and prose. Her play Hugo was inspired by her stay, and she has produced two novels, Atyniad (English: Attraction), which won the prose medal at the 2006 Eisteddfod; and Twenty Thousand Saints, winner of the Oxfam Hay Prize, which tells how the women of the island, starved of men, turn to each other.

It was tradition for Bardsey Island to elect the "King of Bardsey" (Welsh: Brenin Enlli) and, from 1820 onwards, he would be crowned by Baron Newborough or his representative; the crown is now kept at Merseyside Maritime Museum in Liverpool, although calls have been made for it to return to Gwynedd. At the outbreak of the First World War, the last king, Love Pritchard, offered himself and the men of the island for military service, but he was refused as he was considered too old at the age of 71; Pritchard took umbrage and declared the island to be a neutral power. In 1925 Pritchard left the island for the mainland, to seek a less laborious way of life, but died the following year.

Owen Griffith, a qualified pharmacist from Penycaerau, who was known as the "Doctor of the Wild Wart", used a traditional herbalist remedy to cure basal cell carcinoma, also known as rodent ulcer; the remedy had supposedly been passed on to the family 300 years earlier by an Irish tinker. In 1932, a woman died while receiving treatment and, even though the inquest into her death found that no blame was apportioned to the treatment, the Chief Medical Officer for Caernarfonshire vociferously condemned the treatment in the press. Former patients came out in support of the pharmacist and petitions were sent to the Department of Health demanding that a medical licence be granted to Griffith and his cousin.

There are several folk tales of the Tylwyth Teg, the fairy people who inhabited the area and an invisible land in Cardigan Bay. One tells of a farmer from Aberdaron who was in the habit of stepping outside his house before retiring to bed. One night, he was spoken to by a stranger, who asked why the farmer was annoyed by him. The farmer, confused, asked what the stranger meant and was told to stand with one foot on the stranger's. This he did and could see another house, just below his own, and that all the farm's slops went down the chimney of the invisible house. The stranger asked if the farmer would move his door to the other side of the house, which the farmer subsequently did, walling up the original door; from that day, the farmer's livestock flourished and he became one of the most prosperous men in the area.

== Religion ==
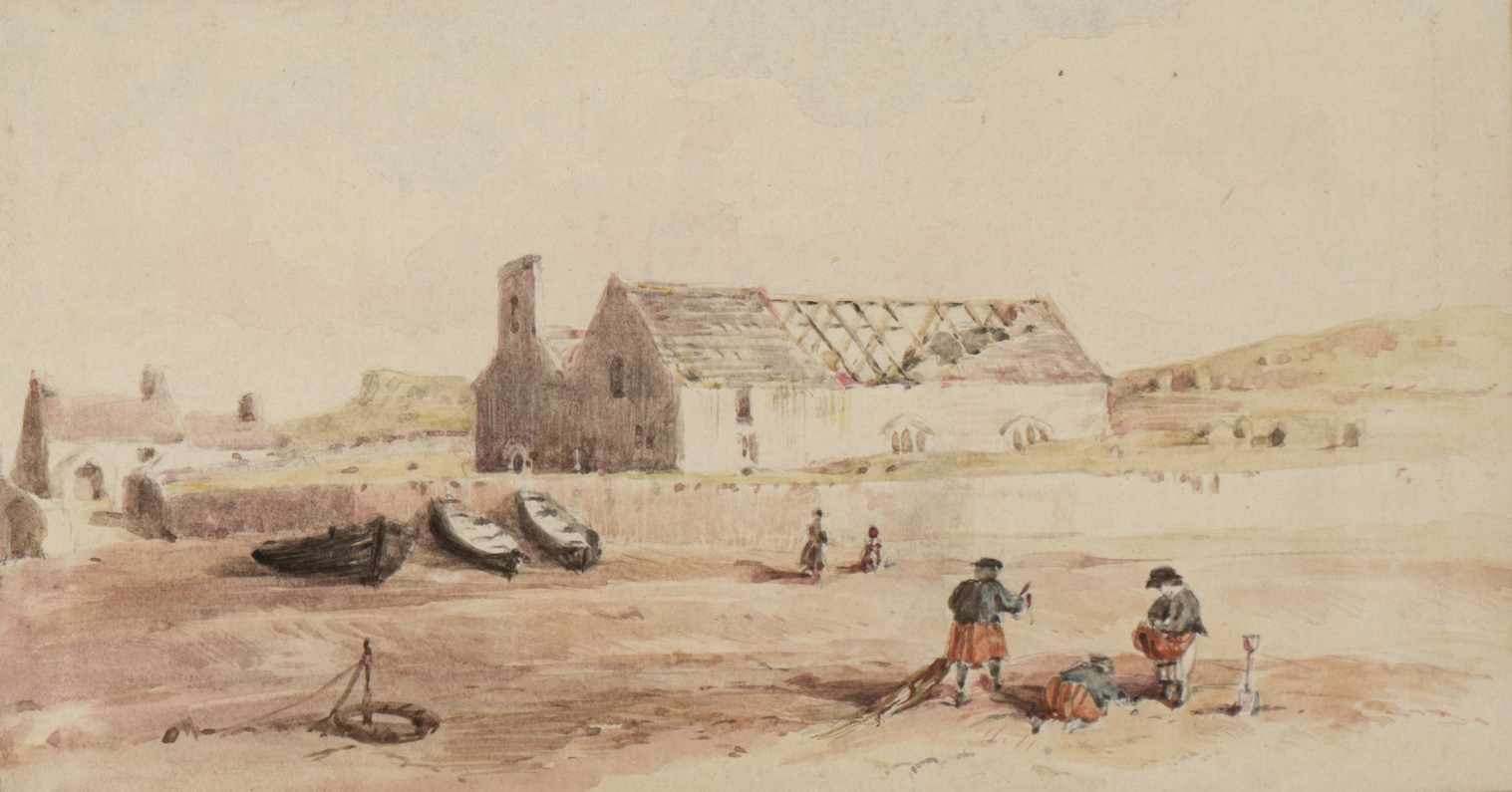
The abandoned parish church on 27 September 1862

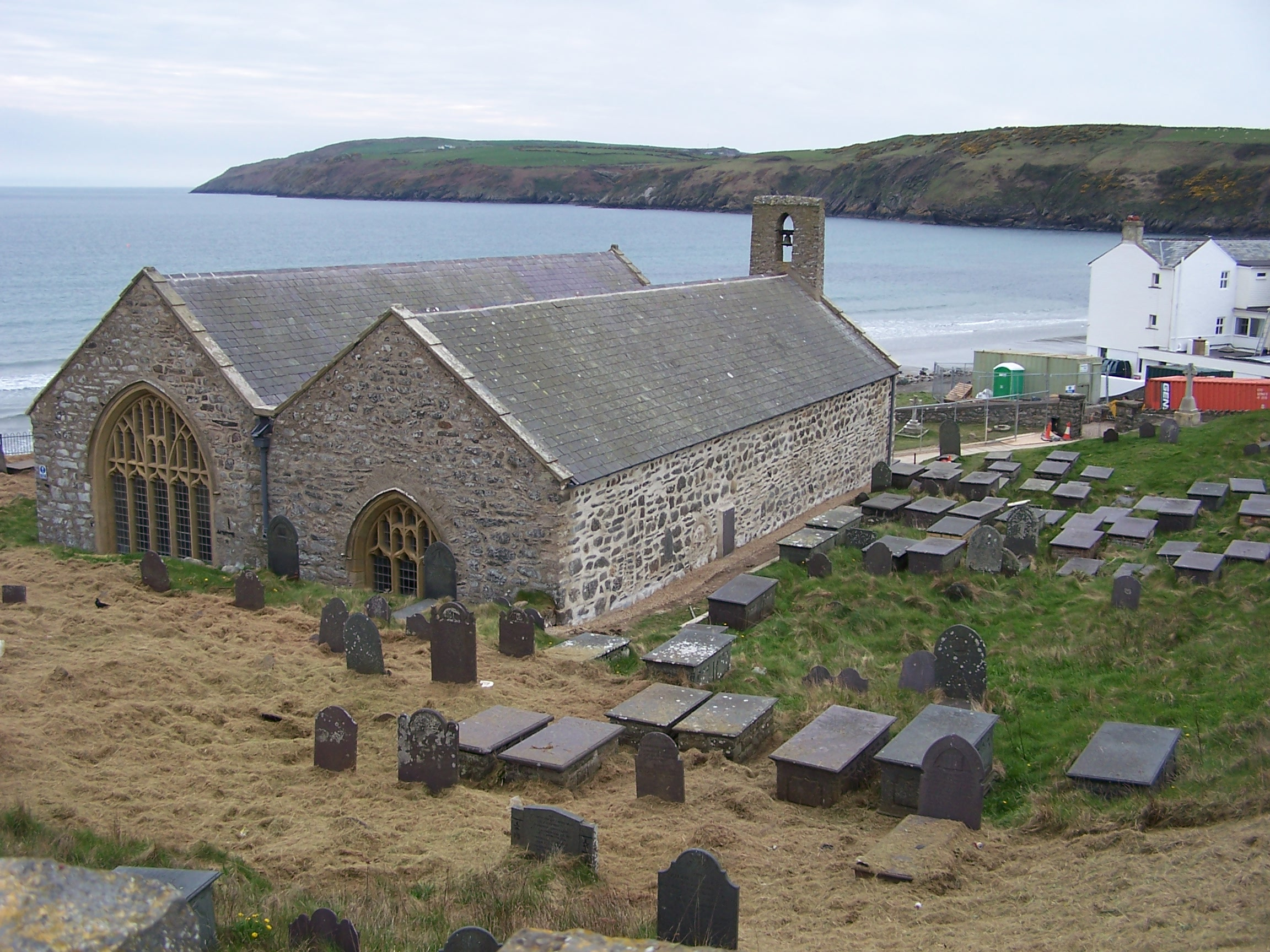
St Hywyn's Church, known as the "Cathedral of Llŷn"

A church was founded in Aberdaron in the 6th century by Saint Hywyn, a follower of Saint Cadfan; it was a significant institution, a monastery and centre of religious learning, rather than simply a place of worship for the locals. The present double-naved Church of St Hywyn (Welsh: Eglwys Hywyn Sant), built in 1137 and known as the "Cathedral of Llŷn", stands above the shore and was on the pilgrim route to Bardsey Island. It contains a 12th-century Romanesque arched door, and a square bell turret. The church was extended in 1417 and abandoned in 1841, when the locals decided to build a new church, Eglwys Newydd, in the village; the new building, however, proved unpopular and the congregation returned in 1906. Inside is a display about the life and works of the poet R. S. Thomas; and in the churchyard stand Y Meini Feracius a Senagus (English: The Veracius and Senacus Stones), the tombstones of two 5th-century Christian priests, found in the 18th century on farmland near Mynydd Anelog.

In 2008, the church became the centre of controversy when the new vicar Jim Cotter, himself gay, blessed a gay civil partnership. The vicar was reprimanded by Barry Morgan, the Archbishop of Wales. Referring to the archbishop's protests, the vicar stated "There was a bit of a to-do about it".

The church at Llanfaelrhys is the only one in the United Kingdom dedicated to Saint Maelrhys, the cousin of both Saint Cadfan and Saint Hywyn, who accompanied them to Wales from Brittany. Legend attributes the building of the church to a trader who landed a cargo of flour near Aberdaron during a famine; he used the profit from his sale to construct a small church for the locals. Much of the building is medieval; the font dates back to the 15th century and there are plain hard wooden benches on the north side; on the south side are 19th-century wooden box pews. The graveyard contains the graves of the three Keating sisters, who restored Plas yn Rhiw.

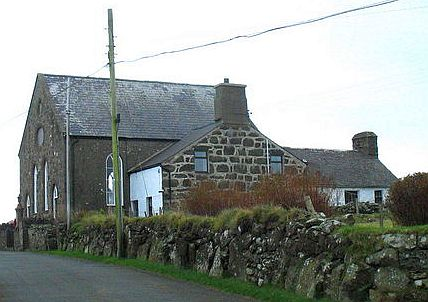
Capel Nebo at Y Rhiw was built in 1813 for the Congregationalists.

St Aelrhiw's Church at Y Rhiw was built in 1860 on the footings of an earlier church. It consists of a small nave and short chancel; aisles to the north and south; and has boulder-built walls and a slate roof. The churchyard contains the graves of some of the bodies that were washed up at Porth Neigwl during the First World War, including a Mercantile Marine seaman who has a Commonwealth war grave here. Above Porth Iago is the site of the ancient St Medin's Church; now just a mound in the middle of a field; it was the parish church of Bodferin.

One of the first non-conformists in the area was Morgan Griffith of Y Rhiw. In 1745, he was brought before the court in Pwllheli, where he was jailed for failing to renounce his beliefs. After his release he returned to Y Rhiw and began to preach again. Re-arrested, he was returned to a prison ship in England, where he subsequently died. Two of the earliest non-conformist chapels in the Llŷn Peninsula were established at Penycaerau, in 1768, and Uwchmynydd, in 1770; the Congregationalists opened Cephas Independent Chapel in 1829; and Capel Nebo was built at Y Rhiw in 1813; the Wesleyan Methodists followed in 1832 at Capel Pisgah. By 1850, there were eight non-conformist chapels in Aberdaron, five in Y Rhiw and one on Bardsey Island; but more were to be built. The Calvinistic Methodists opened Capel Tan y Foel; and Capel Bethesda, the Baptist chapel at Rhoshirwaun, was built in 1904. Aberdaron is also home to a Seventh-day Adventist youth camp named Glan-yr-afon, located 1 mile (1.6 km) from the village centre.

At the 2001 census, 73.9% of the population claimed to be Christian and 15.0% stated that they had no religion.

== Sport ==
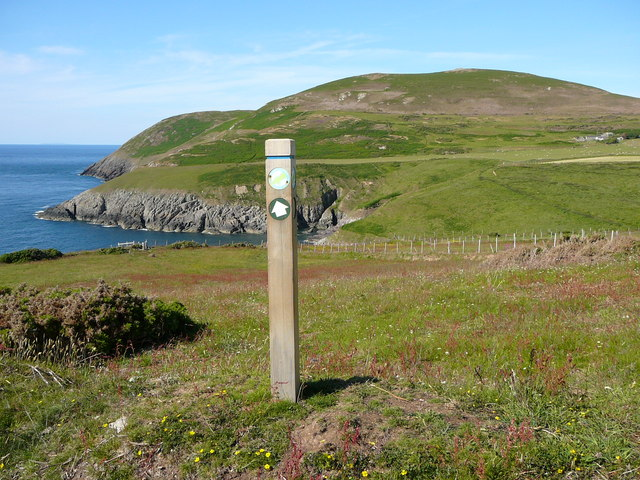
Llŷn Coastal Path (Welsh: Llwybr Arfordir Llŷn) stretches for 84 mi (135 km) around the Gwynedd coast

Aberdaron hosts numerous sailing regattas featuring clinker-built boats unique to the area; there is a popular regatta every August where the races are open to everyone. Sea angling trips are operated from Porth Meudwy, fishing for pollock, coley and mackerel; wrasse, bass, mullet and gurnard are also possible. Bass and coley can be caught from the rocks at Porth Iago; and wrasse, pollock and mackerel are plentiful. Access is difficult at Uwchmynydd, but pollock, mackerel, wrasse and conger are caught; huss are plentiful; and ling are found occasionally.

The village is a popular walking centre and lies on the Llŷn Coastal Path, which runs 84 miles (135 km) from Caernarfon to Porthmadog as part of the Wales Coast Path. Kayaking is possible from both Aberdaron and Porth Neigwl, and the south-facing sunshine coast is a major attraction; there are camping facilities for canoeists on the shores of Porth Neigwl.

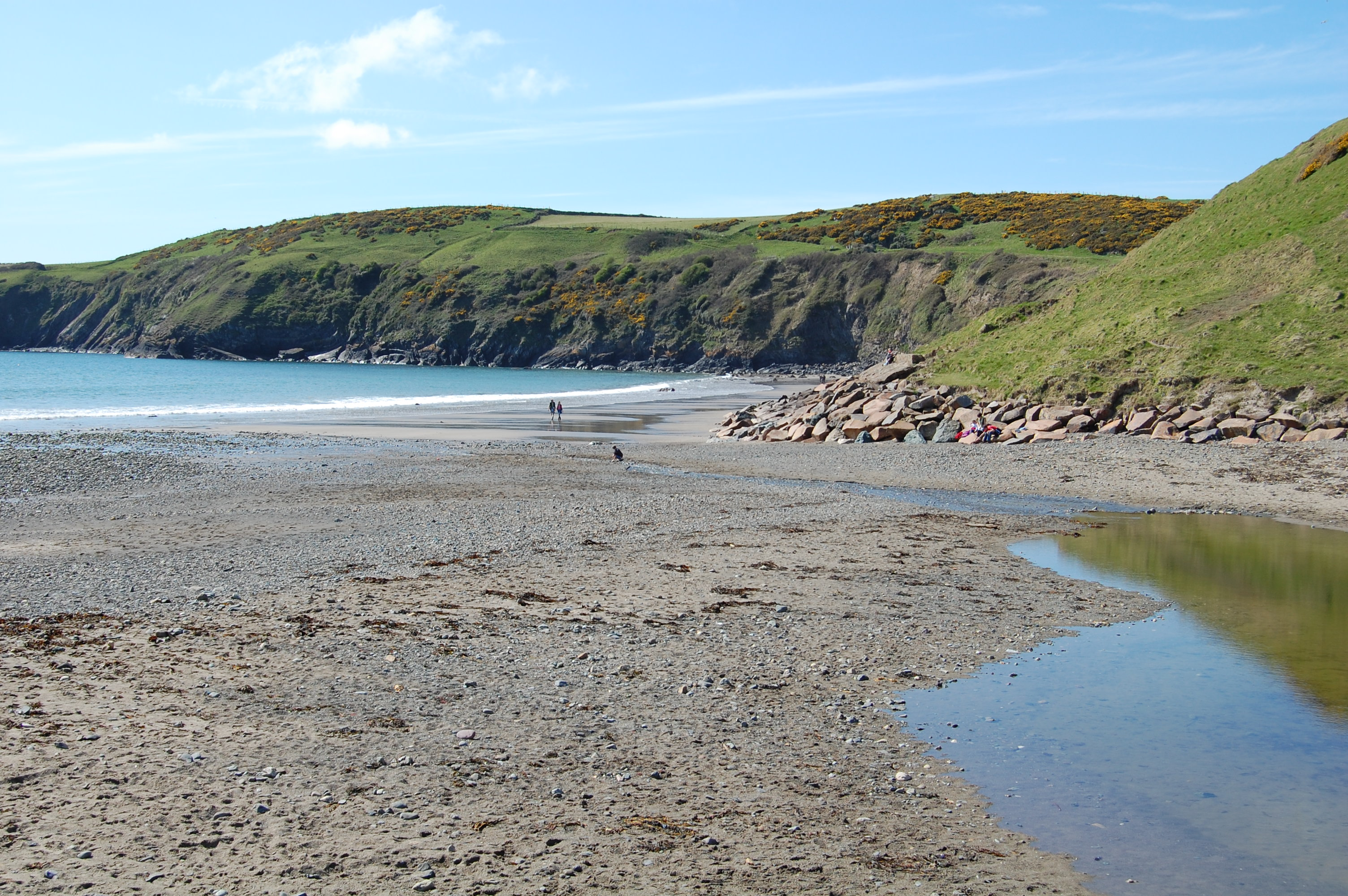
The beach at Aberdaron attracts both bathers and surfers; it received a Seaside Award in 2008

The area has excellent diving. Underwater visibility at Bardsey Island extends to 66 feet (20 m) and there is a rich variety of sea life; it is considered some of the best diving in Gwynedd. The Ynysoedd Gwylanod are particularly popular and the wreck of the Glenocum, in Bae Aberdaron, is excellent for novices, having a maximum depth of 26 feet (7.9 m); an extremely large conger eel lives in the lower section of the boiler openings. There is spectacular diving at Pen y Cil, where there is a slate wreck and an unusual cave dive; nearby Carreg Ddu is an isolated rocky island in Bardsey Sound, although care must be taken as there are strong currents.

Beachgoing is popular along the coast. Aberdaron Beach, facing south-west, is sandy, gently shelving and safe; it received a Seaside Award in 2008. Porthor also attracts bathers and has sands which squeak when walked on; the beach at Porth Neigwl was awarded a Green Coast Award in 2009.

Aberdaron Beach is a surfing and bodyboarding location for surfers of all levels, although it can be dangerous at high tide when the waves break directly onto boulders underneath the cliff. The better surfers head for the northern end.
