= Dic Aberdaron =

Welsh traveller and polyglot (1780–1843)

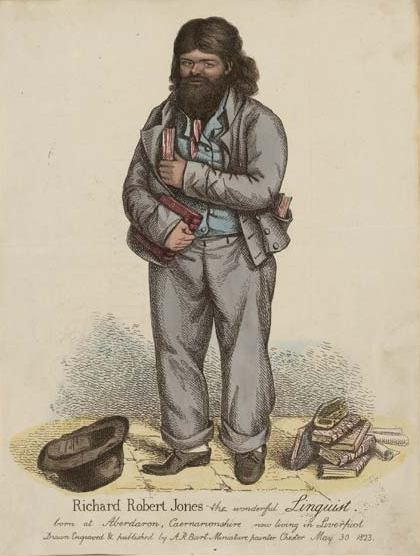
Richard Robert Jones (Dic Aberdaron), 1823

Dic Aberdaron (Richard Robert Jones; 1780–1843), also known as Dick of Aberdaron, was a Welsh traveller and polyglot.

== Life ==
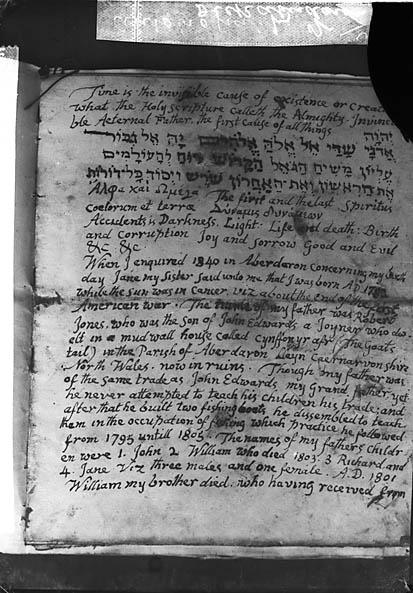
First manuscript page of Dic's autobiography

Aberdaron was born in 1780 in the coastal town of Aberdaron with the herbalist Alice Griffith as midwife. He had little or no formal education, but was reputed to have taught himself 14 or 15 languages, both ancient and modern, including Latin at the age of 11.

Aberdaron's Welsh, Greek and Hebrew dictionary is now kept at St Asaph Cathedral.

He is buried in the parish church of St Asaph, north Wales. William Roscoe, the writer, wrote a Memoir of him and the Welsh poet R. S. Thomas, who was once the vicar of Aberdaron, wrote a poem about him, simply titled Dic Aberdaron. T. H. Parry-Williams wrote a somewhat different poem with the same title in Welsh, stressing his eccentricity and the pointlessness of his learning, since he never appears to have used any of his languages, but concludes: "Chwarae-teg i Dic – nid yw pawb yn gwirioni'r un fath" (Fair play to Dic – not everybody is silly in the same way).
