= Flower paintings of Georgia O'Keeffe =

Paintings made between 1920s and 1950s

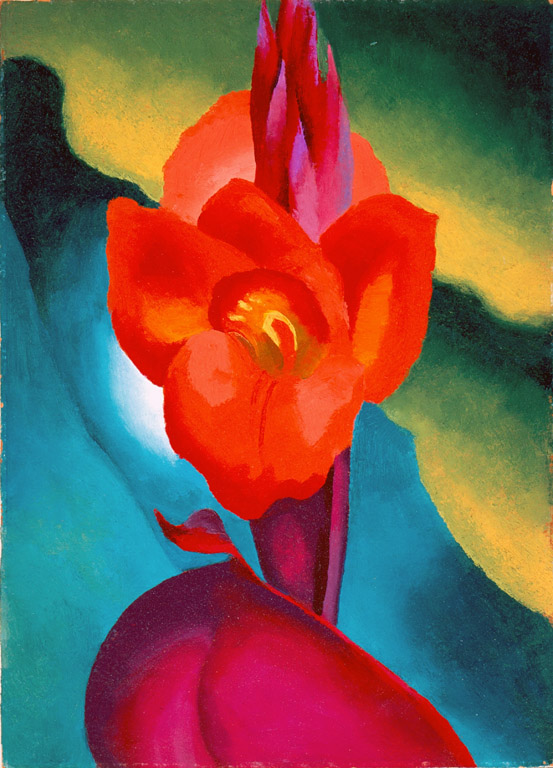
Georgia O'Keeffe, Red Canna, 1919, High Museum of Art, Atlanta, Georgia

The American artist Georgia O'Keeffe is best known for her close-up, or large-scale flower paintings, which she painted from the mid-1920s through the 1950s. She made about 200 paintings of flowers of the more than 2,000 paintings that she made over her career. One of her paintings, Jimson Weed, sold for $44.4 million, making it the most expensive painting sold of a female artist's work as of 2014.

== Background ==
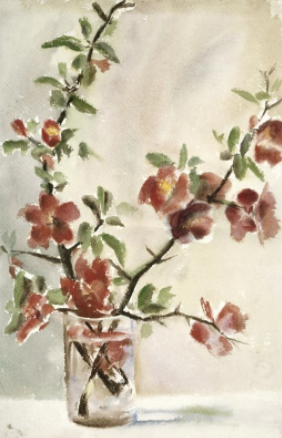
Georgia O'Keeffe, Untitled, vase of flowers, watercolor on paper, 17 3/4 in × 11 1/2 in (45.1 cm × 29.2 cm), between 1903 and 1905

O'Keeffe experimented with depicting flowers in her high school art class. Her teacher explained how important it was to examine the flower before drawing it. So, O'Keeffe held it in different ways, capturing different perspectives of the flowers, and also created studies of only a portion of the flower. During this process she also drew the flower simpler with each iteration.

After she had been painting for a few years, she became discouraged, and when she began painting again, she remembered the technique she had learned earlier to see things in a different way.

== Influenced by photography ==
By the mid-1920s, O'Keeffe began making large-scale paintings of natural forms at close range, as if seen through a magnifying lens. O'Keeffe learned modernist photography techniques, like close-cropping, from Paul Strand and others. Strand was particularly influential in her development of cropped, close-up images. She received unprecedented acceptance as a female artist from the fine art world due to her powerful graphic images. Depictions of small flowers that fill the canvas suggest the immensity of nature and encourage viewers to looks at flowers differently.

A flower is relatively small. Everyone has many associations with a flower - the idea of flowers. You put out your hand to touch the flower — lean forward to smell it — maybe touch it with your lips almost without thinking — or give it to someone to please them. Still — in a way — nobody sees a flower — really — it is so small — we haven't time — and to see takes time, like to have a friend takes time... So I said to myself — I'll paint what I see — what the flower is to me but I'll paint it big and they will be surprised into taking time to look at it — I will make even busy New-Yorkers take time to see what I see of flowers... Well — I made you take time to look at what I saw and when you took time to really notice my flower, you hung all your own associations with flowers on my flower and you write about my flower as if I think and see what you think and see of the flower — and I don't.

Examples of some of her close-up images of flowers include Oriental Poppies, several Red Canna paintings, and what has been described as her first large-scale flower painting, Petunia No. 2 (1924).

== Composition and design ==
In 1928, Time magazine wrote of her paintings, "when Georgia O'Keeffe paints flowers, she does not paint fifty flowers stuffed into a dish. On most of her canvases there appeared one gigantic bloom, its huge feathery petals furled into some astonishing pattern of color and shade and line."

== Symbolism ==
Works such as Black Iris III (1926) evoke a veiled representation of female genitalia while also accurately depicting the center of an iris. Alfred Stieglitz, O'Keeffe's husband who promoted her works of art, first espoused the theory that the paintings represented a woman's vulva in the 1920s. Tanya Barson, curator at Tate Modern, stated that male art critics perpetuated this assertion. O'Keeffe consistently and vigorously denied the validity of Freudian interpretations of her art.

Feminist artists viewed this work as a centralised attention on the female sexual anatomy. However, despite being a feminist artist, O’Keeffe rejected this view as it limited the key significance and meaning of her work.

I thought you could write something about me that men can't – What I want written – I do not know – I have no definite idea of what it should be. – but a woman who has lived many things and who sees lines and colors as an expression of living – might say something that a man can't – I feel there is something unexplored about woman that only a woman can explore – Men have done all they can do about it. Does that mean anything to you – or doesn't it?

— Georgia O'Keeffe, In a letter to Mabel Dodge Luhan, in 1925

O'Keeffe, whose comfort with her sexuality is evident in the nude photographs taken of her by her husband Alfred Stieglitz, was not comfortable with the way that the paintings were interpreted as erotic images. This may have more to do with the degrading ways that the paintings were discussed. Stieglitz marketed her flower paintings in sexual terms, including quotes from men who were influenced by Stieglitz's viewpoints. She asked her friend, Mabel Dodge Luhan, to write of her work from a feminine perspective to counter interpretations by men.

Judy Chicago gave O'Keeffe a prominent place in her The Dinner Party (1979) in recognition of what many prominent feminist artists considered groundbreaking introduction of sensual and feminist imagery in her works of art, seeing it as a sign of female empowerment.

Beginning July 2016, Tate Modern conducted a retrospective of more than 100 of O'Keeffe's work, in part to provide additional views to the theory that her paintings are depictions of female genitalia.
