= Janet Morley =

British author

- Occupations: Feminist author and poet
- Known for: All desires known

Janet Morley is a British author, poet, and Christian feminist.

Her books Celebrating Women (1986, co-edited with Hannah Ward) and All Desires Known (1988) established Morley as a campaigner for inclusive 'non-sexist' language in Christian liturgy. Her prayer For the darkness of waiting, written in 1985, "grew out of long years of campaigning for women's vocations to be recognised" by the Church of England: it has been used at national events celebrating women's ministry including the Liturgy of Hope at Canterbury Cathedral on 18 April 1986, and the service Celebrating 25 Years of Women Priests at Lambeth Palace on 1 March 2019 (read by Sally Hitchiner). Her prayer O God who brought us to birth, and in whose arms we die, first published in 1985, appears in Common Worship, part of the official liturgical resource of the Church of England. Critics acclaim her anthologies of poetry: The Heart's Time (2011), Haphazard by Starlight (2013), Our Last Awakening (2016), and Love Set You Going (2019).

== Biography ==
Morley studied English at New Hall, Cambridge (now Murray Edwards College), pursued biblical studies at King's College London, and received a Postgraduate Certificate in Education at the University of Newcastle upon Tyne.

She has worked in adult religious education for Christian Aid and for the Methodist Church of Great Britain, in the Methodist Connexional Team and at Wesley House, as formational tutor and as the founding Commissioning Editor of Holiness, its open access peer-reviewed journal. She edited the volumes of Holiness for 2015 and 2016.

Caring responsibilities for others have included raising children, caring for her six grandchildren, and looking after elderly relatives as they live with dementia.

Like her mother and her father, she has been a church-going member of the Church of England her whole life.

=== Member of St Hilda Community ===
Morley was a member of the St Hilda Community, contributing liturgy eventually published in All Desires Known.

The St Hilda Community was a group of women and men who met for worship each Sunday, from February 1987 until at least 1991, first at St Benet's, the chapel of Queen Mary College (now QMUL), and later at Bow Road Methodist Church. Although there was an ongoing campaign, since at least 1975, by the Movement for the Ordination of Women to allow the ordination of women to the priesthood, the General Synod of the Church of England would not vote in favour of women priests until November 1992. A purpose of the St Hilda Community was to offer a 'non-sexist liturgy' that "gave full space and authority to women, without apology, secrecy, or shame". Another purpose was that its members could "receive the broader vision of our Christian heritage and women's spiritual offerings in language which excludes no person and no image of God". The community decided to hold eucharists celebrated by women priests lawfully ordained in other countries, despite this practice being declared "illegal" by Graham Leonard, then Bishop of London. Resident in London for doctoral studies, American priest Suzanne Fageol accepted the invitation to be priest to the community. Fageol used texts by Morley, such as the Eucharistic prayer for Easter, celebrated on Easter Day 1987. Fageol writes:

Such feelings as vulnerability, weakness and helplessness have traditionally been interpreted by our culture as belonging to the psychological character of women, and labelled negative. Feminism tends to view them as constructive and positive essential human feelings. ... Janet Morley, a feminist liturgical author and a member of St Hilda's, writes for us in this way when she uses phrases such as: 'vulnerable God', 'so we may show forth his brokenness', 'for on this night you were delivered as one of us...needy and naked', 'you emptied yourself of power', and 'inspire our weakness'. [citation in original]

Watson discusses both the St Hilda Community and Morley's book Celebrating Women with Hannah Ward.

== Bibliography ==
=== All Desires Known ===
The first edition, a green paperback jointly published by the Movement for the Ordination of Women and Women in Theology in 1988, divides into three parts: Collects, Formal Prayers, and Psalms and Poems.

Introducing the book, Morley writes:

'All desires known': this phrase has always evoked in me that distinctive stance which I associate with authentic worship: namely, an appalled sense of self-exposure combined with a curious but profound relief; and so to write under this title has been both a discipline and a comfort. I have chosen it because I understand the Christian life to be about the integration of desire: our personal desires, our political vision, and our longing for God.

She also writes, concerning her use of feminine language for God:

Feminine imagery not only affirms a comfortable closeness for women to the God in whose image we are made: it also prevents us from distancing ourselves---as we can do with 'male' language---from the uncomfortable, even frightening closeness of the difficult God who is not made in our image.

There is a collect for each Sunday and major weekday festival of the church's lectionary year, written weekly from Advent 1986 to Advent 1987, guided by the eucharistic lectionary of the 1980 Alternative Service Book.

Items were written for regular use by the Women in Theology liturgy group and the St Hilda Community, and for special occasions including: the Liturgy of Hope, Canterbury Cathedral, 18 April 1986; a communion service for women only at Holy Trinity House, Paddington, on Christmas Eve 1986; the opening of holy orders to women in the Diocese of London on 31 March 1987 at St Mary-le-Bow; and the Greenham vigil, on Maundy Thursday 1987, by Christian women at Blue Gate, Greenham Common Women's Peace Camp.

The second edition is substantially expanded, with forty-two additional pieces of writing. The cover features a painting Red Canna (circa 1923) by Georgia O'Keeffe, from the collection of the University of Arizona Museum of Art, a gift of Oliver James.

Edition	Publisher	Year	ISBN
	Movement for the Ordination of Women	1988	ISBN 0951303902
	Women in Theology	1988	ISBN 0951303805
Second revised edition	SPCK	1992	ISBN 978-0281045914
New edition	SPCK	2005	ISBN 978-0281056880
Third edition	Morehouse Publishing	2006	ISBN 978-0819222251

=== Collections of Prayers ===
As well as All Desires Known, Morley is author or editor of several collections of prayers and worship material.

Title	Publisher	Year	ISBN	Notes
Celebrating Women	WIT/MOW	1986		(edited by Janet Morley and Hannah Ward)
Bread of Tomorrow: Praying with the World's Poor	SPCK	1992	ISBN 978-0281045594	(edited by Janet Morley)
Companions of God: Praying for Peace in the Holy Land	Christian Aid	1994	ISBN 978-0904379198	(authored by Janet Morley)
Celebrating Women	SPCK	1995	ISBN 978-0281048366	(edited by Hannah Ward, Jennifer Wild, and Janet Morley; second revised edition)
Bread of Tomorrow: Prayers for the Church Year	Orbis Books	1996	ISBN 978-0883448311	(edited by Janet Morley)
Dear Life: Praying Through the Year with Christian Aid	Christian Aid	1998	ISBN 9780904379310	(edited by Janet Morley, Jennifer Wild, and Hannah Ward)
Bread of Tomorrow: Praying with the World's Poor	SPCK	2004	ISBN 978-0281056989	(edited by Janet Morley, new edition)

=== Anthologies of Poetry ===
Starting in 2011, Morley has published a series of poetry anthologies on different themes.

Title	Publisher	Year	ISBN
The Heart's Time: A Poem a Day for Lent and Easter	SPCK	2011	ISBN 978-0281063727
Haphazard by Starlight: A Poem a Day from Advent to Epiphany	SPCK	2013	ISBN 978-0281070626
Our Last Awakening: Poems For Living In The Face Of Death	SPCK	2016	ISBN 978-0281073542
Love Set You Going: Poems of the Heart	SPCK	2019	ISBN 978-0281078929

== Talks ==
- Haphazard by Starlight: an Advent Pilgrimage, talk in the Sunday Forum, St Paul's Cathedral, 3 December 2013.
- Guarding the ‘holy fire’: dementia and the mystery of love, annual Joseph Winter lecture, delivered to the churches in Wakefield, July 2017.
- Whatsoever things are true...whatsoever things are lovely...think on these things, sermon preached before the University of Cambridge, 15 October 2017.
- Love Set You Going, talk at the Church Times Festival of Faith and Literature, Bloxham School, 21 February 2020.

== Reception ==
Elaine Graham writes that Morley's Collects are "some of the most well-known, and widely-used, feminist prayers".

Muriel Orevillo-Montenegro writes that Morley's Eucharistic Prayer for Christmas Eve "expresses beautifully the connection between Jesus' blood and women's menstruation".

Mary Grey writes, regarding and you held me: "Clearly an erotic experience is being described, yes, of darkness, but also of longing, surrender, akin to aching for God. It highlights...the mystics' use of eros, desire, longing, with definite sexual connotations, which evokes an embodied form of mysticism."

Wilma Jakobsen writes that Morley's O God, the Power of the Powerless "particularly spoke to us as South African women in the complexities of our struggles, and we used it frequently. Morley's images of persistence and power in the midst of powerlessness, and of God as the source of strength for those who are powerless, encouraged us to keep on proclaiming the truth."

Malcolm Doney writes, in his review of Love Set You Going, that Morley is "noted for her excellent magpie collections of poetry, prayers, and rites".

Jenny Daggers describes Morley's "major contribution in writing liturgical material and writing about liturgical language".

Lesley McLean's dissertation analyses the language of the Book of Common Prayer, and its modern revisioning in the works of Morley and also Jim Cotter.
