= Anne Griffith =

Welsh practitioner of folk medicine

- Born: 1734; Aberdaron, Wales, Great Britain
- Died: 1821 (aged 86–87); Aberdaron, Wales, British Empire

Anne Griffith (1734–1821) was a Welsh practitioner of folk medicine who was an early user of foxgloves to treat heart conditions.

== Life ==
Griffith was born in Aberdaron in 1734. She spent all of her adult life at a small cottage, Bryn Canaid, in the area of the parish called Uwchmynydd. She was known for herbal recipes. Notable amongst of which was her use of foxgloves for heart conditions. This was before it had been formally "discovered" by the British scientist William Withering.

She also acted as a midwife and among the children was Richard Robert Jones otherwise known as the linguist Dic Aberdaron.

Griffith died at her home in 1821. She was buried in St Hywyn's Church, Aberdaron. Information is known about her work due to studies of William Jones (Gwilym Daron) who lives in Aberdaron.
