= St Hywyn's Church, Aberdaron =

Coordinates: 52.8038°N 4.7114°W

Church of St Hywyn
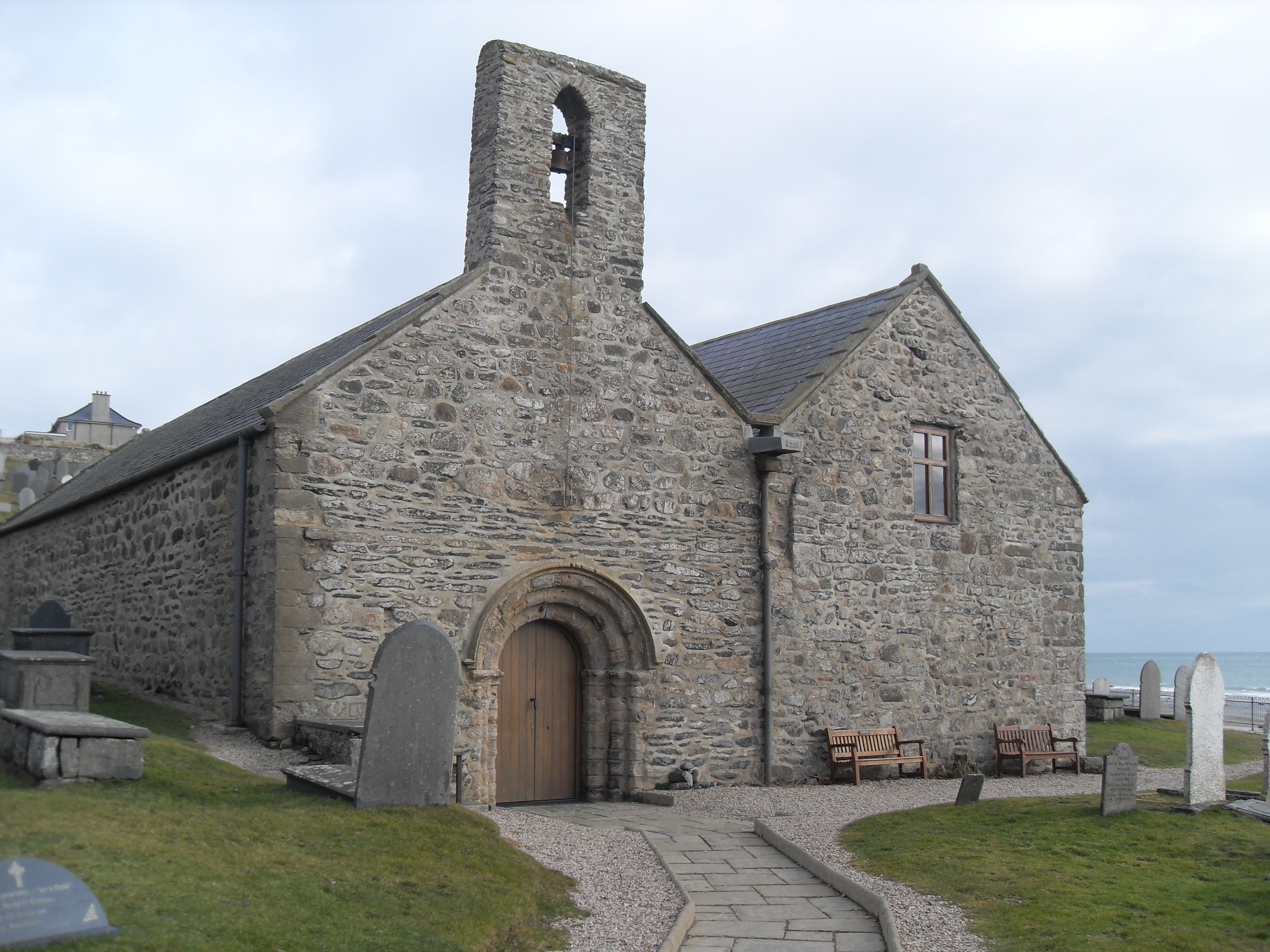
- "The Cathedral of Llŷn"

- Location in Gwynedd
- OS grid reference: SH173263
- Location: Aberdaron, Gwynedd
- Country: Wales
- Denomination: Church in Wales
- Website: The Church of St Hywyn website

History
- Status: Parish church
- Founded: 5th–7th century

Architecture
- Functional status: Active
- Heritage designation: Grade I
- Designated: 19 October 1971
- Architectural type: Church

Administration
- Diocese: Bangor
- Parish: Bro Enlli Ministry Area

Clergy
- Vicar: Ven. Andrew Jones

The Church of St Hywyn, Aberdaron, Gwynedd, Wales, is a parish church dating from the 12th century. Its origins are earlier, as a clas church from the 5th to the 7th centuries. Further building, including the construction of the second nave, took place in the late 15th or early 16th centuries. Its importance was as an embarkation point for the abbey on Bardsey Island which became a significant site of pilgrimage in the Middle Ages. The Reformation saw the church's decline, and by the 19th century it was a ruin. In the 1850s a new church, Eglwys Newydd, was constructed inland, but proved so unpopular that St Hywyn's was restored. The Welsh poet R. S. Thomas was minister at the church, which is a Grade I listed building.

== History ==
The origins of the church are as a clas settlement from the Dark Ages of the 5th to the 7th centuries. The clas was founded by St Hywyn, an early Welsh Saint originally from Brittany. The settlement rose in importance after 1190 when Bardsey Island, the "Island of 20,000 Saints", and St Davids in Pembrokeshire were declared places of pilgrimage by the Papacy. The writer Simon Jenkins notes that visits to both sites equated to a single pilgrimage to Rome. St Hywyn's expanded greatly to accommodate the very large numbers of pilgrims sailing to Bardsey Abbey, who were fed and watered in the Great Kitchen (Y Gegin Fawr) next to the church. The present building is first recorded in 1115 and further building took place in the 14th and 15th centuries.

Following the Reformation, the church declined, experiencing a long history of non-resident clergy. By the 1840s, it had become ruinous and a new church was built further inland. The new church proved to be unpopular, however, and by 1868 the original church had been restored and brought back into use. Further restorations took place in the 19th and 20th centuries. The church, known as "The Cathedral of Llyn", remains an active church in the Bro Enlli Ministry Area.

The poet R. S. Thomas was minister at the church from 1967 to 1978. Inside is a display about his life and works.

In 2008, the church became the centre of controversy when the new vicar Jim Cotter, himself gay, blessed a gay civil partnership. The vicar was reprimanded by Barry Morgan, the Archbishop of Wales. Referring to the archbishop's protests, the vicar stated "There was a bit of a to-do about it".

== Architecture and description ==
The church comprises two naves, of equal length but of differing dates; the Northern is largely 12th century while the Southern dates from the 14th century. The building is constructed of rubble with slate roofs and a bellcote. The interior, which was refurbished in 2006 has a hammerbeam roof. The internal arcade is of the 15th century and is described as "distinguished" in the Gwynedd volume of The Buildings of Wales. Two carved boulders within the church commemorate a pair of 5th or 6th century priests, Veracius and Senacus. Known as Y Meini Feracius a Senagus (English: The Veracius and Senacus Stones), the tombstones were found in the 18th century on farmland near Mynydd Anelog.

The church is a Grade I listed building, its listing recording the church as "one of the major churches of the Lleyn".

== Notable burials ==
The local herbalist Alice Griffith was buried here in 1821.
