= Jim Cotter (priest) =

Anglican priest and poet

James England Cotter (23 August 1942 - 16 April 2014) was an English Anglican priest known for his religious poetry and his advocacy for gay and lesbian Christians.

== Life and ministry ==
Cotter was born in Stockport in 1942 and was educated at Stockport Grammar School before studying at Gonville and Caius College, Cambridge, where he was Chaplain between 1974 and 1977, later being ordained priest in the Diocese of Manchester.

In 1976 he was a founding member and the first general secretary of the Lesbian and Gay Christian Movement, or LGCM, later renamed OneBodyOneFaith. In this capacity, he appeared on the TV programme The Lord's My Shepherd and He Knows I'm Gay, speaking openly about his own sexuality and how it related to his spirituality and mental health. Reflecting later, he said: "I think human beings, including myself, hurt and were hurt more than they would like to admit, but at the same time stumbling towards something, we weren’t quite sure what we were stumbling towards. I don’t think anybody would have even dreamt of thinking of a phrase like Gay Marriage at that time."

Later, during his ministry in the Church in Wales, he received a reprimand from then-Archbishop of Wales the Rt Revd Barry Morgan for conducting a same-sex blessing. He took the opportunity to publish The Service of My Love, a pastoral and liturgical handbook for such occasions.

Formerly at Llandecwyn, Cotter's final post was as vicar of St Hywyn's Church, Aberdaron, where his predecessor had been the Welsh poet R. S. Thomas, whom Cotter cited as an inspiration for his own work.

He was being cared for by friends when he died from leukaemia on 16 April 2014 at his home in Llandudno.

== Legacy ==
In his lifetime he published about 30 books and pamphlets, many through his own publishing company, Cairns, and many of his personal notes and diaries are now housed in the Jim Cotter Collection at Gladstone's Library in Hawarden, Wales. Several of his prayers and poems are included as alternative canticles in the prayer book of the Society of St Francis in Europe.

The Jim Cotter Trust has funded CRC Online, a virtual resource for the St Mark's Centre for Radical Christianity, among other projects.

The collection Untamed Gospel: Protests, poems and prose for the Christian year by Martyn Percy, published in 2017, includes short paraphrased readings for each day of the week by Cotter. Reviewing the book, Christopher Irvine wrote: "Cotter had a gentle, arresting style, and a sure poetic turn of phrase which makes even the most familiar scripture come alive in unexpected ways. In one sense, the whole collection here is a tribute to Cotter’s memory."

Lesley McLean's dissertation analyses the language of the Book of Common Prayer, and its modern revisioning in the works of Cotter and also Janet Morley.
