= Maelrhys =

Maelrhys is honoured as a saint on Bardsey Island in Wales. Maelrhys was likely of Breton origin but little else is known of him beyond popular cult and local records.

Saint Maelrhys is commemorated on 1 January by the Church in Wales, Western Rite Orthodox communities, and the Roman Catholic Church.

== See also ==
- Brittany
- Breton language
- Welsh language
