= R. S. Thomas =

Welsh poet and Anglican priest (1913–2000)

The Reverend R. S. Thomas
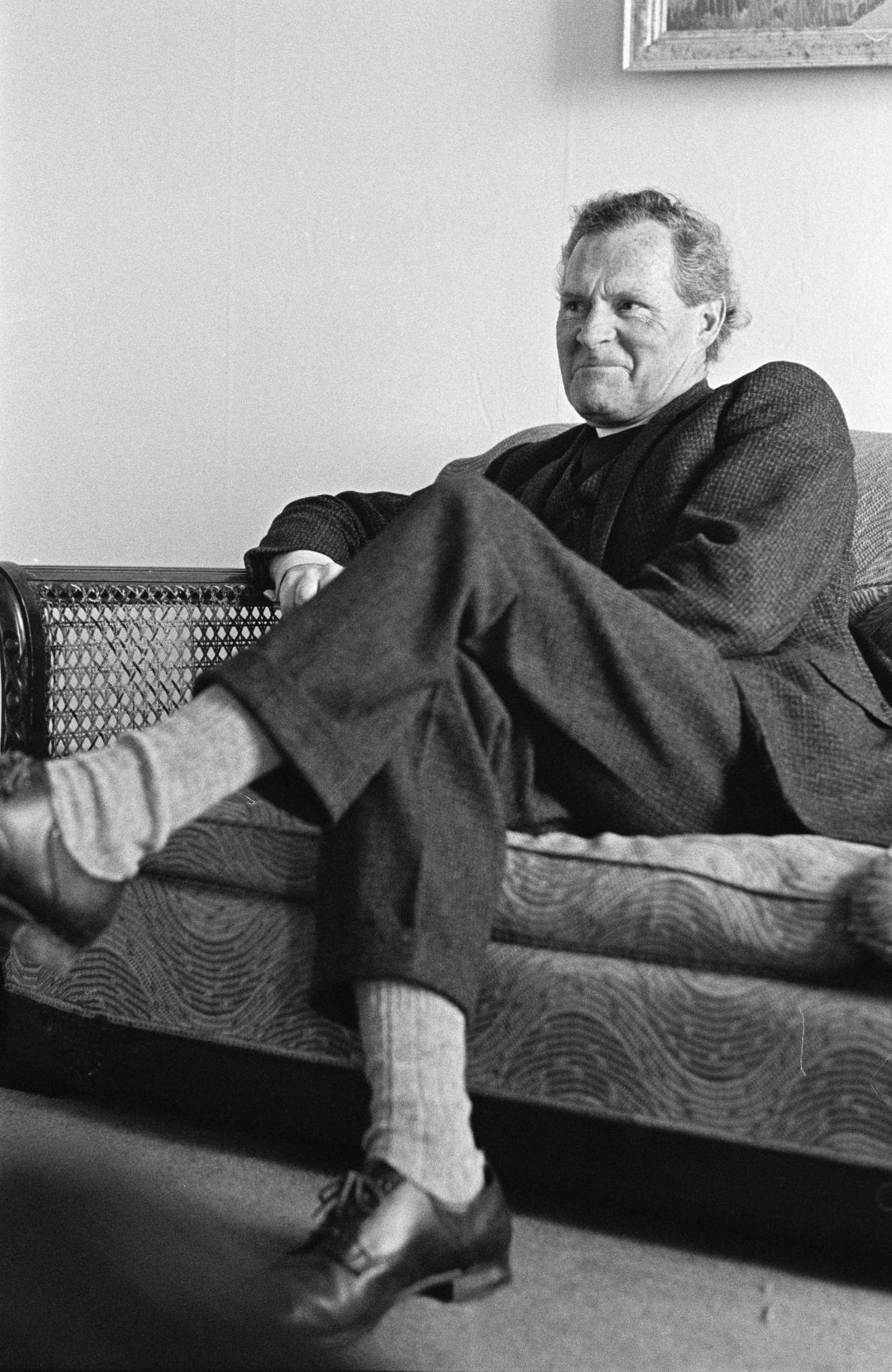
- Thomas being interviewed for Y Cymro in 1967
- Church: Church in Wales
- Diocese: Diocese of Bangor

Orders
- Ordination: 1936 (deacon); 1937 (priest)

Personal details
- Born: Ronald Stuart Thomas; 29 March 1913 Cardiff, Glamorgan, Wales
- Died: 25 September 2000 (aged 87) Pentrefelin, Gwynedd, Wales
- Denomination: Anglicanism
- Spouse: Mildred Eldridge (m. 1940)
- Children: 1
- Occupation: Poet, priest
- Education: University College of North Wales; St. Michael's College, Llandaff

Ronald Stuart Thomas (29 March 1913 – 25 September 2000), published as R. S. Thomas, was a Welsh poet and Anglican priest noted for nationalism, spirituality and dislike of the anglicisation of Wales. John Betjeman, introducing Song at the Year's Turning (1955), the first collection of Thomas's poetry from a major publisher, predicted that Thomas would be remembered long after he himself was forgotten. M. Wynn Thomas said: "He was the Aleksandr Solzhenitsyn of Wales because he was such a troubler of the Welsh conscience. He was one of the major English language and European poets of the 20th century."

== Life ==
R. S. Thomas was born at 5 Newfoundland Road, Gabalfa, Llandaff, Cardiff as the only child of Margaret (née Davies) and Thomas Hubert Thomas. The family moved to Holyhead in 1918 because of his father's work in the Merchant Navy. He was awarded a bursary in 1932 to study at the University College of North Wales, where he read Latin. In 1936, after he completed his theological training at St Michael's College, Llandaff, he was ordained as a priest in the Anglican Church in Wales. From 1936 to 1940 he was the curate of Chirk, Denbighshire, where he met his future wife, Mildred "Elsi" Eldridge, an English artist. He subsequently became curate-in charge of Tallarn Green, Flintshire, as part of his duties as curate of Hanmer, Wrexham between 1940 and 1942.

In Hanmer he was an assistant to the Rev. Thomas Meredith-Morris, grandfather of the writer Lorna Sage, a fact later described by Byron Rogers as a "crossing of paths of two of Wales's strangest clergymen". Whilst Sage devotes a great deal of her autobiography Bad Blood to her late relative, she does not mention Thomas, who was in any case in Hanmer before Sage was born. However, her memoir gives some insight into the strange environment in which Thomas worked as a young priest. Thomas never wrote much about his curacies and nothing is known of the relationship between him and Meredith-Morris.

Thomas and Eldridge were married in 1940 and remained together until her death in 1991. Their son, (Andreas) Gwydion, was born on 29 August 1945 and died on 15 September 2016. The Thomas family lived on a tiny income and lacked the comforts of modern life, largely through their own choice. One of the few household amenities the family ever owned, a vacuum cleaner, was rejected because Thomas decided it was too noisy.

From 1942 to 1954 Thomas was rector of St Michael's Church, Manafon, near Welshpool in rural Montgomeryshire. During his time there he began to study Welsh and published his first three volumes of poetry, The Stones of the Field (1946), An Acre of Land (1952) and The Minister (1953). Thomas's poetry achieved a breakthrough with the publication in 1955 of his fourth book, Song at the Year's Turning, in effect a collected edition of his first three volumes. This was critically well received and opened with an introduction by Betjeman. His position was also helped by winning the Royal Society of Literature's Heinemann Award.

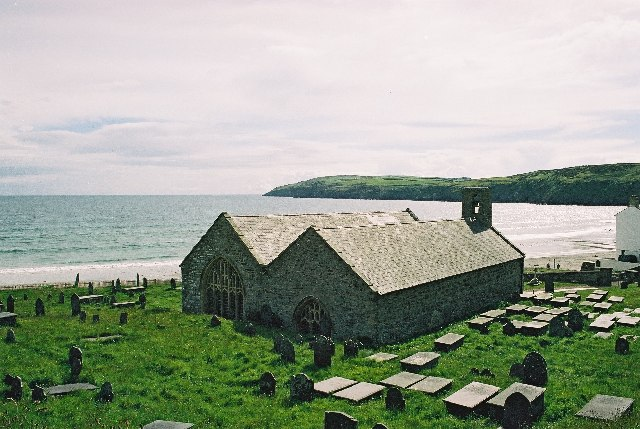
St Hywyn's Church in Aberdaron where Thomas was vicar from 1967 to 1978

"To A Young Poet" by R. S. Thomas (Mashup) by Othniel Smith, read by Falstaff, Rice University

Thomas learnt the Welsh language from the age of 30, – too late in life, he said, to be able to write poetry in it. The 1960s saw him working in a predominantly Welsh-speaking community and he later wrote two prose works in Welsh, Neb (Nobody), an ironic and revealing autobiography written in the third person, and Blwyddyn yn Llŷn (A Year in Llŷn). In 1964 he won the Queen's Gold Medal for Poetry. From 1967 to 1978 he was vicar of St Hywyn's Church (built 1137) in Aberdaron at the western tip of the Llŷn Peninsula.

Thomas retired as a clergyman in 1978. He and his wife moved to Y Rhiw, into "a tiny, unheated cottage in one of the most beautiful parts of Wales, where, however, the temperature sometimes dipped below freezing," according to Theodore Dalrymple. Free from church constraints, he was able to become more political and active in campaigns that were important to him. He became a fierce advocate of Welsh nationalism, although he never supported Plaid Cymru, as it recognised the Westminster Parliament and so in his view fell short in its opposition to England.

Thomas was nominated for the 1996 Nobel Prize in Literature, the winner of which was Wislawa Szymborska. He received the 1996 Lannan Literary Award for Lifetime Achievement.

Thomas died on 25 September 2000 aged 87, at his home in Pentrefelin near Criccieth, survived by his second wife, Elizabeth Vernon. He had been ill with a heart condition and treated at Ysbyty Gwynedd in Bangor until two weeks before he died. A memorial event celebrating his life and poetry was held at Westminster Abbey with readings from Heaney, Andrew Motion, Gillian Clarke and John Burnside. Thomas's ashes are buried near the door of St John's Church, Porthmadog, Gwynedd.

== Beliefs and contribution to spirituality ==
=== Religious views ===
Thomas's son, Gwydion, recalls his father's sermons, in which he would "drone on" to absurd lengths about the evil of refrigerators, washing machines, televisions and other modern devices. Thomas preached that they were all part of the temptation of scrambling after gadgets rather than attending to more spiritual needs. "It was the Machine, you see," Gwydion explained to a biographer. "This to a congregation that didn't have any of these things and were longing for them." Although he may have taken some ideas to extreme lengths, Theodore Dalrymple wrote, Thomas "was raising a deep and unanswered question: What is life for? Is it simply to consume more and more, and divert ourselves with ever more elaborate entertainments and gadgetry? What will this do to our souls?" He had a reputation, which perhaps he cultivated, of being not always charitable and sometimes awkward and taciturn. Some critics have interpreted photographs of him as indicating he was "formidable, bad-tempered, and apparently humourless."

In terms of religion, although he sometimes appeared to lack charity and patience, Thomas served as a Church in Wales parish priest all his working life. His training at St Michael's College, Llandaff, placed him somewhat in the Tractarian Tradition, though he does not seem to have been more than central in his position as regards the conduct of services. Although a fervent Welsh nationalist, he appears to have preferred the 1662 Book of Common Prayer of the Church of England (even in Welsh translation) over the 1966 order for the Holy Eucharist which the Church in Wales produced for itself and which came into use during his final year at Eglwys Fach. In one of his autobiographical books, he asserted that in retirement he could no longer bring himself to go to Holy Communion on account of the changes, although one of his successors at Aberdaron indicated that Thomas always retained the bishop's permission to officiate and occasionally did so at Llanfaelrhys, when no one else could be found. His prime objection to the revised services was that since the Second Vatican Council (1962–65) – which also had liturgical repercussions within Anglicanism – he could not bear to see the priest facing the people when in reality he should be leading the people towards God from the traditional east-facing position. "It is to God that the mystery belongs," he wrote pointedly, "and woe to man when he interferes with that mystery. As T. S. Eliot says: 'Humankind cannot bear very much reality.'"

Thomas seems early on to have become interested in Theosophy (an interest he did not pursue beyond some interfaith study) and over time he appears to have had some sympathy with the theological explorations of the one-time Bishop of Woolwich John A. T. Robinson in his 1963 Honest to God, on one occasion going as far as to describe the Resurrection of Christ as a "metaphor". In a letter to a theological student in 1993 he denied he held similar views to the non-realist Cambridge theologian and philosopher Don Cupitt. "I believe in revelation," Thomas wrote, "and therefore one cannot describe all one's insights as entirely human." Above all, his main influence appears to have been the philosopher Kierkegaard – and his "leap of faith" – although he also appears to have concerned himself with the limitations of religious language in an era becoming progressively more post-Christian in the face of science and philosophy. Yet for all his explorations, his sermons and practice as a priest do not seem to have been heterodox, even if in retirement he was to write to his long-term friend, the poet Raymond Garlick, to give him "the address of a retired Christian".

As a priest, it seems that Thomas did not believe he was there to promote his own views, but those of the church he served, and for all his vaunted crabbiness, he seems to have been well enough regarded by parishioners, though biographies offer notable exceptions. He has been credited by some as a capable listener and counsellor at a time when such things were not common among the clergy, and to have been a devoted visitor to the sick. However, his tendency to remoteness led one of his successors to say that she had, as parish priest of Aberdaron, to "do a lot of healing". Nonetheless, his influence as a poet had a considerable impact on spirituality, to the extent that on the centenary of his birth, Archbishop of Wales, Barry Morgan, who had known the poet personally, paid tribute to him:

R. S. Thomas continues to articulate through his poetry questions that are inscribed on the heart of most Christian pilgrims in their search for meaning and truth. We search for God and feel Him near at hand, only then to blink and find Him gone. This poetry persuades us that we are not alone in this experience of faith – the poet has been there before us.

== Other views ==
Thomas believed in what he called "the true Wales of my imagination", a Welsh-speaking aboriginal community in tune with the natural world. He viewed economic materialism (represented in his poetry by the mythical "Machine") as the destroyer of community. Thomas was hostile towards both English people who purchased homes and other properties in Wales and to those Welsh people who he perceived as being unnecessarily accommodating to them.

Thomas was an ardent supporter of the Campaign for Nuclear Disarmament (CND) and described himself as a pacifist, but also supported the nationalist Meibion Glyndŵr group, which carried out arson attacks against English-owned holiday cottages in rural Wales. On this subject he said in 1998, "What is one death against the death of the whole Welsh nation?" He was also active in wildlife preservation and worked with the RSPB and Welsh volunteer organisations for the preservation of the red kite. He resigned his RSPB membership over their plans to introduce non-native kites to Wales.

Thomas was an ardent supporter of Welsh independence, stating that it would make Wales poorer but arguing that was a sacrifice worth making.

== Works ==
Evans
Evans? Yes, many a time
I came down his bare flight
Of stairs into the gaunt kitchen
With its wood fire, where crickets sang
Accompaniment to the black kettle's
Whine, and so into the cold
Dark to smother in the thick tide
Of night that drifted about the walls
Of his stark farm on the hill ridge.

It was not the dark filling my eyes
And mouth appalled me; not even the drip
Of rain like blood from the one tree
Weather-tortured. It was the dark
Silting the veins of that sick man
I left stranded upon the vast
And lonely shore of his bleak bed.

— "Evans" from Poetry for Supper (1958)

Much of Thomas's work concerns the Welsh landscape and the Welsh people, themes with both political and spiritual subtext. His views on the position of the Welsh people as a conquered people are never far below the surface. As a cleric, his religious views are also present in his works. His earlier works focus on the personal stories of his parishioners, the farm labourers and working men and their wives, challenging the cosy view of the traditional pastoral poem with harsh and vivid descriptions of rural lives. The beauty of the landscape, although ever-present, is never suggested as a compensation for the low pay or monotonous conditions of farm work. This direct view of "country life" comes as a challenge to many English writers writing on similar subjects and challenging the more pastoral works of contemporary poets such as Dylan Thomas.

Thomas's later works were of a more metaphysical nature, more experimental in their style and focusing more overtly on his spirituality. Laboratories of the Spirit (1975) gives, in its title, a hint at this development and also reveals Thomas's increasing experiments with scientific metaphor. He described this shift as an investigation into the "adult geometry of the mind". Fearing that poetry was becoming a dying art, inaccessible to those who most needed it, "he attempted to make spiritually minded poems relevant within, and relevant to, a science-minded, post-industrial world," to represent that world both in form and in content even as he rejected its machinations.

Despite his nationalism Thomas could be hard on his fellow countrymen. Often his works read more as a criticism of Welshness than a celebration. He said there is a "lack of love for human beings" in his poetry. Other critics have been less harsh. Al Alvarez said, "He was wonderful, very pure, very bitter, but the bitterness was beautifully and very sparely rendered. He was completely authoritative, a very, very fine poet, completely off on his own, out of the loop but a real individual. It's not about being a major or minor poet. It's about getting a work absolutely right by your own standards and he did that wonderfully well."

Thomas's final works commonly sold 20,000 copies in Britain alone. M. Wynn Thomas said: "He was the Aleksandr Solzhenitsyn of Wales because he was such a troubler of the Welsh conscience. He was one of the major English language and European poets of the 20th century."

== Books ==
- The Stones of the Field (1946) Druid Press, Carmarthen
- An Acre of Land (1952) Montgomeryshire Printing Co, Newtown
- The Minister (1953) Montgomeryshire Printing Co, Newtown
- Song at the Year's Turning (1955) Rupert Hart-Davis, London
- Poetry for Supper (1958) Rupert Hart-Davis, London
- Judgement Day, Poetry Book Society, 1960
- Tares, [Corn-weed] (1961) Rupert Hart-Davis, London
- The Bread of Truth (1963) Rupert Hart-Davis, London
- Words and the Poet (1964, lecture) University of Wales Press, Cardiff
- Pietà (1966) Rupert Hart-Davis, London
- The Mountains (1968) illustrations by John Piper, Chilmark Press
- Postcard: Song (1968) Fishpaste Postcard Series
- Not That He Brought Flowers (1968) Rupert Hart-Davis, London
- H'm (1972) Macmillan, London
- Selected Poems, 1946–1968, Hart-Davis MacGibbon, 1973 and St. Martin's Press, New York, 1974; Bloodaxe Books, Newcastle upon Tyne, 1986
- What is a Welshman? (1974) Christopher Davies Publishers, Swansea
- Laboratories of the Spirit (1975) Macmillan, London
- Abercuawg (1976, lecture) Cyngor Celfyddydau Cymru
- The Way of It (1977) Ceolfrith Press, Sunderland,
- Frequencies (1978) Macmillan, London
- Between Here and Now (1981) Macmillan, London
- Later Poems, 1972–1982 (1983) Macmillan (London)
- A Selection of Poetry (1983) edited by D. J. Hignett, Hignett School Services
- Poets' Meeting (1983) Celandine
- Ingrowing Thoughts (1985) Poetry Wales Press, Bridgend
- Neb (1985) (Welsh, third person autobiography), Gwasg Gwynedd, Caernarfon
- Destinations (1985) Celandine
- Poems of R. S. Thomas (1985) University of Arkansas Press
- Experimenting with an Amen (1986) Macmillan, London
- Welsh Airs (1987) Seren, Bridgend
- The Echoes Return Slow (1988) Macmillan, London
- Counterpoint (1990) Bloodaxe Books, Newcastle upon Tyne
- Blwyddyn yn Llŷn (1990) (in Welsh)
- Pe Medrwn Yr Iaith : ac ysgrifau eraill ed. Tony Brown & Bedwyr L. Jones, (1990) (essays, in Welsh) Christopher Davies Publishers, Swansea
- Cymru or Wales? (1992) Gomer Press
- Mass for Hard Times (1992) Bloodaxe Books, Newcastle upon Tyne
- Collected Poems, 1945–1990 (1993) Dent
- No Truce with the Furies (1995) Bloodaxe Books, Newcastle upon Tyne
- Autobiographies (1997, translations from Welsh) trans. Jason Walford Davies Phoenix Books, London
- Residues (2002, posthumously) Bloodaxe Books, Tarset
- Collected Later Poems 1988–2000 (2004, posthumously) Bloodaxe Books, Tarset
- Uncollected Poems ed. Tony Brown & Jason Walford Davies (2013, posthumously) Bloodaxe Books, Tarset
- Too Brave to Dream: Encounters with Modern Art ed. Tony Brown & Jason Walford Davies (2016, posthumously) Bloodaxe Books, Hexham

== Sources ==
- Morgan, Christopher (2003). R.S. Thomas: Identity, environment, and deity. Manchester: Manchester University Press. ISBN 0-7190-6248-9.
- Brown, Tony (2006). R.S. Thomas. Cardiff: University of Wales Press. ISBN 0-7083-1800-2.
- Morgan, Barry (2006). Strangely Orthodox: R. S. Thomas and his Poetry of Faith. Llandysul: Gomer Press. ISBN 1-84323-682-6.
- Rogers, Byron (2006). The Man Who Went into The West, The Life of R. S. Thomas. London: Aurum Press. ISBN 1-84513-146-0.
- Westover, Daniel (2011). R. S. Thomas: A Stylistic Biography. Cardiff: University of Wales Press. ISBN 978-0-7083-2411-0.
