= Llanfaelrhys =

Coordinates: 52.809°N 4.656°W

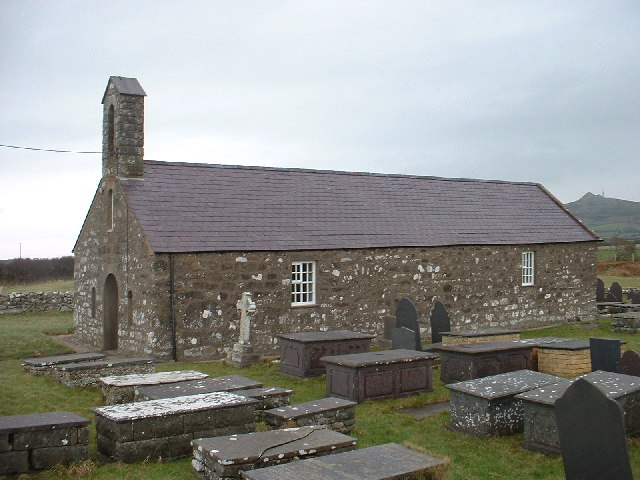
- St Maelrhys Chapel

- Location within Gwynedd
- OS grid reference: SH210268
- Community: Aberdaron
- Principal area: Gwynedd
- Preserved county: Gwynedd
- Country: Wales
- Sovereign state: United Kingdom
- Post town: PWLLHELI
- Postcode district: LL53
- Dialling code: 01758
- Police: North Wales
- Fire: North Wales
- Ambulance: Welsh
- UK Parliament: Dwyfor Meirionnydd
- Senedd Cymru – Welsh Parliament: Dwyfor Meirionnydd

Llanfaelrhys is a village and former civil parish in the Welsh county of Gwynedd, located on the Llŷn Peninsula. The parish was abolished in 1934 and incorporated into Aberdaron.
