= Red Canna (paintings) =

Georgia O'Keeffe series (1915–1927)

- Artist: Georgia O'Keeffe
- Year: 1924
- Medium: Oil
- Dimensions: 73.7 cm × 45.7 cm (29.0 in × 18.0 in)

Georgia O'Keeffe made a number of Red Canna paintings of the canna lily plant, first in watercolor, such as a red canna flower bouquet painted in 1915, but primarily abstract paintings of close-up images in oil. O'Keeffe said that she made the paintings to reflect the way she herself saw flowers, although others have called her depictions erotic, and compared them to female genitalia. O'Keeffe said they had misconstrued her intentions for doing her flower paintings: "Well – I made you take time to look at what I saw and when you took time to really notice my flower you hung all your own associations with flowers on my flower and you write about my flower as if I think and see what you think and see of the flower – and I don't."

O'Keeffe was aware of the sexual implications in her work, but male art reviewers' misinterpretations of these references reinforced a sexual perception of her work that was diametrically opposed to her original goal. She expressed herself through the use of vibrant colors like red, yellow, and orange.

== Background ==
A gardener, O'Keeffe was often inspired to make a dozen or more paintings of a specific flower. She became interested in brilliant colors and billowy petals of the canna lilies when she visited Lake George, New York in 1918 with Alfred Stieglitz. The Pennsylvania Academy of the Fine Arts states that "In these extreme close-ups she established a new kind of modern still life with no references to atmospheric effects or realistic details, reflecting her statement, 'I paint because color is significant.'"

As she evolved as an artist, her works became suggestive of female form, like Inside Red Canna. Paul Rosenfeld, who owned one of her Red Canna paintings, said "... there is no stroke laid by her brush, whatever it is she may paint, that is not curiously, arrestingly female in quality. Essence of very womanhood permeates her pictures."

== Red Canna (1915) watercolor ==
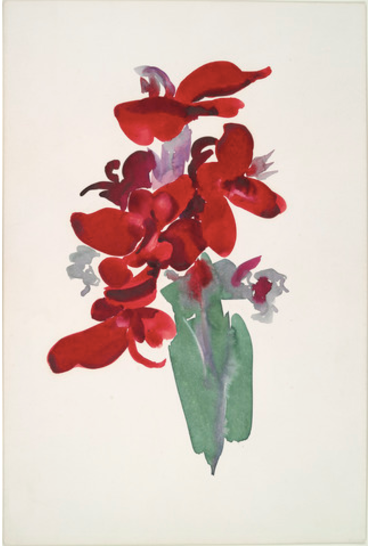
Georgia O'Keeffe, Red Canna, 1915, Yale University Art Gallery

In 1915, O'Keeffe painted a watercolor of a bouquet of red canna blossoms on paper. The work, 19 3/8 by 13 inches (49.2 cm × 33.0 cm), is among the collection of the Yale University Art Gallery.

== Small Red Canna (1919) ==
A small painting of a close-up of a red canna lily was made by O'Keeffe in 1919. The 8 in × 6 in (20.3 cm × 15.2 cm) oil painting depicts the flower against a dark cloudy background. Owned by a private collector, it is on extended loan to the Georgia O'Keeffe Museum. It was stolen from the Santa Fe, New Mexico museum by a security guard, William Crumpton, who pleaded guilty on October 26, 2004 to stealing paintings and cash from the museum and a government office. The painting, valued at equivalent to $852,273 in 2025, was recovered.

== Red Canna (1919) ==
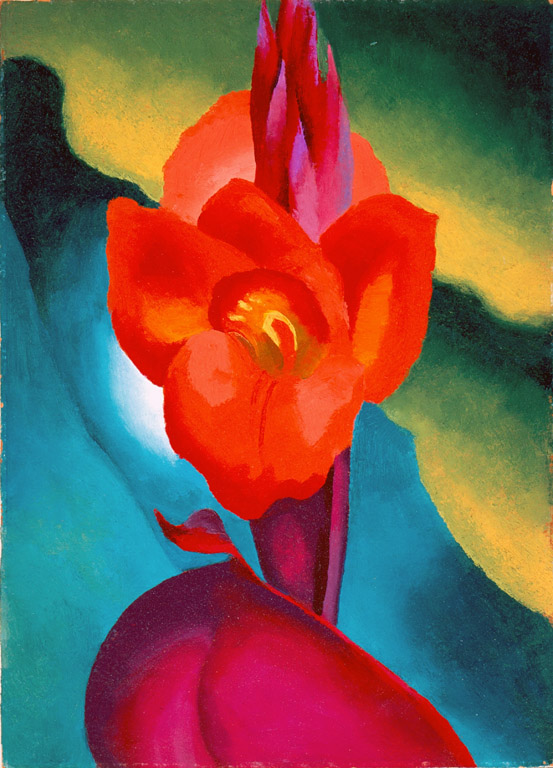
Georgia O'Keeffe, Red Canna, 1919, High Museum of Art, Atlanta

Painted in oil on a 13 in × 9 1/2 in (33.0 cm × 24.1 cm) board, the red canna lily framed by green and dark yellow background colors at the top and right of the painting and dark blue at the bottom and left. The carefully blended colors and voluptuous curves reflect her emerging personal style. Once owned by Pollitzer family members of North Carolina, it was displayed at Columbia College in South Carolina, where O'Keeffe was an instructor. The painting was acquired by High Museum of Art of Atlanta by 2015.

== Inside Red Canna (1919) ==
She painted an extreme close-up of the canna lily entitled Inside the Red Canna in 1919. It is a depiction of the large petals of the exterior of the flower, with focus on the interior through the use of contrasting shades of colors. The painting was made with red, orange, brown, and pink paint. The 22 in × 17 in (56 cm × 43 cm) abstract oil painting is owned by private collectors.

O'Keeffe's Red Canna (1923)

Abstraction so close up—one is immersed reds swelling from whites to pinks soft velvet reds
bleed into liquid rubies teasing like a swirling
skirt softly blowing in the
breeze—morning sunlight looking
through the vibrant blood
of life awakening the
morning light sun parting
vibrations of pounding hearts

— Image to Word: Art and Creative Writing

== Red Canna (1923) ==
The version made in 1923 is an oil painting of a red canna lily against a yellow background. The Lily nearly fills the 12 in × 10 in (30 cm × 25 cm) canvas. It is owned by the Pennsylvania Academy of the Fine Arts in Philadelphia, Pennsylvania.

== Red Canna (1924) ==
External images
- Red Canna, 1923, Pennsylvania Academy of the Fine Arts
- Red Canna, 1927, Amon Carter Museum of American Art

The 1924 painting, a close-up of the flower with streaks of light blue and gray, immerses the viewer in the blossom, and is meant to convey the way that O'Keeffe experiences it.

In the 1920s it was believed to be among the collection of Flora Stieglitz Strauss and possibly that of O'Keeffe in 1953. It was in private collections until 1993, when it was acquired by Sotheby's in New York. It was last recorded to be in the private collection of A. Alfred Taubman.

== Red Canna (1925–1926) ==
She painted the interior of the flower in reds, oranges, yellows, and pinks. Painted in oil, the abstract painting is 36 by 30 inches (91 cm × 76 cm). It is owned by the University of Arizona Museum of Art.

== Red and Orange Canna (1926) ==
Another close-up painted in oil, the 20 in × 16 in (51 cm × 41 cm) painting is among the collection of the Georgia O'Keeffe Museum.

== Red Cannas (1927) ==
In 1927, O'Keeffe made a painting of a close-up of the wide red petals of the canna lily. Painted in oil, it is 36 1/8 by 30 1/8 inches (91.8 cm × 76.5 cm). Once among private collections, it is now owned by Amon Carter Museum of American Art in Fort Worth, Texas.
