= Early works of Georgia O'Keeffe =

Paintings by Georgia O'Keeffe

The early works of American artist Georgia O'Keeffe are those made before she was introduced to the principles of Arthur Wesley Dow in 1912.

== Childhood education ==
By age ten she had decided to become an artist. Her grandmothers, Isabella Totto and Catherine O'Keeffe, painted still lifes and flowers. Her sisters, Catherine and Ida, made and sold their paintings and Anita, another sister, also painted. When she was eleven, art lessons were arranged for her and her younger sisters, Ida and Anita, at their home.

She and her sister received art instruction from local watercolorist Sara Mann, who taught her to copy images from Text Books for Art Education by Louis Prang. The books showed how to create simple shapes and up to complex compositions. Although she appreciated learning how to create two-dimensional images of nature, she knew at that time that she did not want to be an artist that created traditional works of art and had little interest in painting portraits.

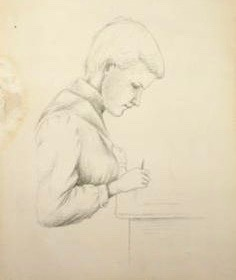
Georgia O'Keeffe, Untitled (Seated Figure), 1901–1902, graphite on paper

O'Keeffe attended high school at Sacred Heart Academy in Madison, Wisconsin as a boarder between 1901 and 1902, and her parents provided extra tuition for art classes—using crayon, charcoal or oil paints—that were taught by a nun with high expectations, Sister Angelique. When her family moved to Williamsburg, Virginia in late 1902, O'Keeffe and her brother, Francis, stayed in Wisconsin with her aunt, Lenore Totto, who was a school teacher. Her art studies at the high school allowed her to further develop her skills in making images of flowers, like a surviving watercolor of tiny cherry blossoms. She was proud of a watercolor that she created of a lighthouse on moonlit night. The foreground depicts a green grass, trees, and a path leading to the lighthouse. A sailboat is at sea under a moon and a cloudy sky. Although it was an early work, it conveyed a romantic mood and was a complex composition.

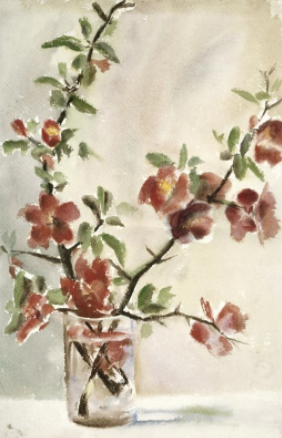
Georgia O'Keeffe, Untitled, vase of flowers, watercolor on paper, 17 3/4 x 11 1/2 in. (45.1 x 29.2 cm), between 1903 and 1905

She joined her family in Virginia in 1903 and completed high school as a boarder at Chatham Episcopal Institute in Virginia (now Chatham Hall) and graduated in 1905. Elizabeth May Willis, who studied at Art Students League of New York, was her art teacher and the principal of the school. Willis gave O'Keeffe special privileges, including being able to use the art school room after school hours. While at Chatham, sometime between 1903 and 1905, she made a watercolor painting of a vase of red flowers with green leaves as a study. The watercolor paintings that she liked the most from that period include one of ears of yellow and red corn, which the school kept as an example of a student's best work, and another of a bunch of lilacs. O'Keeffe, the art director of the school's 1905 yearbook, illustrated the book with her cartoons, drawings, and illustrations. They reflect an interest in Art Nouveau, pointillism, symbolism, and the works of Charles Dana Gibson. Willis urged the O'Keeffes to send their daughter to the School of the Art Institute of Chicago.

== Advanced training ==
O'Keeffe studied and ranked at the top of her class at the School of the Art Institute of Chicago from 1905 to 1906, studying with John Vanderpoel. She began her studies with the intention of becoming a teacher, which was considered a practical occupation for a woman. For financial reasons, O'Keeffe lived on Indiana Avenue with Ollie and Charles Totto, siblings of her mother. Chicago was the center of the Arts and Crafts movement and many of the buildings were Art Nouveau style architecture. Her education, though, began by creating drawings of plaster casts. The school focused on traditional forms of art over modern forms of art, like Impressionism.

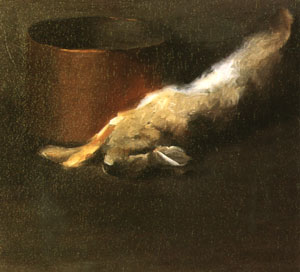
Georgia O'Keeffe, Untitled, Dead Rabbit with Copper Pot, 1908, Art Students League of New York

In 1907, she attended the Art Students League in New York City, where she studied under William Merritt Chase, Kenyon Cox and F. Luis Mora.

She won the League's William Merritt Chase still-life prize for her oil painting Dead Rabbit with Copper Pot in 1908. Her prize was a scholarship to attend the League's outdoor summer school in Lake George, New York.

In 1908, O'Keeffe found out that she would not be able to finance her studies. Her father had gone bankrupt and her mother was seriously ill with tuberculosis. She also was not interested in creating a career as a painter based upon the mimetic tradition which had formed the basis of her art training. She took a job in Chicago as a commercial artist and worked there until 1910, when she returned to Virginia to recuperate from a case of the measles and later moved with her family to Charlottesville. She did not paint for four years, and said that the smell of turpentine made her sick. She began teaching art in 1911. One of her positions was her former school, Chatham Episcopal Institute in Virginia.

== University of Virginia ==
She took a summer art class in 1912 at the University of Virginia from Alon Bemet, who was a Columbia University Teachers College faculty member. Under Bemet, she learned of innovative ideas of Arthur Wesley Dow, a colleague of her instructor. Dow's approach was influenced by principles of Japanese art regarding design and composition. She began to experiment with abstract compositions and develop a personal style that veered away from realism and towards abstract art.

O'Keeffe's paintings from this period were shown at the 2016-17 exhibition O'Keeffe at the University of Virginia, 1912–1914.
