= Ghost Ranch Lodge & Restaurant =

Motel in Tuscon, Arizona, U.S.

Coordinates: 32.2602°N 110.9855°W

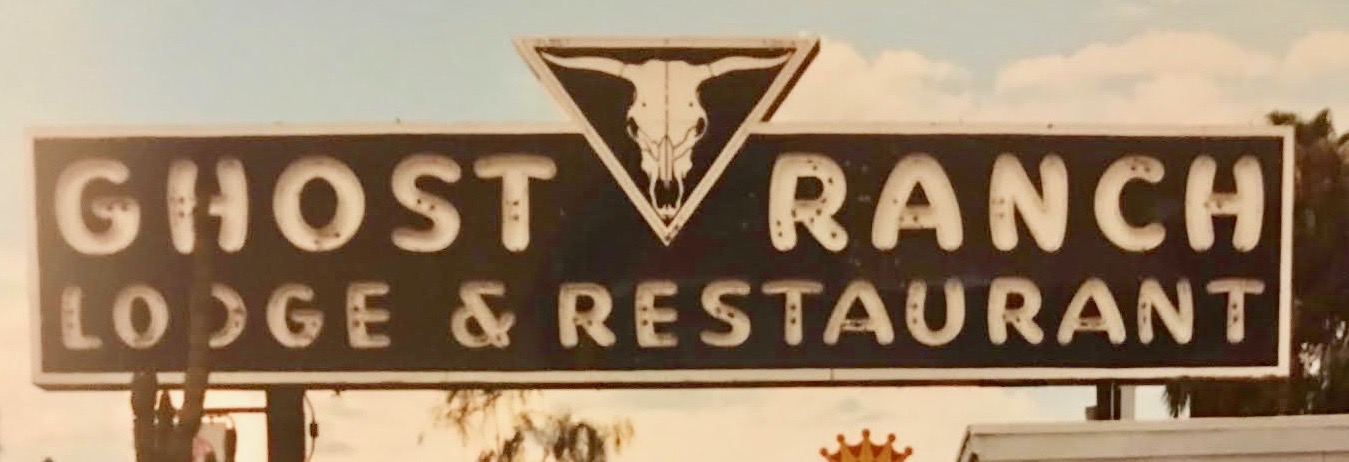
- Ghost Ranch Lodge & Restaurant neon sign, logo by Georgia O'Keeffe
- Industry: Motel
- Founded: 1941
- Owner: Arthur and Phoebe Pack

Ghost Ranch Lodge & Restaurant was a motel at 801 West Miracle Mile Rd. in Tucson, Arizona. It was constructed in 1941.

== History ==
The lodge's first original eight buildings, designed by Josias Joesler in 1941, were built on Tucson's Ghost Ranch. The lodge's cattle skull logo was designed by Georgia O'Keeffe. Its original owner was Arthur Pack, co-founder of the Arizona-Sonora Desert Museum, and his wife, Phoebe.

In 2010, the Urban Land Institute conducted a case study and tour of the lodge. In 2011, the lodge was one of a few remaining "motor courts" left on Tucson's Miracle Mile. It shuttered in 2005. Atlantic Development + Investments bought the property in foreclosure in 2007 after a fire damaged the lodge; they redeveloped the lodge with 30 restored Joesler units and 30 new ones. The next phase of the redevelopment was completed in 2011; an additional 52 units were added to the property, and the lodge's historic cactus garden was rehabilitated. Ultimately, the project was transformed into affordable senior housing and housing for people with physical disabilities.

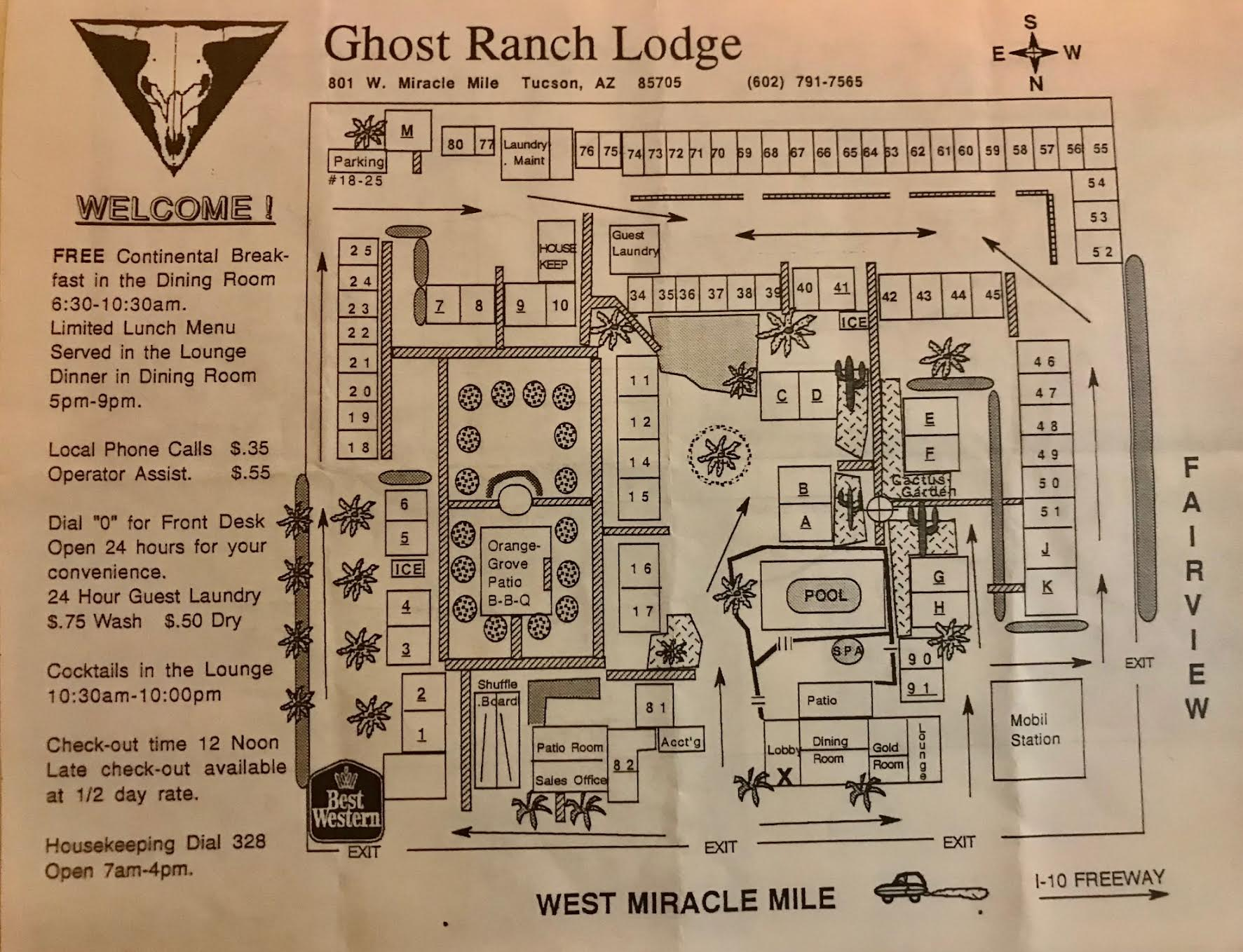
Map of Ghost Ranch Lodge & Restaurant from 1996.

In 2012, the lodge property was nominated for a spot on the National Register of Historic Places. In 2015 the lodge was awarded the National Development Council Academy Award in the affordable housing category at the National Development Council Academy luncheon in Washington, D.C.

=== Architecture ===
The lodge was rendered in a Spanish Colonial ranch style. The lodge's front porches faced a shared courtyard. As they were designed prior to the inception of air conditioning, they were an example of passive cooling, with big porches. The lodge property contains a historic cactus garden as well as the largest Boojum tree in the state of Arizona.
