= Ida O'Keeffe =

American visual artist

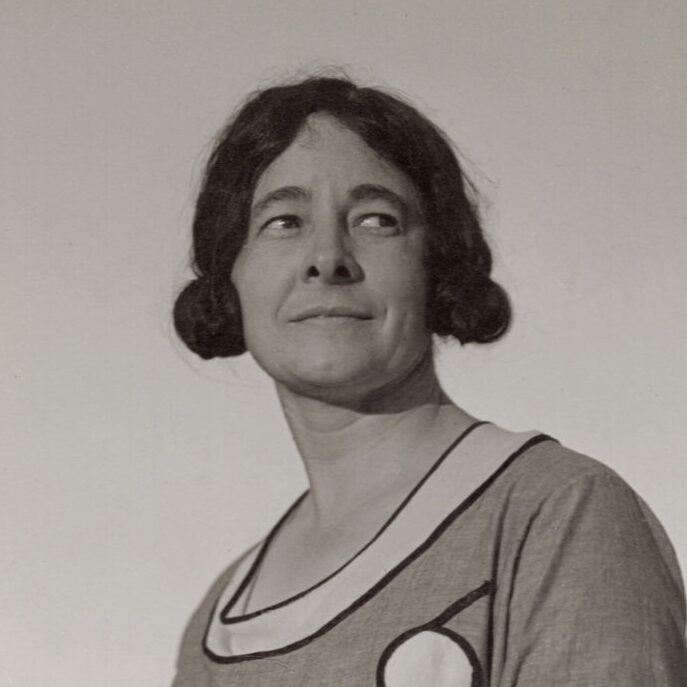
- Born: Ida Ten Eyck O'Keeffe; October 23, 1889; Sun Prairie, Wisconsin, US
- Died: September 27, 1961 (aged 71); Whittier, California, US
- Other name: Ida Ten Eyck
- Education: Columbia University
- Family: Georgia O'Keeffe (sister)

Ida Ten Eyck O'Keeffe (October 23, 1889 – September 27, 1961) was an American visual artist known for oil paintings, watercolors, and monotypes. She was the younger sister of painter Georgia O'Keeffe.

== Early life and career ==
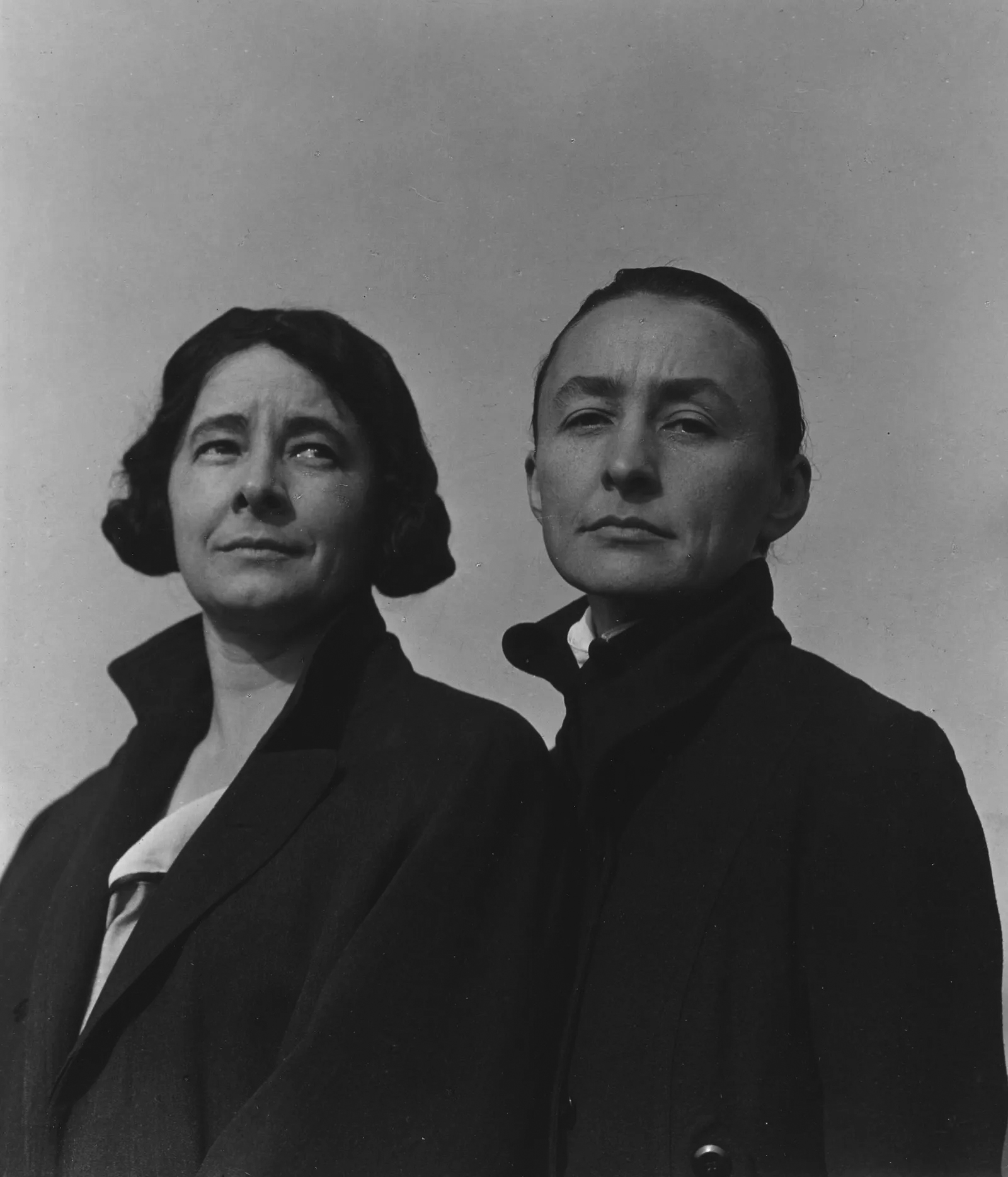
Ida and her sister Georgia O'Keeffe, photographed by Alfred Stieglitz

Ida O'Keeffe was born in Sun Prairie, Wisconsin, on October 23, 1889. She was the third of seven children. When Ida was 13, the family moved to Williamsburg, Virginia, where O'Keeffe took drawing classes in summer school at the University of Virginia. With her younger sister Anita and her more famous older sister Georgia, she studied art with local watercolor artist Sara Mann. They also had two grandmothers who were artists.

O'Keeffe's artistic start was as a printmaker. She then briefly worked as a nurse before earning her Master of Fine Arts degree from Columbia University. She painted approximately 70 canvases during her career. Her major themes included colorful, abstracted landscapes, and naturalistic still lifes. A number of her works feature lighthouses. She exhibited some works with her sisters Catherine and Georgia. Georgia gained more fame, partly because of a husband who worked as a well-known photographer and gallerist.Ten Eyck O'Keeffe is known to have said, "I'd be famous, too, if I'd have had a Stieglitz." A 1933 review in a newspaper read "Georgia remains supreme." O'Keeffe taught art and was chair of the Art Department at Pembroke State College for Indians—today the University of North Carolina at Pembroke—from 1941 to 1942.

=== Collections and exhibitions ===
O'Keeffe's first exhibition was in 1927 at the Opportunity Gallery in New York, where she was identified as Ida Ten Eyck, to avoid being compared to her sister, Georgia. In 1974, she was featured in an exhibition in Santa Fe. She was featured in a solo exhibition at the Dallas Museum of Art entitled "Ida O'Keeffe: Escaping Georgia's Shadow". Her works were on display at the Clark Art Institute from July to October 2019. A number of her works may be found in private collections.

== Death ==
O'Keeffe died of a stroke on September 27, 1961, in Whittier, California.
