= Blue and Green Music =

Painting by Georgia O'Keeffe

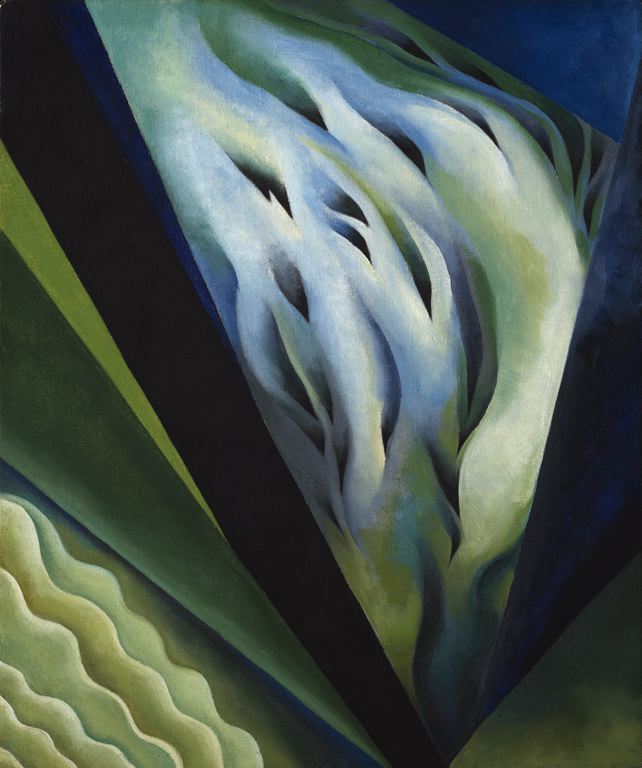
- Artist: Georgia O'Keeffe
- Year: 1919–1921
- Medium: Oil on canvas
- Dimensions: 58.4 cm × 48.3 cm (23.0 in × 19.0 in)
- Location: The Art Institute of Chicago, Chicago

Blue and Green Music is an oil on canvas painting by the American painter Georgia O'Keeffe, from 1919 to 1921.

Painted during her New York years, Blue and Green Music uses the contrast of hard and soft edges and geometric forms to convey the rhythm and movement of music.

== History and description ==
The painting uses colors with an intent to capture the variance of tones that one would find in music. O'Keeffe described music as being able to be "translated into something for the eye".

This piece was made while O'Keeffe was living in New York with Alfred Stieglitz. She created many works that referenced music during this time period, saying, "I found that I could say things with color and shapes that I couldn't say any other way—things that I had no words for."

The painting is part of the Alfred Stieglitz collection, a gift by the artist to the museum in memory of her husband.
