= Jimson Weed (painting) =

Painting by Georgia O'Keeffe

- Artist: Georgia O'Keeffe
- Year: 1936
- Type: Oil on linen
- Dimensions: 180 cm × 212 cm (71 in × 83.5 in)
- Location: Indianapolis Museum of Art; Indianapolis

Jimson Weed is an oil on linen painting by American artist Georgia O'Keeffe from 1936, located in the Indianapolis Museum of Art in Indianapolis, Indiana. It depicts four large blossoms of jimson weed.

== Description ==
O'Keeffe reiterated the pinwheel-shaped flowers' structure in the tight placement of the four blossoms in the painting. Her use of rhythmic light and shade and a simplified palette underscores their fresh, simple beauty.

== Historical information ==
O'Keeffe was immensely fond of jimson weed, a species of Datura. She ignored its seeds' toxicity, allowing it to flourish around the patio of her home in the New Mexican desert. She paid tribute to the bloom in this painting, originally entitled Miracle Flower. Jimson Weed was commissioned by cosmetics magnate Elizabeth Arden for the new Gymnasium Moderne of her Fifth Avenue Salon in New York City. Placed in the exercise room, the unfurling blossoms were meant to encourage clients in their stretches. Arden paid $10,000 for the largest floral composition O'Keeffe would ever create.

=== Acquisition ===
The painting was acquired by the Indianapolis Museum of Art in 1997, a gift of Eli Lilly and Company. It is displayed in the Paine American Modernism Gallery.

=== Similar work ===
An older, but similar work by O'Keeffe, Jimson Weed/White Flower No. 1 (1932), focusing on only a single flower, was sold by the Georgia O'Keeffe Museum at auction to Walmart heiress Alice Walton in 2014 for $44,405,000, more than tripling the previous world record auction for a piece by a female artist. The painting is held by the Crystal Bridges Museum of American Art.

== See also ==
- Still life
- Modernism
