= Ram's Head, White Hollyhock-Hills =

1935 painting by Georgia O'Keeffe

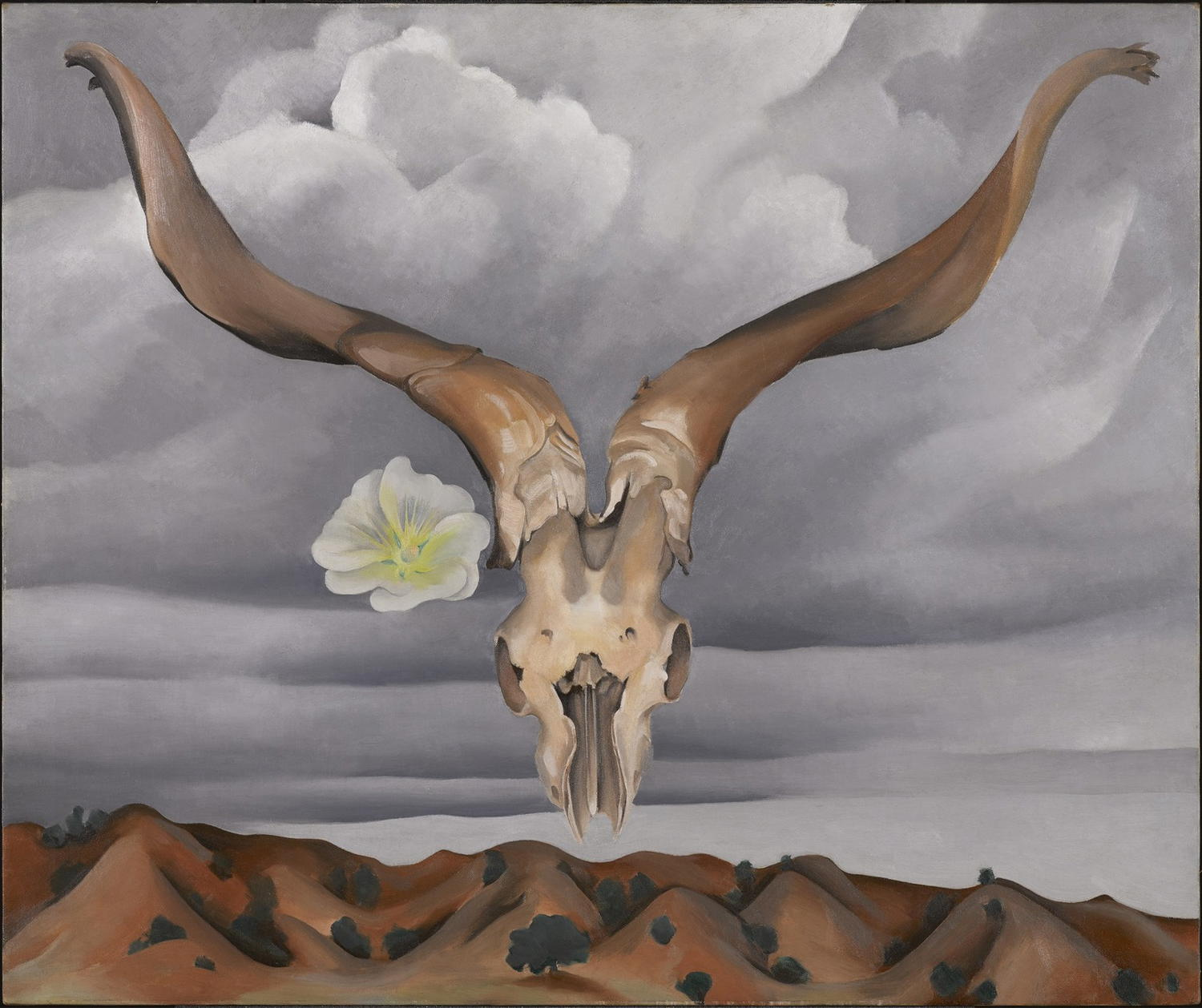
- Artist: Georgia O'Keeffe
- Year: 1935
- Medium: Oil on canvas
- Dimensions: 76.2 cm × 91.4 cm (30 in × 36 in)
- Location: Brooklyn Museum, Brooklyn

Ram's Head, White Hollyhock-Hills is a 1935 oil painting on canvas by American painter Georgia O'Keeffe. It is held in the Brooklyn Museum. It depicts the bones of a ram's skull and a white hollyhock blossom floating against a New Mexico landscape.

The painting marked the start of a stylistic turn for O'Keeffe, as it was more non-realist and surreal than her previous works. The use of a ram's skull was probably influenced by the Dust Bowl, during which animal bones were a common subject of photographs in the region.

Critic Lewis Mumford wrote that it was "one of the most brilliant paintings O’Keeffe has done." Art historians Deanna MacDonald and Geoff Smith selected the painting for their book 100 Best Paintings in New York, writing that it "resonates with expressive color, innate sensuality and an affinity to nature."
