= Georgia O'Keeffe =

American modernist artist (1887–1986)

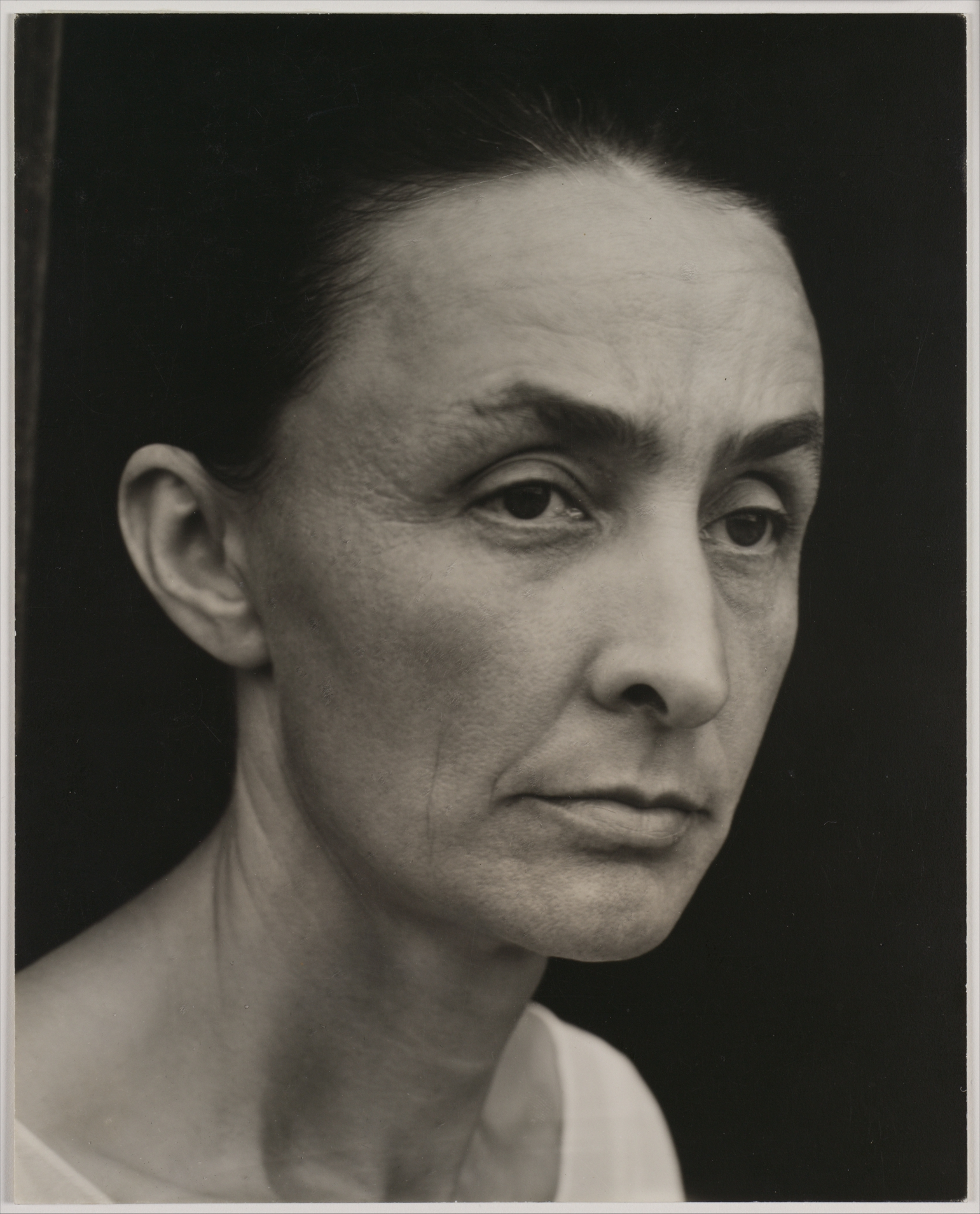
- O'Keeffe in 1932, photograph by Alfred Stieglitz
- Born: Georgia Totto O'Keeffe; November 15, 1887; Sun Prairie, Wisconsin, U.S.
- Died: March 6, 1986 (aged 98); Santa Fe, New Mexico, U.S.
- Known for: Visual arts: painting, sculpture, photography
- Notable work: Black Iris; Jimson Weed
- Movement: American modernism, Precisionism
- Spouse: Alfred Stieglitz (m. 1924; died 1946)
- Family: Ida O'Keeffe (sister)
- Awards: National Medal of Arts (1985); Presidential Medal of Freedom (1977); Edward MacDowell Medal (1972)

Georgia Totto O'Keeffe (November 15, 1887 – March 6, 1986) was an American modernist painter and draftswoman whose career spanned seven decades and whose work remained largely independent of major art movements. Called the "Mother of American modernism", O'Keeffe gained international recognition for her paintings of natural forms, particularly flowers, hills and desert-inspired landscapes, which were often drawn from and related to places and environments in which she lived. Although her work is often interpreted from a feminist perspective, she did not want to be seen as a "woman artist"; she wanted to be seen as an artist.

From 1905, when O'Keeffe began her studies at the School of the Art Institute of Chicago, until about 1920, she studied art or earned money as a commercial illustrator or teacher to pay for further education. Influenced by Arthur Wesley Dow, she began to develop her unique style through her watercolors during her studies at the University of Virginia and, more dramatically, through the charcoal drawings she produced in 1915 that marked her move toward abstraction. Alfred Stieglitz, an art dealer and photographer, held an exhibit of her works in 1916. Over the next couple of years, she taught and continued her studies at the Teachers College, Columbia University.

In June of 1918 O’Keeffe was invited by Stieglitz to live and work in New York City and accepted this invitation as well as his offer to underwrite her year of painting in the city. She resigned from teaching at West Texas State to do so. Stieglitz and O'Keeffe developed a professional and personal relationship that led to their marriage on December 11, 1924. In New York, O’Keeffe created many reflections of her perception of the city through oil paint, charcoal, pastel, and watercolor. She looked back fondly at her pieces from this time, calling them ‘My New Yorks’. During this time, O'Keeffe created many forms of abstract art besides those of the city, including close-ups of flowers, such as the popular Red Canna paintings.

O'Keeffe and Stieglitz lived together in New York until 1929, when O'Keeffe began spending part of the year in the Southwest, which served as inspiration for her paintings of New Mexico landscapes and images of animal skulls, such as Cow's Skull: Red, White, and Blue (1931) and Summer Days (1936). She moved to New Mexico in 1949, three years after Stieglitz's death in 1946, where she lived for the next 40 years at her home and studio or Ghost Ranch summer home in Abiquiú, and in the last years of her life, in Santa Fe. In 2014, O'Keeffe's 1932 painting Jimson Weed/White Flower No. 1 sold for $44,405,000—at the time, by far the largest price paid for any painting by a female artist. Her works are in the collections of several museums, and following her death, the Georgia O'Keeffe Museum was established in Santa Fe.

== Early life and education (1887–1916) ==
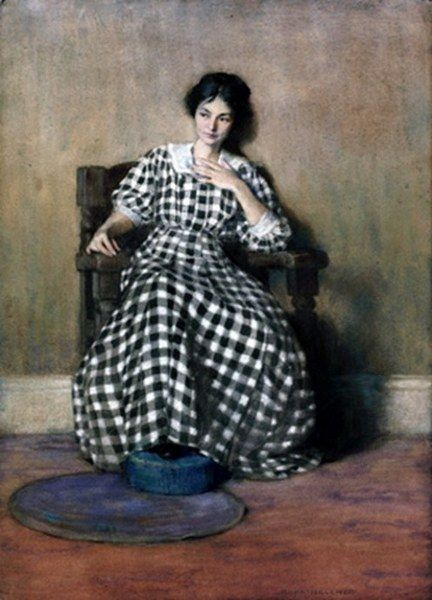
Hilda Belcher, The Checkered Dress, 1907, Frances Lehman Loeb Art Center at Vassar College. The painting is likely a portrait of Georgia O'Keeffe. (Note: Vassar College and the Smithsonian Institution state that the sitter is identified as O'Keeffe. The book A Woman on Paper: Georgia O'Keeffe by Anita Pollitzer states that the painting is a portrait of O'Keeffe. The Georgia O'Keeffe Museum does not say the painting is of O'Keeffe, but the record of the painting is filed in a category for Georgia O'Keeffe photographs and clippings.)

Georgia O'Keeffe was born on November 15, 1887, in a farmhouse in the town of Sun Prairie, Wisconsin. Her parents, Francis Calyxtus O'Keeffe and Ida (Totto) O'Keeffe, were dairy farmers. Her father was of Irish descent. Her mother's father, George Victor Totto, for whom O'Keeffe was named, was a Hungarian count who came to the United States in 1848.

O'Keeffe was the second of seven children. She attended Town Hall School in Sun Prairie. By age 10, she had decided to become an artist. With her sisters, Ida and Anita, she received art instruction from local watercolorist Sara Mann. O'Keeffe attended high school at Sacred Heart Academy in Madison, Wisconsin, as a boarder between 1901 and 1902. In late 1902, the O'Keeffes moved from Wisconsin to the close-knit neighborhood of Peacock Hill in Williamsburg, Virginia, where O'Keeffe's father started a business making rusticated cast concrete block in anticipation of a demand for the block in the Virginia Peninsula building trade, but the demand never materialized. O'Keeffe stayed in Wisconsin attending Madison Central High School until joining her family in Virginia in 1903. She completed high school as a boarder at Chatham Episcopal Institute in Virginia (now Chatham Hall), graduating in 1905. At Chatham, she was a member of Kappa Delta sorority. Her development towards art had taken place during a movement called "New Woman", which focused on educational and professional opportunity expansion for women in the early twentieth century.

O'Keeffe taught and headed the art department at West Texas State Normal College, watching over her youngest sibling, Claudia, at her mother's request. In 1917, she visited her brother, Alexis, at a military camp in Texas before he shipped out for Europe during World War I. While there, she created the painting The Flag, which expressed her anxiety and depression about the war.

Early works

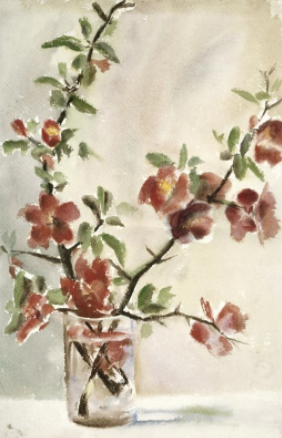
Untitled (Vase of Flowers), 1903–1905, watercolor on paper, Georgia O'Keeffe Museum

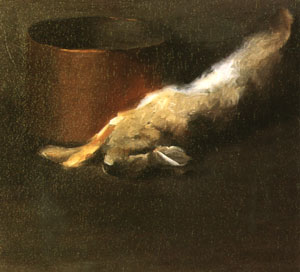
Untitled (Dead Rabbit with the Copper Pot), 1908, Art Students League of New York

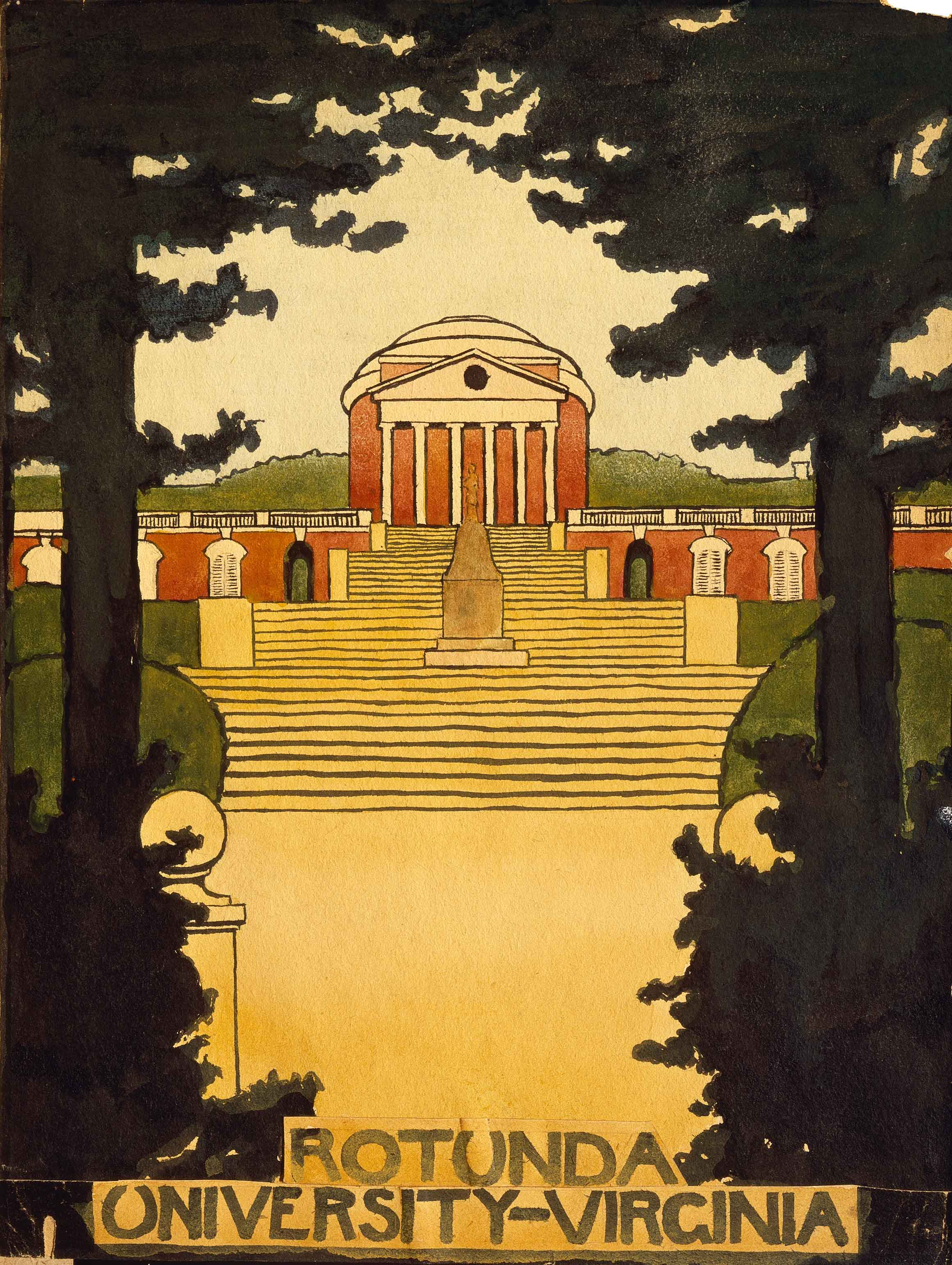
Scrapbook (The Rotunda at University of Virginia), 1912–1914, watercolor on paper, University of Virginia

=== Academic training ===
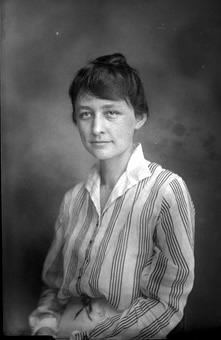
Georgia O'Keeffe as a teaching assistant to Alon Bement at the University of Virginia in 1915

From 1905 to 1906, O'Keeffe was enrolled at the School of the Art Institute of Chicago, where she studied with John Vanderpoel and ranked at the top of her class. As a result of contracting typhoid fever, she had to take a year off from her education. In 1907, she attended the Art Students League in New York City, where she studied under William Merritt Chase, Kenyon Cox, and F. Luis Mora. In 1908, she won the League's William Merritt Chase still-life prize for her oil painting Dead Rabbit with Copper Pot. Her prize was a scholarship to attend the League's outdoor summer school in Lake George, New York. While in New York City, O'Keeffe visited galleries, such as 291, co-owned by her future husband, photographer Alfred Stieglitz. The gallery promoted the work of avant-garde artists and photographers from the United States and Europe.

In 1908, O'Keeffe discovered that she would not be able to finance her studies. Her father had gone bankrupt and her mother was seriously ill with tuberculosis. She was not interested in a career as a painter based on the mimetic tradition that had formed the basis of her art training. She took a job in Chicago as a commercial artist and worked there until 1910, when she returned to Virginia to recuperate from the measles and later moved with her family to Charlottesville, Virginia. She did not paint for four years and said that the smell of turpentine made her ill. She began teaching art in 1911. One of her positions was at her former school, Chatham Episcopal Institute, in Virginia.

=== First abstractions ===
She took a summer art class in 1912 at the University of Virginia from Alon Bement, who was a Columbia University Teachers College faculty member. Under Bement, she learned of the innovative ideas of Arthur Wesley Dow, Bement's colleague. Dow's approach was influenced by principles of design and composition in Japanese art. She began to experiment with abstract compositions and develop a personal style that veered away from realism. From 1912 to 1914, she taught art in the public schools in Amarillo in the Texas Panhandle, and was a teaching assistant to Bement during the summers. She took classes at the University of Virginia for two more summers. She also took a class in the spring of 1914 at Teachers College of Columbia University with Dow, who further influenced her thinking about the process of making art. Her studies at the University of Virginia, based upon Dow's principles, were pivotal in O'Keeffe's development as an artist. Through her exploration and growth as an artist, she helped to establish the American modernism movement.

First abstractions

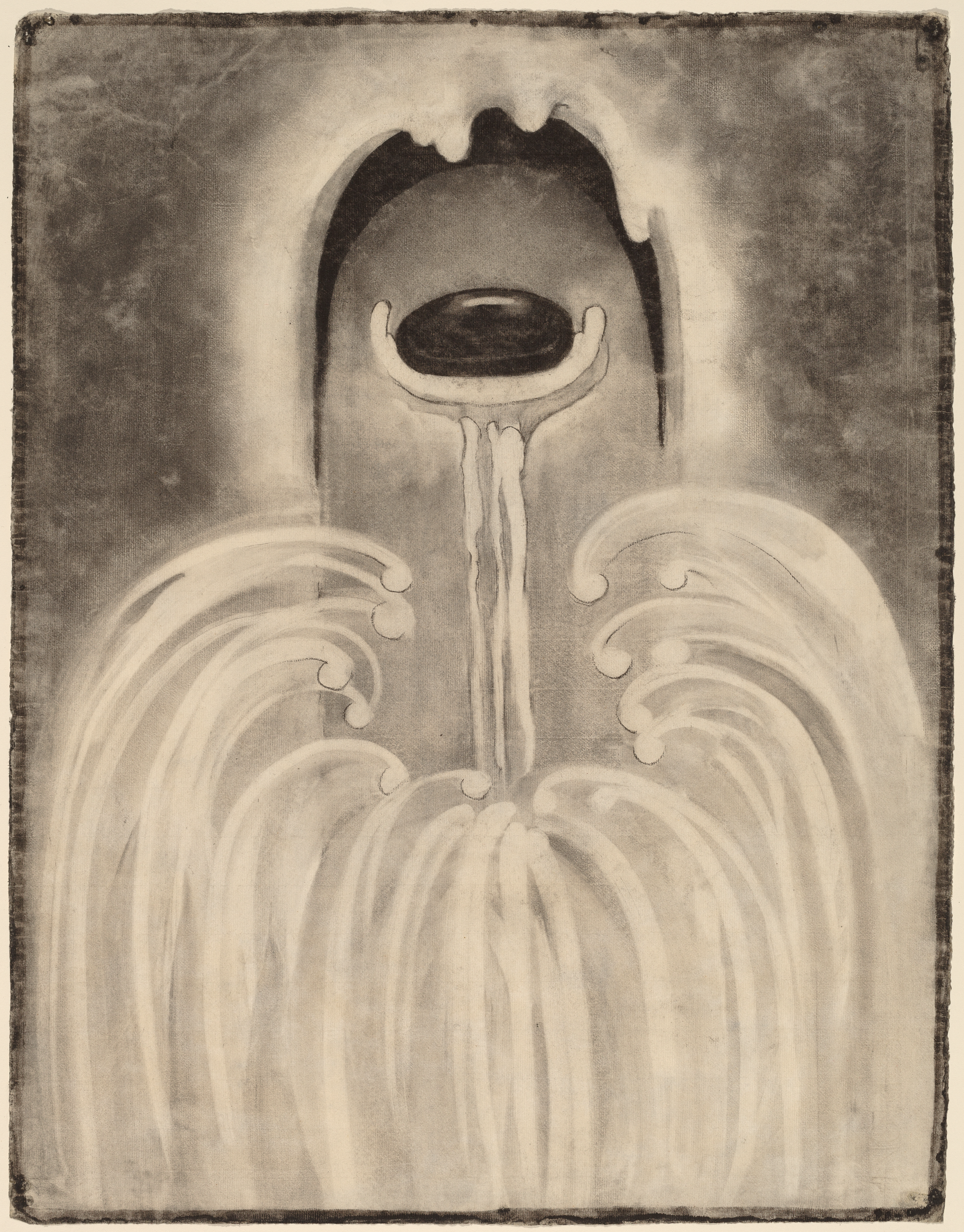
Special Drawing No. 2, 1915, charcoal on laid paper, National Gallery of Art

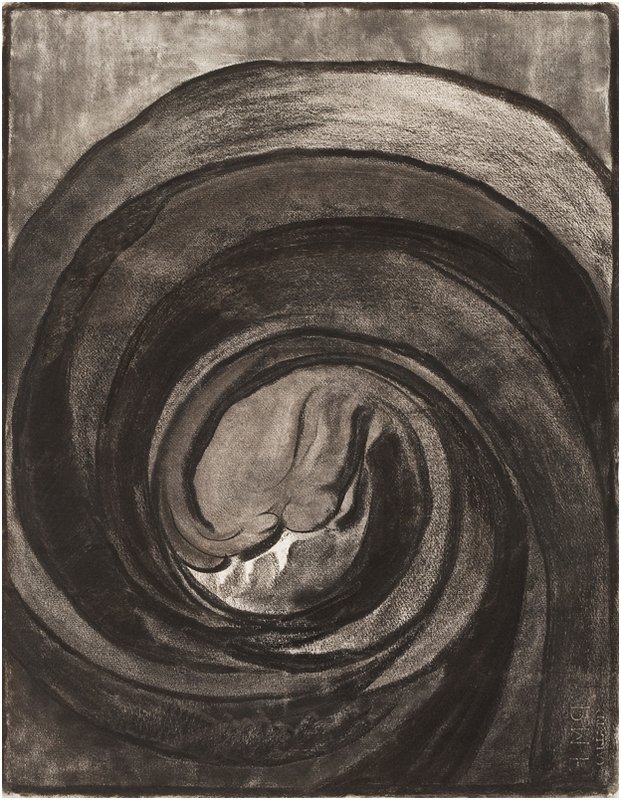
Special No. 8, 1916, charcoal on paper, Whitney Museum

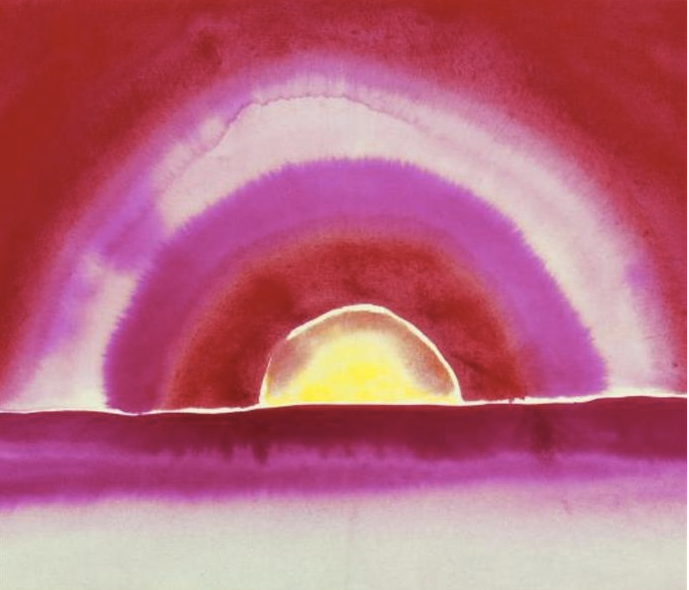
Sunrise, 1916, watercolor on paper

She taught at Columbia College in Columbia, South Carolina in late 1915, where she completed a series of highly innovative charcoal abstractions based on her personal sensations. In early 1916, O'Keeffe was in New York at Teachers College, Columbia University. She mailed the charcoal drawings to a friend and former classmate at Teachers College, Anita Pollitzer, who took them to Alfred Stieglitz at his 291 gallery early in 1916. Stieglitz found them to be the "purest, finest, sincerest things that had entered 291 in a long while" and said that he would like to show them. In April that year, Stieglitz exhibited ten of her drawings at 291.

After further course work at Columbia in early 1916 and summer teaching for Bement, she became the chair of the art department at West Texas State Normal College, in Canyon, Texas, beginning in the fall of 1916. O'Keeffe, who enjoyed sunrises and sunsets, developed a fondness for intense and nocturnal colors. Building upon a practice she began in South Carolina, O'Keeffe painted to express her most private sensations and feelings. Rather than sketching out a design before painting, she freely created designs. O'Keeffe continued to experiment until she believed she truly captured her feelings in the watercolor, Light Coming on the Plains No. I (1917).

Abstractions

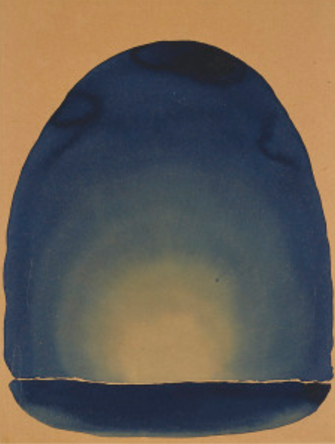
Light Coming on the Plains No. II, 1917, watercolor on newsprint paper, Amon Carter Museum of American Art

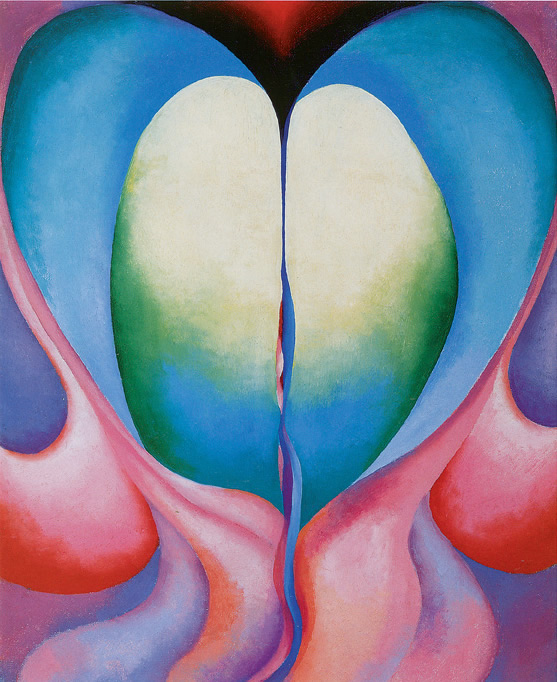
Series 1, No. 8, 1918, oil painting on canvas, Lenbachhaus, Munich

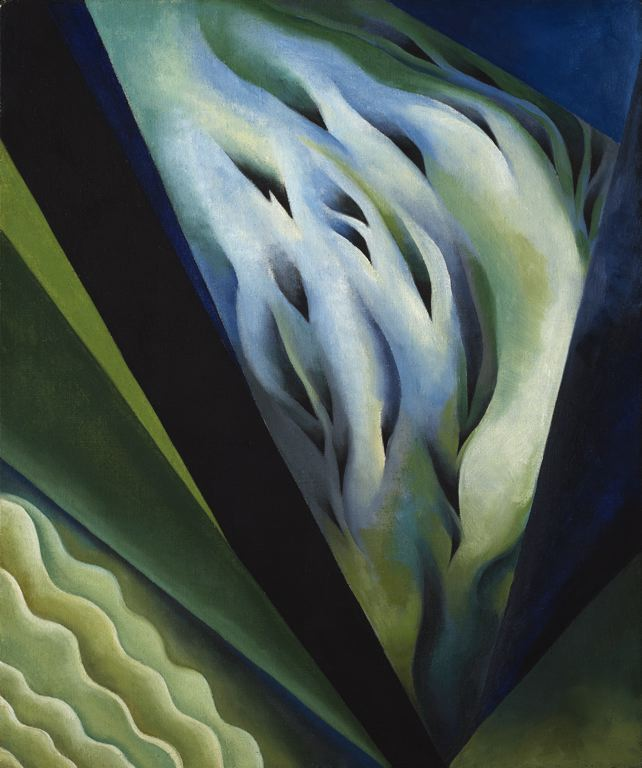
Blue and Green Music, 1921, oil on canvas, Art Institute of Chicago

She began a series of watercolor paintings based upon the scenery and expansive views during her walks, including vibrant paintings of Palo Duro Canyon. She "captured a monumental landscape in this simple configuration, fusing blue and green pigments in almost indistinct tonal gradations that simulate the pulsating effect of light on the horizon of the Texas Panhandle," according to author Sharyn Rohlfsen Udall.

Palo Duro Canyon

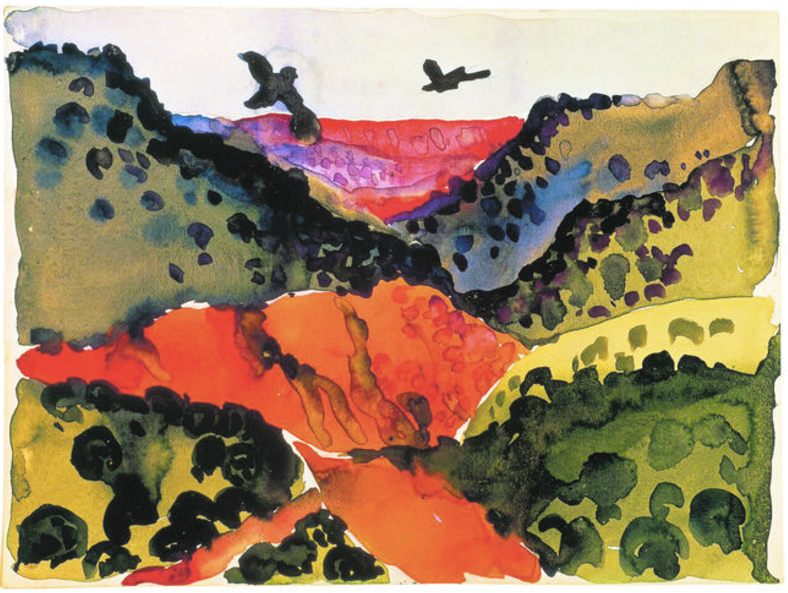
Canyon with Crows, 1917, watercolor and graphite on paper, Georgia O'Keeffe Museum

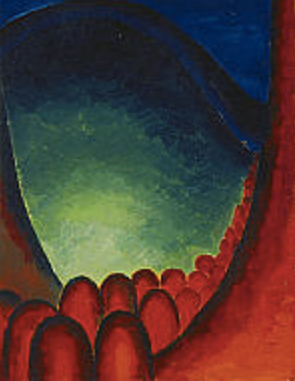
No. 20 Special, oil on board, 1916–1917, Milwaukee Art Museum

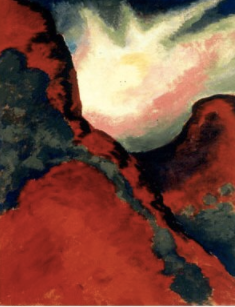
Palo Duro Canyon, 1916–1917, watercolor, West Texas A&M University

== New York (1918–1930s) ==
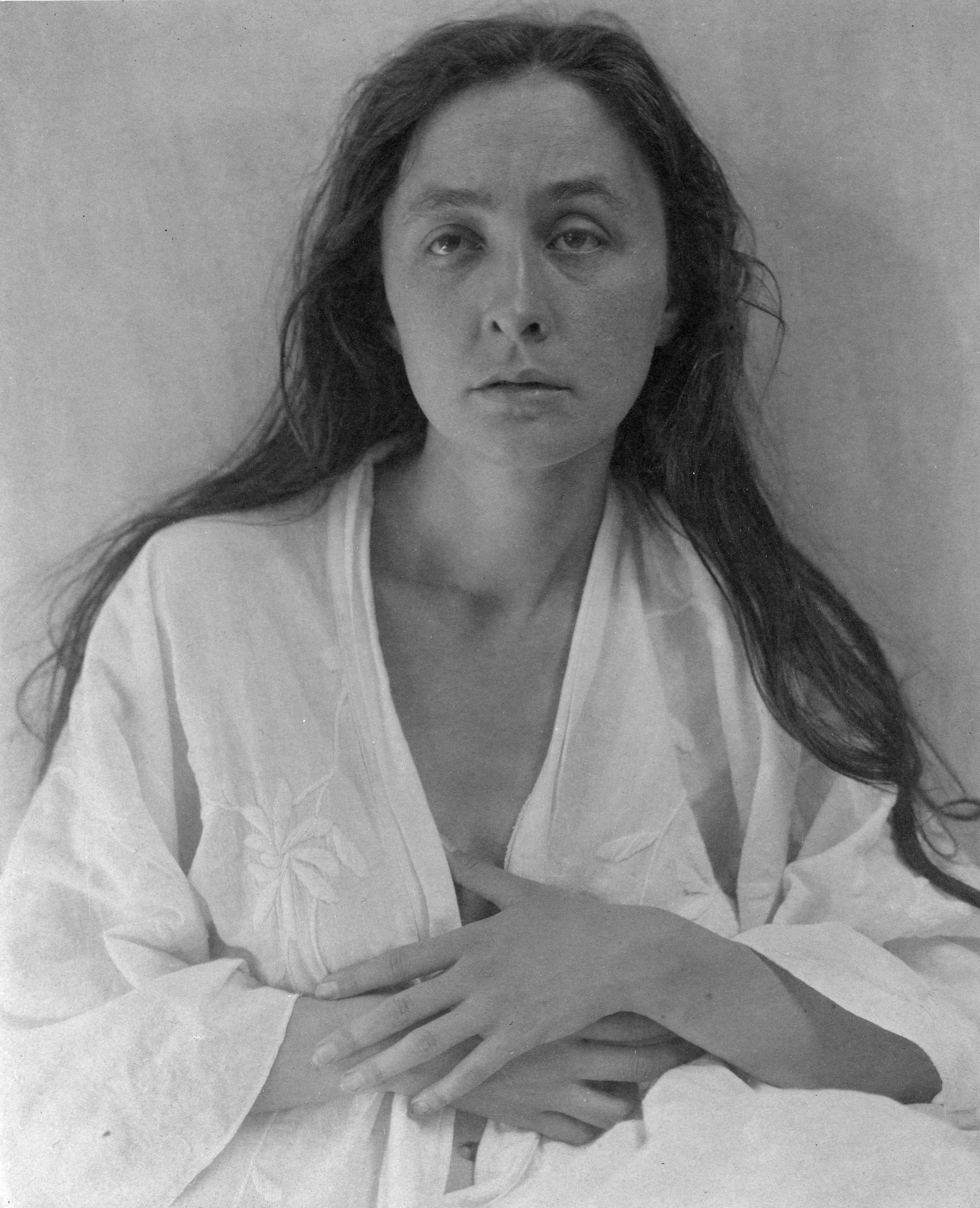
A Stieglitz portrait of Georgia O'Keeffe (1918)

=== Stieglitz circle ===
In 1918, O'Keeffe moved to New York as Stieglitz offered to provide financial support, a residence, and place for her to paint. They developed a close personal relationship, and later married, while he promoted her work. Stieglitz also discouraged her use of watercolor, which was associated with amateur women artists. According to art historian Charles Eldredge, "the couple enjoyed a prominent position in the ebullient art of New York throughout the 1920s".

O'Keeffe came to know the many early American modernists who were part of Stieglitz's circle of artists, including painters Charles Demuth, Arthur Dove, Marsden Hartley, John Marin, and photographers Paul Strand and Edward Steichen. Strand's photography, as well as that of Stieglitz, inspired O'Keeffe's work. Stieglitz, whose 291 Gallery closed down in 1917, was now able to spend more time on his own photographic practice, producing a series of photographs of natural forms, cloud studies (a series known as Equivalents), and portraits of O'Keeffe. Prior to her marriage to Stieglitz, O'Keeffe's drawings and paintings were frequently abstract, although she began to expand her visual vocabulary from 1924 onward to include more representational imagery "usually taken from nature and often painted in series".

=== Flower paintings ===
O'Keeffe began creating simplified images of natural things, such as leaves, flowers, and rocks. Inspired by Precisionism, The Green Apple, completed in 1922, depicts her notion of simple, meaningful life. O'Keeffe said that year, "it is only by selection, by elimination, and by emphasis that we get at the real meaning of things." Blue and Green Music expresses O'Keeffe's feelings about music through visual art, using bold and subtle colors.

Also in 1922, journalist Paul Rosenfeld commented "[the] Essence of very womanhood permeates her pictures", citing her use of color and shapes as metaphors for the female body. This same article also describes her paintings in a sexual manner. While her work is often interpreted to be about female sexuality, she rejected this idea numerous times. O'Keeffe, most famous for her depiction of flowers, made about 200 flower paintings, which by the mid-1920s were large-scale depictions of flowers, as if seen through a magnifying lens, such as Oriental Poppies and several Red Canna paintings. She painted her first large-scale flower painting, Petunia, No. 2, in 1924 and it was first exhibited in 1925. Making magnified depictions of objects created a sense of awe and emotional intensity. In 1924, Stieglitz arranged a show displaying O'Keeffe's works of art alongside his photographs at Anderson Galleries and helped to organize other exhibitions over the next several years.

Red Canna (1915–1923)

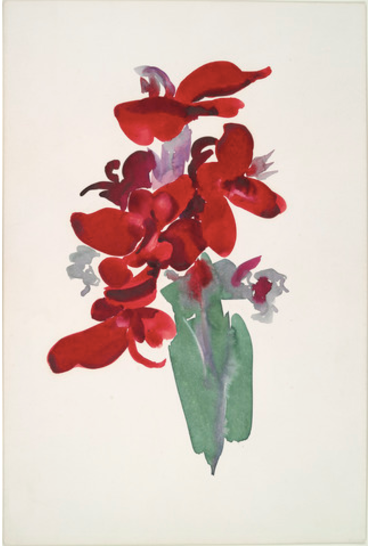
Red Canna, 1915, Yale University Art Gallery

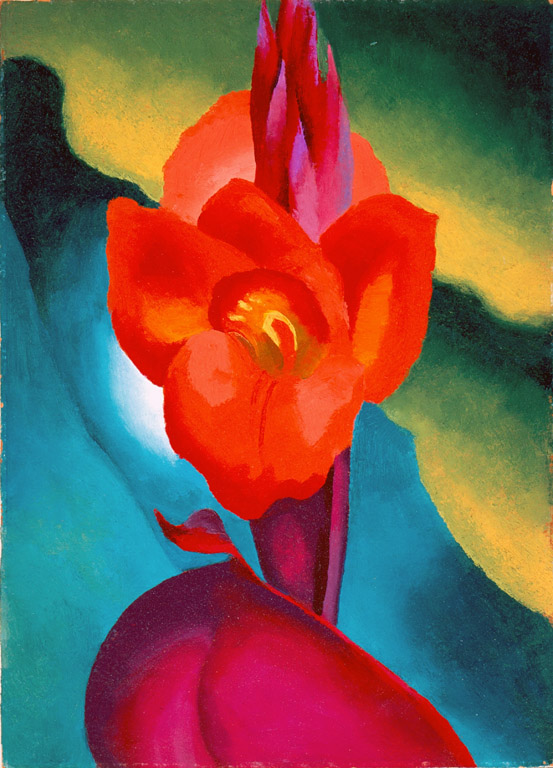
Red Canna, 1919, oil on board, High Museum of Art, Atlanta

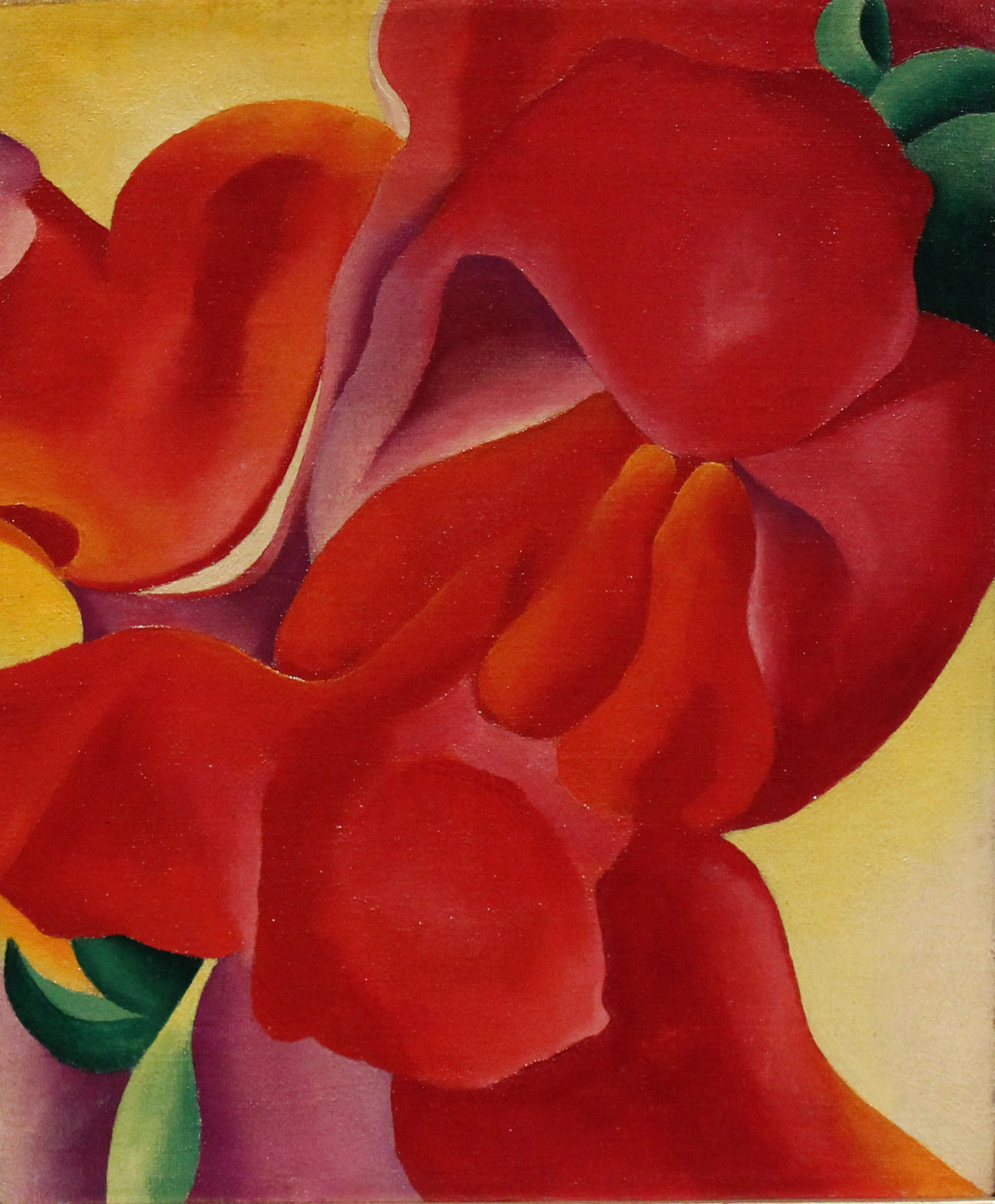
Red Canna, 1923, oil-painting on canvas, Pennsylvania Academy of the Fine Arts

=== New York Skyscraper paintings ===
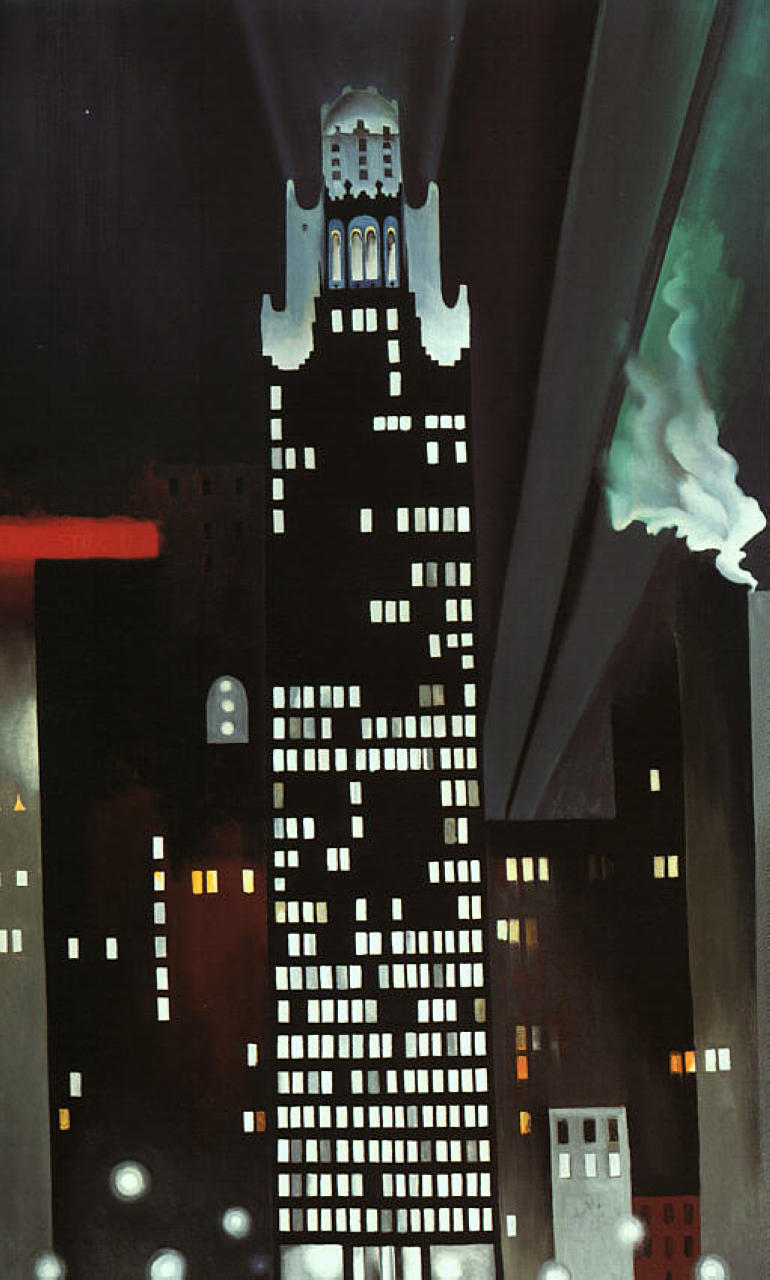
Radiator Building–Night, New York, 1927, oil on canvas, The Phillips Collection, Washington, D.C.

After having moved into a 30th floor apartment in the Shelton Hotel in 1925, O'Keeffe began a series of paintings of the New York skyscrapers and skyline. One of her most notable works, which demonstrates her skill at depicting the buildings in the Precisionist style, is the Radiator Building – Night, New York. Other examples are New York Street with Moon (1925), The Shelton with Sunspots, N.Y. (1926), and City Night (1926). She made a cityscape, East River from the Thirtieth Story of the Shelton Hotel in 1928, a painting of her view of the East River and smoke-emitting factories in Queens. The next year she made her final New York City skyline and skyscraper paintings and traveled to New Mexico, which became a source of inspiration for her work.

The Brooklyn Museum held a retrospective of her work in 1927. In 1928, Stieglitz announced that six of her calla lily paintings sold to an anonymous buyer in France for US$25,000, but there is no evidence that this transaction occurred the way Stieglitz reported. As a result of the press attention, O'Keeffe's paintings sold at a higher price from that point onward.

== New Mexico (1930s–1986) ==
By 1929, she traveled to Santa Fe for the first time, accompanied by her friend Rebecca (Beck) Strand and stayed in Taos with Mabel Dodge Luhan, who provided O'Keeffe and Strand with studios. From her room she had a clear view of the Taos Mountains as well as the morada (meetinghouse) of the Hermanos de la Fraternidad Piadosa de Nuestro Padre Jesús Nazareno, also known as the Penitentes. She subsequently visited New Mexico on a near-annual basis from 1929 onward, often staying there for several months at a time, returning to New York each winter to exhibit her work at Stieglitz's gallery. O'Keeffe went on many pack trips, exploring the rugged mountains and deserts of the region that summer and later visited the nearby D. H. Lawrence Ranch, where she completed her now famous oil painting, The Lawrence Tree, currently owned by the Wadsworth Athenaeum in Hartford, Connecticut. O'Keeffe visited and painted the nearby historical San Francisco de Asís Mission Church at Ranchos de Taos. She made several paintings of the church, as had many artists, and her painting of a fragment of it silhouetted against the sky captured it from a unique perspective.

In New Mexico, she collected rocks and bones from the desert floor and made them and the distinctive architectural and landscape forms of the area subjects in her work. Known as a loner, O'Keeffe often explored the land she loved in her Ford Model A, which she purchased and learned to drive in 1929. She often talked about her fondness for Ghost Ranch and northern New Mexico, as in 1943, when she explained, "Such a beautiful, untouched lonely feeling place, such a fine part of what I call the 'Faraway'. It is a place I have painted before ... even now I must do it again." O'Keeffe did not work from late 1932 until about the mid-1930s due to nervous breakdowns. She was a popular artist, receiving commissions while her works were being exhibited in New York and other places.

=== Skull and desert motifs ===
In 1933 and 1934, O'Keeffe recuperated in Bermuda and returned to New Mexico. In August 1934, she moved to Ghost Ranch, north of Abiquiú. In 1940, she moved into a house on the ranch property. The varicolored cliffs surrounding the ranch inspired some of her most famous landscapes. Between 1934 and 1936, she completed a series of landscape paintings inspired by the New Mexico desert, often with prominent depictions of animal skulls, including Ram's Head, White Hollyhock-Hills (1935) and Deer's Head with Pedernal (1936). In 1936 she completed what would become one of her best-known paintings, Summer Days. Like Ram's Head with Hollyhock, it depicts desert scenery with a skull and vibrant wildflowers.

Skulls and desert motif

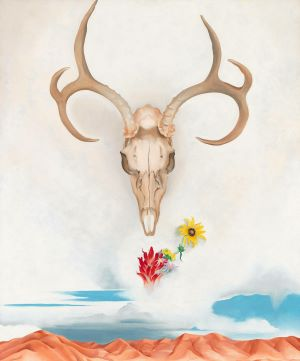
Summer Days, 1936, oil on canvas, Whitney Museum of American Art

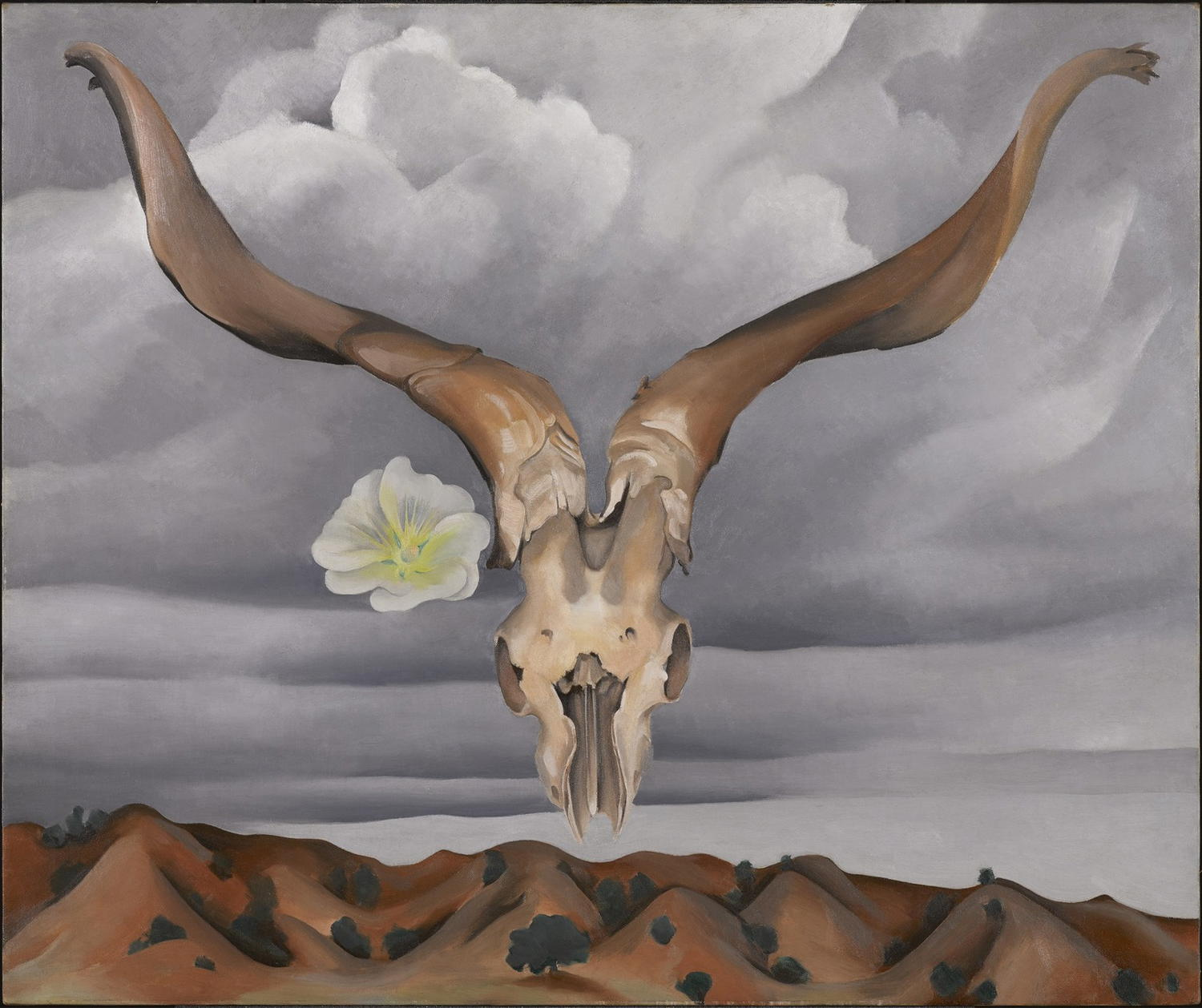
Ram's Head, White Hollyhock-Hills, 1935, oil on canvas, Brooklyn Museum

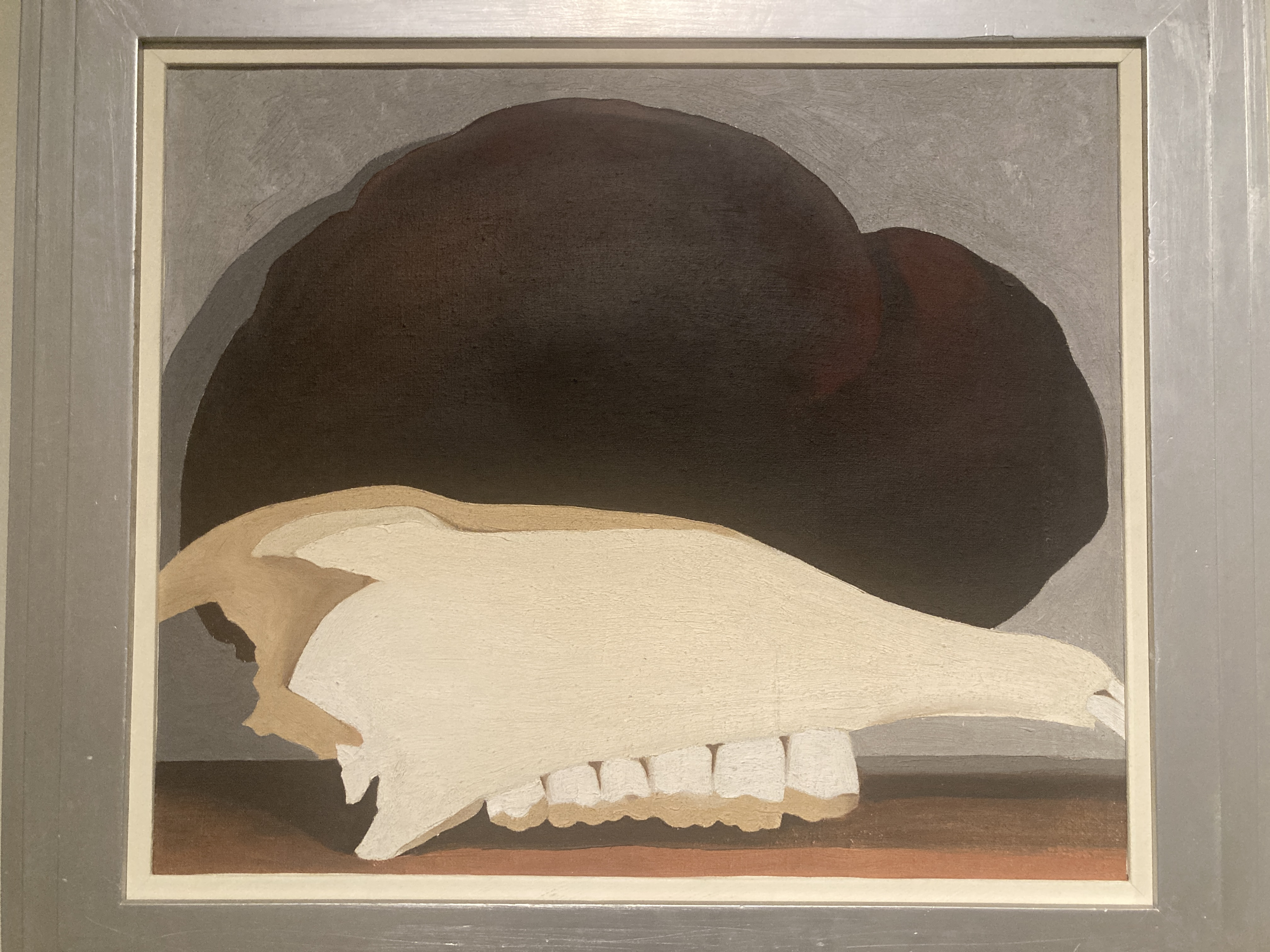
Jawbone and Fungus, 1931, oil on canvas, Memorial Art Gallery

=== Hawaii series ===
In 1938, the advertising agency N. W. Ayer & Son approached O'Keeffe about creating two paintings for the Hawaiian Pineapple Company (now Dole Food Company) to use in advertising. Other artists who produced paintings of Hawaii for the Hawaiian Pineapple Company's advertising include Lloyd Sexton Jr., Millard Sheets, Yasuo Kuniyoshi, Isamu Noguchi, and Miguel Covarrubias. The offer came at a critical time in O'Keeffe's life: she was 51, and her career seemed to be stalling (critics were calling her focus on New Mexico limited, and branding her desert images "a kind of mass production").

She arrived in Honolulu on February 8, 1939, aboard the SS Lurline and spent nine weeks in Oahu, Maui, Kauai, and the island of Hawaii. By far the most productive and vivid period was on Maui, where she was given complete freedom to explore and paint. She painted flowers, landscapes, and traditional Hawaiian fishhooks. O'Keeffe completed a series of 20 sensual, verdant paintings based on her trip to Hawaii; however, she did not paint the requested pineapple until the Hawaiian Pineapple Company sent a plant to her New York studio.

=== Abiquiú and landscapes ===
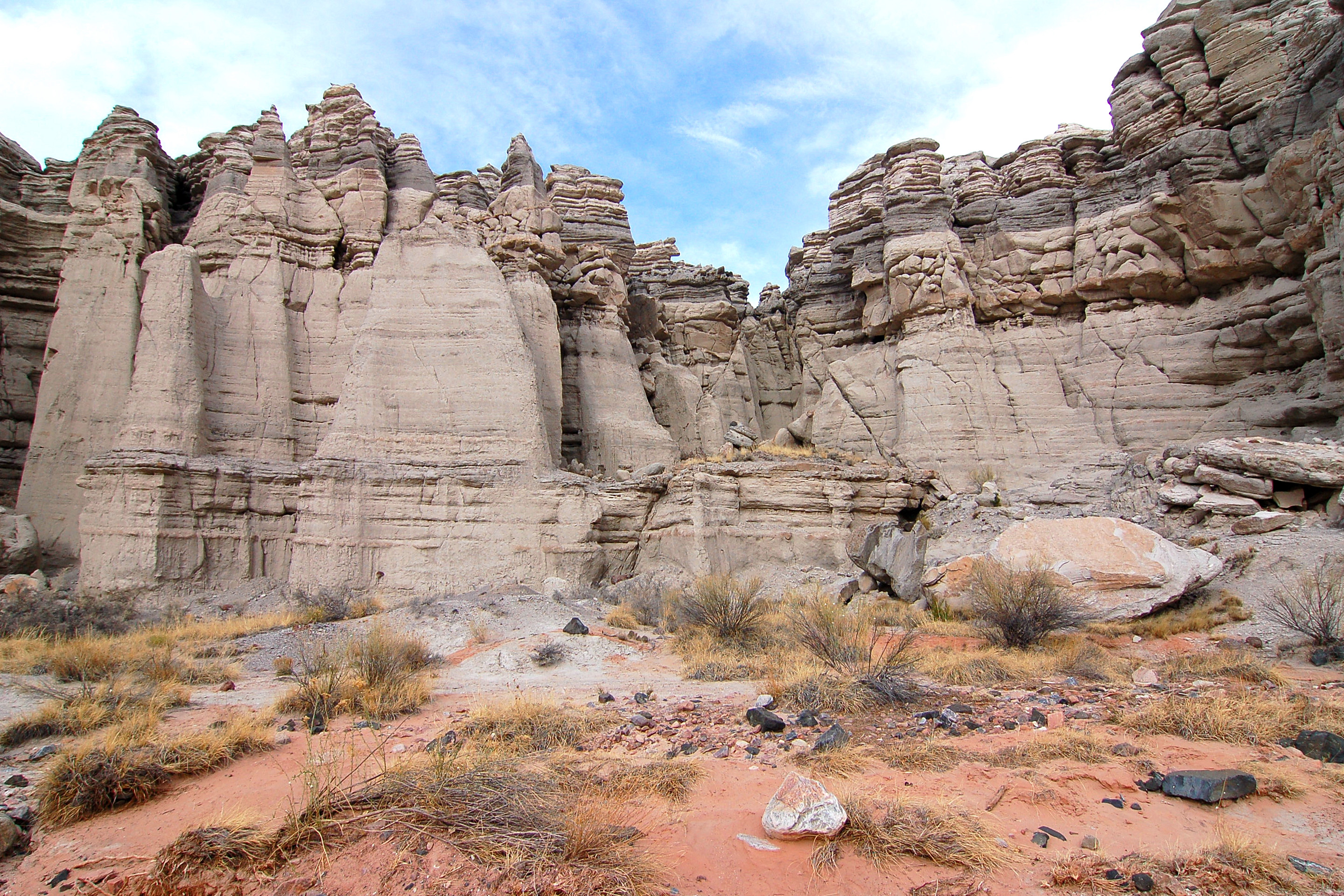
Photo of the Plaza Blanca cliffs and badlands near Abiquiú, O'Keeffe's "White Place"

In 1945, O'Keeffe bought a second house, an abandoned hacienda in Abiquiú, which she renovated into a home and studio. She moved permanently to New Mexico in 1949, spending time at both Ghost Ranch and the Abiquiú house that she made into her studio.

Todd Webb, a photographer she met in the 1940s, moved to New Mexico in 1961. He often made photographs of her, as did numerous other important American photographers, who consistently presented O'Keeffe as a "loner, a severe figure and self-made person." While O'Keeffe was known to have a "prickly personality," Webb's photographs portray her with a kind of "quietness and calm" suggesting a relaxed friendship, and revealing new contours of O'Keeffe's character.

In the 1940s, O'Keeffe made an extensive series of paintings of what is called the "Black Place", about 150 miles (240 km) west of her Ghost Ranch house. O'Keeffe said that the Black Place resembled "a mile of elephants with gray hills and white sand at their feet." She made paintings of the "White Place", a white rock formation located near her Abiquiú house. In 1946, she began making the architectural forms of her Abiquiú house—the patio wall and door—subjects in her work. It was in this period that O'Keeffe also worked seriously with photography, providing striking counterparts to her patio and door paintings. Another distinctive painting was Ladder to the Moon, 1958. In the mid-1960s, O'Keeffe produced Sky Above Clouds, a series of cloudscapes inspired by her views from airplane windows. (Note: The series is capitalized as Sky Above Clouds but the singular work at The Art Institute of Chicago is stylized as "Sky above Clouds".) Worcester Art Museum held a retrospective of her work in 1960 and 10 years later, the Whitney Museum of American Art mounted the Georgia O'Keeffe Retrospective Exhibition.

Beginning in 1946, O'Keeffe worked with the painting conservator Caroline Keck to preserve the visual impression of her paintings. O'Keeffe's stated preference was for her works to be free of dirt, even if removing such soiling caused abrasion to her colors. Keck encouraged O'Keeffe to begin applying acrylic varnishes to her works in order to facilitate their cleaning.

During the 1940s, O'Keeffe had two one-woman retrospectives, the first at the Art Institute of Chicago (1943). Her second was in 1946, when she was the first woman artist to have a retrospective at the Museum of Modern Art (MoMA) in Manhattan. The Whitney Museum began an effort to create the first catalogue of her work in the mid-1940s.

=== Late career and death ===
External images
- Sky above Clouds IV, 1965, oil on canvas, The Art Institute of Chicago.
- , 1939, oil on canvas, Honolulu Museum of Art.

By 1972, O'Keeffe had lost much of her eyesight due to macular degeneration, leaving her with only peripheral vision. She stopped oil painting without assistance in 1972. In 1973, O'Keeffe hired John Bruce "Juan" Hamilton as a live-in assistant and then a caretaker. Hamilton was a potter. Hamilton taught O'Keeffe to work with clay, encouraged her to resume painting despite her deteriorating eyesight, and helped her write her autobiography. He worked for her for 13 years. The artist's autobiography, Georgia O'Keeffe, published in 1976 by Viking Press, featured Summer Days (1936) on the cover. It became a bestseller. During the 1970s, she made a series of works in watercolor. She continued working in pencil and charcoal until 1984.

O'Keeffe became increasingly frail in her late nineties. She moved to Santa Fe in 1984, where she died on March 6, 1986, at the age of 98. Her body was cremated and her ashes were scattered, as she wished, on the land around Ghost Ranch. Following O'Keeffe's death, her family contested her will because codicils added to it in the 1980s had left most of her $65 million estate to Hamilton. The case was ultimately settled out of court in July 1987. The case became a famous precedent in estate planning.

== Reception ==
=== Awards and honors ===
External videos
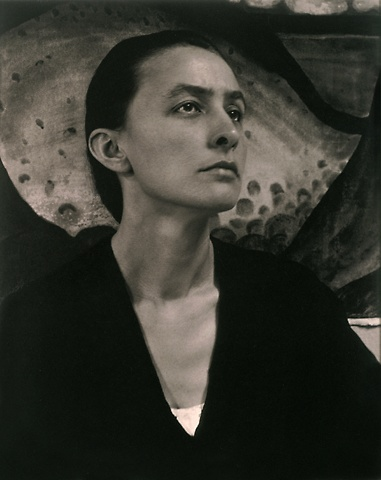
- Life and Artwork of Georgia O'Keeffe, the Georgia O'Keeffe Museum (11:00), C-SPAN

In 1938, O'Keeffe received an honorary degree of "Doctor of Fine Arts" from the College of William & Mary. Later, O'Keeffe was elected to the American Academy of Arts and Letters and in 1966 was elected a Fellow of the American Academy of Arts and Sciences. Among her awards and honors, O'Keeffe received the M. Carey Thomas Award at Bryn Mawr College in 1971 and two years later received an honorary degree from Harvard University.

In 1977, President Gerald Ford presented O'Keeffe with the Presidential Medal of Freedom, the highest honor awarded to American civilians. In 1985, she was awarded the National Medal of Arts by President Ronald Reagan. In 1993, she was inducted into the National Women's Hall of Fame.

O'Keeffe also had a major role in shaping modern visual art. This was through her being abstract, using natural forms, and doing large-scale artworks, which had a challenging feature towards what was traditional.

=== Art criticism and scholarship ===
O'Keeffe's lotus paintings may have deeper ties to vulvar imagery and symbolism. Feminist art historian Linda Nochlin, the author of the influential 1971 essay titled "Why Have There Been No Great Women Artists?", also interpreted Black Iris III (1926) as a morphological metaphor for a vulva.

Art dealer Samuel Kootz was one of O'Keeffe's critics who, although considering her to be "the only prominent woman artist" (in the words of Marilyn Hall Mitchell), considered sexual expression in her work (and other artists' work) artistically problematic. Kootz stated that "assertion of sex can only impede the talents of an artist, for it is an act of defiance, of grievance, in which the consciousness of these qualities retards the natural assertions of the painter".

O'Keeffe stood her ground against sexual interpretations of her work, and for fifty years maintained that there was no connection between vulvas and her artwork. Firing back against some of the criticism, O'Keeffe stated, "When people read erotic symbols into my paintings, they're really talking about their own affairs." She attributed other artists' attacks on her work to psychological projection. O'Keeffe was also seen as a revolutionary feminist; however, the artist rejected these notions, stating that "femaleness is irrelevant" and that "it has nothing to do with art making or accomplishment."

== Personal life ==
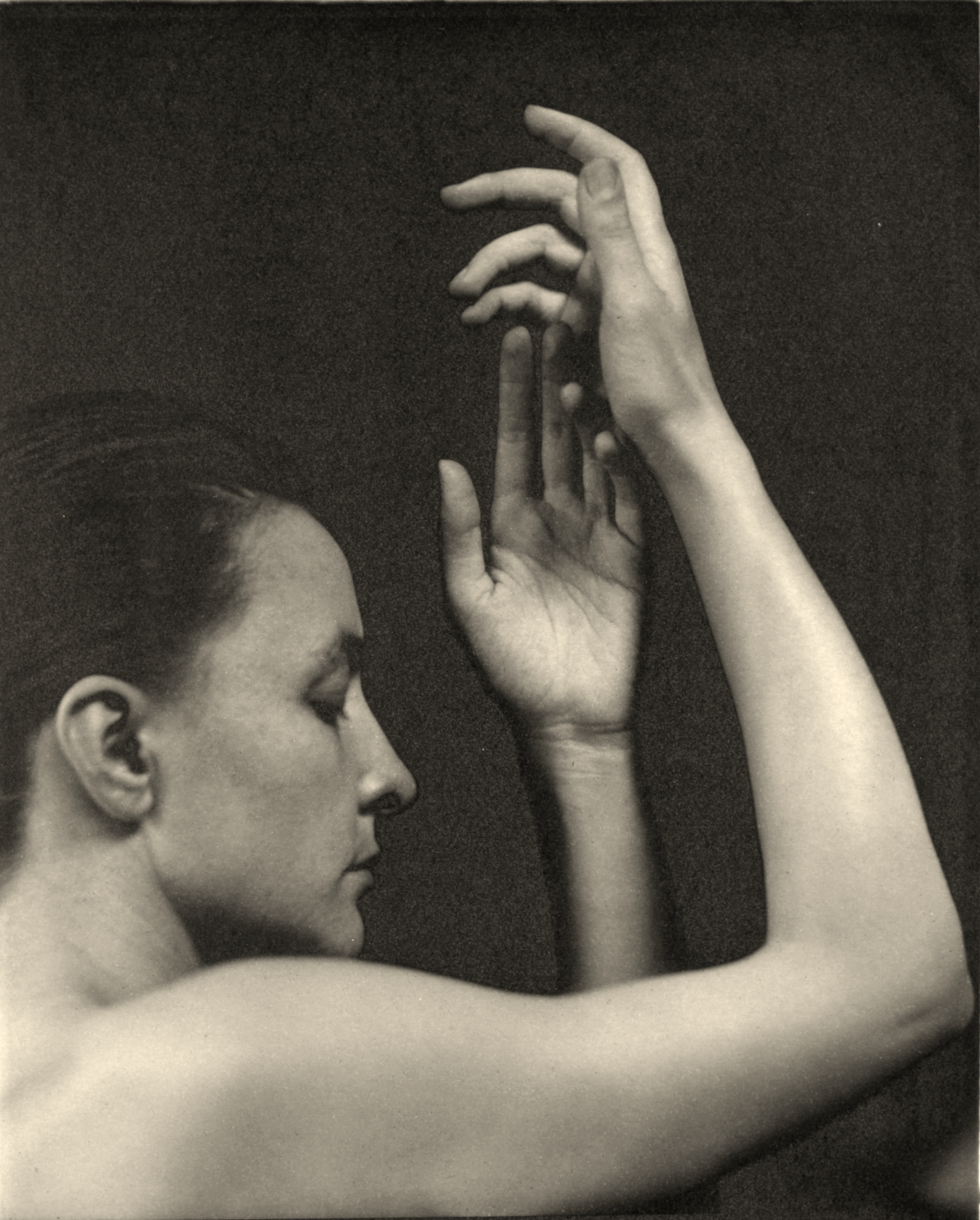
Alfred Stieglitz, Georgia O'Keeffe, platinum print, 1920

In June 1918, O'Keeffe accepted Stieglitz's invitation to move to New York from Texas after he promised to provide her a quiet studio where she could paint. Within a month he took the first of many nude photographs of her at his family's apartment while his wife was away. His wife returned home while their session was still in progress and gave him an ultimatum. Stieglitz left immediately and moved into an apartment in the city with O'Keeffe. In mid-August when they visited Oaklawn, the Stieglitz family summer estate in Lake George in upstate New York, they behaved like "two teenagers in love." Also around this time, O'Keeffe became sick during the 1918 flu pandemic.

In February 1921, Stieglitz's photographs of O'Keeffe were included in a retrospective exhibition at the Anderson Galleries. Stieglitz started photographing O'Keeffe when she visited him in New York City to see her 1917 exhibition, and continued taking photographs, many of which were in the nude. It created a public sensation. When he retired from photography in 1937, he had made more than 350 portraits and more than 200 nude photos of her. In 1978, she wrote about how distant from them she had become, "When I look over the photographs Stieglitz took of me—some of them more than sixty years ago—I wonder who that person is. It is as if in my one life I have lived many lives."

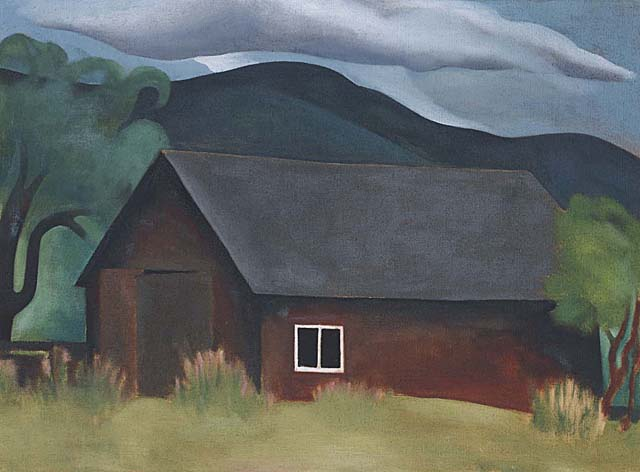
My Shanty, Lake George, 1922, oil on canvas, The Phillips Collection, Washington, D.C.

Owing to the legal delays caused by Stieglitz's first wife and her family, it would take six years before he obtained a divorce. O'Keeffe and Stieglitz were married on December 11, 1924. For the rest of their lives together, their relationship was, "a collusion....a system of deals and trade-offs, tacitly agreed to and carried out, for the most part, without the exchange of a word. Preferring avoidance to confrontation on most issues, O'Keeffe was the principal agent of collusion in their union," according to biographer Benita Eisler. They lived primarily in New York City, but spent their summers at his father's family estate, Oaklawn, in Lake George in upstate New York.

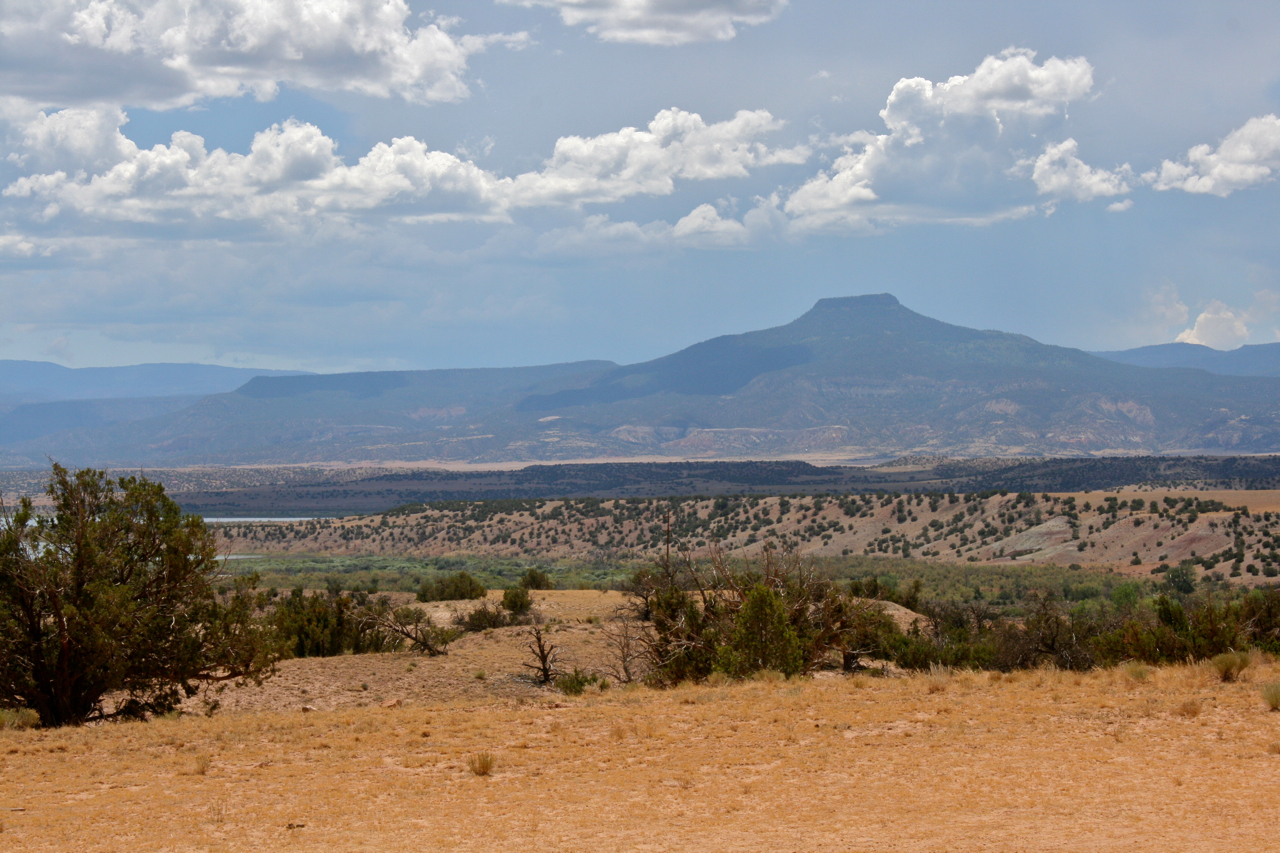
Cerro Pedernal, viewed from Ghost Ranch. This was a favorite subject for O'Keeffe, who once said, "It's my private mountain. It belongs to me. God told me if I painted it enough, I could have it"

O'Keeffe and Stieglitz had an open relationship, which could be painful for O'Keeffe when Stieglitz had affairs with women. (Note: She also said that she was happy being "me" rather than worrying about affairs that Stieglitz might be having.) In 1928, Stieglitz began a long-term affair with Dorothy Norman, who was also married, and O'Keeffe lost a project to create a mural for Radio City Music Hall. She was hospitalized for depression. At the suggestion of Maria Chabot and Mabel Dodge Luhan, O'Keeffe began to spend the summers painting in New Mexico in 1929. She traveled by train with her friend the painter Rebecca Strand, Paul Strand's wife, to Taos, where they lived with their patron who provided them with studios. In 1933, O'Keeffe was hospitalized for two months after suffering a nervous breakdown, largely due to Stieglitz's affair with Dorothy Norman. She did not paint again until January 1934.

O'Keeffe continued to visit New Mexico, without her husband, and created a new body of works based upon the desert. (Note: In the 1920s and 1930s, Santa Fe and Taos were havens for men and women who wanted to live unburdened by societal norms about sexuality. During that time, "artists flocked to New Mexico inspired by its vast natural beauty and the indigenous cultures that were so different from their own." Lesbian women in the fields of photography, archaeology, and anthropology were drawn to the area professionally and personally. O'Keeffe knew lesbian and bisexual women According to El Palacio, she tended to avoid Santa Fe's lesbian women. She was friends with bisexual and gay men, like Cady Wells, who was a lifelong friend.) O'Keeffe broke free of "strict gender roles" and adopted "gender neutral" clothing, as did other professional women in Santa Fe and Taos who experienced "psychological space and sexual freedom" there. (Note: O'Keeffe preferred to focus on her artistic skills than her sexual orientation. She did not claim to be bisexual, and there are differing opinions about her sexuality. Benita Eisler, author of O'Keeffe & Stieglitz: An American Romance, was the first biographer to state that O'Keeffe was a bisexual. She came to that conclusion from reading letters between Beck and Paul Strand. Colin B. Bailey, Director of Museums, Fine Arts Museums of San Francisco stated that people who wrote that O'Keeffe was bisexual brought the topic into "murky historical waters".)

Shortly after O'Keeffe arrived for the summer in New Mexico in 1946, Stieglitz suffered a cerebral thrombosis (stroke). She immediately flew to New York to be with him. He died on July 13, 1946. She buried his ashes at Lake George. She spent the next three years mostly in New York settling his estate.

She had a close relationship with Beck Strand. They enjoyed spending time together, traveling, and living with "glee". Strand said that she was most herself when with O'Keeffe. In Foursome—a book about O'Keeffe, Stieglitz, and Beck and Paul Strand—Carolyn Burke argues against the notion that the women were sexually or romantically involved, finding such a reading of their correspondence incongruous with their "passionate ties to their husbands" and "strong heterosexual attractions".

Frida Kahlo met O'Keeffe in December 1931 in New York City at the opening of Diego Rivera's solo exhibition at the MOMA, after which a friendship developed. (Note: In 1932, Frida Kahlo and her husband moved from NYC to Detroit. Here, Kahlo painted the famous Self Portrait on the Borderline Between Mexico and the United States. Many historians have noted the jack-in-the-pulpit flowers which lie on the Mexico side of the painting. These flowers, which are not native to Mexico, were the feature of a series of paintings by O'Keeffe just two years prior in which she painted the flowers at different periods of growth: one fully closed, one open, etc. This same series of growth is featured in Kahlo's painting.) They remained friends, staying in touch when O'Keeffe recuperated from a nervous breakdown in a hospital and then in Bermuda. Both women visited each other's homes on a couple of occasions in the 1950s.

Among guests to visit her at the ranch over the years were Charles and Anne Lindbergh, singer-songwriter Joni Mitchell, poet Allen Ginsberg, and photographer Ansel Adams. She traveled and camped at "Black Place" often with her friend, Maria Chabot, and later with Eliot Porter.

Later in life O'Keeffe developed macular degeneration, impairing her vision. She sometimes required assistance when painting.

== Legacy ==
In 1993 Marquette Middle School in Madison, Wisconsin was renamed as Georgia O'Keeffe Middle School.

In 2024, the documentary Georgia O'Keeffe: The Brightness of Light was released; it "traces the life and legacy of Georgia O’Keeffe, from her early years and rise in New York’s vibrant art world to her later life in the New Mexican desert."

=== Georgia O'Keeffe Museum ===
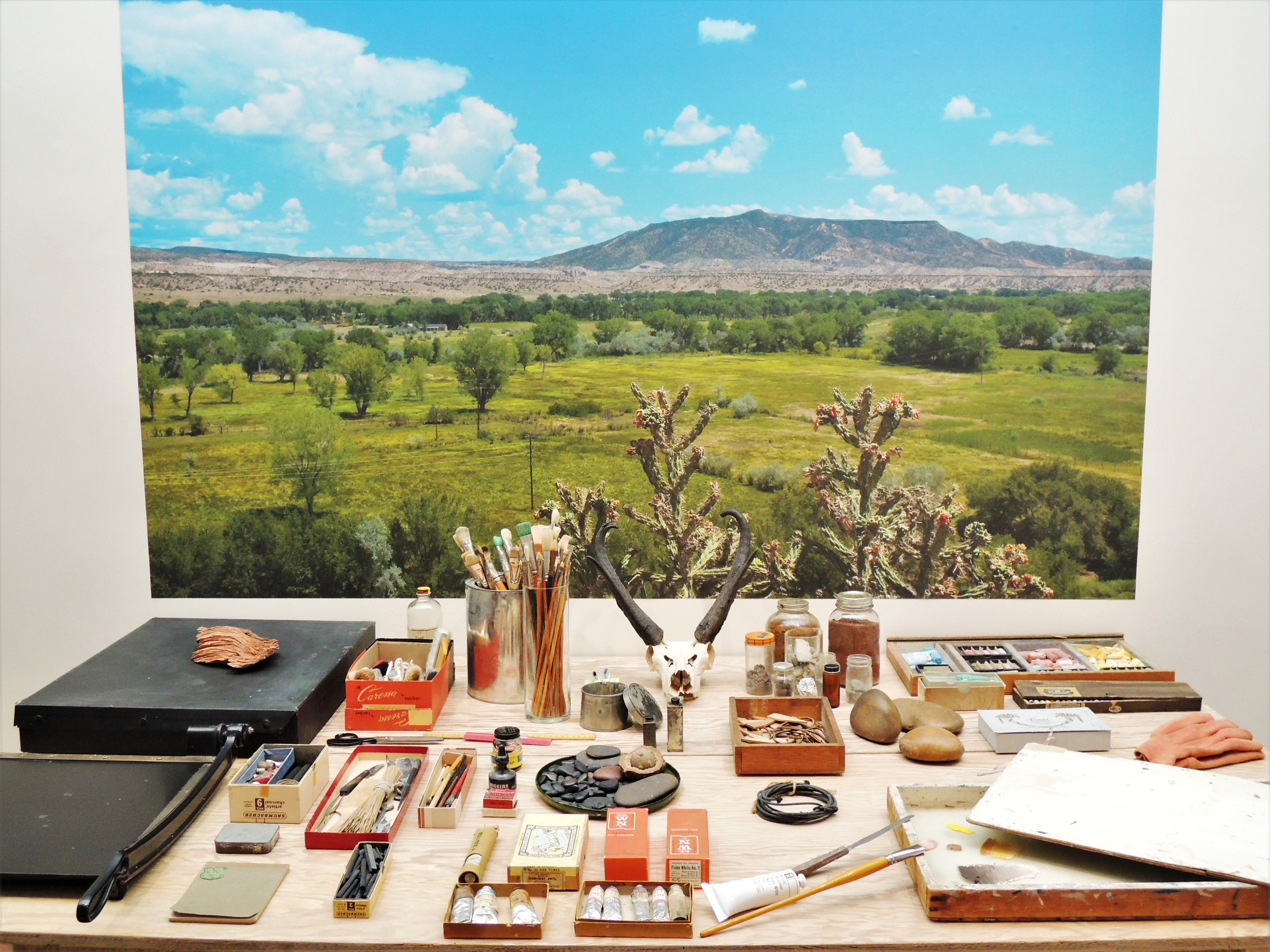
Painting materials as displayed at the Georgia O'Keeffe Museum in Santa Fe, New Mexico

O'Keeffe was a legend beginning in the 1920s, known as much for her independent spirit and female role model as for her dramatic and innovative works of art. Nancy and Jules Heller said, "The most remarkable thing about O'Keeffe was the audacity and uniqueness of her early work." At that time, even in Europe, there were few artists exploring abstraction. Even though her works may show elements of different modernist movements, such as Surrealism and Precisionism, her work is uniquely her own style.

A substantial part of her estate's assets were transferred to the Georgia O'Keeffe Foundation, a nonprofit. The Georgia O'Keeffe Museum opened in Santa Fe in 1997. The assets included a large body of her work, photographs, archival materials, and her Abiquiú house, library, and property. The Georgia O'Keeffe Home and Studio in Abiquiú was designated a National Historic Landmark in 1998, and is now owned by the Georgia O'Keeffe Museum. A fossilized species of archosaur was named Effigia okeeffeae ("O'Keeffe's Ghost") in January 2006, "in honor of Georgia O'Keeffe for her numerous paintings of the badlands at Ghost Ranch and her interest in the Coelophysis Quarry when it was discovered". In November 2016, the Georgia O'Keeffe Museum recognized the importance of her time in Charlottesville by dedicating an exhibition, using watercolors that she had created over three summers. It was entitled, O'Keeffe at the University of Virginia, 1912–1914.

The museum's 2026 exhibition "Tewa Nangeh/Tewa Country" examined O'Keeffe's representation of the New Mexico landscape and her views on the Tewa relationship to their ancestral land.

=== Popular culture ===
In 1991, PBS aired the American Playhouse production A Marriage: Georgia O'Keeffe and Alfred Stieglitz, starring Jane Alexander as O'Keeffe and Christopher Plummer as Alfred Stieglitz. In 1996, the U.S. Postal Service issued a 32-cent stamp honoring O'Keeffe. The following year Australian playwright Jill Shearer wrote the award-winning Georgia. In 2013, on the 100th anniversary of the Armory Show, the USPS issued a stamp featuring O'Keeffe's Black Mesa Landscape, New Mexico/Out Back of Marie's II, 1930 as part of their Modern Art in America series. Lifetime Television produced a biopic of Georgia O'Keeffe starring Joan Allen as O'Keeffe, Jeremy Irons as Alfred Stieglitz, Henry Simmons as Jean Toomer, Ed Begley Jr. as Stieglitz's brother Lee, and Tyne Daly as Mabel Dodge Luhan. It premiered on September 19, 2009.

On November 20, 2014, O'Keeffe's Jimson Weed/White Flower No 1 (1932) sold for $44,405,000 in 2014 at auction to Walmart heiress Alice Walton, more than three times the previous world auction record for any female artist.

=== Women's suffrage and feminism ===
In Equal Under the Sky: Georgia O'Keeffe and Twentieth Century Feminism, Linda M. Grasso documents O'Keeffe's life-long involvement in feminism and women's issues. O'Keeffe came of age as a woman and an artist in the 1910s, at the height of the women's suffrage movement and the intense artistic ferment of modernism. Grasso notes that "Modernists championed rupture, innovation, and daring in art forms, styles, and perspectives," and that O'Keeffe "first created herself as an artist when feminism and modernism were interlinked". As early as 1915, O'Keeffe was reading books and articles on women's suffrage and cultural politics with enthusiasm, such as Floyd Dell's Women as World Builders: Studies in Modern Feminism. There was much talk in this era about the "New Woman", liberated from Victorian strictures and mores and pursuing her own life and education and self-expression freely. O'Keeffe was in active dialogue with her suffragist friend Anita Pollitzer, with whom she exchanged letters on the subject. Pollitzer, in fact, was the first person to introduce Alfred Stieglitz to O'Keeffe's art work. She was also reading Charlotte Perkins Gilman and Olive Schreiner, among others, alongside the radical magazine The Masses, and lecturing on modernist dancer Isadora Duncan. In a debate with Michael Gold in 1930, O'Keeffe said she was "interested in the oppression of women of all classes". Gross writes: "She sustained an affiliation with the National Woman's Party and made public statements about gender discrimination and women's rights in interviews, speeches, letters, and articles into the 1970s."

She received unprecedented acceptance as a woman artist from the fine art world due to her powerful graphic images and within a decade of moving to New York City, she was the highest-paid American woman artist. She was known for a distinctive style in all aspects of her life.

Mary Beth Edelson's Some Living American Women Artists / Last Supper (1972) appropriated Leonardo da Vinci's The Last Supper, with the heads of notable women artists collaged over the heads of Christ and his apostles. John the Apostle's head was replaced with Nancy Graves, and Christ's with Georgia O'Keeffe. This image, addressing the role of religious and art historical iconography in the subordination of women, became "one of the most iconic images of the feminist art movement." Judy Chicago gave O'Keeffe a prominent place in her The Dinner Party (1979) in recognition of what many prominent feminist artists considered groundbreaking introduction of sensual and feminist imagery in her works of art. Although feminists celebrated O'Keeffe as the originator of "female iconography", she did not consider herself a feminist. She disliked being called a "woman artist" and wanted to be considered an "artist."

== Publications ==
- O'Keeffe, Georgia (1976). Georgia O'Keeffe. New York: Viking Press. ISBN 978-0-670-33710-1.
- O'Keeffe, Georgia (1988). Some Memories of Drawings. Albuquerque, NM: University of New Mexico Press. ISBN 978-0-8263-1113-9.
- O'Keeffe, Georgia (1993). Georgia O'Keeffe: American and Modern. New Haven: Yale University. ISBN 978-0-300-05581-8.

From her correspondence

- Giboire, Clive, ed. (1990). Lovingly, Georgia: The Complete Correspondence of Georgia O'Keeffe & Anita Pollitzer. New York: Simon & Schuster. ISBN 978-0-671-69236-0.
- Greenough, Sarah, ed. (2011). My Faraway One: Selected Letters of Georgia O'Keeffe and Alfred Stieglitz. Vol. One, 1915–1933 (Annotated ed.). New Haven, CT: Yale University Press. ISBN 978-0-300-16630-9.
