= My Shanty, Lake George =

Painting by Georgia O'Keeffe

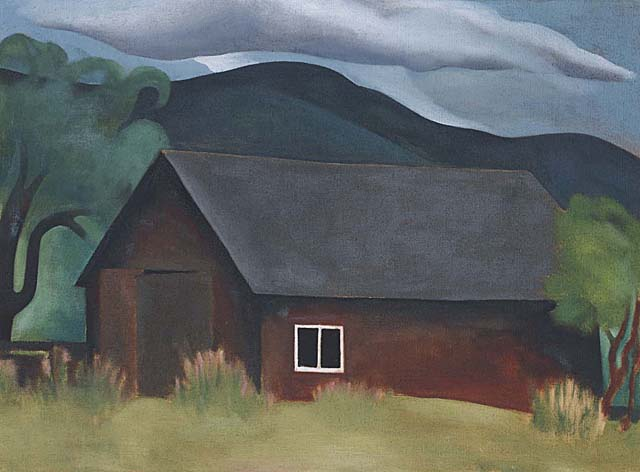
- Year: 1922
- Dimensions: 20 in (51 cm) × 27.125 in (68.90 cm)
- Location: The Phillips Collection
- Accession no.: 1448
- Website: My Shanty, Phillips Collection

My Shanty, Lake George is a 1922 painting by Georgia O'Keeffe. From 1918 to 1934, Georgia O'Keeffe spent part of the year at Alfred Stieglitz's family estate in Lake George. The depicted shanty was O'Keeffe's studio, which was painted in subdued tones in response to criticism from Stieglitz' circle—Arthur Dove, John Marin, Charles Demuth, Marsden Hartley, and Paul Strand. O'Keeffe said of the painting: "The clean, clear colors were in my head, but one day as I looked at the brown burned wood of the Shanty I thought, "I can paint one of those dismal-colored paintings like the men. I think just for fun I will try—all low-toned and dreary with the tree beside the door." My Shanty was the first painting by O'Keeffe purchased by Duncan Phillips.
