= O'Keeffe at the University of Virginia, 1912–1914 =

2016–19 art exhibition of works by Georgia O'Keeffe

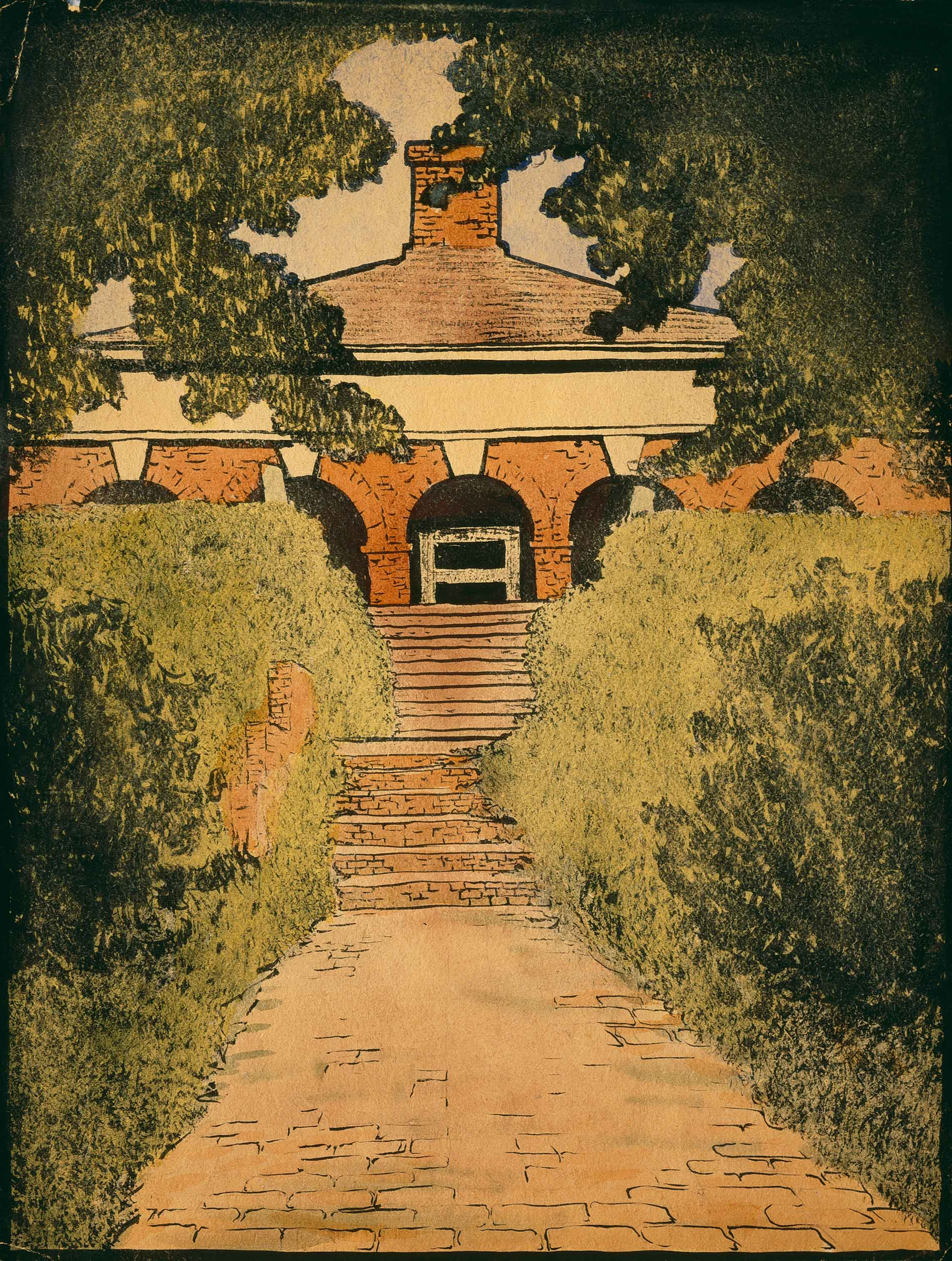
Georgia O'Keeffe, Untitled (University of Virginia), 1912–1914, Georgia O'Keeffe Museum, Santa Fe, New Mexico

O’Keeffe at the University of Virginia, 1912–1914 is an exhibition of watercolors that Georgia O'Keeffe created over three summers in the early 20th century at the University of Virginia. Shown at the Georgia O'Keeffe Museum in Santa Fe, New Mexico, the exhibit opened November 4, 2016 and ran through September 10, 2017. A year later, on October 19, 2018, the exhibition opened at the Fralin Museum of Art on the grounds of the University of Virginia, where it remained on display until January 27, 2019.

The works reflect her early development as an abstract artist, influenced by design principles of Arthur Wesley Dow. Through her exploration and growth as an artist, she helped to establish the American modernism movement and has been called the "Mother of American modernism".

== Background ==
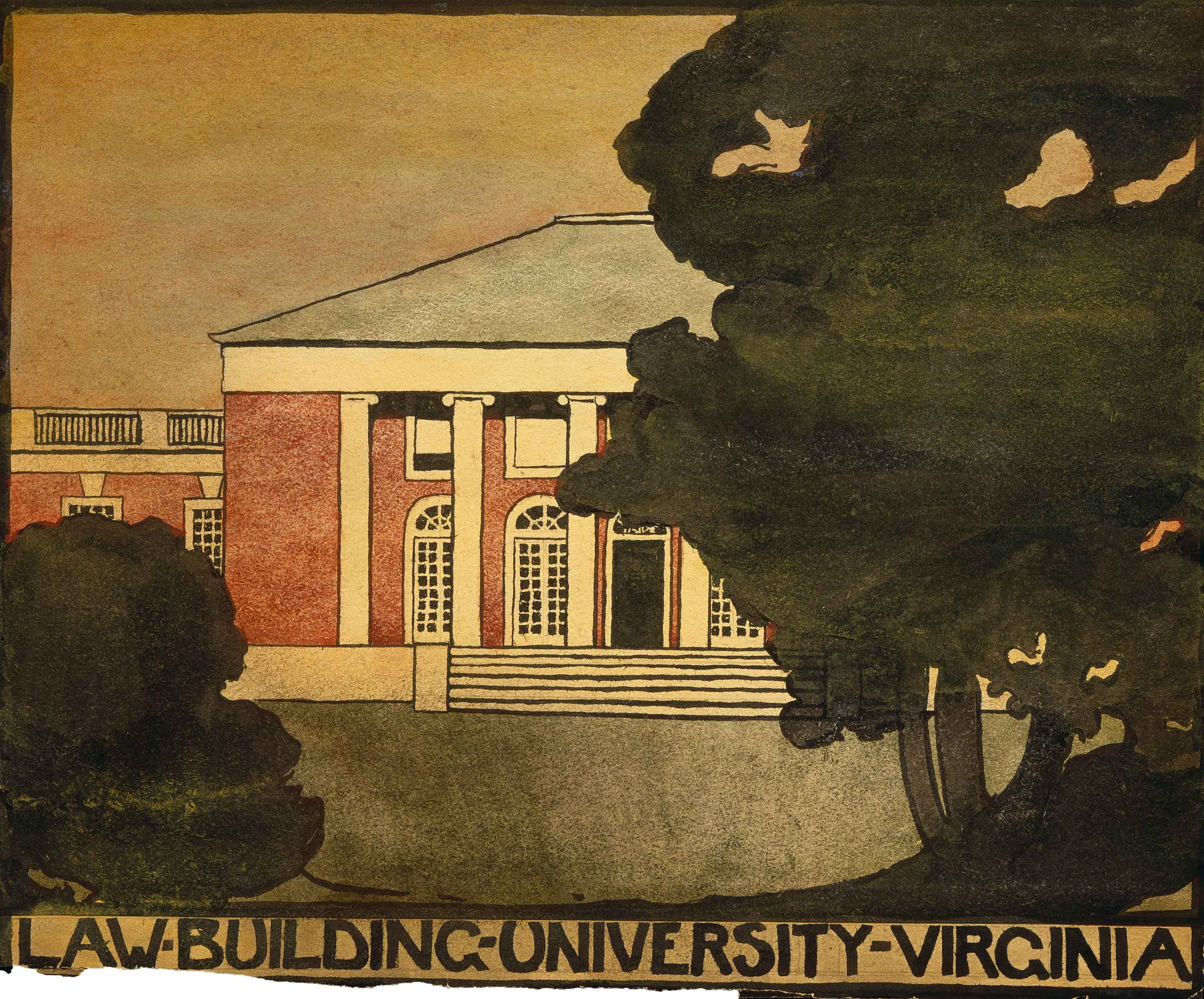
Untitled, Law Building, 1912–1914, Georgia O'Keeffe Museum

In 1908, O'Keeffe had become discouraged about creating representative works of art, her mother's poor health, her father's bankruptcy, and, later, her parents' separation. Losing interest in pursuing a career as an artist and unable to fund her education, she took a job as a graphic artist and then became a teacher. For a four-year period, she did not paint.

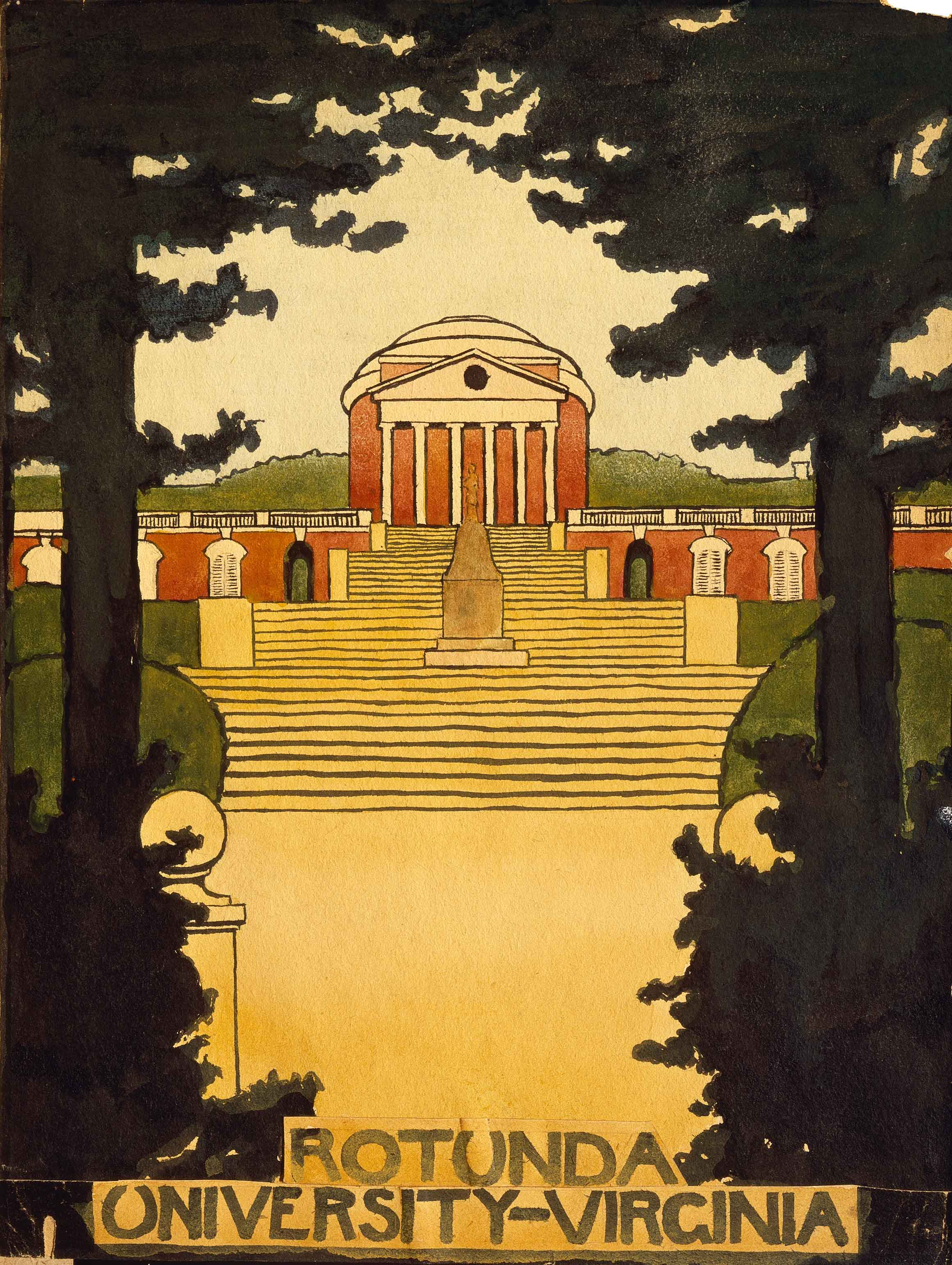
Untitled, The Rotunda, 1912–1914, Georgia O'Keeffe Museum

In the summer of 1912, she enrolled in an art class at the University of Virginia, the only time of year that women could attend the school. Alon Bemet, a Columbia University Teachers College faculty member, led the class that introduced innovative ideas of Arthur Wesley Dow that were based upon Japanese art design and composition principles. That summer she began to experiment with abstract compositions. O'Keeffe then taught during the school year, and returned for two more summers to take and teach classes at the university. During that time she stayed in her mother's boarding house in Charlottesville. She studied with Dow in the spring of 1914 at Teachers College of Columbia University.

== Overview ==
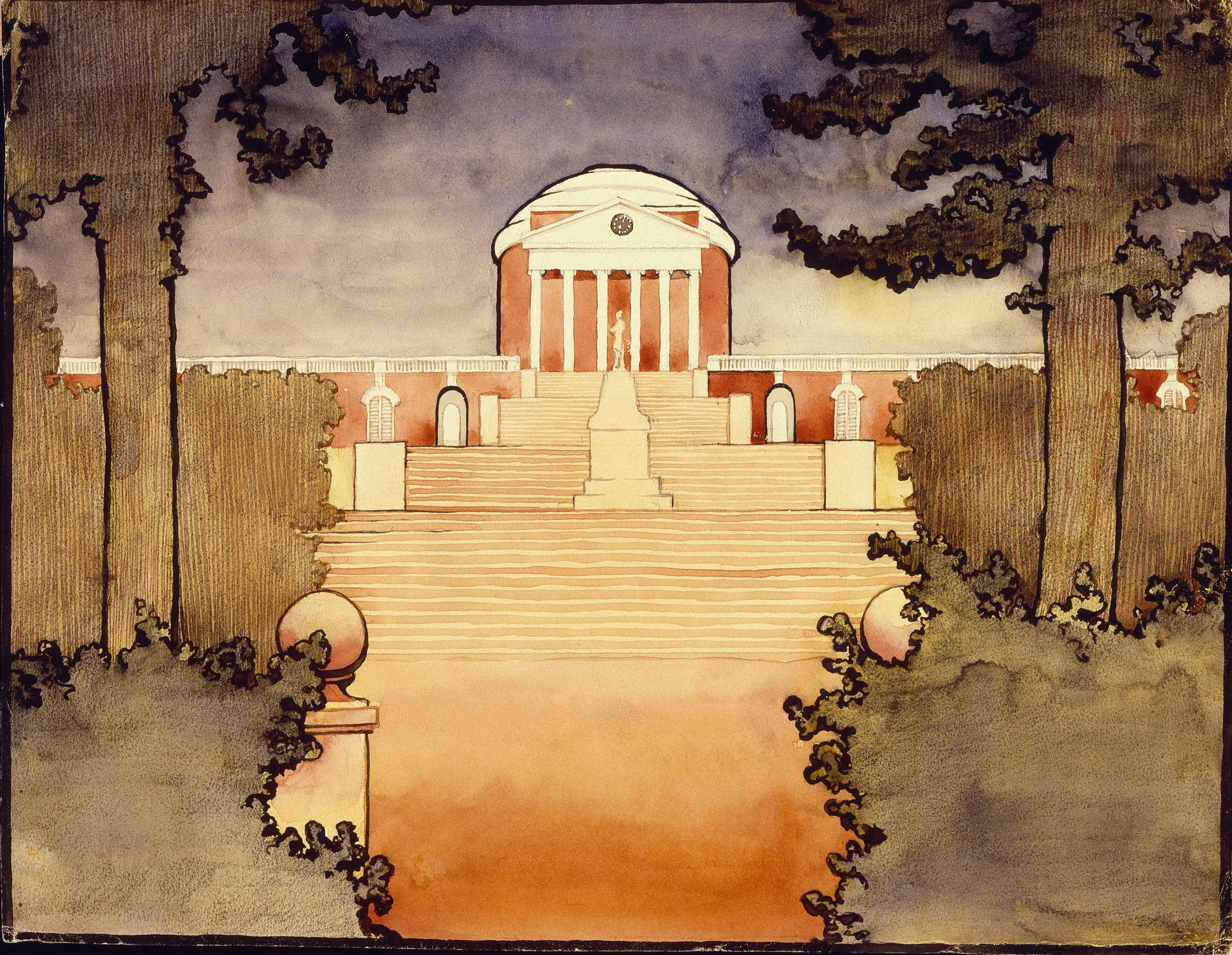
Untitled, The Rotunda, 1912–1914, Georgia O'Keeffe Museum

O'Keeffe mastered painting with the watercolors, using hand-ground pigments. She experimented with design, like using trees and shrubs to frame a painting. One of the exercises from Dow's book, Composition, is to create "a landscape, reduced to its main lines, all detail being omitted", like the way O'Keeffe excluded doors from some of the compositions. In her works, she simplified forms, experimented with composition, with the goal of creating a harmonious design and expressing her interpretation of the natural world. "The compositions are simple and refined, with flattened shapes, minus the frills and minute details of representationalism," according to Kathaleen Roberts of the Albuquerque Journal.

The watercolors, made on 11 7/8 x 9 inch (30.2 x 22.9 cm) paper, were held by O'Keeffe until her death and are now in the collection of the Georgia O'Keeffe Museum.

== Dow's influence ==
In 1915, O'Keefe had an epiphany that changed the way she created art from that time forward, based upon what she had learned from Dow:

"I was alone and singularly free, working on my own, unknown, (with) no one to satisfy but myself." And it suddenly struck her that "I had things in my head not like what I had been taught, not like what I had seen (but) shapes and ideas so familiar to me that it hadn't occurred to me to put them down. I decided to stop painting, to put away everything I had done, and start to say the things that were my own."

— "The Shape of Dow's Influence", The Los Angeles Times

Rather than representing what she saw, O'Keeffe developed radical charcoal drawings, with just a few lines, that led to greater development of total abstraction. In watercolor, she explored circular shapes and beginning in 1916, she created abstract landscapes of "bold and ethereal horizontal bands of color."
