= Adoro (band) =

German opera crossover music project

- Choir
- Origin: Germany
- Members: 4 (originally 5)
- Notable members: Peter Dasch; Nico Müller; Jandy Ganguly; Assaf Kacholi; Laszlo Maleczky (former)

Adoro is a German opera crossover music project that has had several hit albums for Universal.

== Members ==
- Peter Dasch (bass-baritone)
- Nico Müller (baritone)
- Jandy Ganguly (baritone)
- Assaf Kacholi (lyric tenor)
- Laszlo Maleczky (tenor) - former fifth member

== Discography ==
=== Albums ===
| Year | Album | Peak positions | | |
| Year | Album | GER | AUT | SWI |
|---|---|---|---|---|
| 2008 | Adoro | 1 | 5 | 43 |
| 2009 | Für immer und dich | 2 | 5 | 14 |
| 2010 | Glück | 3 | 2 | 60 |
| 2011 | Liebe meines Lebens | 4 | 10 | 25 |
| 2011 | Ein Abend mit Adoro – Live | 36 | — | — |
| 2012 | Träume | 14 | 17 | — |
| 2013 | Das Beste | 41 | 34 | — |
| 2014 | Nah bei dir | 16 | 25 | — |
| 2015 | Lichtblicke | 39 | 70 | — |
| 2017 | Irgendwo auf der Welt | 50 | — | — |

=== Singles ===
(Charting)

| Year | Title | Peak positions | Title |
| Year | Title | GER | Title |
|---|---|---|---|
| 2009 | "Liebe ist alles" | 60 | Adoro Das Beste |

=== Songs ===
(in alphabetical order)

| Letter | Title | Duration | Author(s) / Composer(s) | Album | Year |
|---|---|---|---|---|---|
| A | Alles an dir | 4:23 | Laith Al-Deen, A. C. Boutsen, Steffen Britzke | Irgendwo auf der Welt | 2017 |
| | Applaus, Applaus | 3:29 | Rüdiger Linhof, Florian Weber, Peter Brugger | Nah bei dir | 2014 |
| | Auf anderen Wegen | 4:03 | Andreas Bourani, Julius Hartog | Lichtblicke | 2015 |
| | Auf uns | 4:08 | Andreas Bourani, Julius Hartog, Thomas Olbrich | Lichtblicke | 2015 |
| B | Bei dir | 3:18 | Adel Tawil, Sera Finale, Robin Grubert | Irgendwo auf der Welt | 2017 |
| | Bitte hör nicht auf zu träumen | 4:06 | Xavier Naidoo, Matthew Tasa, Milan Martelli | Liebe meines Lebens | 2011 |
| D | Das Meer | 3:38 | Charles Trenet, Albert Lasry, Hans Fritz Beckmann | Nah bei dir | 2014 |
| | Dein ist mein ganzes Herz live | 3:06; 3:07 | Heinz Rudolf Kunze, Heiner Lürig | Liebe meines Lebens; Das Beste | 2011; 2013 |
| | Dein ist mein ganzes Herz (Duet with Helene Fischer) | 3:06; 3:03 | Heinz Rudolf Kunze, Heiner Lürig | Träume; Irgendwo auf der Welt | 2012; 2017 |
| | Dein Lied | 3:51 | Ralf Hildenbeutel, Laith Al-Deen, Matthias Hoffmann, Steffen Britzke | Liebe meines Lebens | 2011 |
| | Die Liebe ist eine Rose | 3:10 | Andy Hill, Connor Reeves, Laszlo Maleczky | Träume; Das Beste | 2012; 2013 |
| | Dieser Weg | 3:49 | Xavier Naidoo, Philippe Van Eecke | Adoro | 2008 |
| | Dir gehört mein Herz | 3:42 | Phil Collins, Frank Lenart | Träume | 2012 |
| | Du bist das Licht | 4:34 | Gregor Meyle, Christian Lohr | Lichtblicke | 2015 |
| | Du erinnerst mich an Liebe | 4:00 | Annette Humpe | Adoro | 2008 |
| | Durch den Sturm | 4:48 | Josef Bach, Arne Schumann, Matthias Schweighöfer, Jasmin Shakiri | Irgendwo auf der Welt | 2017 |
| E | Eiserner Steg | 4:11 | Philipp Poisel, Frank Pilsl, Florian Ostertag | Träume; Das Beste | 2012; 2013 |
| | Engel (I) | 3:04 | Maya Singh, Tor Endresen, Andy Lutschounig | Adoro | 2008 |
| | Engel (II) | 4:35 | Johannes Oerding | Lichtblicke | 2015 |
| | Engel fliegen einsam | 4:17 | Hannes Strasser | Glück | 2010 |
| | Es wird für ewig sein (Caruso) | 4:54 | Lucio Dalla | Adoro | 2008 |
| F | Finale (Outro) | 3:12 | Andy Lutschounig, Gregor Narholz | Adoro | 2008 |
| | Flugzeuge im Bauch | 4:40 | Herbert Grönemeyer | Adoro | 2008 |
| | Freiheit | 3:25 | Marius Müller-Westernhagen | Für immer und dich Das Beste | 2009; 2013 |
| | Für dich | 4:37 | Dieter Bohlen, Klaus Hirschburger, Lukas Hilbert | Liebe meines Lebens | 2011 |
| | Für immer jung Forever Young (Karel Gott and Bushido version) | 3:46 | Bernhard Lloyd, Marian Gold, Frank Mertens | Träume | 2012 |
| | Für immer und dich | 5:05 | Rio Reiser | Für immer und dich | 2009 |
| | Für mich soll’s rote Rosen regnen | 4:00 | Hans Hammerschmid, Hildegard Knef | Liebe meines Lebens | 2011 |
| G | Geboren um zu leben | 5:05 | Der Graf, Henning Verlage | Glück | 2010 |
| | Geweint vor Glück | 4:18 | Hartmut Engler, Ingo Reidl | Glück | 2010 |
| | Gib mir Sonne | 4:34 | Peter Plate, Ulf Leo Sommer, AnNa R. | Glück | 2010 |
| | Große Freiheit | 4:28 | Der Graf, Henning Verlage | Liebe meines Lebens | 2011 |
| H | Halt dich an mir fest | 4:43 | Johannes Strate, Niels Grötsch, Kristoffer Hünecke, Jakob Sinn | Liebe meines Lebens | 2011 |
| | Halt mich | 3:59 | Herbert Grönemeyer | Für immer und dich Das Beste | 2009; 2013 |
| | Halt mich fest Take On Me | 4:07 | Magne Furuholmen, Morten Harket, Pål Waaktaar | Glück | 2010 |
| | Haus am See | 4:15 | Pierre Baigorry, David Conen, Ruth-Maria Renner, Vincent Graf von Schlippenbach (DJ Illvibe) | Nah bei dir | 2014 |
| | Helden | 3:53 | David Bowie, Bryan Eno | Glück | 2010 |
| | Horizont | 4:48 | Udo Lindenberg, Bea Reszat | Für immer und dich Das Beste | 2009; 2013 |
| I | Ich atme ein | 3:47 | Frank Ramond, Matthias Haß | Nah bei dir | 2014 |
| | Ich bin ich (wir sind wir) | 4:26 | Peter Plate, Ulf Leo Sommer, AnNa R. | Für immer und dich | 2009 |
| | Ich glaube | 4:11 | Udo Jürgens, Walter Brandin | Für immer und dich | 2009 |
| | Ich hab' dich lieb | 3:53 | Herbert Grönemeyer | Irgendwo auf der Welt | 2017 |
| | Ich lass für dich das Licht an | 3:55 | Nils Grötsch, Kristoffer Hünecke, Jacob Sinn, Johannes Strate | Lichtblicke | 2015 |
| | Ich lebe für dich | 4:11 | Marco Marinangeli, Laszlo Maleczky | Träume | 2012 |
| | Ich will nur | 3:37 | Frank Pilsl, Philipp Poisel | Irgendwo auf der Welt | 2017 |
| | Irgendwie, irgendwo, irgendwann | 4:22 | Uwe Fahrenkrog-Petersen, Nena Kerner | Adoro; Das Beste | 2008; 2013 |
| | Irgendwo auf der Welt | 4:58 | Werner Richard Heymann, Robert Gilbert | Irgendwo auf der Welt | 2017 |
| | Ist da jemand | 4:26 | Adel Tawil, Nicolas Rebscher, Simon Triebel, Alexander Zuckowski | Irgendwo auf der Welt | 2017 |
| K | Kribbeln im Bauch | | Pe Werner | Lichtblicke | 2015 |
| | Küssen kann man nicht alleine | 4:43 | Annette Humpe, Max Raabe, Christoph Israel | Nah bei dir | 2014 |
| L | Lächeln | 3:36 | Geoffrey Parsons, Charles Chaplin, John Turner, Mathias Weibrich | Nah bei dir | 2014 |
| | Lass mich bei dir sein | 3:27 | Hildegard Knef, Günter Noris | Das Beste | 2013 |
| | Lass uns leben | 3:31 | Marius Müller-Westernhagen | Nah bei dir | 2014 |
| | Leise rieselt der Schnee | 3:37 | Eduard Ebel | Irgendwo auf der Welt | 2017 |
| | Leuchtturm | 3:27 | Jörn-Uwe Fahrenkrog-Petersen, Nena Kerner | Glück | 2010 |
| | Liebe ist | 5:08 | Jörn-Uwe Fahrenkrog-Petersen, Nena Kerner | Für immer und dich Das Beste | 2009; 2013 |
| | Liebe ist alles | 3:22 | Peter Plate, Ulf Leo Sommer, AnNa R. | Adoro; Das Beste | 2008; 2013 |
| | Liebe meines Lebens | 4:11 | Christian Lohr, Maya Singh | Liebe meines Lebens | 2011 |
| M | Maria durch ein Dornwald ging | 2:10 | | Irgendwo auf der Welt | 2017 |
| | Merci, Chérie | 3:03 | Udo Jürgens, Thomas Hörbiger | Adoro | 2008 |
| | Millionen Lichter | 3:58 | Tobias Röger | Lichtblicke | 2015 |
| | Mit Leib und Seele | 3:34 | Heinz Rudolf Kunze, Xavier Heiner Lürig | Nah bei dir | 2014 |
| | Momente | 3:26 | Peter Dasch, Mathias Weibrich | Lichtblicke | 2015 |
| N | Nah bei dir | 3:15 | Burt Bacharach, Hal David | Nah bei dir | 2014 |
| | Nessaja | 5:20 | Rolf Zuckowski, Peter Maffay | Glück; Das Beste | 2010; 2013 |
| | Nie genug | 4:06 | Thorsten Brötzmann, Ivo Moring, Alexander Geringas | Das Beste | 2013 |
| | Nur noch kurz die Welt retten | 3:40 | Simon Triebel, Tim Bendzko, Mo Brandis | Nah bei dir | 2014 |
| O | Ohne dich | 4:21 | Michael Kunze, Stefan Zauner, Aron Strobel | Adoro | 2008 |
| | Ouvertüre (Intro) | 2:02 | Andy Lutschounig | Adoro | 2008 |
| P | Prélude / Intro | 2:36 | — | Glück | 2010 |
| S | Schau mich bitte nicht so an | 4:04 | Ralph Maria Siegel, Edith Piaf, Louiguy, Hans Doll | Das Beste | 2013 |
| | Schlaflied (kein Stern der fällt) | 4:22 | Jon Rydningen, Heike Kospach, Nicholas Ian Hammond, Sverrir Bergman | Für immer und dich | 2009 |
| | Sie sieht mich nicht | 4:45 | Gisela Steineckert, Dirk Michaelis | Für immer und dich | 2009 |
| | Solang’ man Träume noch leben kann | 3:36 | Stefan Zauner, Aron Strobel | Träume | 2012 |
| | So soll es bleiben | 3:50 | Annette Humpe, Adel Tawil, Florian Fischer, Sebastian Kirchner | Für immer und dich | 2009 |
| | Stadt | 4:22 | Heike Kospach, Florian Fischer, Sebastian Kirchner, Marek Pompetzki, Paul NZA, Adel Tawil | Träume | 2012 |
| | Stark | 4:21 | Annette Humpe, Adel-El Tawil, Sebastian Kirchner, Florian Fischer | Lichtblicke | 2015 |
| | Still live | 4:48; 4:57 | Sascha Eigner, Nicholas Müller | Liebe meines Lebens; Das Beste | 2011; 2013 |
| | Stille Nacht; German "Stille Nacht, heilige Nacht" | 3:48 | Franz Xaver Gruber, Joseph Mohr | Irgendwo auf der Welt | 2017 |
| | Still, still, still | 3:45 | Georg Götsch | Irgendwo auf der Welt | 2017 |
| | Süßer die Glocken nie klingen | 3:43 | Friedrich Wilhelm Kritzinger | Irgendwo auf der Welt | 2017 |
| T | Tage wie diese | 4:58 | Andreas Frege, Andreas von Holst, Birgit Minichmayr | Träume | 2012 |
| | Tanz der Moleküle | 3:38 | Nhoah, Mieze | Liebe meines Lebens | 2011 |
| U | Über sieben Brücken | 4:34 | Helmut Richter, Ulrich Swillms | Adoro; Das Beste | 2008; 2013 |
| | Und wenn ein Lied | 4:58 | Xavier Naidoo, Michael Herberger | Adoro | 2008 |
| | Universum | 4:30 | Annette Humpe | Liebe meines Lebens | 2011 |
| V | Vom selben Stern | 3:48 | Annette Humpe, Florian Fischer, Sebastian Kirchner, Adel Tawil | Träume; Das Beste | 2012; 2013 |
| W | Weil mein Herz dich nie mehr vergisst | 5:03 | Céline Dion, James Horner, Will Jennings | Lichtblicke | 2015 |
| | Weinst du | 3:51; 4:44 | Joachim Schlüter, Jan Kelber, Stefan Endrigkeit, Lars Plogschties, Dirk Züther | Träume; Das Beste | 2012; 2013 |
| | Wenn Worte meine Sprache wären | 4:07 | Tim Bendzko | Träume | 2012 |
| | Wieder hier | 4:56 | Marius Müller-Westernhagen | Glück | 2010 |
| | Wie der Wind sich dreht | 5:41 | Klaus Meine, Erik Macholl | Glück | 2010 |
| | Wie schön du bist | 3:53 | Sarah Connor, Peter Plate, Ulf Leo Sommer, Daniel Faust | Lichtblicke | 2015 |
| | Wir sind am Leben | 4:34 | Peter Plate, Ulf Leo Sommer | Träume | 2012 |
| | Wo willst du hin | 3:50 | Xavier Naidoo, Michael Herberger | Nah bei dir | 2014 |
| | Wunder gescheh’n live | 3:49; 4:20 | Nena Kerner, Jürgen Dehmel | Liebe meines Lebens; Das Beste | 2011; 2013 |
| | Wundervolle Welt | 3:38 | George David Weiss, Bob Thiele, Fabian W. Williges | Nah bei dir | 2014 |
