= Filter (album) =

Studio album by Tim Bendzko
- Released: 18 October 2019
- Length: 39:33
- Label: Jive
- Producer: Timothy Auld; Benedikt Schöller

Tim Bendzko chronology
Immer noch Mensch (2016)	Filter (2019)	April (2023)

Filter is the fourth studio album by German recording artist Tim Bendzko. It was released by Jive Records on 18 October 2019, following his transition from Columbia Records after the release of his previous album Immer noch Mensch (2016). Bendzko worked producers Timothy Auld and Benedikt Schöller on Filter which debuted and peaked at number three on the German Albums Chart in 2019.

== Critical reception ==
Professional ratings
Review scores
Source	Rating
CDStarts	4/10
laut.de	1/5 stars

laut.de editor Jeremias Heppeler rated the album one out of five stars. He remarked that "you may notice a few moments of risk on Filter, but apart from the slightly more driving "Hoch", which still suffers from its own banality, Tim Bendzko remains the producer of the sweet, harmless "I'm flying to Australia after my high school"-music. Telenovela music. Music for people who don't like music, feelings for people who don't think about their feelings and thoughts for those who don't like to think."

== Track listing ==
All tracks produced by Timothy Auld and Benedikt Schöller.

Filter track listing
No.	Title	Lyrics	Music	Length
1.	"Jetzt bin ich ja hier"	Tim Bendzko; Julian von Dohnanyi	Bendzko; von Dohnanyi; Timothy Auld; Benedikt Schöller	2:48
2.	"Dieses Herz"	Bendzko; von Dohnanyi; Klaus Sahm	Tim Bendzko; von Dohnanyi; Sahm	3:26
3.	"Nicht genug" (featuring Kool Savas)	Bendzko; von Dohnanyi; Savas	Bendzko; von Dohnanyi; Auld; Schöller	3:00
4.	"Nur wegen dir"	Bendzko; von Dohnanyi; Toni Mudrack	Bendzko; von Dohnanyi; Mudrack; Manith Bertz	2:53
5.	"Für immer"	Bendzko; von Dohnanyi	Bendzko; von Dohnanyi	3:03
6.	"Hoch"	Bendzko; von Dohnanyi; Mudrack	Bendzko; von Dohnanyi; Auld; Schöller; Mudrack	2:48
7.	"Laut"	Bendzko; von Dohnanyi	Bendzko; von Dohnanyi; Auld; Schöller	3:00
8.	"Trag dich"	Bendzko; von Dohnanyi	Bendzko; von Dohnanyi; Auld; Schöller	3:12
9.	"Freier Fall" (featuring Milow)	Bendzko; Chris Ayer; Jonathan Vandenbroeck	Bendzko	3:12
10.	"Nie mehr zurück"	Bendzko; von Dohnanyi; Sahm	Tim Bendzko; von Dohnanyi; Auld; Schöller; Sahm	2:53
11.	"Vielleicht"	Bendzko; von Dohnanyi	Bendzko; von Dohnanyi; Auld; Schöller	2:45
12.	"Leise"	Bendzko; Mudrack	Bendzko; Mudrack; Bertz	3:03
13.	"An deiner Seite"	Bendzko; von Dohnanyi; Sahm	Bendzko; von Dohnanyi; Sahm	3:24
Total length:				39:33

== Charts ==
Weekly chart performance for Filter
Chart (2019)	Peak position
Austrian Albums (Ö3 Austria)	18
German Albums (Offizielle Top 100)	3
Swiss Albums (Schweizer Hitparade)	26

== Release history ==
Filter release history
Region	Date	Format	Label	Ref.
Various	18 October 2019	Digital download; CD	Jive Records; Sony Music	
