= Summer Days (disambiguation) =

Summer Days is a 2006 Japanese video game.

Summer Days may also refer to:

- Summer Days (Georgia O'Keeffe), a 1936 painting
- Summer Days (And Summer Nights!!), an album by the Beach Boys, 1965
- "Summer Days" (Bob Dylan song), 2001
- "Summer Days" (Martin Garrix song), 2019
- "Summer Days" (Tony Romeo song), originally recorded by the Partridge Family, 1971; covered by Lou Christie, 1975
- "Summer Days", a song by Arizona, 2018
- "Summer Days", a song by Inna from Inna, 2015
- "Summer Days", a song by Milow featuring Sebastián Yatra, 2017

== See also ==
- Summer (disambiguation)
