= Heintje Simons discography =

- Studio albums: 32
- Compilation albums: 8+
- Singles: 89
- Video albums: 6
- Christmas albums: 5

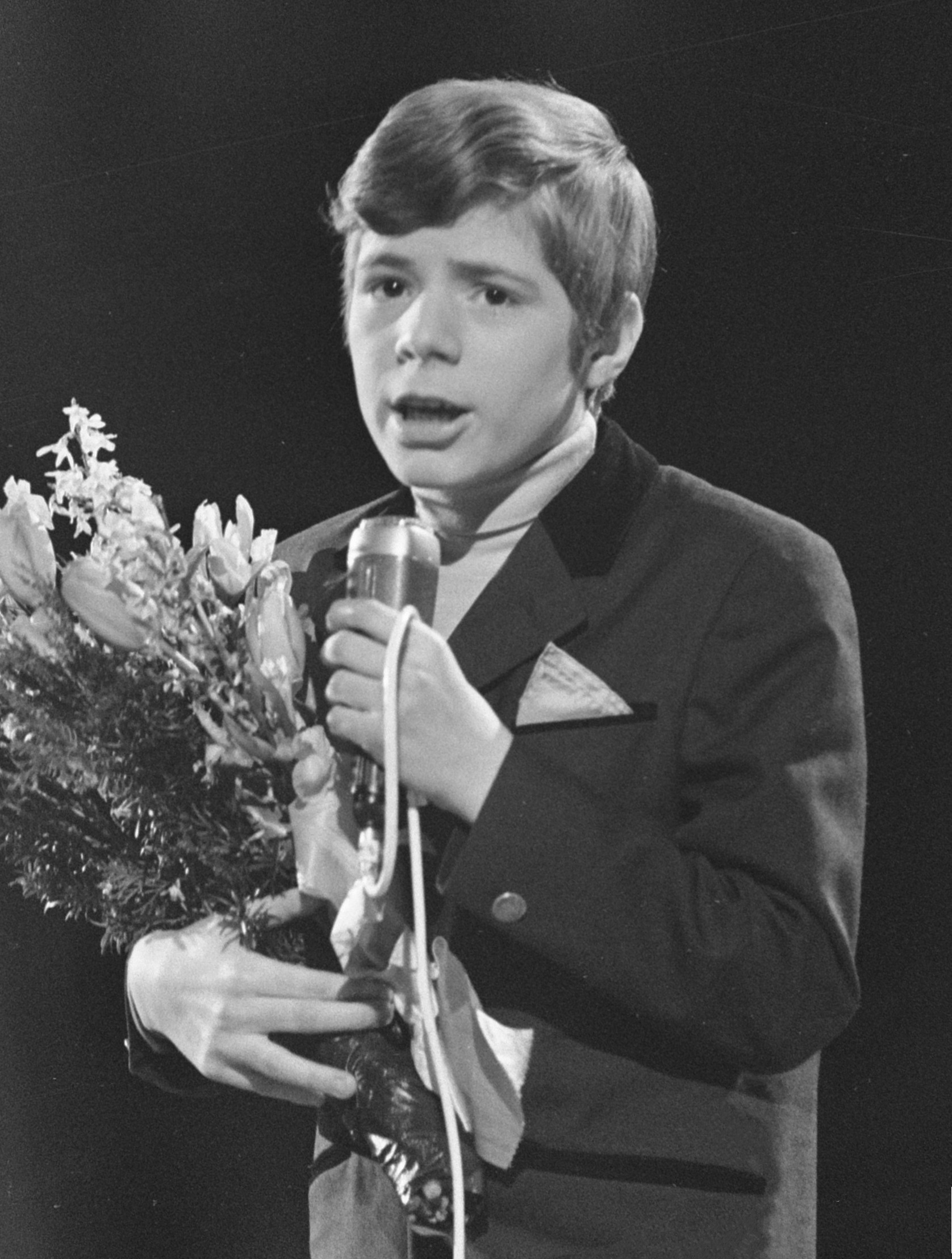
Heintje during the Grand Gala du Disque Populaire 1970

This is the discography of Dutch Schlager singer Heintje Simons, who has also released music mononymously as Heintje and as Hein Simons.

== Albums ==
=== Studio albums ===
Title	Album details	Peak chart positions								Sales	Certifications
Title	Album details	NL	AUS	AUT	CAN	DEN	GER	SWI	US	Sales	Certifications
Dit is Heintje	Released: April 1968; Label: CNR; Dutch language	10	—	—	—	—	—	—	—		NL: Gold
Heintje	Released: May 1968; Label: Ariola, CNR; German language	—	20	—	—	3	1	—	—	GER: 1,250,000; SWI: 68,000; WW: 2,000,000	GER: 9× Gold, Platinum
Ich sing ein Lied für dich	Released: October 1969; Label: Ariola, CNR; German language	—	—	—	—	2	1	—	—		GER: 2× Gold
Dein schönster Tag	Released: July 1970; Label: Ariola, CNR; German language	—	—	—	—	—	6	—	—		GER: Gold
I'm Your Little Boy	Released: September 1970; Label: Polydor, CNR; English language	—	—	—	22	—	—	—	—		
Mama	Released: November 1970; Label: MGM; English language	—	—	—	—	—	—	—	108		
Herzlichst Heintje	Released: December 1970; Label: Ariola, CNR; German language	—	—	—	—	—	6	—	—		
Wenn wir alle Sonntagskinder wär’n	Released: December 1971; Label: Ariola, CNR, Polydor; German language	—	—	—	—	—	37	—	—		
Ich denk’ an dich	Released: 1973; Label: Ariola, Polydor; German language	—	—	—	—	—	—	—	—		
Junger Mann mit 19	Released: 1974; Label: Ariola; German language	—	—	—	—	—	—	—	—		
Suid-Afrika, Jou Hart Is Weer Myne	Released: 1975; Label: Polydor; Afrikaans language	—	—	—	—	—	—	—	—		
Heintje sing van liefde en verlange	Released: 1976; Label: Polydor; Afrikaans language	—	—	—	—	—	—	—	—		
Ich habe Freunde	Released: 1979; Label: Ariola; German language	—	—	—	—	—	—	—	—		
Herzensmelodie	Released: 1989; Label: Music Land; German language	—	—	—	—	—	—	—	—		
Ich hab’ so lange gesucht nach dir	Released: 1992; Label: Music Land; German language	—	—	—	—	—	—	—	—		
Mein zweites Leben	Released: 1996; Label: CNR; German language	—	—	—	—	—	—	—	—		
Ich schenk’ dir meine Liebe	Released: 16 March 1998; Label: Jupiter; German language	—	—	—	—	—	—	—	—		
Noch einmal mit Gefühl	Released: 8 November 1999; Label: Jupiter; German language	—	—	—	—	—	—	—	—		
Heute und ein bisschen gestern	Released: 8 November 1999; Label: Jupiter; German language	—	—	—	—	—	—	—	—		
Heute und ein bisschen gestern	Released: 28 March 2001; Label: Koch; German language	—	—	—	—	—	—	—	—		
Rück ein Stückchen näher	Released: 13 September 2002; Label: Koch; German language	—	—	—	—	—	—	—	—		
Von Herz zu Herz	Released: 15 February 2003; Label: LaserLight; German language	—	—	—	—	—	—	—	—		
Frauen... sind was Wunderbares	Released: 5 April 2004; Label: Koch; German language	—	—	—	—	—	—	—	—		
Ich sag’ Danke	Released: 25 June 2005; Label: DA Music; German language	—	—	—	—	—	—	—	—		
Männer sind einfach zu gut	Released: 17 November 2006; Label: DA Music; German language	—	—	—	—	—	—	—	—		
Träum' mit mir heintje	Released: 22 February 2008; Label: DA Music; German language	—	—	—	—	—	—	—	—		
Alles halb so schlimm	Released: 4 September 2009; Label: DA Music; German language	—	—	—	—	—	—	—	—		
Leb deinen Traum	Released: 23 September 2011; Label: DA Music; German language	—	—	—	—	—	—	—	—		
Thuis	Released: 19 September 2014; Label: Jaz Music; Dutch language	27	—	—	—	—	—	—	—		
Vertrau auf Dein Herz	Released: 4 September 2015; Label: DA Music; German language	—	—	—	—	—	—	—	—		
Heintje und Ich	Released: 1 December 2017; Label: Telamo; German language	—	—	29	—	—	9	20	—		GER: Gold
Lebenslieder	Released: 6 September 2019; Label: Telamo; German language	—	—	24	—	—	5	8	—		
"—" denotes releases that did not chart or were not released in that territory.											

=== Christmas albums ===
Title	Album details	Peak chart positions		Sales	Certifications
Title	Album details	DEN	GER	Sales	Certifications
Weihnachten mit Heintje	Released: November 1968; Label: CNR; German language	5	2	NL: 50,000; GER: 1,000,000; SWI: 20,000	GER: 6× Gold
When the Christmas Bells Are Ringing	Released: December 1971; Label: Polydor; English language	—	—		
Fröhliche Weihnacht überall	Released: 1971; Label: Ariola, CNR, Polydor; German language	—	—		
Weiße Weihnacht	Released: 1977; Label: Ariola; German language	—	—		
Weihnachten mit Hein Simons	Released: 2 November 2007; Label: Austrophon; German language	—	—		
"—" denotes releases that did not chart or were not released in that territory.					

=== Charting compilations ===
Title	Album details	Peak chart positions			
Title	Album details	NL	AUT	GER	SWI
Stars in Gold	Released: June 1971; Label: Ariola	—	—	28	—
Erinnerungen	Released: February 1979; Label: K-tel	—	8	—	—
Mama – Jij bent de allerliefste van de hele wereld	Released: September 1987; Label: Star	53	—	—	—
De allergrootste successen	Released: 31 May 1997; Label: CNR	26	—	—	—
Das Beste – Seine schönsten Volkslieder	Released: 5 April 2013; Label: Telamo	—	—	58	—
Seine größten Erfolge	Released: 11 March 2016; Label: Telamo	—	39	13	67
Kult Album Klassiker	Released: 23 August 2018; Label: Telamo	—	—	—	69
Die große Jubiläumsedition	Released: 14 May 2021; Label: Telamo	—	—	14	—
"—" denotes releases that did not chart or were not released in that territory.

=== Video albums ===
Title	Album details	Peak chart positions		
Title	Album details	NL	AUT	SWI
Mama	Released: 16 June 2005; Label: Universal/BR Music	—	—	—
Hein Simons – Die schönsten Show-Auftritte im TV	Released: 2 November 2007; Label: DA Music	—	—	—
Das Beste	Released: 5 April 2013; Label: Telamo	28	8	—
Seine größten Erfolge	Released: 11 March 2016; Label: Telamo	—	1	—
Heintje und ich	Released: 1 December 2017; Label: Telamo	—	1	2
Lebenslieder	Released: 6 September 2019; Label: Telamo	—	3	—
"—" denotes releases that did not chart or were not released in that territory.

== Singles ==
Name	Year	Peak chart positions										Sales
Name	Year	NL 40	AUS	AUT	BE (FLA)	CAN	DEN	GER	SA	SWI	US	Sales
"Mama" (Dutch version)	1967	9	—	—	15	—	—	—	—	—	—	
"Mama" (German version) /	1967	—	—	3	—	—	—	2	—	—	—	NL: 100,000; GER: 500,000
"Zwei kleine Sterne"	1967	—	—	15	—	—	—	—	—	—	—	
"Stille Nacht, heilige Nacht"	1967	—	—	—	—	—	—	—	—	—	—	
"Mama vertel me (Beautiful Dreamer)"	1968	17	—	—	—	—	—	—	—	—	—	
"Du sollst nicht weinen" /	1968	—	—	10	—	—	9	1	—	3	—	WW: 1,000,000; SWI: 90,000
"Ich bau' Dir ein Schloß"	1968	1	—	10	5	—	—	—	—	—	—	NL: 100,000; GER: 500,000
"Heidschi Bumbeidschi" /	1968	1	75	5	5	—	12	1	—	5	—	WW: 1,000,000
"Eine kleine Abschiedsträne"	1968	—	—	13	—	—	—	—	—	—	—	
"Gloria in excelsis Deo"	1968	—	—	—	—	—	—	—	—	—	—	
"Leise rieselt der Schnee" (South Africa-only release)	1969	—	—	—	—	—	—	—	19	—	—	
"Oma'tje Lief"	1969	29	—	—	—	—	—	—	—	—	—	
"Ich sing' ein Lied für Dich"	1969	17	100	9	—	—	4	1	—	4	—	
"Scheiden tut so weh"	1969	21	—	17	—	—	5	4	—	8	—	
"I'm Your Little Boy"	1969	7	17	—	—	44	—	—	—	—	—	NZ: 30,000; AUS: 50,000
"Moeders Verjaardag (Wo du nicht bist)"	1970	—	—	—	—	—	—	—	—	—	—	
"Ik hou van Holland"	1970	17	—	—	15	—	—	—	—	—	—	
"Deine Tränen sind auch meine"	1970	—	—	12	—	—	9	14	—	—	—	
"Es kann nicht immer nur die Sonne scheinen"	1970	—	—	—	—	—	—	12	—	—	—	
"Mama" (English version)	1970	—	—	—	—	—	—	—	—	—	112	
"Mother's Tears (Du sollst nicht weinen)" (UK-only release)	1971	—	—	—	—	—	—	—	—	—	—	
"Schneeglöckchen im Februar, Goldregen im Mai"	1971	—	—	—	—	—	—	4	—	—	—	
"Jij bent de allerbeste"	1971	28	—	—	—	—	—	—	—	—	—	
"Schön sind die Märchen vergangener Zeit"	1971	—	—	—	—	—	—	23	—	—	—	
"Lalalai (Schön sind die Märchen vergangener Zeit)"	1971	—	—	—	—	—	—	—	—	—	—	
"Alle schönen Dinge dieser Welt"	1971	—	—	—	—	—	—	25	—	—	—	
"Es war alles wunderschön"	1972	—	—	—	—	—	—	—	—	—	—	
"Meine Liebe für Dich"	1972	—	—	—	—	—	—	—	—	—	—	
"Ich denk' an Dich"	1973	—	—	—	24	— (Note: Peaked at number 79 on the RPM Pop Music Playlist chart.)	—	18	—	—	—	
"Ik denk aan jou"	1973	—	—	—	—	—	—	—	—	—	—	
"Hé, ga je mee"	1974	—	—	—	—	—	—	—	—	—	—	
"Ihr habt nie die Sterne gezählt"	1974	—	—	—	—	—	—	—	—	—	—	
"Morgen ist Sonntag"	1974	—	—	—	—	—	—	—	—	—	—	
"De zwerver"	1974	—	—	—	—	—	—	—	—	—	—	
"Jou hart is weer myne" (South Africa-only release)	1975	—	—	—	—	—	—	—	6	—	—	
"Sag' auf Wiederseh'n"	1975	—	—	—	—	—	—	—	—	—	—	
"Nimm dir Zeit für deine Träume"	1975	—	—	—	—	—	—	—	—	—	—	
"Ein and'res Mädchen will ich nicht"	1975	—	—	—	—	—	—	—	—	—	—	
"Op My Harmonika" (South Africa-only release)	1976	—	—	—	—	—	—	—	—	—	—	
"Weit ist der Weg nach Santa Cruz"	1976	—	—	—	—	—	—	—	—	—	—	
"Laten wij vrienden zijn"	1976	—	—	—	—	—	—	—	—	—	—	
"Ruiter van die windjie" (South Africa-only release)	1976	—	—	—	—	—	—	—	—	—	—	
"Gloria dem jungen Paar"	1977	—	—	—	—	—	—	—	—	—	—	
"Und das alles nur, weil wir uns lieben"	1978	27	—	—	—	—	—	—	—	—	—	
"Perdonna me (Verzeih mir)"	1979	—	—	—	—	—	—	—	—	—	—	
"Ich geh' durch diese Stadt"	1981	—	—	—	—	—	—	—	—	—	—	
"Der Single"	1982	—	—	—	—	—	—	—	—	—	—	
"Geef me een kans"	1984	—	—	—	—	—	—	—	—	—	—	
"Vom Winde verweht"	1984	—	—	—	—	—	—	—	—	—	—	
"Wenn ein Stern vom Himmel fällt"	1989	—	—	—	—	—	—	—	—	—	—	
"Liefdesmelodie"	1990	—	—	—	—	—	—	—	—	—	—	
"Ein Mutterherz soll niemals weinen"	1990	—	—	—	—	—	—	—	—	—	—	
"Ich hab' so lange gesucht nach dir"	1992	—	—	—	—	—	—	—	—	—	—	
"Die Heimat darfst du nie vergessen"	1994	—	—	—	—	—	—	—	—	—	—	
"Mama '95"	1995	—	—	—	—	—	—	—	—	—	—	
"Ich schenk' dir meine Liebe"	1998	—	—	—	—	—	—	—	—	—	—	
"Komm tanz nochmal ganz eng mit mir"	1998	—	—	—	—	—	—	—	—	—	—	
"Heute und ein bisschen gestern"	2001	—	—	—	—	—	—	—	—	—	—	
"Wenn der Südwind weht"	2001	—	—	—	—	—	—	—	—	—	—	
"Ball Paradox"	2002	—	—	—	—	—	—	—	—	—	—	
"So wie ein Stern"	2002	—	—	—	—	—	—	—	—	—	—	
"Es ist nur der Regen"	2002	—	—	—	—	—	—	—	—	—	—	
"Frauen sind was wunderbares"	2004	—	—	—	—	—	—	—	—	—	—	
"Ich sag’ Danke"	2005	—	—	—	—	—	—	—	—	—	—	
"Hallo wie geht’s"	2006	—	—	—	—	—	—	—	—	—	—	
"10 Jahre Urlaubsglück"	2006	—	—	—	—	—	—	—	—	—	—	
"Plaisir d’amour" (with Johannes Heesters)	2006	—	—	—	—	—	—	—	—	—	—	
"Träume sind wie kleine Boote"	2007	—	—	—	—	—	—	—	—	—	—	
"Endlich Winter (Ja, es schneit)"	2007	—	—	—	—	—	—	—	—	—	—	
"Domenica"	2008	—	—	—	—	—	—	—	—	—	—	
"Tausendmal"	2008	—	—	—	—	—	—	—	—	—	—	
"Für alle Kinder"	2008	—	—	—	—	—	—	—	—	—	—	
"Verlange von mir was du willst"	2009	—	—	—	—	—	—	—	—	—	—	
"Lena (Das muss Liebe sein)"	2009	—	—	—	—	—	—	—	—	—	—	
"Kann nicht sein ohne dich"	2009	—	—	—	—	—	—	—	—	—	—	
"Lebe deinen Traum"	2010	—	—	—	—	—	—	—	—	—	—	
"Nie mehr deine Nähe spür’n"	2010	—	—	—	—	—	—	—	—	—	—	
"Alles halb so schlimm"	2011	—	—	—	—	—	—	—	—	—	—	
"Ich komm einfach nicht mehr von dir los"	2011	—	—	—	—	—	—	—	—	—	—	
"Tausend Gründe"	2012	—	—	—	—	—	—	—	—	—	—	
"Für immer"	2012	—	—	—	—	—	—	—	—	—	—	
"Vorbei"	2012	—	—	—	—	—	—	—	—	—	—	
"Bleib bei mir heut’ Nacht"	2013	—	—	—	—	—	—	—	—	—	—	
"Mein Kind"	2013	—	—	—	—	—	—	—	—	—	—	
"Gestolen uren"	2014	—	—	—	—	—	—	—	—	—	—	
"Eine Frau wie du"	2016	—	—	—	—	—	—	—	—	—	—	
"Het land van Vondel en Piet Hein"	2019	—	—	—	—	—	—	—	—	—	—	
"Shadows Are Long, the Day Is Gone"	2019	—	—	—	—	—	—	—	—	—	—	
"Wo meine Sonne scheint"	2019	—	—	—	—	—	—	—	—	—	—	
"—" denotes releases that did not chart or were not released in that territory.												
