= Am seidenen Faden =

Am seidenen Faden may refer to:

- By a Silken Thread (Am seidenen Faden), a 1938 German drama film
- Am seidenen Faden (album), a 2013 album by Tim Bendzko
