= Chris Ayer =

American singer-songwriter

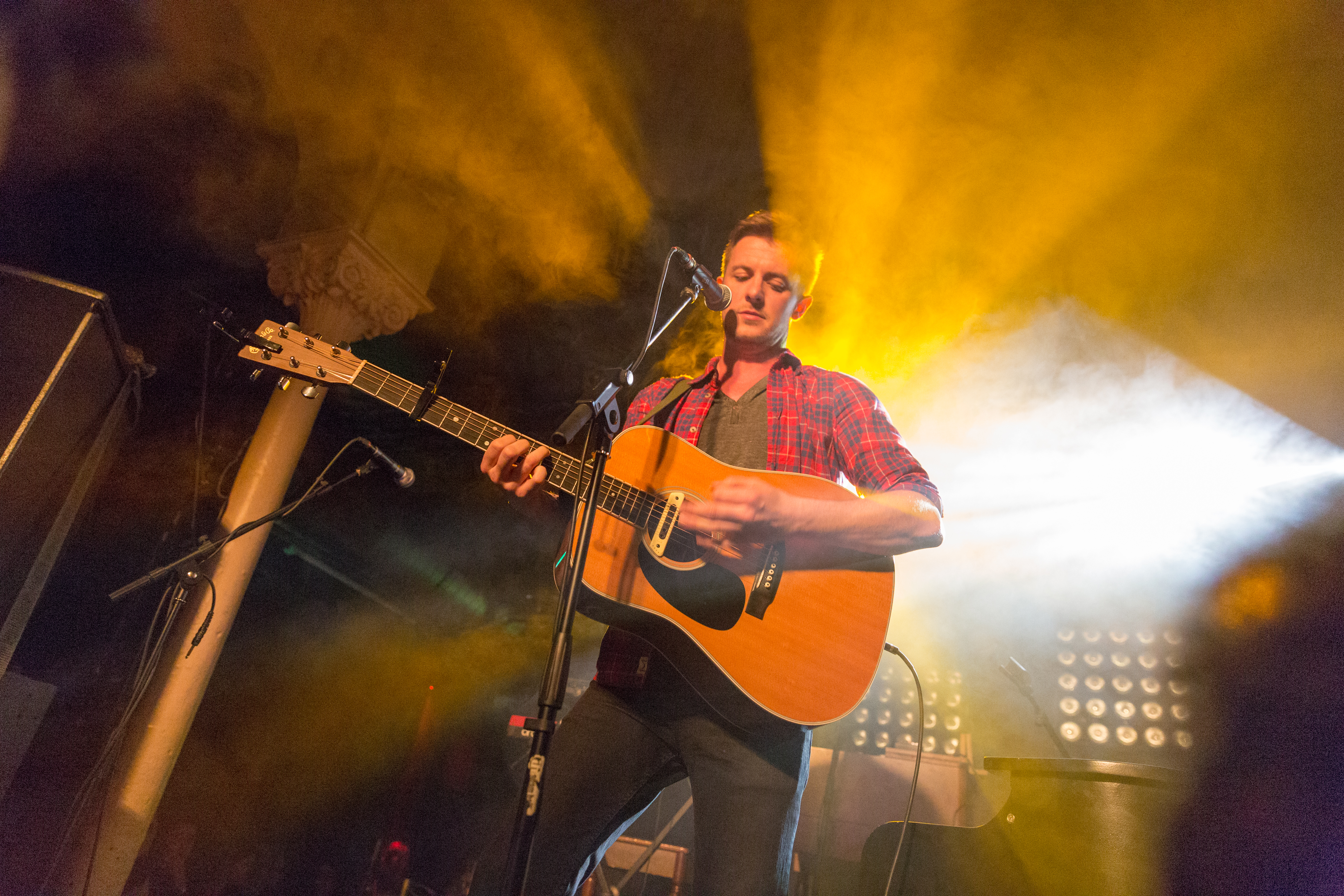
- Ayer performing in April 2016

Background information
- Born: January 7, 1984 (age 42); McLean, Virginia, U.S.
- Origin: Stanford, California, U.S.
- Genres: Blues rock; pop rock; folk pop
- Occupations: Singer-songwriter; musician; producer
- Instruments: Vocals; guitar
- Website: chrisayermusic.com

Chris Ayer (born January 7, 1984) is an American singer-songwriter, musician, and producer based in Los Angeles. His music incorporates elements of folk pop, pop rock, electropop, and Americana. As a songwriter, he co-wrote "Lay Your Worry Down" for Milow featuring Matt Simons, which has accumulated over 9 million streams on Spotify.

== Early life and education ==
Ayer was born in McLean, Virginia, and attended The Potomac School from kindergarten through twelfth grade. He graduated from Stanford University, where he studied philosophy and music. While at Stanford, Ayer sang with the Stanford Mendicants, an all-male a cappella group. He began playing guitar and writing songs at age 18.

== Career ==
=== Early career (2003–2012) ===
Ayer self-released his debut EP, Static, in June 2003 while still at Stanford. After graduating, he spent a year performing in the San Francisco Bay Area before moving to Brooklyn in 2005. He released a second EP, New Songs, in August 2005, which received national radio airplay. His first full-length album, This Is the Place, was recorded in Nashville and released in November 2006. The album was produced by Jason Gantt, who had previously worked with the Chieftains, Brooks & Dunn, Tim McGraw, and Faith Hill. The album included the song "Evaporate", which won in the folk category of the 2006 John Lennon Songwriting Contest. In 2006, he also toured the United Kingdom twice as a live guitarist and singer with MC Lars.

Ayer released Live Sessions and the Center Ring EP in 2007, followed by the full-length album Don't Go Back to Sleep in 2009, which he co-produced with Grammy-winning producer Will Hensley.

=== European breakthrough and The Noise (2013–2016) ===
In January 2013, Ayer signed with Sony Music in the United Kingdom and Europe, and subsequently released material through Sony Europe, Epic Amsterdam, and [PIAS] Holland. His album The Noise, released in March 2013, reached number six on the iTunes Singer-Songwriter chart. He toured the Netherlands with fellow musician Matt Simons in April 2013, and then toured in Switzerland and Italy for the rest of the spring.

=== 2017–present ===
In June 2017, Ayer performed at the Pinkpop Festival in Landgraaf, Netherlands, appearing alongside acts such as Green Day, System of a Down, and Martin Garrix. That same year, he supported Matt Simons before a crowd of 5,500 at AFAS Live in Amsterdam.

His song "Heavy" won the 16th Independent Music Award for Best Adult Contemporary Song in 2018.

In 2018, Ayer began exploring electropop production, collaborating with producer Keith Varon and songwriter Jessica Vaughn (known as LACES). He released the LP Endless Wonder in October 2019.

As a songwriter, Ayer co-wrote "Lay Your Worry Down" with Milow and Matt Simons, released in 2018. The track, distributed by Sony Music Entertainment Netherlands, has accumulated over 9 million streams on Spotify. Ayer has also developed a catalog of over 200 licensable tracks used across broadcast, streaming, and advertising campaigns, with placements in productions by Paramount, NBCUniversal, CBS, Showtime, and during Super Bowl LVIII.

== Discography ==
=== Albums/EPs ===
Date of Release	Title	Label
March 19, 2013	The Noise	Self Released
August 18, 2009	Don't Go Back to Sleep	Another Record Company
November 7, 2006	This Is The Place	Self Released
August 2005	New Songs	Self Released
June 2003	Static (EP)	Self Released
