= Adoro =

Adoro may refer to:

- Marcus Adoro (born 1971)
- Adoro (goddess), an Igbo people deity

== Music ==
- Adoro (band), German opera music project
- Adoro, an album by Franck Pourcel and orchestra, 1970
- Adoro (Plácido Domingo album), 1990
- Adoro, an album by Adoro
- "Adoro" (song), a 1967 song by Armando Manzanero
