= Immer noch Mensch =

Studio album by Tim Bendzko
- Released: 21 October 2016
- Length: 38:54
- Label: Columbia; Sony Music
- Producer: Tim Bendzko; Studio Hitzig

Tim Bendzko chronology
Am seidenen Faden (2013)	Immer noch Mensch (2016)	Filter (2019)

Immer noch Mensch (German: Still Human) is the third studio album by German recording artist Tim Bendzko, released by Sony Music Columbia on 21 October 2016 in German-speaking Europe.

== Critical reception ==
Professional ratings
Review scores
Source	Rating
laut.de	2/5 stars

laut.de editor Jeremias Heppeler rated the album two stars out of five. He found that "nothing sticks with Immer noch Mensch. Really nothing. Niente. This record knows no changes of tempo, no moments of surprise and, with very few exceptions, it bobs along in a soporific manner. There is no question that it will find its audience." Deutsche Presse-Agentur wrote: "With the new album Bendzko continues his path. And yet dares to try new things. For the first time he is a songwriter, musician and producer at the same time. When he played the new songs for the first time, he shed a few beads of sweat. The singer also tries his hand at music, eschewing electronic beats and opting for something handmade. The result is a classic Bendzko: warm German pop without a false bottom."

== Chart performance ==
Immer noch Mensch became Bendzko's second consecutive studio album to debut at number one on the German Albums Chart. In 2017, it was eventually certified Gold by the Bundesverband Musikindustrie (BVMI) for sales in excess of 100,000 copies.

== Track listing ==
All tracks written by Tim Bendzko.

Immer noch Mensch track listing
No.	Title	Producer(s)	Length
1.	"Beste Version"	Tim Bendzko; Studio Hitzig	4:01
2.	"Keine Maschine"	Bendzko; Studio Hitzig; Philipp Schwär^{[a]}	3:17
3.	"Reparieren"	Bendzko; Studio Hitzig	3:42
4.	"Hinter dem Meer"	Bendzko; Studio Hitzig	4:08
5.	"Immer noch Mensch"	Bendzko; Studio Hitzig	3:02
6.	"Wie wir sind"	Bendzko; Studio Hitzig; Peter Keller^{[a]}	4:10
7.	"Leichtsinn"	Bendzko; Studio Hitzig	3:13
8.	"Sternenstaub"	Bendzko; Studio Hitzig	3:19
9.	"Winter"	Bendzko; Studio Hitzig	2:22
10.	"Nicht das Ende"	Bendzko; Studio Hitzig	3:37
11.	"Warum ich Lieder singe"	Bendzko; Studio Hitzig	3:57
Total length:			38:54

Notes

- ^{^[a]} signifies a co-producer

== Charts ==
=== Weekly charts ===
Weekly chart performance for Immer noch Mensch
Chart (2016)	Peak position
Austrian Albums (Ö3 Austria)	13
German Albums (Offizielle Top 100)	1
Swiss Albums (Schweizer Hitparade)	10

=== Year-end charts ===
Year-end chart performance for Immer noch Mensch
Chart (2016)	Rank
German Albums (Offizielle Top 100)	43

== Certifications ==
Certifications for Immer noch Mensch
Region	Certification	Certified units/sales
Germany (BVMI)	Gold	100,000^{‡}
^{‡} Sales+streaming figures based on certification alone.

== Release history ==
Immer noch Mensch release history
Region	Date	Format	Label	Ref.
Various	21 October 2016	Digital download; CD	Sony Music Columbia	
