= Milow discography =

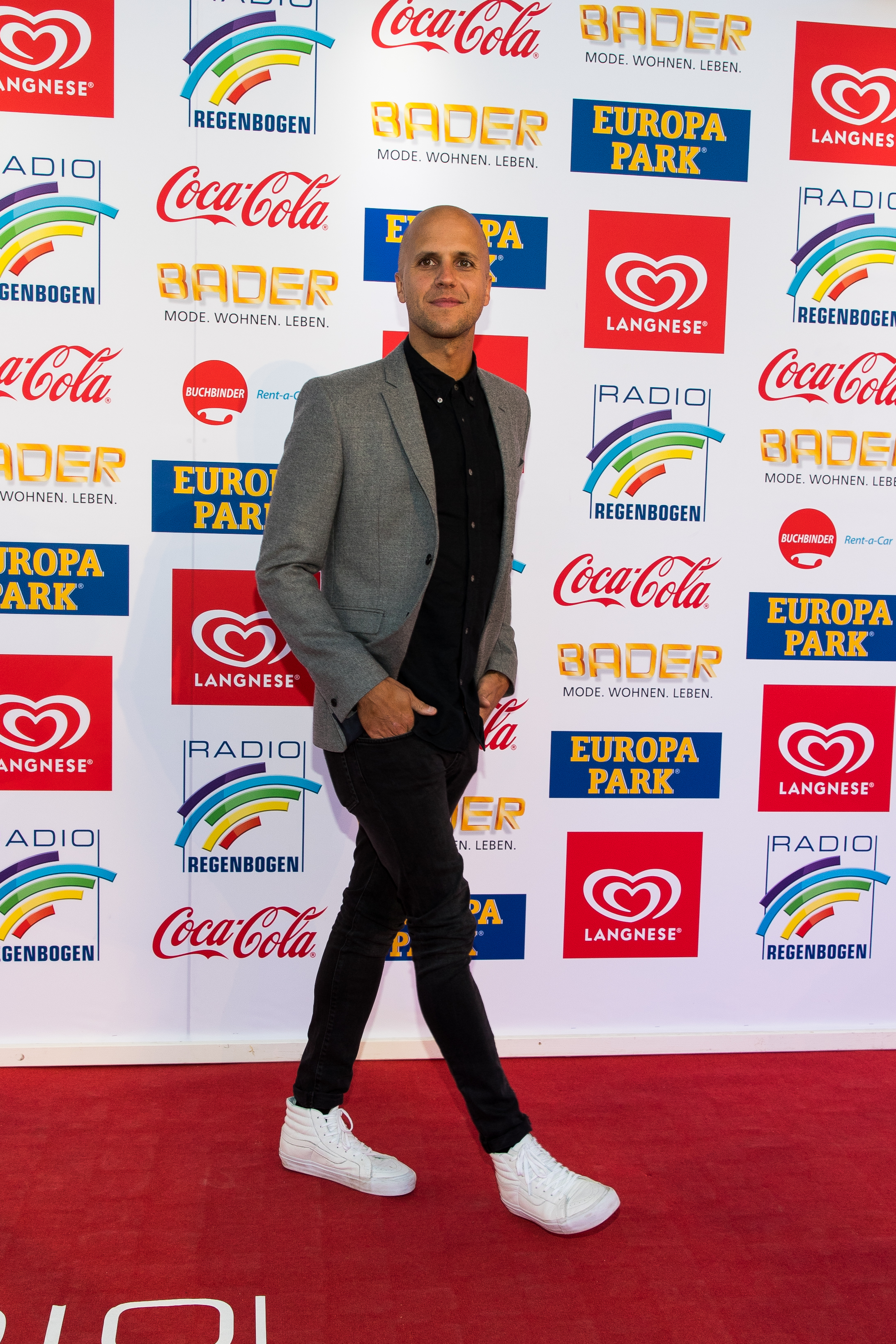
- Milow during the 2017 Radio Regenbogen Awards
- Studio albums: 9
- EPs: 1
- Live albums: 2

This article is a list of works by Belgian musician Jonathan Ivo Gilles Vandenbroeck, better known by his stage name Milow.

== Albums ==
=== Studio albums ===
List of albums, with selected chart positions, sales figures and certifications
Title	Album details	Peak chart positions										Certifications
Title	Album details	BEL	NLD	GER	AUT	SWI	SWE	DEN	FRA	SPA	CAN	Certifications
The Bigger Picture	Released: 20 January 2006; Label: Homerun, Munich; Format: CD, digital download	10	78	—	—	—	—	—	—	—	—	BEA: Gold
Coming of Age	Released: 1 February 2008; Label: Homerun, Munich; Format: CD, digital download	1	17	—	—	—	—	—	—	—	—	BEA: Gold
Milow	Released: 27 March 2009; Label: Homerun, Munich; Format: CD, digital download	26	17	3	10	4	38	28	17	32	19	BVMI: Platinum; IFPI AUT: Gold; IFPI SWI: Platinum
North and South	Released: 1 April 2011; Label: Homerun, Island; Format: CD, digital download	5	3	4	12	5	—	—	35	—	83	BEA: Platinum; BVMI: Gold; IFPI AUT: Gold
Silver Linings	Released: 28 March 2014; Label: Homerun, Island; Format: CD, digital download	1	—	7	22	12	—	—	—	—	—	
Modern Heart	Released: 13 May 2016; Label: Homerun, Island; Format: CD, digital download	2	19	9	37	31	—	—	—	—	—	
Lean Into Me	Released: 24 May 2019; Label: Homerun, Island; Format: CD, digital download	5	76	11	24	15	—	—	—	—	—	
Nice to Meet You	Released: 20 May 2022; Label: Homerun, Island; Format: CD, digital download	7	69	31	—	38	—	—	—	—	—	
Boy Made Out of Stars	Released: 21 February 2025; Label: Homerun, Island; Format: CD, digital download	5	—	75	—	42	—	—	—	—	—	
"—" denotes a recording that did not chart or was not released in that territory.

=== Live albums ===
List of albums, with selected chart positions, sales figures and certifications
Title	Album details	Peak chart positions				
Title	Album details	BEL	NLD	AUT	SWI	FRA
Maybe Next Year	Released: 2 October 2010; Label: Homerun, Munich; Format: CD, digital download	7	21	66	87	180
From North to South	Released: 19 October 2012; Label: Homerun, Island; Format: CD, digital download	9	40	—	—	—
Dream So Big Eyes Are Wide	Released: 17 April 2020; Label: Homerun, Island; Format: CD, digital download	28	—	—	—	—

== EPs ==
List of EPs
Title	EP details
Born in the Eighties	Released: 10 July 2012; Label: Homerun, Island; Format: Digital download

== Singles ==
Year	Title	Chart positions										Certifications	Album
Year	Title	BEL	NLD	GER	AUT	SWI	SWE	FRA	ITA	SPA	SLK	Certifications	Album
2005	"More Familiar"	—	—	—	—	—	—	—	—	—	—		Milow (DE, AT, CH)
2005	"One of It"	—	64	—	—	—	—	—	—	—	—		Milow (DE, AT, CH)
2006	"Excuse to Try"	—	—	—	—	—	—	—	—	—	—		Milow (DE, AT, CH)
2006	"Landslide"	—	—	—	—	—	—	—	—	—	—		The Bigger Picture
2006	"You Don't Know"	3	8	15	21	8	—	—	—	—	93		The Bigger Picture
2007	"Dreamers and Renegades"	24	—	—	—	—	—	—	—	—	—		The Bigger Picture
2008	"The Ride"	41	—	—	—	—	—	—	—	—	—		Coming of Age / Milow (GER, AT, CH)
2009	"Ayo Technology"	1	1	2	2	1	1	8	5	2	11		Milow
2010	"Out of My Hands" (featuring Marit Larsen)	55	—	19	44	21	—	—	—	—	—		Milow
2010	"Never Gonna Stop"	2	—	—	—	—	—	—	—	—	—		North and South
2011	"You and Me (In My Pocket)"	6	24	3	6	10	—	67	—	—	—		North and South
2011	"Little in the Middle"	24	87	28	11	51	—	—	—	—	—		North and South
2011	"She Might She Might"	43	—	—	—	—	—	—	—	—	—		North and South
2012	"Building Bridges"	62	—	—	—	—	—	—	—	—	—		North and South
2014	"We Must Be Crazy"	52	—	34	23	69	—	—	—	—	—		Silver Linings
2014	"Against the Tide"	—	—	—	74	—	—	—	—	—	—		Silver Linings
2016	"Howling at the Moon"	3	64	18	15	71	—	—	—	—	44	NVPI: Gold; IFPI AUT: Gold	Modern Heart
2016	"No No No"	24	—	—	—	—	—	—	—	—	—		Modern Heart
2017	"Lonely One"	52	—	—	—	—	—	—	—	—	—		Modern Heart
2017	"Summer Days" (featuring Sebastián Yatra)	20	—	—	—	—	—	—	—	—	—		Non-album singles
2017	"Don't Turn Around"	51	—	—	—	—	—	—	—	—	—		Non-album singles
2018	"Lay Your Worry Down" (featuring Matt Simons)	28	—	—	—	—	—	—	—	—	—		Lean Into Me
2019	"Sleeping Bag" (live) (featuring Ilse DeLange)	47	—	—	—	—	—	—	—	—	—		Lean Into Me
2019	"Help"	49	—	—	—	—	—	—	—	—	—		Lean Into Me
2019	"Greatest Expectations"	56	—	—	—	—	—	—	—	—	—		Lean Into Me
2019	"Nobody Needs You Like I Do"	23	—	—	—	—	—	—	—	—	—		Lean Into Me
2020	"Whatever It Takes"	—	—	—	—	—	—	—	—	—	—	IFPI AUT: Gold	Nice to Meet You
2020	"First Day of My Life"	28	—	—	—	—	—	—	—	—	—		Nice to Meet You
2021	"ASAP"	23	—	—	—	—	—	—	—	—	—		Nice to Meet You
2021	"DeLorean"	34	—	—	—	—	—	—	—	—	—		Nice to Meet You
2021	"Christmas Is Finally Here"	20	83	—	—	—	—	—	—	—	—		Non-album singles
2022	"How Love Works"	30	—	—	—	—	—	—	—	—	—		Non-album singles
2022	"Until the Sun Comes Up" (featuring Skip Marley)	28	—	—	—	—	—	—	—	—	—		Non-album singles
2025	"House on Fire" (with Linda Elys)	41	—	—	—	—	—	—	—	—	—		Non-album singles
2026	"Forever Young" (with DJ Licious)	8	—	—	—	—	—	—	—	—	—		Non-album singles
"—" denotes a single that did not chart or was not released in that territory.
