= April (Tim Bendzko album) =

Studio album by Tim Bendzko
- Released: 31 March 2023
- Length: 38:56
- Label: Jive
- Producer: Truva

Tim Bendzko chronology
Filter (2019)	April (2023)

April is the fifth studio album by German recording artist Tim Bendzko. It was released by Jive Records on 31 March 2023. Bendzko reteamed with Timothy Auld and Benedikt Schöller from production duo Truva to work on the majority on the album, having previously worked with them on his previous Filter (2019). April debuted and peaked at number 13 on the German Albums Chart, becoming his lowest-charting album yet.

== Critical reception ==
Professional ratings
Review scores
Source	Rating
laut.de	2/5 stars

laut.de editor Philipp Kause rated the album two stars out of five. He found that "more could have been made of the album's melodic bliss and the clear, stringent, succinctly told stories if Bendzko had invested more time and quality awareness in some rhymes and beats. April has entertaining approaches.."

== Track listing ==
All tracks produced by Truva.

April track listing
No.	Title	Lyrics	Music	Length
1.	"April"	Tim Bendzko; Robin Haels	Bendzko; Timothy Auld; Benedikt Schöller	2:02
2.	"Du Du Du"	Bendzko; Olaf Powers	Bendzko; Powers	2:39
3.	"Dieses Mal"	Bendzko; Jens Schneider; Jules Kalmbacher; Tom Hengelbrock	Bendzko; Schneider; Kalmbacher; Hengelbrock	2:36
4.	"Allein in Paris"	Bendzko; Michael Heinrich Lenk	Bendzko; Lenk; Auld; Schöller	2:31
5.	"Kein Problem"	Bendzko; Powers	Bendzko; Powers	2:58
6.	"Irgendwas mit Liebe"	Bendzko	Bendzko; Auld; Schöller	2:25
7.	"Geisterjagd"	Bendzko; Peter Stanowsky	Bendzko; Stanowsky; Auld; Schöller	2:30
8.	"Wer rettet die Welt für mich"	Bendzko; Peter Stanowsky	Bendzko; Stanowsky; Auld; Schöller	2:57
9.	"Das Glück kommt zurück"	Bendzko; Peter Stanowsky	Bendzko; Stanowsky; Auld; Schöller	2:53
10.	"Das Leben wieder lieben"	Bendzko; Toni Mudrack	Tim Bendzko; Mudrack; Auld; Schöller; Sahm	2:44
11.	"Zu viel"	Bendzko	Bendzko; Auld; Schöller	2:12
12.	"Magneten"	Bendzko	Bendzko; Auld; Schöller	2:26
13.	"Phantomschmerz"	Bendzko	Bendzko; Lucry; Suena	2:51
14.	"Parallelwelt"	Bendzko	Bendzko; Auld; Schöller	2:50
15.	"Für Dich"	Bendzko; Johannes Bruhns; Markus Winter	Bendzko; Bruhns; Winter; Auld; Schöller	2:14
Total length:				38:56

== Charts ==
Weekly chart performance for April
Chart (2023)	Peak position
German Albums (Offizielle Top 100)	13

== Release history ==
April release history
Region	Date	Format	Label	Ref.
Various	21 March 2023	Digital download; CD	Jive Records; Sony Music	
