= Tom Vanstiphout =

Belgian musician

- Born: 29 April 1975 (age 51); Kapellen, Belgium
- Genres: Pop
- Years active: 1995–present
- Labels: Dreamteam, LC Music
- Website: http://www.tomvanstiphout.be/ (in Dutch)

Tom Vanstiphout (born 29 April 1975) is a Belgian musician who has made four solo albums and has toured with Clouseau, Jan Leyers and Milow.

Vanstiphout was born in Kapellen. He started his musical career at the age of 13 with M-pire, a band that performed only twice. His second band was Secret System. With this band he released one single 'This Time' and played many concerts in the area of Antwerp, o.a. a supporting act for De Kreuners, The Radios and Ashbury Faith. The other band members of Secret System were Filip Moens, Jan Van Sichem, Johan Swinnen, Filip Standaert and Peter Moens. After Secret System Tom played in Morbid Elly, a short-lived band with Leslie Van Windekens and again Filip Moens, which only produced one six song demo tape with cover art by Gert Bettens. He then became a professional musician as a live band member for a number of Belgian artists like Jan Leyers, Clouseau or Milow. He also regularly played with De Laatste Showband in a daily talkshow on Eén.

In his solowork, he is mainly influenced by James Taylor. He made his first album, Motion, in 2004, which landed him a number of concerts, a.o. on Folk Dranouter. In 2009, he released a second album, Working Man. In 2013, he released Little Beams of Light and in December 2015 he released Playing Guitar helps.

He is often considered one of Belgium's finest musicians, both as a studio musician and as a live performer. In 2009, he was one of the four nominees for Best Musician at the MIA's, the Belgian Music Industry Awards.

Since 2019, he performs live and on some recordings with Bryan Ferry and Roxy Music, after Bryan Ferry heard him playing during the Night of the Proms.

== Discography ==
- 2004: Motion (full CD)
- 2009: Working Man (full CD)
- 2013: Little Beam of Lights (full CD)
- 2015: Playing Guitar Helps (full CD)
- 2020: Duet for One – The Solo Sessions (full CD)
- 2021: Belval (EP)

=== Collaborated ===
- 2002: neeka, Candy Comfort
- 2008: Milow, Coming of Age
