= Am seidenen Faden (album) =

Studio album by Tim Bendzko
- Released: 24 May 2013
- Length: 55:02
- Labels: Columbia; Sony Music
- Producers: Swen Meyer; Christian "Crada" Kalla

Tim Bendzko chronology
Wenn Worte meine Sprache wären (2011)	Am seidenen Faden (2013)	Immer noch Mensch (2016)

Am seidenen Faden (German: By a Silken Thread) is the second studio album by German recording artist Tim Bendzko, released by Sony Music Columbia on 24 May 2013 in German-speaking Europe. Bendzko re-teamed with frequent collaborator music producer Swen Meyer to work on the album and also consulted Christian "Crada" Kalla to provide additional production on the songs. Am seidenen Faden debuted and peaked at number one on the German Albums Chart, becoming Bendzko's first album to do so, and was certified 2× Platinum by the Bundesverband Musikindustrie (BVMI) for sales in excess of 400,000 copies.

== Critical reception ==
Professional ratings
Review scores
Source	Rating
laut.de	2/5 stars

laut.de editor Artur Schulz rated the album two stars out of five. He found that "on his second album, Bendzko comes dangerously close to conventional Schlager niceness, but always has enough fuel in the tank to not get stuck there. The banks of the well-kept chansons sometimes come into view, but remain inaccessible. Am Seidenen Faden is certainly suitable as a saving album for unhappily in love summer holidays." Deutsche Presse-Agentur wrote that "the whiz kid from 2011 once again shows catchy potential in his new songs in a jazzy pop-soul style. As with "Nur noch kurz die Welt retten" from his debut album or the winning title of the Bundesvision Song Contest "Wenn Worte meine Sprache wären", the album impresses with catchy melodies [...] You can't necessarily tell that the songs that have now been released were created from a single source and in the same phase of life together with the songs from the previous album. The new pieces on the double album are a little less soft, but just as down-to-earth."

== Chart performance ==
Am seidenen Faden debuted at number one on the German Albums Chart, becoming Bendzko's first album to do so. In 2016, it was eventually certified double platinum by the Bundesverband Musikindustrie (BVMI) for sales in excess of 400,000 copies. In Austria and Switzerland, the album marked his first top ten entry. It peaked at number four and number seven, respectively.

== Track listing ==
Am seidenen Faden – Standard edition
No.	Title	Lyrics	Music	Producer(s)	Length
1.	"Ich steh nicht mehr still"	Tim Bendzko	Bendzko; Christian "Crada" Kalla; Camille Purcell	Swen Meyer	4:11
2.	"Am seidenen Faden"	Bendzko	Bendzko	Meyer	3:59
3.	"Ohne zurück zu sehen"	Bendzko	Bendzko; Kalla; Mirko Schaffer; Dirk Reichardt	Meyer	3:37
4.	"Auch wenn es gelogen ist"	Bendzko	Bendzko	Meyer	3:59
5.	"Vergessen ist so leicht"	Bendzko	Bendzko; Daniel Hassbecker	Meyer	4:22
6.	"Die Geier kreisen schon"	Bendzko	Bendzko; Aiko Rohd	Meyer	3:14
7.	"Durch die Nacht"	Bendzko	Bendzko	Meyer	4:23
8.	"Es geht wieder vorbei"	Bendzko	Bendzko; Kalla	Meyer	3:57
9.	"Nur einen Herzschlag"	Bendzko	Bendzko; Hassbecker; Rohd	Meyer	3:41
10.	"Ich will zu Dir"	Bendzko	Bendzko	Meyer	4:06
11.	"Programmiert"	Bendzko	Bendzko	Meyer	3:20
12.	"Leicht sein"	Bendzko	Bendzko; Rohd	Meyer	3:26
13.	"Keine Zeit"	Bendzko	Bendzko	Meyer	3:19
14.	"Wo sollen wir nur hin"	Bendzko	Bendzko; Rohd	Meyer	4:48
15.	"Alles was Du wissen musst"	Bendzko	Bendzko; Rohd	Meyer	3:59

Am seidenen Faden – Unter die Haut version – CD 2
No.	Title	Lyrics	Music	Producer(s)	Length
1.	"Mein Leben ist dein Leben"	Bendzko	Rohd	Rohd	3:21
2.	"Unter die Haut" (featuring Cassandra Steen)	Bendzko; Steen	Bendzko; Steen	Kalla	3:57
3.	"Zum Greifen nah"	Bendzko	Bendzko	Kalla	3:30
4.	"Noch nie" (featuring Aitzi)	Bendzko; Aitziber Cofre	Bendzko; Kalla	Kalla	4:20
5.	"Nach Gold gegraben"	Bendzko	Bendzko; Rohd	Rohd	5:20
6.	"Give a Little" (featuring Rea Garvey)	Bendzko; Garvey	Bendzko; Garvey; Kalla	Kalla	3:30
7.	"Vergiss es" (featuring Chima)	Bendzko; Chima Onyele	Bendzko; Kalla; Daniel Russ	Kalla; Russ^{[a]}	3:50
8.	"Bei dir sein" (featuring Lary)	Bendzko; Larissa Herden	Bendzko; Kalla; Sway Clarke; Fernandez	Kalla	3:01
9.	"Albtraum"	Bendzko	Bendzko; Kalla	Kalla	3:18
10.	"Ich halte dich fest"	Bendzko	Bendzko; Kalla; Michael Vajna	Kalla	3:44
11.	"Um jeden Preis" (featuring Xavas)	Bendzko; Kool Savas; Xavier Naidoo	Bendzko; Kalla; Naidoo; Alex Knolle	Kalla	3:44
12.	"Wer weiss was uns erwarten wird"	Bendzko	Bendzko	Kalla	3:29

Notes

- ^{^[a]} signifies a co-producer

== Charts ==
=== Weekly charts ===
Weekly chart performance for Am seidenen Faden
Chart (2013)	Peak position
Austrian Albums (Ö3 Austria)	4
German Albums (Offizielle Top 100)	1
Swiss Albums (Schweizer Hitparade)	7

=== Year-end charts ===
2013 year-end chart performance for Am seidenen Faden
Chart (2013)	Rank
German Albums (Offizielle Top 100)	14

2014 year-end chart performance for Am seidenen Faden
Chart (2014)	Rank
German Albums (Offizielle Top 100)	90

== Certifications ==
Certifications for Am seidenen Faden
Region	Certification	Certified units/sales
Germany (BVMI)	2× Platinum	400,000^{‡}
^{‡} Sales+streaming figures based on certification alone.

== Release history ==
Wenn Worte meine Sprache release history
Region	Date	Edition(s)	Format	Label	Ref.
Various	24 May 2013	Standard; deluxe	Digital download; CD	Columbia Records; Sony Music	
Various	6 December 2013	Unter die Haut version	Digital download; CD	Columbia Records; Sony Music	
