= Tim Bendzko =

German singer-songwriter

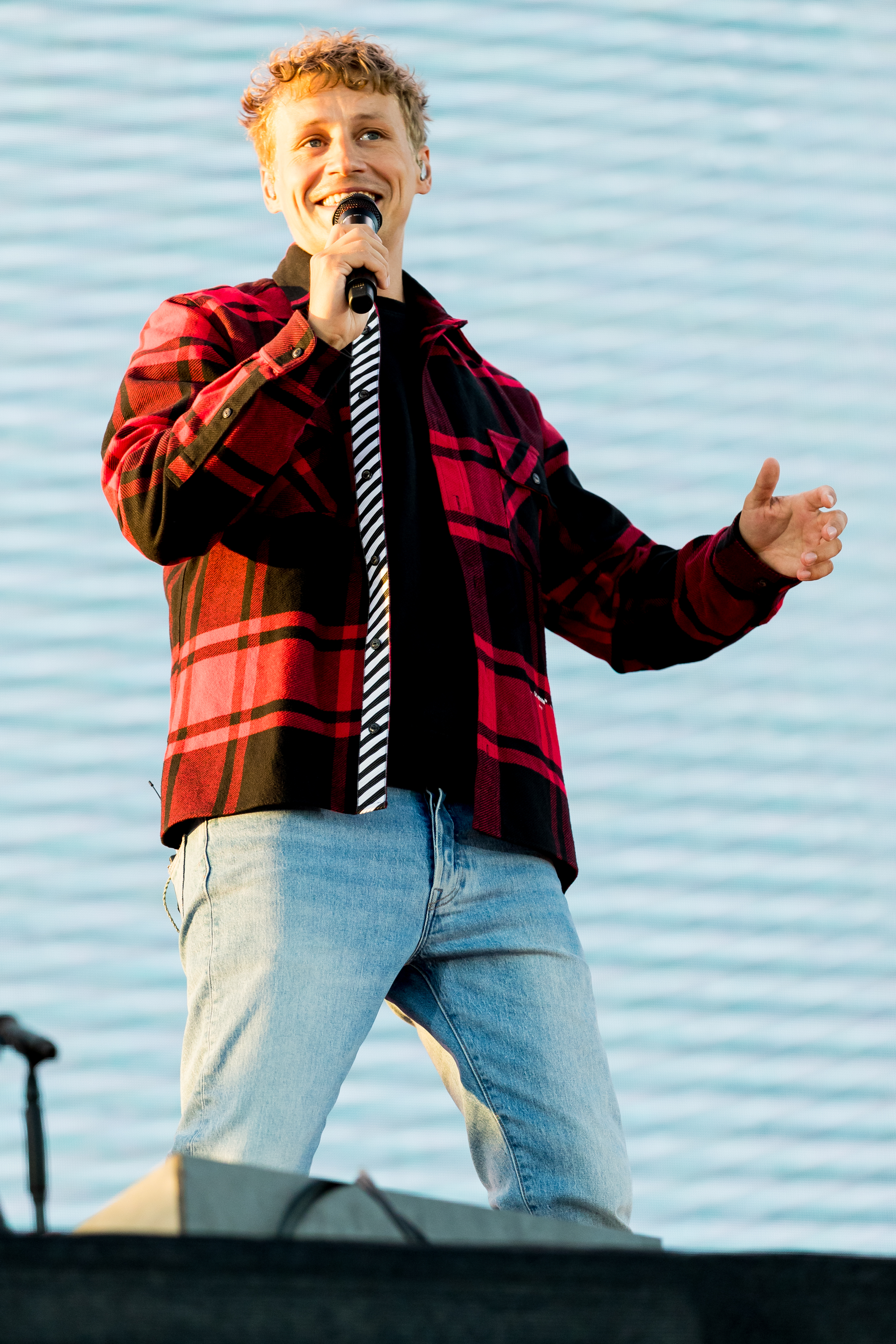
- Bendzko in 2020

Background information
- Born: 9 April 1985 (age 40); East Berlin, East Germany
- Genres: Pop
- Labels: Sony Music
- Website: www.timbendzko.de

Tim Bendzko (born 9 April 1985) is a German singer-songwriter. He achieved nationwide recognition with his song "Nur noch kurz die Welt retten" and becoming the winner of the 2011 Bundesvision Song Contest.

== Career ==
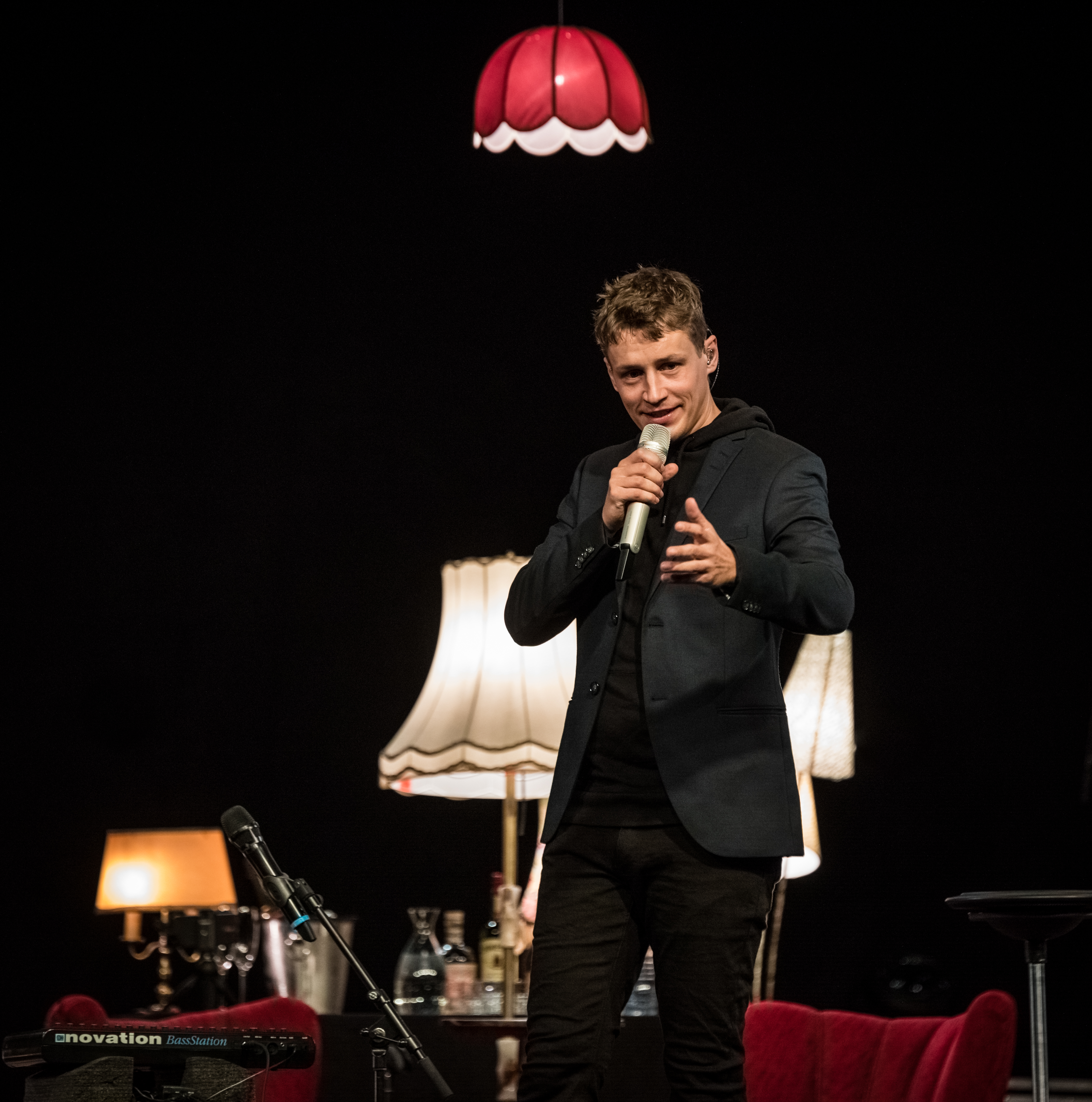
Tim Bendzko live at Leverkusener Jazztage 2017

Bendzko grew up in the Köpenick region of Berlin. As a teenager, he attended a sport gymnasium and played with the FC Union Berlin club football up to the "B" age level, around 16. His musical career began with guitar lessons, which he decided to start taking when he was 11 or 12 years old. At age 16, he wrote his first songs. After taking his Abitur, he studied Protestant Theology and non-Christian religions at the Free University of Berlin. He ended his studies after 5 semesters without getting a degree. He then worked temporarily as an auctioneer in the car trade.

In 2009, he registered for the talent competition Söhne gesucht of Söhne Mannheims. As a winner of the talent competition, he performed in the summer of 2009 before 20,000 spectators at the Berlin Waldbühne, one of Europe's largest concert venues. Then he devoted himself entirely to his music. He received a recording contract with Sony Music and performed as an opening act for Silly on their 2010 tour.

On 17 June 2011, he released his debut album Wenn Worte meine Sprache wären ("If words were my language"), from which the single Nur noch kurz die Welt retten ("Just quickly save the world") was released on 27 May 2011. The album reached number four in the German charts and the single number two. The single, written by Tim Bendzko, Mo Brandis and Simon Triebel, was certified 3× Gold in Germany for sales of more than 450,000 copies. It was also awarded Platinum status in Switzerland and Gold in Austria. The music video was produced by Hagen Decker in Los Angeles. The album, which sold over 500,000 copies in Germany alone, was certified 5× Gold in Germany, Platinum in Switzerland and Gold in Austria.

Bendzko performed as the opening act in Cologne and Leipzig on Elton John's tour of Germany, as well as being the support act for Joe Cocker during his Hard Knocks tour. On 29 September 2011, he came back to his hometown of Berlin for the Bundesvision Song Contest 2011 with the title track of his Album, Wenn Worte meine Sprache wären and won the competition. On 10 November 2011 he won the newcomer Bambi award.

Tim was one of the three coaches in the first season of the German version of The Voice Kids, which aired in 2013.

== Discography ==
=== Studio albums ===
List of albums, with selected chart positions, sales figures and certifications
Title	Album details	Peak chart positions			Certifications
Title	Album details	GER	AUT	SWI	Certifications
Wenn Worte meine Sprache wären	Released: 17 June 2011; Label: Sony Music; Format: CD, digital download	4	11	13	BVMI: 5× Gold; IFPI AUT: Gold; IFPI SWI: Gold
Am seidenen Faden	Released: 24 May 2013; Label: Sony Music; Format: CD, digital download	1	4	7	BVMI: 2× Platinum
Immer noch Mensch	Released: 21 October 2016; Label: Columbia; Format: CD, digital download	1	13	10	BVMI: Gold
Filter	Released: 18 October 2019; Label: Jive, Sony Music; Format: CD, digital download	3	18	26	
April	Released: 31 March 2023; Label: Jive, Sony Music; Format: CD, digital download	13	—	—	

=== Singles ===
Title	Year	Peak chart positions			Certifications	Album
Title	Year	GER	AUT	SWI	Certifications	Album
"Nur noch kurz die Welt retten"	2011	2	8	4	BVMI: 3× Gold; IFPI AUT: Platinum; IFPI SWI: Platinum	Wenn Worte meine Sprache wären
"Wenn Worte meine Sprache wären"	2011	5	15	33	BVMI: Gold	Wenn Worte meine Sprache wären
"Ich laufe"	2012	47	53	—		Wenn Worte meine Sprache wären
"Sag einfach Ja"	2012	42	—	—		Wenn Worte meine Sprache wären
"Am seidenen Faden"	2013	11	26	65		Am seidenen Faden
"Programmiert"	2013	32	—	—		Am seidenen Faden
"Unter die Haut" (featuring Cassandra Steen)	2013	16	49	59		Am seidenen Faden – Unter die Haut
"Laut und bunt"	2015	—	—	—		Shaun the Sheep Movie Soundtrack
"Keine Maschine"	2016	14	71	59	BVMI: Gold	Immer noch Mensch
"Hoch"	2019	10	40	—	BVMI: Gold; IFPI AUT: Platinum	Filter
"Nur wegen dir"	2019	—	—	—		Filter
