= Modern Heart (Milow album) =

Studio album by Milow
- Released: May 13, 2016
- Recorded: 2016
- Genre: Pop; R&B; tropical house
- Length: 51:32
- Label: Homerun; Island
- Producer: Joe Chiccarelli; Marius de Vries; Rufus Dipper; Michael Geldreich; Brian Kennedy; Luca Presti

Milow chronology
Silver Linings (2014)	Modern Heart (2016)	Lean Into Me (2019)

Singles from Modern Heart
- 1. "Howling at the Moon" Released: 8 April 2016

Modern Heart is the fifth studio album by Belgian recording artist Milow, released by Homerun Records and Island Records on May 13, 2016.

== Track listing ==
No.	Title	Writer(s)	Producer(s)	Length
1.	"Waiting Around for Love"	Milow; Brian Kennedy; James Fauntleroy	Marius de Vries	4:16
2.	"Lonely One"	Milow; Jonathan Rice; Presti	Joe Chiccarelli; Presti	3:23
3.	"Howling at the Moon"	Milow; Presti; Tammy Infusino	Rufus Dipper	3:05
4.	"The Fast Lane"	Milow; Kennedy; Rice	Chiccarelli; Kennedy	3:41
5.	"Love Like That Is Easy"	Milow; Jason Boesel; Kennedy; Fauntleroy; Rice	Chiccarelli	3:23
6.	"No No No"	Milow; Walton Gagel; Rice; Joe Keefe	Michael Geldreich	3:10
7.	"Running Blind"	Milow; Kennedy; Fauntleroy	Marius de Vries	4:14
8.	"Really Rich"	Milow; Presti	Chiccarelli	4:01
9.	"Way Up High"	Milow; Presti	Marius de Vries	5:57

== Charts ==
=== Weekly charts ===
Chart (2016)	Peak position
Austrian Albums (Ö3 Austria)	37
Belgian Albums (Ultratop Flanders)	2
Belgian Albums (Ultratop Wallonia)	29
Dutch Albums (Album Top 100)	19
German Albums (Offizielle Top 100)	9
Swiss Albums (Schweizer Hitparade)	31

=== Year-end charts ===
Chart (2016)	Position
Belgian Albums (Ultratop Flanders)	55

== Release history ==
List of release dates, showing region, formats and label
Region	Date	Format	Label
Austria	May 13, 2016	Digital download, CD	Homerun, Island
Belgium	May 13, 2016	Digital download, CD	Homerun, Island
Germany	May 13, 2016	Digital download, CD	Homerun, Island
Netherlands	May 13, 2016	Digital download, CD	Homerun, Island
Switzerland	May 13, 2016	Digital download, CD	Homerun, Island
