= Wenn Worte meine Sprache wären =

Studio album by Tim Bendzko
- Released: 17 June 2011
- Length: 46:15
- Label: Columbia; Sony Music
- Producer: Swen Meyer

Tim Bendzko chronology
Wenn Worte meine Sprache wären (2011)	Am seidenen Faden (2013)

Wenn Worte meine Sprache wären (German: If Words Were My Language) is the debut album by German recording artist Tim Bendzko. It was released by Sony Music Columbia on 17 June 2011 in German-speaking Europe. Bendzko worked with music producer Swen Meyer on most of the album which features material that was either written or co-written by himself. Its music incorporates a range of the contemporary rock, folk, and pop music genres with a mix of slow ballads and jazzy uptempo tracks.

Upon its release, Wenn Worte meine Sprache wären established Bendzko as one of the biggest-selling new and upcoming acts of the year. It debuted and peaked at number four on the German Albums Chart and reached the top twenty in Austria and Switzerland. It achieved 5× gold status in Germany and was eventually certified gold and platinum in Austria and Switzerland.

== Critical reception ==
Professional ratings
Review scores
Source	Rating
laut.de	4/5 stars

laut.de editor Kai Butterweck rated the album four stars out of five. He found that "while the music gets stuck relatively quickly and settles somewhere between Annett Louisan, Max Mutzke and Roger Cicero, the lyrics require several iterations and, even in the third course, reveal hidden messages and messages that are denied to you at the beginning. The package is coherent and homogeneous."

== Chart performance ==
Wenn Worte meine Sprache wären debuted and peaked at number four on the German Albums Chart. It remained ten weeks within the top ten. In October 2011, Bendzko became the first musician to place an album and its first two singles, "Nur noch kurz die Welt retten" and "Wenn Worte meine Sprache wären", within both the German Albums and Singles Chart. In November of the same year, Wenn Worte meine Sprache wären was certified gold by the Bundesverband Musikindustrie (BVMI). By March 2012, it had sold more than 300,000 copies, and in August, the album had reached triple gold status. It was ranked 14th and 47th on the 2011 and 2012 German Year-End Chart, respectively, and has since been certified 5× gold.

== Track listing ==
All songs produced by Swen Meyer.

Wenn Worte meine Sprache wären – Standard edition
No.	Title	Writer(s)	Length
1.	"Auf den ersten Blick"	Bendzko; Sipho Sililo; David Vogt; Philip Böllhoff; Hannes Büscher; Peter J. Jordan	3:21
2.	"Sag einfach Ja"	Bendzko; Swen Meyer; Sililo; Vogt; Böllhoff; Büscher	2:56
3.	"Mehr davon"	Bendzko; Jordan; Sililo; Vogt; Böllhoff; Büscher	3:34
4.	"Du warst noch nie hier"	Bendzko	3:53
5.	"Wenn Worte meine Sprache wären"	Bendzko	3:29
6.	"Das letzte Mal"	Bendzko	3:44
7.	"Ich kann alles sehen"	Bendzko; Sililo; Vogt; Böllhoff; Büscher	2:52
8.	"Nur noch kurz die Welt retten"	Bendzko; Simon Triebel; Mo Brandis	3:11
9.	"Es kommt zurück"	Bendzko; Meyer	3:38
10.	"Ich laufe"	Bendzko	5:04
11.	"Schall & Rauch"	Bendzko; Kraans de Lutin; Jovanka von Wilsdorf	3:08
12.	"Ich hör nicht auf"	Bendzko; Aiko Rohd	4:05
13.	"Keine Zeit"	Bendzko	3:19

Wenn Worte meine Sprache wären – Deluxe edition
No.	Title	Writer(s)	Length
14.	"Das Ende der Welt"	Bendzko; Sililo; Vogt; Böllhoff; Büscher	3:22
15.	"Keiner Weiß"	Bendzko	3:35
16.	"In dein Herz"	Bendzko	3:29
17.	"Weitergehen"	Bendzko	4:31
18.	"Es wird nicht einfach sein"	Bendzko	3:56
19.	"Wenn Worte meine Sprache wären" (Single Version)	Bendzko	3:16
20.	"Ich laufe" (Single Version)	Bendzko	3:58

== Charts ==
=== Weekly charts ===
Weekly chart performance for Wenn Worte meine Sprache wären
Chart (2011)	Peak position
Austrian Albums (Ö3 Austria)	11
German Albums (Offizielle Top 100)	4
Swiss Albums (Schweizer Hitparade)	13

=== Year-end charts ===
Year-end chart performance for Wenn Worte meine Sprache wären
Chart (2011)	Rank
Austrian Albums (Ö3 Austria)	65
German Albums (Offizielle Top 100)	14
Swiss Albums (Schweizer Hitparade)	64

=== Decade-end charts ===
Decade-end chart performance for Wenn Worte meine Sprache wären
Chart (2010–2019)	Position
German Albums (Offizielle Top 100)	50

== Certifications ==
Certifications for Wenn Worte meine Sprache wären
Region	Certification	Certified units/sales
Austria (IFPI Austria)	Gold	10,000^{*}
Germany (BVMI)	5× Gold	500,000^{^}
Switzerland (IFPI Switzerland)	Gold	15,000^{^}
^{*} Sales figures based on certification alone.^{^} Shipments figures based on certification alone.

== Release history ==
Wenn Worte meine Sprache release history
Region	Date	Edition(s)	Format	Label	Ref.
Various	17 June 2011	Standard	Digital download; CD	Columbia Records; Sony Music	
Various	17 June 2011	Deluxe	Digital download; CD	Columbia Records; Sony Music	
Various	23 March 2012	Re-edition	Digital download; CD	Columbia Records; Sony Music	
