= Eduard Ebel =

German writer and pastor

Eduard Ebel (born August 7, 1839, in Stargard, West Prussia; † January 30, 1905, in Halle (Saale)) was a German Protestant pastor, superintendent and poet. He became known above all as the author of the still popular winter song Leise rieselt der Schnee, whose text he published in 1895 under the title Weihnachtsgruß.

== Life ==
Ebel studied theology in Königsberg (Prussia) and became a member of the student fraternity Germania in the summer semester of 1857. 1863/64 he was Oberhelfer (parish candidate) at the Rauhen Haus in Hamburg, 1866–69 pastor at the Franco-German Protestant parish of Beirut, 1866–69 pastor at the Diakonissenhaus in Königsberg, 1872 he became pastor of the Protestant parish in Graudenz and afterwards Protestant Superintendent in Halle (Saale).

He was married to Anna née Roethe, a sister of the medievalist Gustav Roethe.

In 1955, Eduard Ebel's daughter received an annual royalty of almost DM 10,000 from German music performance rights organization GEMA for "Leise rieselt der Schnee" (at the time, the standard period of music protection was 50 years after the author's death).

== Publications ==
- Weihnachten im Johanniterhospital zu Beirut in Syrien. In: Wochenblatt der Johanniter-Ordens-Balley Brandenburg, Band 10 (1869), Nr. 5, 3. Februar 1869, p. 27–28 (Digitalisat, p. 27, at Google Books).
- Morgenland und heilige Schrift: zwei Vorträge. Königsberg 1873.
- Kurze Geschichte der evangelischen Gemeinde Graudenz. Zur Feier des 100jährigen Bestehens der Friedrichskirche. 1885.
- Die soziale Frage und das Evangelium. 1892.
- Ein Weihnachtsmärchen. 1893.
- Gesammelte Gedichte. Gaebel, o. O. [Graudenz] 1895 (Scans from Wikimedia Commons).
