= Frank Lenart =

German actor and voice actor (born 1955)

- Born: 31 December 1955 (age 70); Los Angeles, California, U.S.
- Occupations: Actor; voice actor; dubbing director; dialogue writer
- Parent(s): Ernest Lenart; Renata Lenart
- Relatives: Franz Oppenheimer (grandfather); Hillel Oppenheimer (uncle)
- Website: franklenart.com

Frank Lenart (born 31 December 1955) is an American-born German actor, voice actor, dubbing director and dialogue writer. His acting credits include The Neverending Story II: The Next Chapter and The House of the Spirits, as well as the TV series Derrick. As a voice actor, Lenart has had roles in The Lion King, The Adventures of Paddington Bear and Finding Nemo. Lenart has written German scripts for many Disney productions, including Aladdin, The Lion King, Hercules, The Nightmare Before Christmas, as well as Monty Python's Flying Circus.

== Actor ==
- Aktenzeichen XY... ungelöst - two episodes (1979–1983)
- Derrick - episode "Das sechste Streichholz" (1981)
- Die seltsamen Methoden des Franz Josef Wanninger - episode "Eine windige Angelegenheit" (1982)
- Gummibärchen küßt man nicht (1989)
- The Neverending Story II: The Next Chapter (1990)
- The House of the Spirits (1993)

== Dubbing ==
=== Movies ===
- Banzai in The Lion King
- Jacques/Seagulls in Finding Nemo
- Ollie in Home on the Range
- Tito in Sunshine Barry & The Disco Worms

=== Television series ===
- Wildcat/Colonel Spigot in TaleSpin
- Tutter in Bear in the Big Blue House
