= Leise rieselt der Schnee =

1895 German Christmas song

Instrumental version for guitar and cello

Leise rieselt der Schnee (which translates as "softly falls the snow") is one of the most famous Christmas songs in the German language. It was composed in 1895 in Graudenz by the Protestant pastor Eduard Ebel (1839–1905) and published under the title Weihnachtsgruß ("Christmas greeting") in his volume Gesammelte Gedichte. The composition of the melody is also often attributed to Ebel, but this statement is uncertain and apparently unsupported, especially since Ebel's own publication contains only the text. According to other sources, the melody is a folk tune, which Ebel himself possibly adopted for his song. Other sources again suggest that the melody is based on a musette (1792) by Daniel Gottlob Türk (1750–1813); however, the similarity of the melodies only applies to the first one and a half bars.

== Melody ==
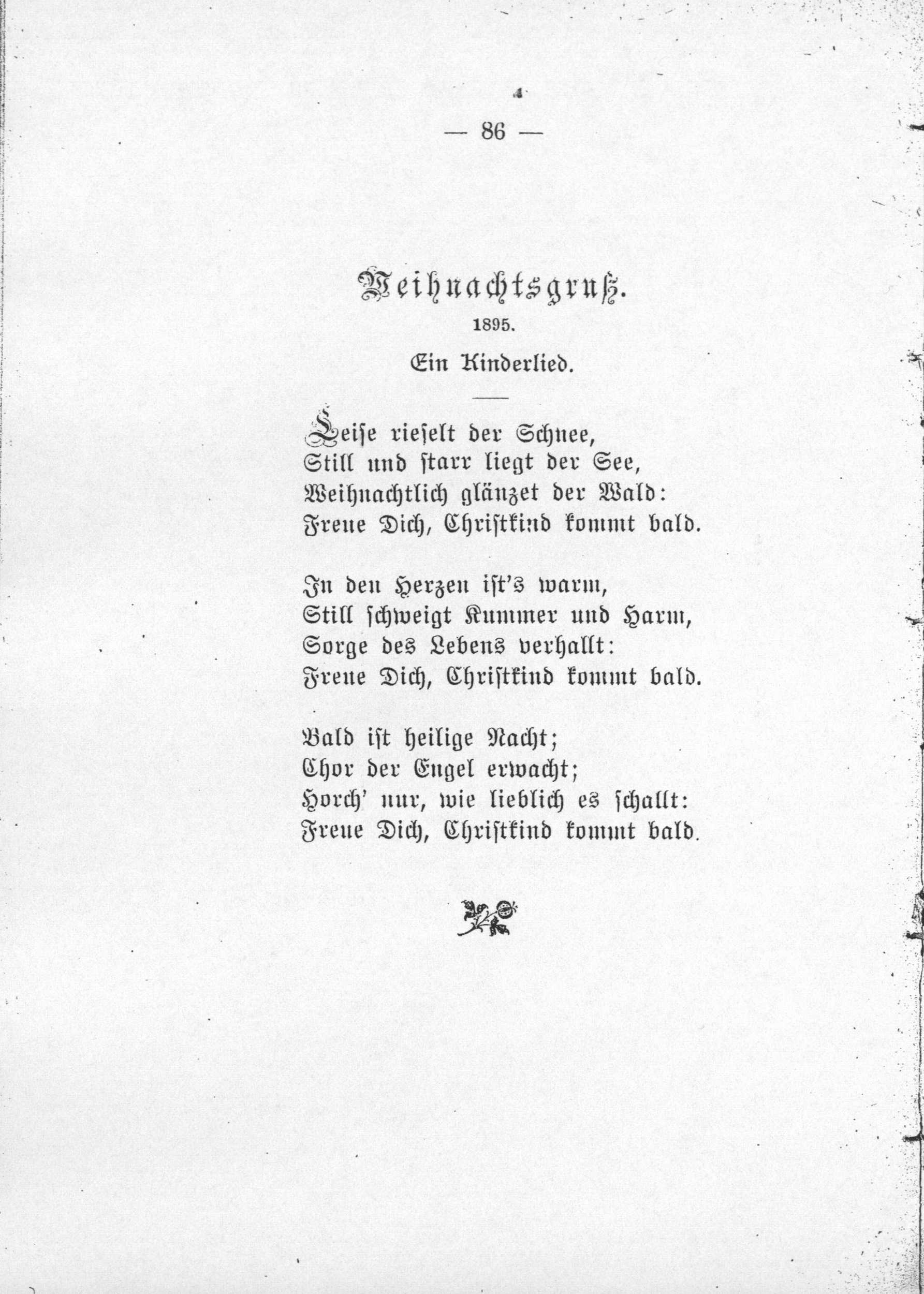
Lyrics of "Weihnachtsgruß" in Eduard Ebels Gesammelten Gedichten (1895), p. 86

== Lyrics ==
Leise rieselt der Schnee,
Still und starr liegt der See,
Weihnachtlich glänzet der Wald:
Freue Dich, Christkind kommt bald.

In den Herzen ist’s warm,
Still schweigt Kummer und Harm,
Sorge des Lebens verhallt:
Freue Dich, Christkind kommt bald.

Bald ist heilige Nacht;
Chor der Engel erwacht;
Horch’ nur, wie lieblich es schallt:
Freue Dich, Christkind kommt bald.

== Recordings ==
The song is included in the album Sinfonia di Natale by Rondò Veneziano (1995).
