= Milow =

Belgian musician

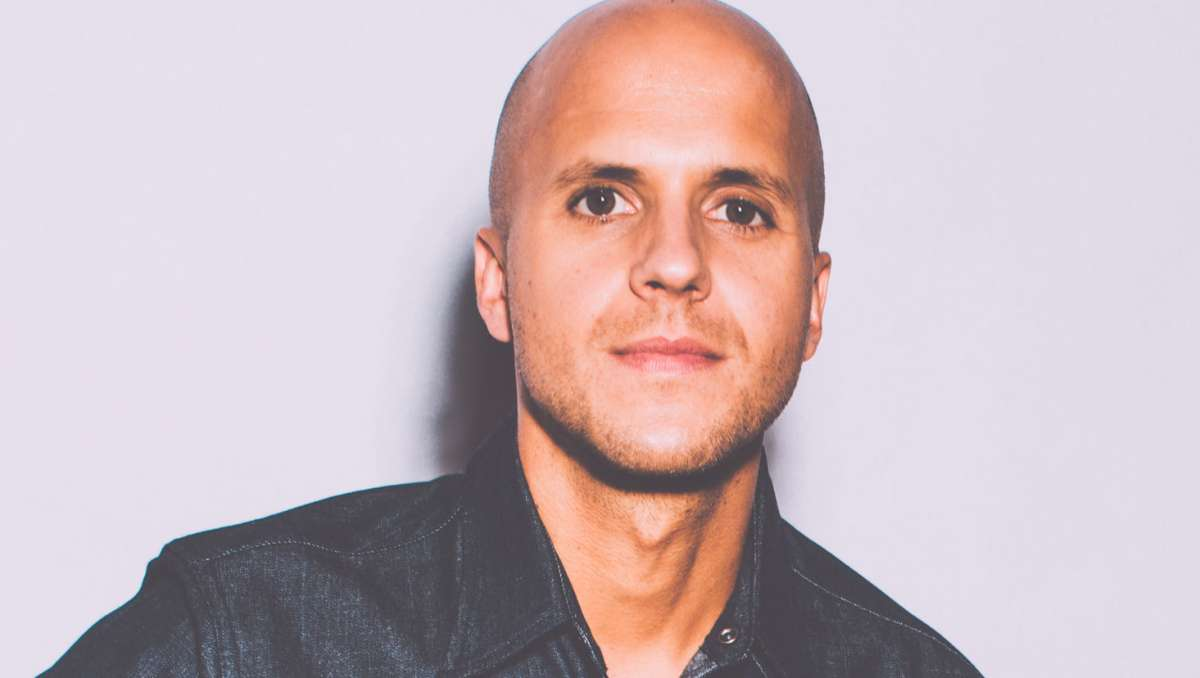
- Milow

Background information
- Born: Jonathan Ivo Gilles Vandenbroeck; 14 July 1981 (age 45); Borgerhout, Belgium
- Origin: Belgium
- Genres: Acoustic; pop
- Occupation: Singer-songwriter
- Instruments: Vocals; guitar
- Years active: 2004–present
- Labels: Homerun; Island
- Website: milow.com

Jonathan Ivo Gilles Vandenbroeck (Dutch: [ˈjoːnaːtɑɱ vɑndə(m)ˈbruk]; born 14 July 1981), known professionally as Milow, is a Belgian singer-songwriter. Milow released his debut album, The Bigger Picture in 2006 on his own label Homerun Records. The first single from that album, "One of It" was released in November 2005 and received moderate airplay, but his second single release "You Don't Know" became one of the biggest hit singles of the year in Belgium in 2007, and The Bigger Picture stayed on the Belgian albums chart for 110 weeks. However, it was not until his second self-released album Coming of Age in 2008 (in 2009 renamed and repackaged as Milow), that Milow achieved major commercial success all over mainland Europe. The album peaked at number three on the German albums chart, at number four in the Swiss Album Top 100, and peaked in the top twenty of many European charts. The album reached platinum in Germany and Switzerland, it reached gold in France, the Netherlands, and Belgium, and it sold over 500,000 copies in mainland Europe and Canada.

Milow's international breakthrough came with the release of the single "Ayo Technology", a song originally written and recorded by 50 Cent, Justin Timberlake and Timbaland, from the album Milow. The single peaked at number one in the Netherlands, Sweden, Denmark, Switzerland, Belgium, peaked at number two in Germany, Spain, Austria, and peaked in the top ten in France, Italy and Finland. The song was a huge commercial success, receiving a platinum certification in Germany, Sweden, Switzerland, Belgium, Austria, Denmark and gold certification in Spain and the Netherlands.

== Early life ==
Milow was born in Borgerhout, near Antwerp in Belgium, as the second of four children, with a Belgian father and a mother from the Netherlands. He grew up in Wespelaar, Haacht right next to Werchter, a town famous for its Rock Werchter festival, one of the biggest annual rock music festivals in Europe. Milow has said that his first concert experience was seeing Pink Floyd in Werchter in September 1994, on the group's final tour. The show inspired him to make his own music, and he became determined to perform on the festival site in Werchter one day. According to a documentary which aired on Belgium's Canvas TV in December 2011, Milow grew up in a house full of music instruments and signed up for accordion lessons with a local music teacher when he was a kid, but soon started taking piano and guitar lessons as well.

Milow spent a year as an exchange student in California, United States with the AFS Intercultural Programs in 1999–2000 at The Bishop’s School, where he wrote and performed songs. He has often said in interviews that this time helped him improve his skills writing songs in English and that he always felt he would one day return to California. In 2003, after having played in a few bands with friends from high school, Jonathan decided to start playing solo gigs and chose "Milow" as his artist name. Often asked why exactly that name, he has answered that there wasn't really a specific meaning, he just thought it would be easier for an international audience than his full name.

Milow was first heard at Humo's Rock Rally, a prestigious battle of the bands contest for unsigned rock bands in Belgium, organized every second year since 1978 by Belgian magazine HUMO. Many Belgian bands and artists, like dEUS, The Black Box Revelation, Absynthe Minded, Evil Superstars, Novastar, Arid, Das Pop, Admiral Freebee and Goose, launched their career in the Rock Rally. Milow's performance was awarded with a position in the finals but he did not win.

== Music career ==
=== The Bigger Picture (2005–2007) ===
In the summer of 2005, Milow recorded his first album The Bigger Picture together with Nigel Powell (formerly of the British group Unbelievable Truth and now the drummer for Frank Turner). The Bigger Picture was released in Belgium in January 2006 on Milow's own label Homerun Records. The first single from the album, "One of It" was released in November 2005 and received moderate airplay on Belgian Radio Stations Studio Brussel and Radio 1. Despite some good reviews in the Belgian press, the album entered the Belgian charts at No. 65 on 4 February 2006 but disappeared again after seven weeks.

Flemish newspaper De Standaard offered Milow a column in their online edition and Milow posted frequently between 2005 and 2009 on this blog titled Off the Record about the ups and downs of being a DIY musician.

Milow's national breakthrough came with the release of a newly recorded single version of the song "You Don't Know", the first of what would become a longtime collaboration between Milow and producer Jo Francken. After a slow start, "You Don't Know" became one of the biggest hits in Belgium in 2007, peaking at No. 3 in the Ultratop 50 single charts. The single's success led to The Bigger Picture re-entering the Top 100 Album chart in February 2007, eventually peaking at 10, reaching gold status and spending 110 weeks on the Belgian album charts.

On 28 June 2007, Milow was the opening act in the Pyramid Marquee on Rock Werchter, which launched his live career in Belgium. At the end of 2007, Milow won three awards at the first edition of the Music Industry Awards (MIAs) in Belgium: Best New Artist, Best Music Video ("You Don't Know") and Song of the Year for "You Don't Know".

=== Coming of Age / Milow & Ayo Technology (2008–2010) ===
In the summer of 2007, Milow started working on his second album Coming of Age with Belgian producer Jo Francken. According to the album liner notes, most of the album was recorded live over the course of three days with the help of some of Belgium's finest musicians like Tom Vanstiphout and Nina Babet (who both joined Milow's live band early 2008), and Ruben Block (Triggerfinger). In Belgium Dreamers and Renegades and The Ride were the lead singles. The album was released on Milow's label Homerun Records in Belgium on 1 February 2008. It entered the Belgian Ultratop 100 album chart at No. 6 on 9 February and reached number one the following week, the first time Milow hit the No. 1 spot with one of his albums.

During a radio visit at Belgian alternative radio station Studio Brussel on February 5th, 2008, Milow was asked to play a cover song as part of a live session to promote the release of Coming of Age. Milow opted for an acoustic guitar cover version of "Ayo Technology," a song originally written and recorded in 2007 by 50 Cent, Justin Timberlake and Timbaland. In the next few months, Milow started playing this cover during live concerts and ended up recording a single version with producer Jo Francken and musician Tom Vanstiphout. The single was first released in Belgium in September 2008.

One day after the video for "Ayo Technology" premiered online, Perez Hilton took notice of the video, calling it "Better than the original." On 21 November 2008, during a press conference in Europe, Kanye West explained why he posted the Ayo Technology video on his website in September: "I like the way Milow took the popular song and just completely flipped it, and the video too. So it's something I thought that was a really cool feature just to put on my blog." In the summer of 2009, TIME Magazine wrote in an article titled "The Short List of Things to Do": "'No. 1 in Belgium' is not usually a compelling reason to download a song. But Belgian singer-songwriter Milow's acoustic cover of this 50 Cent track, slowly making its way across the Atlantic, transforms Fitty's bawdy original into a riveting and tense ballad."

The sexually charged, tongue-in-cheek video for "Ayo Technology" proved to be a huge sensation online where it has received over 65 million plays on YouTube alone. The single reached No. 1 in Belgium, the Netherlands, Sweden, Switzerland and Denmark, peaked at number two in Germany, Spain, Austria, and peaked in the top ten in France, Italy and Finland, as well as a No. 1 position on the Spotify Top List. The song was a huge commercial success, receiving a platinum certification in Germany, Sweden, Switzerland, Belgium, Austria, Denmark and gold certification in Spain and the Netherlands. As of 17 December 2010, "Ayo Technology" was ranked No. 6 in CKOI/Montreal's Top 100 songs of the year, according to Mediabase 24/7. More than 300,000 copies were sold in Germany alone, worldwide more than one million copies.

"You Don't Know" was released all over Europe as the follow-up single to "Ayo Technology," and became a huge hit. It spent a cumulative 157 weeks on the European single charts, peaking at number seven in the Netherlands, number eight in Switzerland, number fifteen in Germany, and No. 21 in Austria. The song reached gold in Switzerland and platinum in Belgium.

The album Coming of Age was renamed and repackaged in 2009 as the compilation album Milow and released in 2009 and 2010 in mainland Europe and Canada as Milow's debut album. The album peaked at number three on the German Album Top 50 chart, at number four in the Swiss Album Top 100, and peaked in the top twenty of many European charts. The album reached platinum in Germany and Switzerland, it reached gold in France, the Netherlands, and Belgium, and it sold over 500,000 copies in mainland Europe and Canada.

In February 2009, for the second year in a row, Milow was a major winner of the Music Industry Awards in Belgium, winning five MIA Awards: Best Male Artist, Best Pop, Most Downloaded Artist, Best Music Video ("Ayo Technology"), and again Song of the Year ("Ayo Technology").

In 2009, Milow performed at some of Europe's most prestigious festivals, such as: Pinkpop Festival in Landgraaf (Netherlands) on 31 May, Rock am Ring & Rock im Park (Germany) on 5 & 6 June, Peace & Love Festival in Borlange (Sweden) on 26 June, Tollwood Festival in Munich (Germany) on 27 June, St. Gallen Open Air Festival in Sankt Gallen (Switzerland) on 28 June, iTunes Festival in London (UK) on 10 July, Frequency Festival in Sankt Polten (Austria) on 21 August. By the end of 2010 Milow and his band performed more than 300 concerts all over Europe.

On 6 July 2009, on the way to Stuttgart to perform as support act for Jason Mraz, Milow's tour bus caught fire and burned down completely. The band and instruments were saved. On 29 September 2009 Milow set a world record by performing in front of 50 mine workers at the bottom of the Pyhäsalmi Mine, 1,430 meters below sea level.

In the fall of 2009 Milow released Maybe Next Year his first live album and DVD, consisting of live recordings between 2008 and 2009.

In January 2010, Milow recorded a duet with Norwegian singer-songwriter Marit Larsen entitled "Out of My Hands." The song was originally released on Milow's second album Coming of Age, released in 2008 in Belgium. The duet version featuring Marit was released on 12 February 2010 via Milow's Myspace page and Marit's YouTube page.

In January 2010, Milow won the first Public Choice Award at the seventh annual European Border Breakers Awards (EBBAs) in Groningen, the Netherlands. Upon accepting the award, he thanked his fans for being "the first to believe in my music when no one wanted to support me," before urging the audience to legitimately pay for music they love. On 2 March 2010, Milow won an award for "Best International Newcomer" at the Swiss Music Awards in Zurich, Switzerland. The other two nominees were Kings of Leon and Lady Gaga.

=== North and South (2011–2014) ===
When touring in Europe in 2009 and 2010, Milow started writing new songs and trying them out live at concerts. The album North and South was recorded in Belgium with producer Jo Francken in 2010. Five tracks on the album were mixed by Grammy Award-winning audio engineer Tony Maserati, known for his work with Jason Mraz, Beyoncé, Lady Gaga, Robbie Robertson and Sergio Mendes.

On 1 April 2011 Milow released the album North and South simultaneously in mainland Europe and Canada. It entered the charts at No. 3 in the Netherlands, No. 4 in Germany and No. 5 in Belgium and Austria, and reached gold in Germany and platinum in Belgium. "You and Me (In My Pocket)", a sweetly sung but deceptively twisted love song, became the lead single for the new album. The single became a European airplay hit and peaked at No. 3 in Germany, at No. 6 in Belgium and Austria, and at No. 10 in Switzerland. The song reached gold in Belgium, Switzerland, and Austria, and platinum in Germany with more than 350,000 copies sold. "You and Me (In My Pocket)" has a music video (directed by longtime collaborator Isaac E. Gozin) that was shot in one single camera take. Perez Hilton posted this video on his blog and wrote, "If you like Jason Mraz or Jack Johnson, then you will love this!!! Milow is back with an instantly catchy folk/pop nugget!"

In an interview with PRI's The World Milow said the title North and South is a nod to all the non-stop touring he's been doing, from Northern Europe to Southern Europe. The song "The Kingdom" from "North and South" included lyrical references ("Where I'm from they are divided between the North and the South") to the political division in Belgium between the Northern and Southern parts of the country. In the interview with PRI's The World, Milow says it's the first political song he's ever written. Just like he predicted in the song ("Where I'm from they don't like dreamers, they're told to shut their mouth"), Milow was attacked by right-wing Flemish politicians on Twitter after an interview in newspaper De Standaard, in which he talked about the new album and about Belgian politics.

On 27 and 28 April 2011, Milow performed two sold-out headline shows in a row in the Ancienne Belgique in Brussels, Belgium. On 8 July, Milow performed for the first time at the legendary Montreux Jazz Festival in Switzerland, the best-known music festival in Switzerland and one of the most prestigious in Europe. On 9 July, he played his biggest headline concert in Europe so far, for 5,000 people in Munich, Germany. On 28 July 2011, Milow opened for Jack Johnson in Wiesen, Austria, and was invited on stage to perform Johnson's song "Breakdown."

The folk-tinged pop song "Little in the Middle" was released in July 2011 as the second single from North and South. It reached the number one spot in the Airplay Charts in Belgium and Austria, and reached the top ten airplay spot in Germany and Switzerland. Following this release, Milow had his biggest headlining tour so far with more than 50 concerts in 12 countries. Support acts on this tour included Brett Dennen, Priscilla Ahn and Marlon Roudette. In December 2011, Milow again won three MIA awards: 'Best Live Act', 'Best Male Solo Artist' and 'Best Pop Act', bringing his total to eleven Music Industry Awards so far.

In February 2012, Milow held a five-night residency performing solo at the intimate Hotel Cafe in Hollywood, California. The Hotel Cafe is a live music venue that has become known for helping to establish the careers of new singer-songwriters. Milow's first solo performance at Hotel Cafe was filmed by "Last Call with Carson Daly," and both "You Don't Know" and "You and Me (In My Pocket)" were broadcast on NBC on 9 February.

Since the start of his career, Milow has been a DIY artist, acting as his own manager, publisher and releasing albums on his own label, Homerun Records. Recently, he signed a management contract with Red Light Management in the US.

In April 2012, it was announced that Milow would release "Born in the Eighties," a six-song EP, as his first US release on 10 July 2012.

On 2 October 2012, Milow played in Beijing, China, marking his first Asian performance.

=== 2014–present: Silver Linings and Modern Heart ===
In April 2014, Milow released his sixth album Silver Linings. Recorded in Los Angeles at the Fairfax Recording Studios, he worked with a wider range of musicians on the album, including frequent collaborators Jo Francken and Kevin Augunas as well as Clif Norrell, Larry Goldings, and Matt Chamberlain. An instant success, it became his second album to top the Belgian Albums Chart and reached the top ten in Germany. Silver Linings spawned two singles, both of which were less successful on the single charts.

Wanting to stray from his typical acoustic pop sounds, Milow decided to work with musicians Brian Kennedy and James Fauntleroy in pursuit of a more urban direction on his seventh album Modern Heart. The results, chiefly produced by Marius de Vries and Joe Chiccarelli, took his sound wider into the tropical house and alternative R&B genres. Upon its release, Modern Heart debuted at number two on the Belgian Albums Chart and became his fourth consecutive top ten entry in Germany. Leading single "Howling at the Moon" peaked at number six on the Flemish Singles Chart and became another top twenty success in Austria and Germany.

In 2019, he participated in the sixth season of the German TV show Sing meinen Song – Das Tauschkonzert on VOX.

== Live band ==
In his live performances, Milow is backed by various musicians and singers.

- Milow (Jonathan Vandenbroeck) – acoustic guitar/lead singer
- Tom Vanstiphout – guitar/voice
- Nina Babet – voice/percussion
- Bart Delacourt – bass
- Oscar Kraal – drums
- Remko Kuhne/Luc Weytjens – keyboard

== Discography ==
- The Bigger Picture (2006)
- Coming of Age (2008)
- Milow (2009)
- North and South (2011)
- Silver Linings (2014)
- Modern Heart (2016)
- Lean into Me (2019)
- Nice to Meet You (2022)
- Boy Made Out of Stars (2025)

== Awards ==
=== Awards in Belgium ===
==== Radio 2 ====
2007

- Zomerhit – Newcomer

2011

- Zomerhit – Best Male Artist

==== TMF-awards ====
2007

- Best New Artist National

==== Music Industry Awards (MIA) ====
2007

- Best Music Video
- Best Song (for "You Don't Know")
- Best New Artist

2008

- Best Music Video
- Best Song (for "Ayo Technology")
- Best Pop
- Best Male Solo Artist
- Ultratop Download Award (Most Downloaded Award)

2011

- Best Live Act
- Best Pop Act
- Best Male Solo Artist

2012

- Best Pop Act

=== Awards outside Belgium ===
==== MTV Europe Music Awards ====
2009

- Best Dutch & Belgian Act (Nominated)

2012

- Best Belgian Act (nominated & won)

==== European Border Breakers Award ====
2010

- European Border Breakers Award for international success.
- Public Choice Award

==== Swiss Music Awards ====
2010

- Best International Newcomer

==== ECHO Awards ====
2010

- nominated Best Male International
- nominated Most Successful Newcomer International
- nominated Hit of the Year with "Ayo Technology"

2012

- nominated Best Male International Pop/Rock at the MTV Europe Music Awards
