= Christina Stürmer discography =

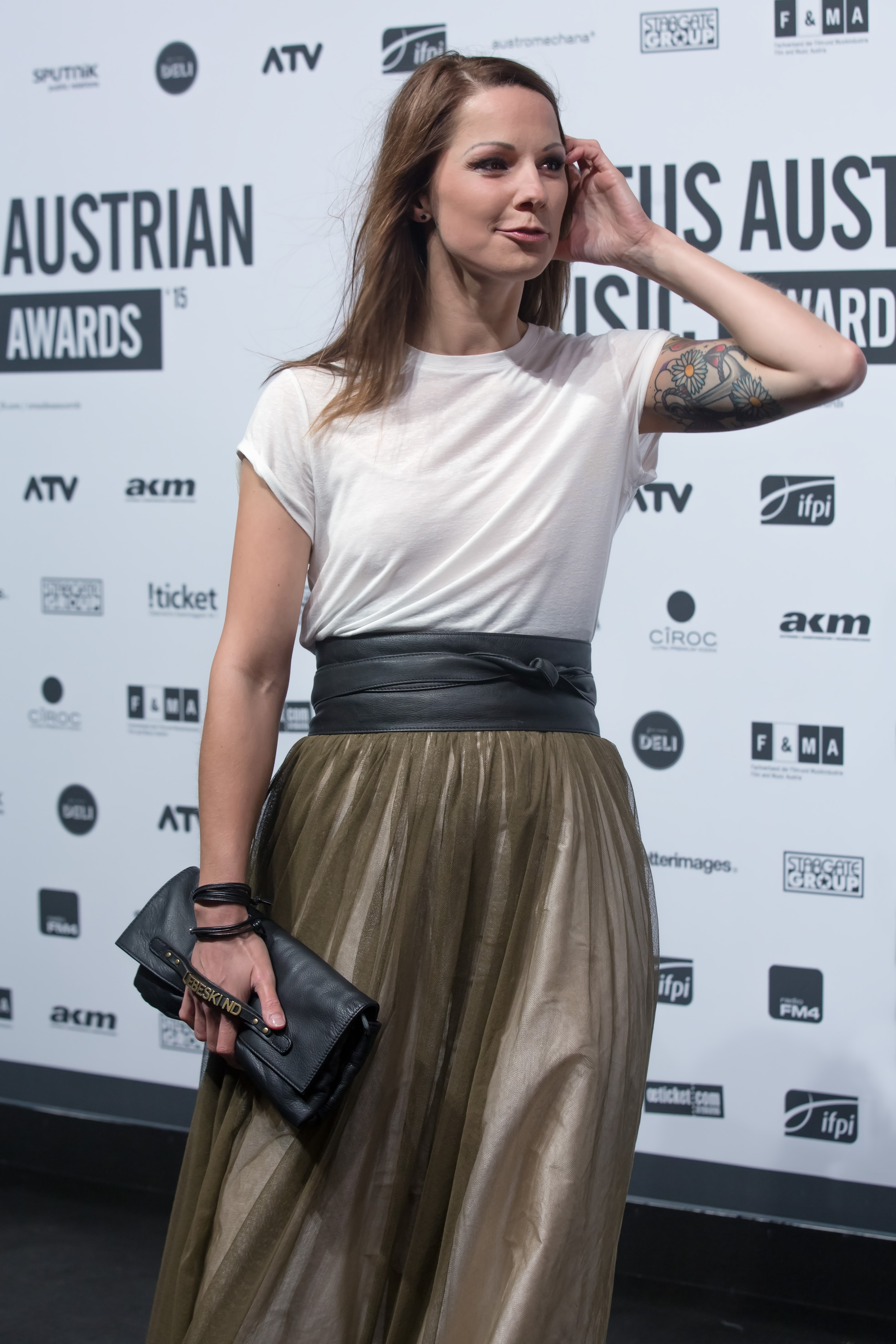
- Stürmer in Vienna (2015).
- Studio albums: 8
- Live albums: 2
- Compilation albums: 3

This is the discography of Christina Stürmer.

== Albums ==
=== Studio albums ===
List of albums, with selected chart positions and certifications
Title	Album details	Peak chart positions			Certifications
Title	Album details	AUT	GER	SWI	Certifications
Freier Fall	Released: June 2003; Label: Universal; Format: CD	1	—	—	IFPI AUT: 4× Platinum
Soll das wirklich alles sein	Released: June 2004; Label: Universal; Format: CD	1	—	—	IFPI AUT: 3× Platinum
Lebe lauter	Released: September 2006; Label: Polydor; Format: CD	1	1	6	IFPI AUT: 2× Platinum; IFPI SWI: Gold
In dieser Stadt	Released: April 2009; Label: Amadeo; Format: CD, digital	1	6	8	
Nahaufnahme	Released: October 2010; Label: Universal; Format: CD, digital	2	7	12	IFPI AUT: Platinum
Ich hör auf mein Herz	Released: April 2013; Label: Universal; Format: CD, digital	1	4	20	IFPI AUT: Platinum; BVMI: Gold
Seite an Seite	Released: 22 April 2016; Label: Universal; Format: CD, digital	1	2	12	IFPI AUT: Gold
Überall zu Hause	Released: 20 September 2018; Label: Polydor; Format: CD, digital	1	7	21	
"—" denotes releases that did not chart.

=== Live albums ===
List of albums, with selected chart positions and certifications
Title	Album details	Peak chart positions			Certifications
Title	Album details	AUT	GER	SWI	Certifications
Wirklich alles!	Released: 17 May 2005; Label: Universal; Format: CD, digital download	3	—	—	IFPI AUT: Platinum
Lebe lauter – Live	Released: 19 October 2007; Label: Universal; Format: CD; digital download	—	—	—	
MTV Unplugged in Wien	Released: 15 March 2024	1	—	—	
"—" denotes releases that did not chart.

=== Compilation albums ===
List of albums, with selected chart positions and certifications
Title	Album details	Peak chart positions			Certifications
Title	Album details	AUT	GER	SWI	Certifications
Schwarz Weiss	Released: June 2005; Label: Universal 9830359; Format: CD	—	3	12	BVMI: 2× Platinum; IFPI SWI: Gold
laut-Los	Released: April 2008; Label: Amadeo 06025 1766270; Format: CD	1	9	13	IFPI AUT: Platinum
Gestern. Heute.	Released: 15 May 2015; Label: Universal; Format: CD, digital	5	8	14	IFPI AUT: Platinum; BVMI: Gold

== Singles ==
List of singles, with selected chart positions
Title	Year	Peak chart positions				Certifications	Album
Title	Year	AUT	GER	SWI	EU	Certifications	Album
"Ich lebe"	2003	1	4	21	18	IFPI AUT: Platinum; BVMI: Gold	Freier Fall
"Geh nicht wenn du kommst"	2003	5	—	—	—		Freier Fall
"Mama (Ana Ahabak)"	2003	1	11	33	25	IFPI AUT: Platinum	Freier Fall
"Vorbei"	2004	1	83	—	—	IFPI AUT: Gold	Soll das wirklich alles sein?
"Bus durch London"	2004	5	—	—	—		Soll das wirklich alles sein?
"Weißt du wohin wir gehen"	2004	8	—	—	183		Soll das wirklich alles sein?
"Liebt sie dich so wie ich?"	2005	7	—	—	188		Soll das wirklich alles sein?
"Engel fliegen einsam"	2005	10	16	—	4		Schwarz Weiss
"Immer an euch geglaubt"	2006	—	46	—	—		Schwarz Weiss
"Nie genug"	2006	1	15	35	46		Lebe lauter
"Um bei dir zu sein"	2006	1	39	—	—	IFPI AUT: Gold	Lebe lauter
"Ohne dich"	2006	8	33	47	—		Lebe lauter
"Scherbenmeer"	2007	6	16	59	77		Lebe lauter
"Augenblick am Tag"	2007	29	—	—	—		Lebe lauter
"Mitten unterm Jahr"	2007	4	—	—	—		Lebe lauter
"Träume leben ewig"	2008	10	40	—	—		laut-Los
"Fieber"	2008	6	11	92	—		laut-Los
"Ist mir egal"	2009	8	28	—	—		In dieser Stadt
"Mehr als perfekt"	2009	23	99	—	—		In dieser Stadt
"Wir leben den Moment"	2010	10	30	52	—		Nahaufnahme
"Wenn die Welt untergeht"	2010	73	—	—	—		Nahaufnahme
"Millionen Lichter"	2013	5	23	61	—	BVMI: Gold	Ich hör auf mein Herz
"Ich hör auf mein Herz"	2013	—	97	—	—		Ich hör auf mein Herz
"Was wirklich bleibt"	2015	10	26	40	—		Gestern. Heute.
"Seite an Seite"	2016	9	46	—	—		Seite an Seite
"Ein Teil von mir"	2016	—	—	—	—		Seite an Seite
"Du fehlst hier"	2017	—	—	—	—		Seite an Seite
"In ein paar Jahren"	2018	—	—	—	—		Überall zu Hause
"Du erinnerst mich an mein Herz"	2018	—	—	—	—		Überall zu Hause
"—" denotes releases that did not chart or weren't released in that country.
