= Gestern. Heute. =

Compilation album by Christina Stürmer
- Released: 15 May 2015
- Genre: Pop; pop rock
- Label: Universal Music

Christina Stürmer chronology
Ich hör auf mein Herz (2013)	Gestern. Heute. (2015)	Seite an Seite (2016)

Gestern. Heute. (English: Yesterday. Today.) is the second compilation album by Austrian singer Christina Stürmer. Compromising all of her studio albums, it was released on 15 May 2015 by Universal Music.

== Track listing ==
No.	Title	Writer(s)	Producer(s)	Length
1.	"Was wirklich bleibt"	Stürmer; Christian Neander; Tom Albrecht; Oliver Varga	Eki von Nice	3:24
2.	"Meer seh'n"	Tom Albrecht; Alexander Schroer	Eki von Nice	2:49
3.	"Ich hör auf mein Herz"	Stürmer; Neander; Oliver Varga; Tobias Röger	Christian Neander; David Jürgens	3:26
4.	"Millionen Lichter"	Tobias Röger	Neander; Jürgens	3:49
5.	"Wir leben den Moment"	Stürmer; Justin Balk; David Jürgens; Alexander Kim Lange	Olaf Opal	3:21
6.	"Mehr als perfekt"	Martin Fliegenschmidt; Jan-Philipp Kelber	Thorsten Brötzmann	3:36
7.	"In dieser Stadt"	Oliver Varga	Brötzmann	3:32
8.	"Fieber"	Varga; Jonathan Walter	Brötzmann	3:29
9.	"Scherbenmeer"	Tom Albrecht; Dior Da Silva; Marc Kaschke	Brötzmann	3:47
10.	"Ohne dich"	Paul Leisin; Tim Winter	Brötzmann	3:20
11.	"Nie genug"	Brötzmann; Alex Geringas; Ivo Mohring	Brötzmann	3:31
12.	"Mama (Ana Ahabak)"	Alexander Kahr; Robert Pfluger	Brötzmann	4:00
13.	"Vorbei"	Hanno Bruhn	Alexander Kahr	3:12
14.	"Ich lebe"	Frank Ramond; Maya Singh; Alexander Kahr; Eva Kraus; Harald Hanisch; Leopold Zillinger	Brötzmann	3:20
15.	"Engel fliegen einsam"	Singh; Hannes Strasser	Brötzmann	3:11

== Charts ==
=== Weekly charts ===
Chart (2015)	Peak position
Austrian Albums (Ö3 Austria)	5
German Albums (Offizielle Top 100)	8
Swiss Albums (Schweizer Hitparade)	14

=== Year-end charts ===
Chart (2015)	Position
Austrian Albums (Ö3 Austria)	31
German Albums (Offizielle Top 100)	64

== Certifications ==
Region	Certification	Certified units/sales
Austria (IFPI Austria)	Platinum	15,000^{*}
Germany (BVMI)	Gold	100,000^{‡}
^{*} Sales figures based on certification alone.^{‡} Sales+streaming figures based on certification alone.
