= List of number-one hits of 2006 (Austria) =

This is a list of the Austrian Singles Chart number-one hits of 2006.

Issue date	Song	Artist
6 January	"Big City Life"	Mattafix
13 January	"Big City Life"	Mattafix
20 January	"Big City Life"	Mattafix
27 January	"Big City Life"	Mattafix
3 February	"Love Generation"	Bob Sinclar presents Goleo VI featuring Gary "Nesta" Pine
10 February	"Love Generation"	Bob Sinclar presents Goleo VI featuring Gary "Nesta" Pine
17 February	"Love Generation"	Bob Sinclar presents Goleo VI featuring Gary "Nesta" Pine
24 February	"Love Generation"	Bob Sinclar presents Goleo VI featuring Gary "Nesta" Pine
3 March	"Love Generation"	Bob Sinclar presents Goleo VI featuring Gary "Nesta" Pine
10 March	"Love Generation"	Bob Sinclar presents Goleo VI featuring Gary "Nesta" Pine
17 March	"Love Generation"	Bob Sinclar presents Goleo VI featuring Gary "Nesta" Pine
24 March	"Rette mich"	Tokio Hotel
31 March	"Rette mich"	Tokio Hotel
7 April	"I Still Burn"	Tobias Regner
14 April	"I Still Burn"	Tobias Regner
21 April	"I Still Burn"	Tobias Regner
28 April	"I Still Burn"	Tobias Regner
5 May	"One"	Mary J. Blige and U2
12 May	"Nie genug"	Christina Stürmer
19 May	"Nie genug"	Christina Stürmer
26 May	"Crazy"	Gnarls Barkley
2 June	"Crazy"	Gnarls Barkley
9 June	"Crazy"	Gnarls Barkley
16 June	"Crazy"	Gnarls Barkley
23 June	"Crazy"	Gnarls Barkley
30 June	"Crazy"	Gnarls Barkley
7 July	"Crazy"	Gnarls Barkley
14 July	"Crazy"	Gnarls Barkley
21 July	"Crazy"	Gnarls Barkley
28 July	"Crazy"	Gnarls Barkley
4 August	"Buttons"	The Pussycat Dolls featuring Snoop Dogg
11 August	"Buttons"	The Pussycat Dolls featuring Snoop Dogg
18 August	"Buttons"	The Pussycat Dolls featuring Snoop Dogg
25 August	"Stop! Dimentica"	Tiziano Ferro
1 September	"Um bei dir zu sein"	Christina Stürmer
8 September	"Der letzte Tag"	Tokio Hotel
15 September	"Um bei dir zu sein"	Christina Stürmer
22 September	"Um bei dir zu sein"	Christina Stürmer
29 September	"I Don't Feel Like Dancin'"	Scissor Sisters
6 October	"I Don't Feel Like Dancin'"	Scissor Sisters
13 October	"I Don't Feel Like Dancin'"	Scissor Sisters
20 October	"I Don't Feel Like Dancin'"	Scissor Sisters
27 October	"I Don't Feel Like Dancin'"	Scissor Sisters
3 November	"Das Beste"	Silbermond
10 November	"Das Beste"	Silbermond
17 November	"Das Beste"	Silbermond
24 November	"Das Beste"	Silbermond
1 December	"Das Beste"	Silbermond
8 December	"Das Beste"	Silbermond
15 December	"Shame"	Monrose
22 December	"Shame"	Monrose
29 December	"Shame"	Monrose

== See also ==
- 2006 in music
