= Worst of Jennifer Rostock =

Compilation album by Jennifer Rostock
- Released: 29 September 2017
- Recorded: 2007–2017
- Genre: Rock, punk, pop rock, electropop
- Label: Four Music
- Producer: Werner Krumme, Christian Bader, Chris Badami, Jennifer Rostock, Jay Maas, Alex Lys, Crada

Jennifer Rostock chronology
Genau in diesem Ton (2016)	Worst of Jennifer Rostock (2017)	Jennifer Rostock bleibt. (Live 2018) (2018)

Singles from Worst of Jennifer Rostock
- 1. "Alles cool" Released: 25 August 2017; 2. "Haarspray" Released: 22 September 2017; 3. "Die guten alten Zeiten" Released: 15 November 2017

Worst of Jennifer Rostock is the first compilation album by the German pop-punk band Jennifer Rostock. It was released on 29 September 2017 by Four Music. It has a collection of previously unreleased songs which originated in the production of the band's first five studio albums: Ins Offene Messer (2008), Der Film (2009), Mit Haut und Haar (2011), Schlaflos (2014) and Genau in diesem Ton (2016). The album was the last release before the band ceased performing from May 2018.

== Background ==
On 18 August 2017, Jennifer Rostock's Facebook account posted a picture of a blank pink square accompanied by the hashtag #wojr to state the imminent release of new music. Three days later, the band uploaded a video to its Facebook page of various clips of custard pie battles and the songs "Kopf Oder Zahl", "Du Willst Mir An Die Wäsche", "Es war nicht alles schlecht", "Ein Schmerz und eine Kehle" and "Hengstin". The purpose of the compilation was to celebrate the first ten years of Jennifer Rostock's career, which began with the release of the first commercial single with Warner Music, "Kopf oder Zahl", in 2008.

Tracks 11 to 13 are songs released on Facebook and YouTube in the previous few months. Track 14 was released with the befriended band Grossstadtgeflüster via betterplace.

== Promotion ==
=== Singles ===
Before its release, the first single, "Alles cool, was made available for download and streaming on 25 August 2017. Almost one month later, the band announced via its official Facebook page a further single called "Haarspray" with a release date set for 22 September 2017. The accompanying music video was premiered on 26 September 2017. Jennifer Weist said in an interview with 16Bars.tv that this song and "Wenn Ich Dein Gesicht Seh, Denk Ich An Meine Faust" ("When I See Your Face, I Think of My Fist") were intended to be included on the previous album, Genau in diesem Ton. With the release of a third single titled "Die Guten Alten Zeiten" ("The Good Old Times") on 15 November 2017, the band announced itw would cease performing after its planned tour in 2018. The accompanying music video, directed by Michael Winkler, was shot in Zinnowitz, Weist's and Walter's home town.

== Track listing ==
The track listing for the album is as confirmed via iTunes and Amazon.

Tracklist
No.	Title	Length
1.	"Alles Cool"	3:16
2.	"Flaschendrehen"	3:19
3.	"Schockverliebt"	2:49
4.	"Dschungel"	4:16
5.	"Polarmeer"	4:00
6.	"Wenn ich dein Gesicht seh, denke ich an meine Faust"	0:58
7.	"Weltbilder"	2:30
8.	"Haarspray"	3:38
9.	"Schlaflos Pt. 3"	3:55
10.	"Die guten alten Zeiten"	3:21
11.	"Liebe Bild"	1:45
12.	"Wähl die AfD"	2:18
13.	"Neider machen Leute (Version 2017)"	2:27
14.	"Keine Macht den Profis"	3:37

== Charts ==
Chart (2017)	Peak position
Austrian Albums (Ö3 Austria)	11
German Albums (Offizielle Top 100)	6
Swiss Albums (Schweizer Hitparade)	69
