= Geh nicht wenn du kommst =

Single by Christina Stürmer

from the album Freier Fall
- Released: 11 August 2003
- Genre: Pop rock
- Length: 4:03
- Label: Universal
- Songwriter(s): Hannes Strasser
- Producer(s): Alexander Kahr

Christina Stürmer singles chronology
"Ich lebe" (2003)	"Geh nicht wenn du kommst" (2003)	"Mama (Ana Ahabak)" (2003)

"Geh nicht wenn du kommst" (English: "Don't Leave If You Come") is a song by Austrian recording artist Christina Stürmer. It was written by Hannes Strasser and produced by Alexander Kahr for her debut studio album Freier Fall (2003). Released as the album's second single, the song was not as well-received as her previous single, "Ich lebe", but it did reach number five on the Austrian Singles Chart. As with most of Stürmer's previous singles, "Geh nicht wenn du kommst" was later re-recorded for her international debut album, Schwarz Weiss, released in 2005.

== Formats and track listings ==
CD maxi single
No.	Title	Length
1.	"Geh nicht wenn du kommst" (Radio Edit)	4:03
2.	"Ein Kompliment" (Live at Starmania)	2:27
3.	"Geh nicht wenn du kommst" (Karaoke Version)	4:03

== Charts ==
=== Weekly charts ===
Chart (2003)	Peak position
Austria (Ö3 Austria Top 40)	5

=== Year-end charts ===
Chart (2003)	Position
Austria (Ö3 Austria Top 40)	46
