= Live in Berlin =

Live in Berlin may refer to:

- Live in Berlin (Art Ensemble of Chicago album), 1991
- Live in Berlin (Depeche Mode album and video), 2014
- Live in Berlin (Marilyn Crispell album), 1984
- Live in Berlin (Jennifer Rostock album), 2012
- Live in Berlin (Rozz Williams album), 2000
- Live in Berlin (Sting album), 2010
- Live in Berlin, an album by Kriwi, 2004
- Live in Berlin, Vols. I and II, two albums by the Lounge Lizards, 1991/1992
- Acoustic Trio Live in Berlin, an album by Willy DeVille, 2002
- In Berlin, also released as Live in Berlin, an album by Blurt, 1981
- Live aus Berlin, an album by Rammstein, 1998
- Live aus Berlin (Rosenstolz album), 2003
- La Ultima / Live in Berlin, an album and concert film by Böhse Onkelz, 2005
- The Wall – Live in Berlin, a concert staging of Pink Floyd's The Wall by Roger Waters, 1990
- Live in East Berlin, a video by Kreator, 1990
- Live in Berlin, an album by Robert Gwisdek, also known as Käptn Peng, and Die Tentakel Von Delphi, 2015
