= Seite =

Seite is a German word meaning side.

Seite may also refer to:

- Berndt Seite (born 1940), German politician
- SEITE, acronym for South East Institute for Theological Education, United Kingdom
- Seite an Seite, the seventh studio album by Austrian recording artist Christina Stürmer
