= Schwarz Weiss =

Compilation album by Christina Stürmer
- Released: 30 May 2005
- Genre: Pop; pop rock
- Length: 46:11
- Label: Polydor
- Producer: Thorsten Brötzmann; Alexander Kahr

Christina Stürmer chronology
Wirklich Alles! (2004)	Schwarz Weiss (2005)	Lebe Lauter (2006)

Singles from Schwarz Weiss
- 1. "Vorbei" Released: 5 September 2004; 2. "Ich lebe" Released: 25 April 2005; 3. "Engel fliegen einsam" Released: 1 August 2005; 4. "Mama (Ana Ahabak)" Released: 5 November 2005; 5. "Immer an euch geglaubt" Released: March 10, 2006

Professional ratings
Review scores
Source	Rating
Allmusic	Not rated

Schwarz Weiss (English: Black White) is a studio album by Austrian recording artist Christina Stürmer, comprising new interpretations of songs from her first two albums Freier Fall (2003) and Soll das wirklich alles sein? (2004), it was released on 30 May 2005 by Polydor Records, serving as her debut album in Germany and Switzerland.

The songs "Ich Lebe", "Vorbei" and "Engel fliegen einsam" were released as singles. Stürmer won the 2005 "Single of the year" Amadeus Austrian Music Award with "Engel fliegen einsam". The album was certified 2× Platinum in Germany and Gold in Switzerland.

== Track listing ==
No.	Title	Writer(s)	Producer(s)	Length
1.	"Bist du bei mir"	Stürmer; Oliver Varga	Thorsten Brötzmann	3:15
2.	"Ich lebe"	Frank Ramond; Maya Singh; Alexander Kahr; Eva Kraus; Harald Hanisch; Leopold Zillinger	Brötzmann	3:20
3.	"Schwarz Weiss"	Kahr; Robert Pfluger; David Young; Shannon Penn	Brötzmann	3:46
4.	"Engel fliegen einsam"	Singh; Hannes Strasser	Brötzmann	3:11
5.	"Glücklich"	Jan Löchel; Jennifer Schüller	Brötzmann	2:56
6.	"4 Jahreszeiten"	Klaus Pérez-Salado	Brötzmann	4:12
7.	"Immer an euch geglaubt"	Singh; Alexander Kahr; Robert Pfluger; Christian A. Konrad; Bernhard Lassl	Brötzmann	3:34
8.	"Mama (Ana Ahabak)"	Singh; Kahr; Pfluger	Brötzmann	4:00
9.	"Kind des Universums"	Christian Lohr; Singh	Brötzmann	4:12
10.	"Vorbei"	Hanno Bruhn	Alexander Kahr	3:12
11.	"So wie ich bin"	Jan Löchel; Jennifer Schüller; Gösta Hulden	Brötzmann	3:06
12.	"Liebt sie dich so wie ich?"	Kurt Keinrath; Peter Wessely	Kahr	3:25
13.	"Geh nicht wenn du kommst"	Strasser	Kahr	4:04

== Special features ==
As special features the CD contains the music videos for Vorbei and Ich lebe along with an exclusive interview with Christina Stürmer. These can be viewed when the CD is played on a computer.

== Charts ==
=== Weekly charts ===
Chart (2005)	Peak position
German Albums (Offizielle Top 100)	3
Swiss Albums (Schweizer Hitparade)	12

=== Year-end charts ===
Chart (2005)	Position
German Albums (Offizielle Top 100)	14
Swiss Albums (Schweizer Hitparade)	50
Chart (2006)	Position
German Albums (Offizielle Top 100)	41

== Certifications ==
Region	Certification	Certified units/sales
Germany (BVMI)	2× Platinum	400,000^{^}
Switzerland (IFPI Switzerland)	Gold	20,000^{^}
^{^} Shipments figures based on certification alone.
