= Fieber =

Fieber is a German surname. Notable people with the surname include:

- Clarence Fieber (1913–1985), American Baseball pitcher
- Franz Xaver Fieber (1807–1872), German botanist and entomologist
- Peter Fieber (born 1964), Slovak football player
- Peter Fieber (footballer born 1989) (born 1989), Slovak football player

== See also ==
- Fever (2014 film), a 2014 Austrian film
- Fieber (Christina Stürmer song), released in 2008
- Fieber (Oomph! song), released in 1999
