= Live in Berlin (Jennifer Rostock album) =

Live album by Jennifer Rostock
- Released: August 10, 2012
- Recorded: May 4 & 5, 2012
- Venue: Stattbad Wedding (Berlin, Germany)
- Genre: Pop; pop rock; rock; punk; electropop; alternative
- Length: 59:33
- Label: Warner Music Germany

Jennifer Rostock chronology
Mit Haut und Haar (2011)	Live in Berlin (2012)	Schlaflos (2014)

Live in Berlin is a live album and video by German pop-punk band Jennifer Rostock, released on August 10, 2012. It was recorded at Stattbad Wedding in Berlin and includes songs from their first three studio albums: Ins Offene Messer, Der Film, and Mit Haut und Haar.

It peaked at #3 on the Billboard Germany Albums chart.

== Track listing ==
No.	Title	Original Album	Length
1.	"Intro / Mein Mikrofon"	Mit Haut und Haar	5:10
2.	"Es tut wieder weh"	New Moon: Original Motion Picture Soundtrack	3:40
3.	"Der Kapitän"	Mit Haut und Haar	2:28
4.	"Himalaya"	Ins offene Messer	3:35
5.	"Du willst mir an die Wäsche" (feat. Sido)	Der Film	3:34
6.	"Ich kann nicht mehr"	Mit Haut und Haar	3:46
7.	"Hier werd ich nicht alt"	Mit Haut und Haar	4:33
8.	"Wo willst du hin?"	Der Film	3:15
9.	"Irgendwo anders"		4:09
10.	"Meine bessere Hälfte"	Mit Haut und Haar	3:55
11.	"Kopf oder Zahl" (feat. Egotronic)	Ins offene Messer	3:25
12.	"Feuer"	Ins offene Messer	3:01
13.	"Insekten im Eis" (feat. Jupiter Jones)	Mit Haut und Haar	4:08
14.	"Nenn mich nicht Jenny"	Der Film	4:19
15.	"Es war nicht alles schlecht" (feat. Nico of War from a Harlots Mouth)	Mit Haut und Haar	6:35
Total length:			59:33
