= Genau in diesem Ton =

Studio album by Jennifer Rostock
- Released: 9 September 2016
- Recorded: January 2016 at Getaway Recording Studios (Boston, United States); Principal Studios (Senden, Germany); Studio X (Berlin, Germany); Studio Bohème (Berlin, Germany); Desue's Crib (Berlin, Germany); Feeling Valencia (Berlin, Germany)
- Genre: Rock, punk, pop rock, electropop
- Length: 42:22
- Label: Four Music
- Producer: Jennifer Rostock; Jay Maas; Alex Lys; Crada

Jennifer Rostock chronology
Schlaflos (2014)	Genau in diesem Ton (2016)	Worst of Jennifer Rostock (2017)

Singles from Genau in diesem Ton
- 1. "Irgendwas ist immer" Released: 8 July 2016; 2. "Uns gehört die Nacht" Released: 12 August 2016; 3. "Wir waren hier" Released: 4 September 2016; 4. "Hengstin" Released: 28 October 2016; 5. "Deiche" Released: 7 March 2017

Professional ratings
Review scores
Source	Rating
Laut.de	2/5 stars
CDStarts.de	6/10 stars
Plattentests.de	6/10 stars

Genau in diesem Ton (English: Take that exact tone) is the fifth studio album by German pop-punk band Jennifer Rostock. It was released on 9 September 2016 by Four Music, following the expiration of their recording contract with Warner Music Group in 2014. The album became available for pre-order on all music digital distribution platforms on 8 July 2016. Alongside the pre-order, the album's lead single "Irgendwas ist immer" and a further track titled "Wir sind alle nicht von hier" were released. Since the announcement of the album, the band has further teased the new music through the release of promotional singles "Uns gehört die Nacht" and "Wir waren hier".

== Title ==
In an interview at the 2016 Open Flair Festival in Eschwege Johannes Walter claimed that Genau in diesem Ton refers to both the musical and the lyrical features on the record. According to Walter, the title should represent the rebellious and more straight forward sound of the record.

== Track listings ==
No.	Title	Writer(s)	Producer(s)	Length
1.	"Uns gehört die Nacht"	Jennifer Weist; Johannes Walter	Weist; Walter; Christoph Deckert; Alexander Voigt; Christopher Kohl; Jay Maas	2:59
2.	"Irgendwas ist immer"	Weist; Walter	Weist; Walter; Deckert; Voigt; Kohl; Maas	1:58
3.	"Baukräne"	Weist; Walter	Weist; Walter; Deckert; Voigt; Kohl; Maas	3:27
4.	"Wir waren hier"	Weist; Walter	Weist; Walter; Deckert; Voigt; Kohl; Maas	3:58
5.	"Neider machen Leute"	Weist; Walter	Weist; Walter; Deckert; Voigt; Kohl; Maas	3:20
6.	"Hengstin"	Weist; Walter; Alex Lys; Jen Bender; Riffsn	Lys	3:43
7.	"Ebbe & Flut"	Weist; Walter	Weist; Walter; Deckert; Voigt; Kohl; Maas	1:19
8.	"Deiche"	Weist; Walter	Weist; Walter; Deckert; Voigt; Kohl; Maas	3:47
9.	"Silikon gegen Sexismus"	Weist; Walter	Weist; Walter; Deckert; Voigt; Kohl; Maas	3:08
10.	"Leuchtturm"	Weist; Walter	Weist; Walter; Deckert; Voigt; Kohl; Maas	3:34
11.	"Wir sind alle nicht von hier"	Weist; Walter	Weist; Walter; Deckert; Voigt; Kohl; Maas	3:26
12.	"Jenga"	Weist; Walter; Elmar Weyland	Crada	5:28
13.	"I Love You But I've Chosen Dispo"	Weist; Walter	Weist; Walter; Deckert; Voigt; Kohl; Maas	2:15
Total length:				42:22

Digital edition bonus tracks
No.	Title	Length
14.	"Uns gehört die Nacht" (Instrumental)	2:59
15.	"Irgendwas ist immer" (Instrumental)	1:58
16.	"Baukräne" (Instrumental)	3:27
17.	"Wir waren hier" (Instrumental)	3:58
18.	"Neider machen Leute" (Instrumental)	3:20
19.	"Hengstin" (Instrumental)	3:43
20.	"Ebbe & Flut" (Instrumental)	1:19
21.	"Deiche" (Instrumental)	3:47
22.	"Silikon gegen Sexismus" (Instrumental)	3:08
23.	"Leuchtturm" (Instrumental)	3:34
24.	"Wir sind alle nicht von hier" (Instrumental)	3:26
25.	"Jenga" (Instrumental)	5:28
26.	"I Love You But I've Chosen Dispo" (Instrumental)	2:15
27.	"Irgendwas ist immer" (GSGF Remix)	3:45
28.	"Hengstin" (Abaz x X-Plosive Edit)	3:01
29.	"Deiche" (Bad Paris Remix)	6:36
30.	"Silikon gegen Sexismus" (Deorbiting Remix)	6:16
31.	"I Love You But I've Chosen Dispo" (featuring Broke Boys) (Amokkoma Remix)	3:32
Total length:		107:54

Digital Sprachnachricht von Sam edition bonus tracks
No.	Title	Length
1.	"Irgendwas ist immer" (Sprachnachricht von Sam)	0:20
2.	"Wir sind alle nicht von hier" (Sprachnachricht von Sam)	0:30
3.	"Uns gehört die Nacht" (Sprachnachricht von Sam)	0:22
4.	"Silikon gegen Sexismus" (Sprachnachricht von Sam)	0:34
5.	"Jenga" (Sprachnachricht von Sam)	0:52
6.	"I Love You But I've Chosen Dispo" (Sprachnachricht von Sam)	0:49
7.	"Deiche" (Sprachnachricht von Sam)	0:38
8.	"Leuchtturm" (Sprachnachricht von Sam)	0:34
9.	"Neider machen Leute" (Sprachnachricht von Sam)	0:31
Total length:		5:10

Limited edition bonus instrumental disc
No.	Title	Length
1.	"Uns gehört die Nacht" (Instrumental)	2:59
2.	"Irgendwas ist immer" (Instrumental)	1:58
3.	"Baukräne" (Instrumental)	3:27
4.	"Wir waren hier" (Instrumental)	3:58
5.	"Neider machen Leute" (Instrumental)	3:20
6.	"Hengstin" (Instrumental)	3:43
7.	"Ebbe & Flut" (Instrumental)	1:19>
8.	"Deiche" (Instrumental)	3:47
9.	"Silikon gegen Sexismus" (Instrumental)	3:08
10.	"Leuchtturm" (Instrumental)	3:34
11.	"Wir sind alle nicht von hier" (Instrumental)	3:26
12.	"Jenga" (Instrumental)	5:28
13.	"I Love You But I've Chosen Dispo" (Instrumental)	2:15
Total length:		42:22

Limited edition bonus remix disc
No.	Title	Length
1.	"Irgendwas ist immer" (GSGF Remix)	3:45
2.	"Hengstin" (Abaz x X-Plosive Edit)	3:01
3.	"Deiche" (Bad Paris Remix)	6:36
4.	"Silikon gegen Sexismus" (Deorbiting Remix)	6:16
5.	"I Love You But I've Chosen Dispo" (featuring Broke Boys) (Amokkoma Remix)	3:32
Total length:		23:10

== Personnel ==
Credits adapted from the liner notes of Genau in diesem Ton.

- Jennifer Weist – vocals, composer, producer
- Alexander Voigt – guitar, vocals, composer, producer
- Christopher Kohl – drums, vocals, composer, producer
- Christoph Deckert – bass, vocals, composer, producer design, layout
- Johannes Walter – keyboards, vocals, composer, producer
- Elmar Weyland – composer, additional guitar ("Jenga")
- Philipp Klemz – additional vocals ("Wir waren hier")
- Jay Maas - producer
- Alex Lys - composer, keyboards, additional guitar ("Hengstin")
- Moritz Enders – mixing
- Yunus "Kingsize" Cimen – additional mixing ("Jenga", "Hengstin", "Deiche")
- Robin Schmidt – mastering
- Birte Filmer – photography
- spring – design, layout

== Charts ==
Chart (2016)	Peak position
Austrian Albums (Ö3 Austria)	4
German Albums (Offizielle Top 100)	2
Swiss Albums (Schweizer Hitparade)	31
