= Es Tut Wieder Weh =

Single by Jennifer Rostock

from the album New Moon: Original Motion Picture Soundtrack
- B-side: "Wieder Geht's Von Vorne Los"
- Released: 18 December 2009
- Recorded: 2009
- Genre: Pop-Rock, Electropop
- Length: 3:42
- Label: Warner Music Germany
- Songwriter(s): Jennifer Weist, Johannes Walter
- Producer(s): Jochen Naaf

Jennifer Rostock singles chronology
"Du Willst Mir An Die Wäsche" (2009)	"Es Tut Wieder Weh" (2009)	"Irgendwo Anders" (2010)

Music video
- "Es Tut Wieder Weh" (Official video) on YouTube

"Es Tut Wieder Weh" (English: It Hurts Again) is a song by German alternative band Jennifer Rostock, and was released as the second single from the soundtrack to the film New Moon on 18 December 2009. The song has already been played during the band's live shows and was recorded and mixed in only one week.

== Song information ==
Lyrically, the song is about having lost a beloved person, especially a life partner and seeing this person again, which is connected to a heavy pain.

=== Extract ===
Du Tauchst In Mein Leben.
Und Mein Leben Wird Kalt.
Und Deine Versprechen Werden Müde Und Alt.
Du Tauchst In Mein Leben.
Und Ich spür', Wie Es Sticht.
Denn Du Siehst Mich Nicht.
Oh, Du Siehst Mich Nicht.

English Translation:

You Appear In My Life.
And My Life Becomes Cold.
And All Your Promises Become Tired And Old.
You Appear In My Life.
And I Feel How It Hurts.
Because You Don’t See Me.
Oh, You Don’t See Me.

== Track listing/formats ==
From Amazon.

Physical Single
No.	Title	Length
1.	"Es Tut Wieder Weh"	3:42
2.	"Wieder Geht’s Von Vorne Los"	2:41
3.	"Wo Willst Du Hin?" (Live From Rio)	4:19
4.	"Es Tut Wieder Weh" (Music Video)	3:43
5.	"Es Tut Wieder Weh" (Live In Munich)	3:52

iTunes Single
No.	Title	Length
1.	"Es Tut Wieder Weh"	3:42
2.	"Wieder Geht’s Von Vorne Los"	2:41
3.	"Wo Willst Du Hin?" (Live From Rio)	4:19
4.	"Du Willst Mir An Die Wäsche" (Ante Perry & Kolombo Remix)	8:11
5.	"Es Tut Wieder Weh" (Live In Munich)	3:52

Amazon Digital Single
No.	Title	Length
1.	"Es Tut Wieder Weh"	3:42
2.	"Wieder Geht’s Von Vorne Los"	2:41
3.	"Wo Willst Du Hin?" (Live From Rio)	4:19
4.	"Leben Auf Zeit" (Elektropop Version)	2:44

== Music video ==
The music video for "Es Tut Wieder Weh" was directed by Hagen Decker and had its premiere on MyVideo on 25 November 2009 and shows the band performing the song in black mirrored room. While they play, there are also scenes from New Moon intercut.

== Chart performance ==
Year	Title	Chart Positions		
Year	Title	GER	AUT	SWI
2009	"Es Tut Wieder Weh"	48	-	-

== Personnel ==
- Jennifer Weist - Vocals
- Johannes "Joe" Walter - Keyboard
- Alex Voigt - Guitar
- Christoph Deckert - Bass
- Christopher "Baku" Kohl - Drums
