= Bus durch London =

Single by Christina Stürmer

from the album Soll das wirklich alles sein?
- Released: 16 August 2004
- Genre: Pop rock
- Length: 3:17
- Label: Polydor
- Songwriter(s): Maya Singh
- Producer(s): Alexander Kahr

Christina Stürmer singles chronology
"Vorbei" (2004)	"Bus durch London" (2004)	"Weißt du wohin wir gehen" (2004)

"Bus durch London" (English: "Bus Through London") is a song by Austrian recording artist Christina Stürmer. It was written by Maya Singh and produced by Alexander Kahr for her second studio album, Soll das wirklich alles sein?. The song was released as the album's second single in August 2004, and reached number five on the Austrian Singles Chart.

== Formats and track listings ==
CD maxi single
No.	Title	Length
1.	"Bus durch London" (Radio Edit)	3:17
2.	"Keine Schule"	2:56
3.	"Bus durch London" (Album Version)	3:41
4.	"Bus durch London" (Karaoke Version)	3:17

== Charts ==
Chart (2004)	Peak position
Austria (Ö3 Austria Top 40)	5
