= Weißt du wohin wir gehen =

Single by Christina Stürmer

from the album Soll das wirklich alles sein?
- Released: 8 November 2004
- Genre: Pop rock
- Length: 4:02
- Label: Polydor
- Songwriter(s): Alexander Kahr; Robert Pfluger
- Producer(s): Alexander Kahr

Christina Stürmer singles chronology
"Bus durch London" (2004)	"Weißt du wohin wir gehen" (2004)	"Liebt sie dich so wie ich?" (2005)

"Weißt du wohin wir gehen" (English: "Do You Know Where We Go") is a song by Austrian recording artist Christina Stürmer. It was written by Robert Pfluger and Alexander Kahr for her second studio album, Soll das wirklich alles sein? (2004), while production was helmed by the latter. The song was released by Polydor Records as the album's third single in Austria, where it reached number eight on the Austrian Singles Chart.

== Formats and track listings ==
CD maxi single
No.	Title	Length
1.	"Weißt du wohin wir gehen" (Radio Edit)	4:02
2.	"Du bist nicht allein"	5:11
3.	"Weißt du wohin wir gehen" (Album Version)	4:09
4.	"Weißt du wohin wir gehen" (Karaoke Version)	4:02

== Charts ==
Chart (2004)	Peak position
Austria (Ö3 Austria Top 40)	8
