= Liebt sie dich so wie ich? =

Single by Christina Stürmer

from the album Soll das wirklich alles sein?
- Released: 21 February 2005
- Genre: Pop rock
- Length: 3:25
- Label: Polydor
- Songwriter(s): Kurt Keinrath; Peter Wessely
- Producer(s): Alexander Kahr

Christina Stürmer singles chronology
"Weißt du wohin wir gehen" (2004)	"Liebt sie dich so wie ich?" (2005)	"Ich lebe" (2005)

"Liebt sie dich so wie ich?" (English: "Does She Love You Like I Do?") is a song by Austrian recording artist Christina Stürmer. It was written by Kurt Keinrath and Peter Wessely for her second studio album, Soll das wirklich alles sein? (2004), while production was led by Alexander Kahr. The song was released as the album's fourth and final single in Austria and reached number seven on the Ö3 Austria Top 40.

== Formats and track listings ==
CD maxi single
No.	Title	Length
1.	"Liebt sie dich so wie ich?" (Radio Edit)	3:27
2.	"Es ist egal"	3:30
3.	"So wie ich bin"	3:08
4.	"Liebt sie dich so wie ich?" (Halbplayback Version)	3:46

== Charts ==
Chart (2005)	Peak position
Austria (Ö3 Austria Top 40)	7
