= Laut-Los =

laut-Los

Studio album by Christina Stürmer
- Released: 4 April 2008
- Recorded: 2008
- Genre: pop; acoustic pop
- Length: 47:28
- Label: Polydor
- Producer: Thorsten Brötzmann

Christina Stürmer chronology
| Lebe lauter (2006) | laut-Los (2008) | In dieser stadt (2009) |

Singles from laut-Los
- 1. "Träume leben ewig" Released: 28 March 2008; 2. "Fieber" Released: 23 May 2008

laut-Los is the first acoustic album by Christina Stürmer. Released on 4 April 2008, it includes five new songs. The song "Fieber" is the official anthem of the Austrian soccer team for the EURO 2008.

== Background ==
All the songs on laut-Los were re-recorded for the album in "unplugged" format except five new songs. Träume leben ewig, Optimist, Nie zu spät, Fieber, and Ochester in mir are new songs not previously recorded on any of Christina Stürmer's previous albums.

== Release ==
"Träume leben ewig", the first single from laut-Los, was released on 28 March 2008. It reached number ten in Austria but failed to meet the same success in Germany, reaching number forty on the charts there. The music video for the song starts with Stürmer lying in a chalk-lined bed. Shots of her and her band performing as shown. Stürmer is then shown at an outside café. Throughout the video, shots of Stürmer singing and looking out the window are shown.

"Fieber" was the second single from laut-Los. The song was released on 23 May 2008. Fieber is also the official anthem of the Austrian soccer team for the EURO 2008. The music video for Fieber shows Stürmer sitting outside watching the soccer game, and throughout the video, other sports fans join her and by the end of the video she has a crowd with her watching the game. The single "Mitten unterm Jahr" was released on 16 November 2007. It was only released in Austria, reaching number four on the charts.

The album was certified Platinum in Austria.

== Track listing ==
1. Augenblick am Tag (Day in the Blink of an Eye) - 3:09
2. Glücklich (Lucky) - 2:55
3. Träume leben ewig (Dreams Live Forever) - 3:52
4. Optimist (Optimist) - 3:08
5. Mitten Unterm Jahr (Under the Middle Years) - 4:19
6. Nie zu spät (Never Too Late) - 4:07
7. Fieber (Fever) - 3:11
8. An Sommertagen (On Summerdays) - 3:25
9. Geh nicht wenn du kommst (Do Not Go If You Come) - 4:02
10. Orchester in mir (Orchestra in Me) - 3:40
11. Ich lebe (I Live) - 3:16
12. Engel fliegen einsam (Angels Fly Lonely) - 4:14
13. Lebe lauter (Live Louder) - 3:52
14. Ohne Dich (Without You) - 3:12 [iTunes only]

== Charts ==
=== Weekly charts ===
| Chart (2008) | Peak position |
|---|---|
| Austrian Albums (Ö3 Austria) | 1 |
| German Albums (Offizielle Top 100) | 9 |
| Swiss Albums (Schweizer Hitparade) | 13 |

=== Year-end charts ===
| Chart (2008) | Position |
|---|---|
| Austrian Albums (Ö3 Austria) | 10 |

== Certifications ==
| Region | Certification | Certified units/sales |
|---|---|---|
| Austria (IFPI Austria) | Platinum | 20,000^{*} |
^{*} Sales figures based on certification alone.
