= Seite an Seite (song) =

Single by Christina Stürmer

from the album Seite an Seite
- Released: 8 April 2016
- Genre: Pop; pop rock
- Length: 3:41
- Label: Polydor; Universal
- Songwriter(s): Christoph Koterzina; Markus Schlichtherle; Daniel Flamm
- Producer(s): Eki von Nice

Christina Stürmer singles chronology
| "Was wirklich bleibt" (2015) | "Seite an Seite" (2016) | "Ein Teil von mir" (2016) |

"Seite an Seite" (German: Side by Side) is a song by Austrian recording artist Christina Stürmer. It was written by Christoph Koterzina, Markus Schlichtherle, and Daniel Flamm for her same-titled seventh studio album (2016), while production was helmed by Eki von Nice.

== Formats and track listings ==
Digital single
| No. | Title | Length |
|---|---|---|
| 1. | "Seite an Seite" | 3:41 |

== Charts ==
| Chart (2016) | Peak position |
|---|---|
| Austria (Ö3 Austria Top 40) | 9 |
| Germany (GfK) | 46 |
