= Irgendwo Anders =

Single by Jennifer Rostock

from the album Der Film
- Released: 11 June 2010
- Recorded: 2009
- Studio: Planet Roc (Berlin, Germany)
- Genre: Pop-Rock
- Length: 3:42
- Label: Warner Music Germany
- Songwriters: Jennifer Weist, Johannes Walter
- Producers: Werner Krumme, Christian Bader

Jennifer Rostock singles chronology
"Es Tut Wieder Weh" (2009)	"Irgendwo Anders" (2010)	"Mein Mikrofon" (2011)

"Irgendwo Anders" (engl. Somewhere Else) is a song by German alternative band Jennifer Rostock, released on 11 June 2010. The song was written by Jennifer Weist and Johannes Walter.

== Song ==
The song is a mid-tempo rock ballad. Lyrically, it is about two persons realizing that their relationship is no longer working.

== Track listing ==
Physical Single
No.	Title	Length
1.	"Irgendwo Anders"	3:42
2.	"Irgendwo Anders" (Akustik Version)	-
3.	"Irgendwo Anders" (Radar Radar Remix)	-
4.	"Irgendwo Anders" (Itboy!Itboy!Itboy! Remix)	-
5.	"Irgendwo Anders" (Seelenluft Remix)	-
6.	"Irgendwo Anders" (Music Video)	-

== Music video ==
The music video was released on 10 March 2010 on the band's MySpace profile.

== Charts ==
Year	Title	Chart Positions		
Year	Title	GER	AUT	SWI
2010	"Irgendwo Anders"	-	-	-

== Personnel ==
- Jennifer Weist - Vocals
- Johannes "Joe" Walter - Keyboard
- Alex Voigt - Guitar
- Christoph Deckert - Bass
- Christopher "Baku" Kohl - Drums
