= Nahaufnahme =

Studio album by Christina Stürmer
- Released: 24 September 2010
- Recorded: 2009–2010
- Genre: Pop rock; rock
- Label: Universal
- Producer: Olaf Opal

Christina Stürmer chronology
In dieser Stadt (2009)	Nahaufnahme (2010)	Ich hör auf mein Herz (2013)

Nahaufnahme (English: Closeup View) is the sixth studio album from Austrian singer Christina Stürmer. It was released by Universal on 24 September 2010 in German-speaking Europe. A commercial success, Nahaufnahme was certified platinum in Austria.

== Track listing ==
Nahaufnahme – Standard edition
No.	Title	Writer(s)	Length
1.	"Zeitlupe"	Simon Triebel; Tobias Röger	3:40
2.	"Wir leben den Moment"	Stürmer; Justin Balk; David Jürgens; Alexander Kim Lange	3:21
3.	"Der beste Morgen"	Triebel; Jochen Naaf; Axel Bosse	3:39
4.	"Macht nichts"	Jonathan Walter	3:16
5.	"Wenn die Welt untergeht"	Triebel	3:47
6.	"Juniherz"	Doris Decker; Daniel Nitt	3:39
7.	"Mit jedem Millimeter"	Triebel; Naaf; Tobias Röger	3:44
8.	"Warum"	Walter	3:28
9.	"Die Nacht singt keine Lieder"	Oliver Varga; Tobias Kuhn; Sebastian Wehlings	3:53
10.	"Gib mir den Sommer zurück"	Triebel; Naaf; Röger	3:17
11.	"So wie du bist"	Triebel; Naaf; Bosse	3:38
12.	"Die beste Zeit"	Claudio Pagonis; Röger	3:26

Nahaufnahme – Deluxe edition
No.	Title	Length
13.	"Gegen den Wind"	3:38
14.	"Wenn wir wollen"	3:36

== Charts ==
=== Weekly charts ===
Chart (2010)	Peak position
Austrian Albums (Ö3 Austria)	2
German Albums (Offizielle Top 100)	7
Swiss Albums (Schweizer Hitparade)	12

=== Year-end charts ===
Chart (2010)	Position
Austrian Albums (Ö3 Austria)	51

== Certifications ==
Region	Certification	Certified units/sales
Austria (IFPI Austria)	Platinum	20,000^{*}
^{*} Sales figures based on certification alone.
