= Jennifer Rostock =

German rock band

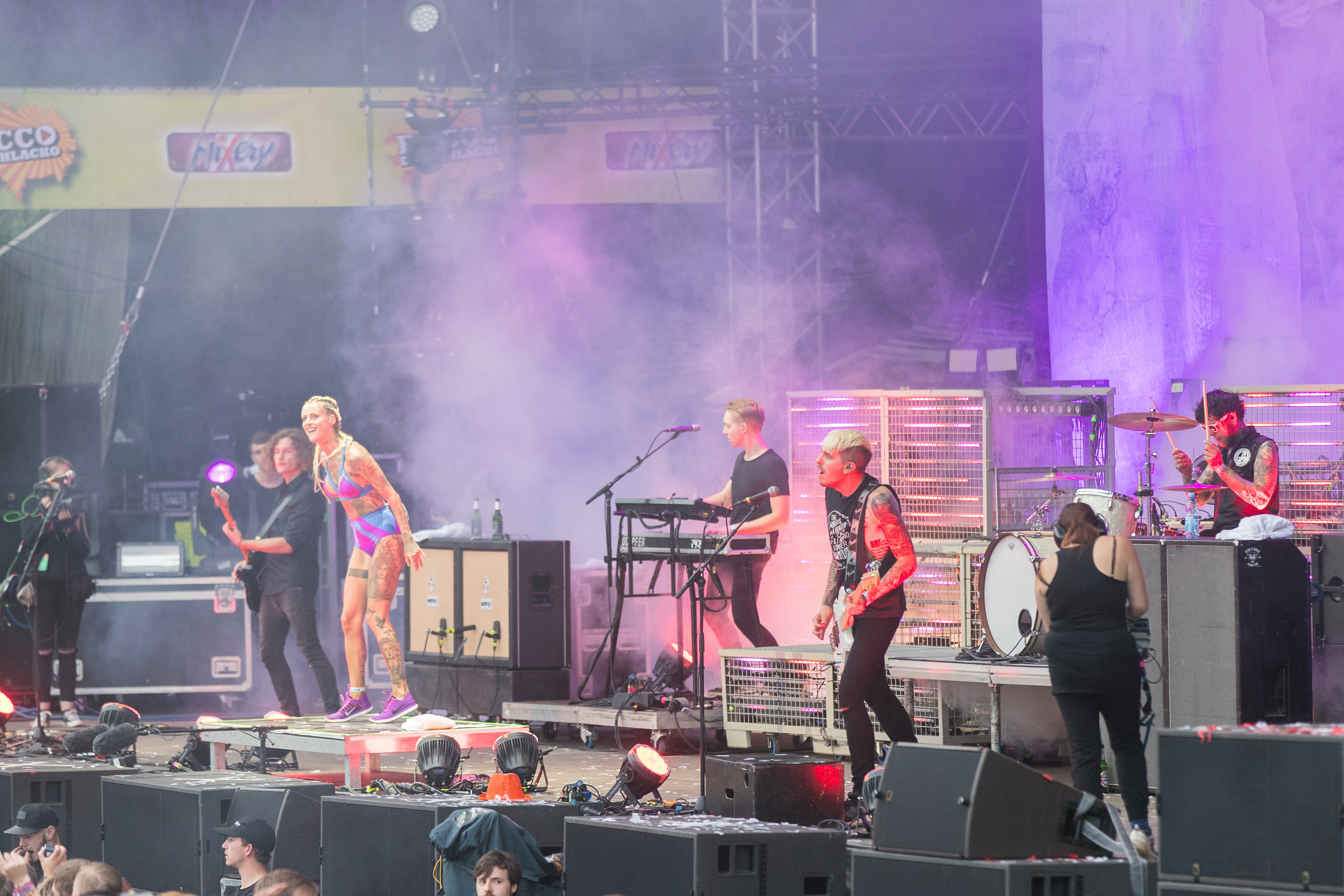
- Jennifer Rostock in 2016 (From left to right: Alex Voigt, Jennifer Weist, Joe Walter, Christoph Deckert, and Christopher "Baku" Kohl)

Background information
- Origin: Berlin, Germany
- Genres: Rock, alternative rock, punk rock, electropop
- Years active: 2007–2018, 2026-
- Label: Warner Music
- Members: Jennifer Weist; Johannes Walter-Müller (Joe Walter); Elmar Weyland; Josi Hille; Christopher "Baku" Kohl
- Past members: Jennifer Weist; Johannes Walter-Müller (Joe Walter); Alex Voigt; Christoph Deckert; Christopher "Baku" Kohl
- Website: http://www.jenniferrostock.de

Jennifer Rostock is a German rock band. They formed in 2007 out of Berlin and first rose to fame in 2008 for their performance in the German talent competition "The Bundesvision Song Contest"

== History ==
Jennifer Weist (born 3 December 1986) and Johannes Walter-Müller (Joe Walter) are both natives of the German Baltic island Usedom, where they first met in kindergarten. Walter-Müller started to take music lessons as a five-year-old; he initially learned the violin, later he started to play the piano. At the age of 13, he met Weist again when she was singing at a karaoke show, and he invited her to join his school band. They experimented with different genres such as rock, pop, and swing. In the beginning they sang in English, later in German, and they eventually wrote their own songs. In 2004, both founded the band Aerials.

They met Werner Krumme, who later became their record producer, during a songwriting workshop in Rostock. After both finished high school (Gymnasium) in the summer of 2006, they moved to Berlin to pursue a career in music. There they also met their future band members Alex, Christoph, and Baku.

The band's name was originally based on a misunderstanding. Employees at the Planet Roc Studio in Berlin repeatedly addressed notes for them to "Jennifer Rostock". Weist later explained: "Jennifer was directed at me, and Rostock, because they remembered we are from the coast, and Rostock was probably the only town the studio guys knew up there." This working title was eventually embraced by the band and became their official name.

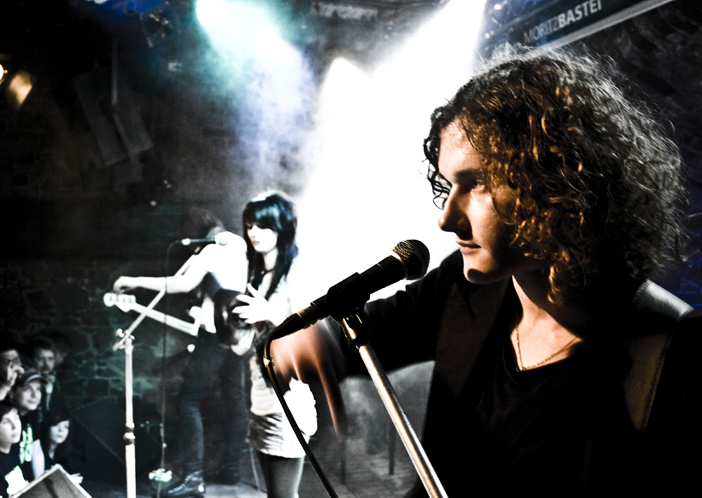
Guitarist Alex, lead vocalist Jennifer Weist in the background

In 2007, the group gave their first concerts as Jennifer Rostock and they signed a recording contract with Warner Music. They mainly performed in the Berlin club scene and played as opening acts for the British bands Chikinki and Gallows. In October, Jennifer Rostock released the EP Ich will hier raus as a vinyl record and they first receiving radio airplay by local stations in Berlin. In February 2008, their first single, "Kopf oder Zahl", was placed in rotation by MTV Germany. They competed with that song at the Bundesvision Song Contest, a German television show based on the Eurovision Song Contest, and came in fifth. Jennifer Rostock’s debut album, Ins offene Messer, was released the following day and reached number 31 in the German album charts.

They released two additional singles from their debut album, "Feuer" and "Himalaya". In June, Jennifer Rostock performed at MTV Campus Invasion in Jena, which was broadcast live by MTV, and they played at music festivals and concerts throughout Germany; they also had several shows in Austria and Switzerland. In October, they performed their song "Himalaya" at the tour premiere of German rock musician Udo Lindenberg in Rostock.

On 15 November 2017, the band announced via Facebook to go on hiatus after their planned tour for 2018. On 13 May 2018, they played their last show in the sold out Columbiahalle in Berlin.

=== 2026 Comeback ===
On June 23, 2026 Weist posted a cryptic video onto her socials in which she is entering a little shop to purchase beer. She is asking the owner if a band is about to play a gig in his establishment since musical equipment is scattered throughout the storefront. The latter affirms and informs her that the band will play to a later point in time on that day. Weist tells him that she will return to watch the band play. The following day the singer shared another cryptic video in which she is waiting on a sidewalk for a car. The driver asks if she is Jenny to which she replies "Jennifer, but yes." She then continues to ask the driver whether he knows where she is intending to go and he assures her that he does. The video ends with the car driving off while a short synthesizer melody reminiscent of the Jennifer Rostock sound is playing. The post is accompanied by the caption: "25.6. 0 Uhr 🤯" leading her community to expect an announcement at the following midnight. On the same day several other band members including Walter Müller and Kohl shared comparable videos onto their respective socials featuring the melody that was already included in the aforementioned Weist video.

On June 26, 2026, the band released their new single and video, "Wir schon wieder" ("It's us again!"). The band also announced that Christoph Deckert is officially leaving the band and was subsequently replaced by Josi Hille.. Elmar Weyland has also replaced guitarist Alex Voigt on guitar. Weyland was already know to the band as he had previously replaced Voigt on tour in 2018 while Voigt was on paternity leave.

== Music ==
Jennifer Rostock's line-up consists of lead vocalist Jennifer Weist, keyboardist Johannes "Joe" Walter-Müller, guitarist Alex, bassist Christoph, and drummer Baku. The group's unconventional German lyrics are collectively written by Weist and Walter-Müller who also compose and arrange the songs. Although difficult to categorise, Jennifer Rostock are sometimes compared to the Neue Deutsche Welle, especially due to their first single, "Kopf oder Zahl", and its similarities to the German 1980's band Ideal. The German newspaper die tageszeitung described their music as "between glam punk, electropop and Berlin-rock". They have also been described as mixing alternative rock with punk and electro.

== Discography ==
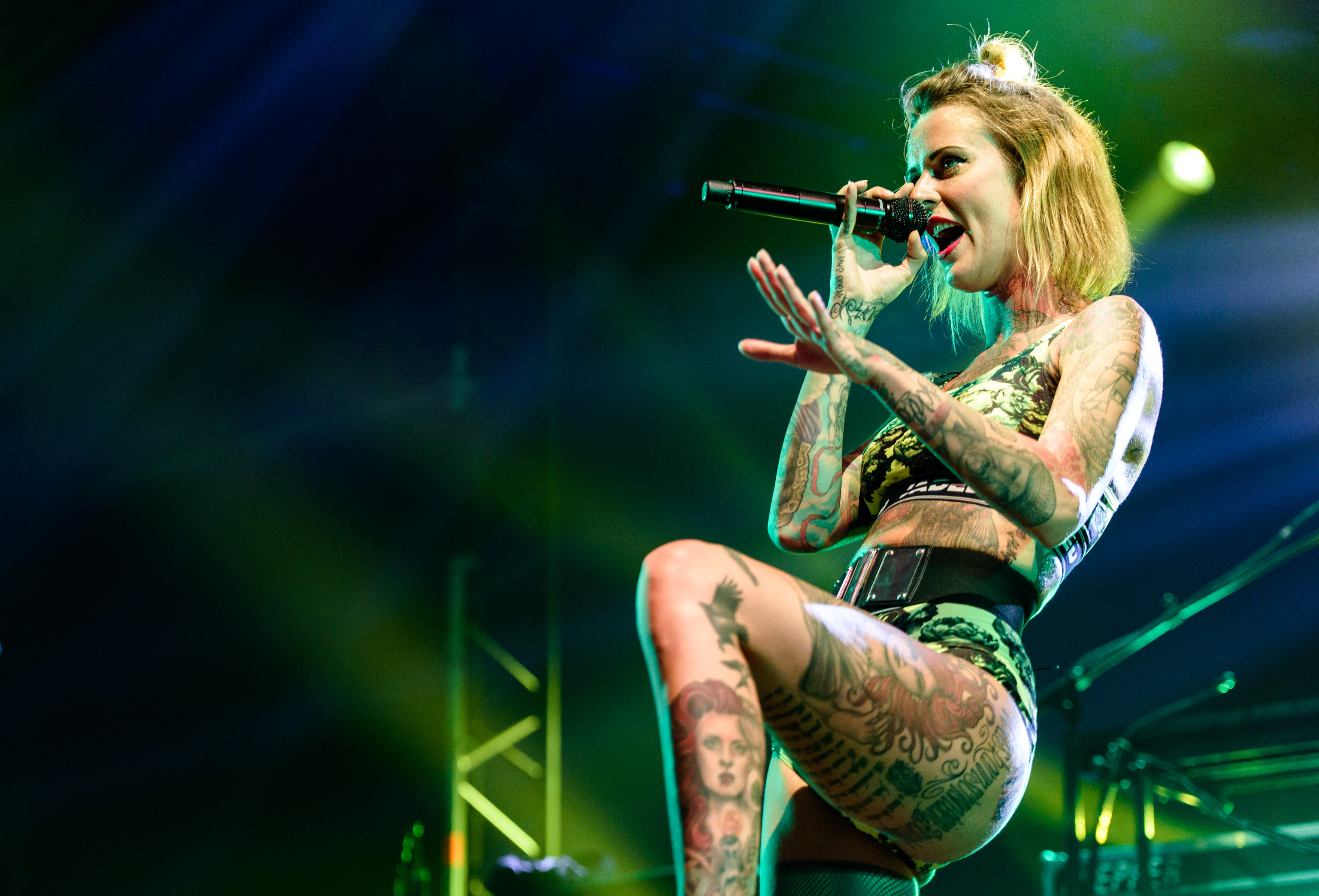
Jennifer Rostock Live 2015

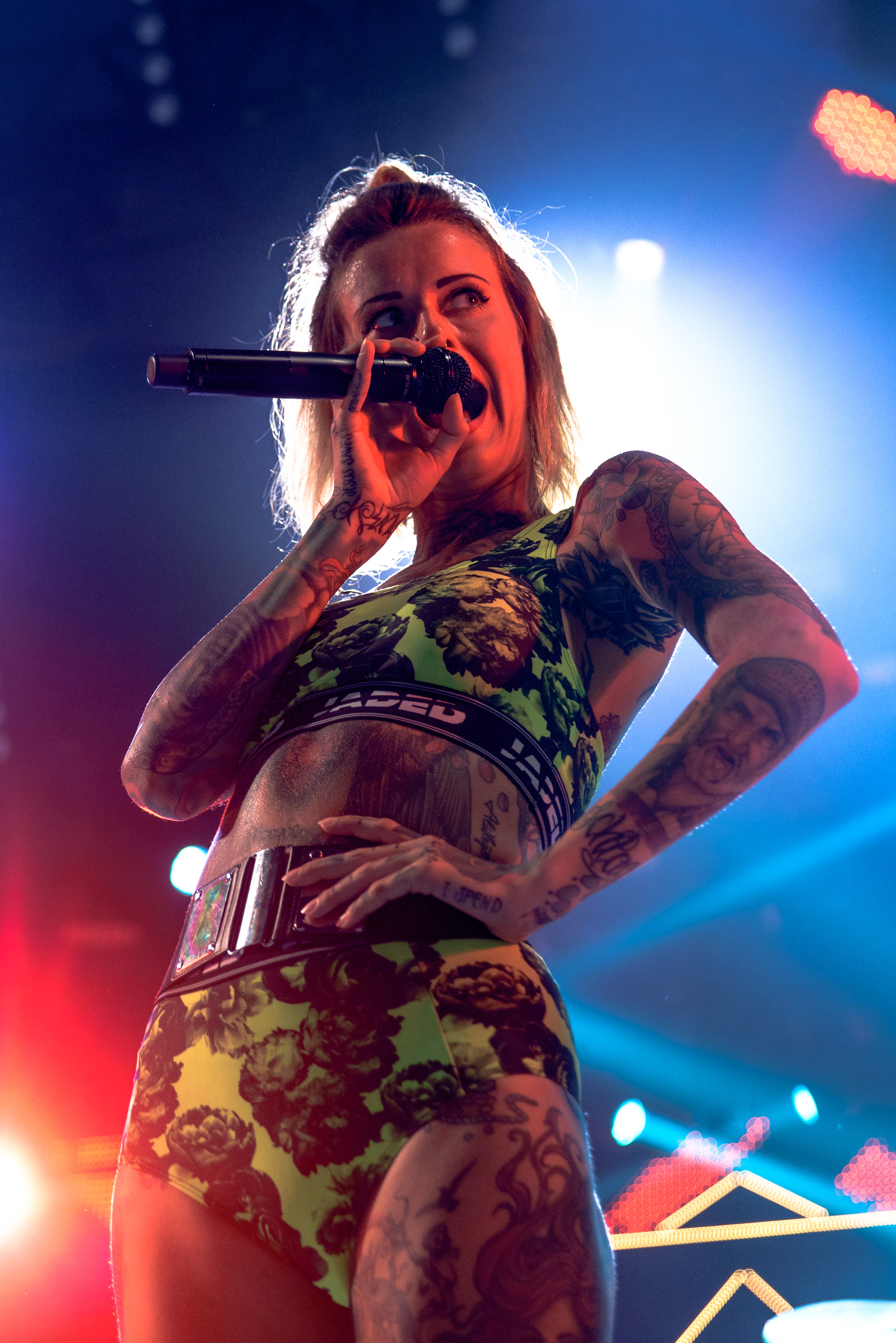
Jennifer Weist Live in Munich 2015

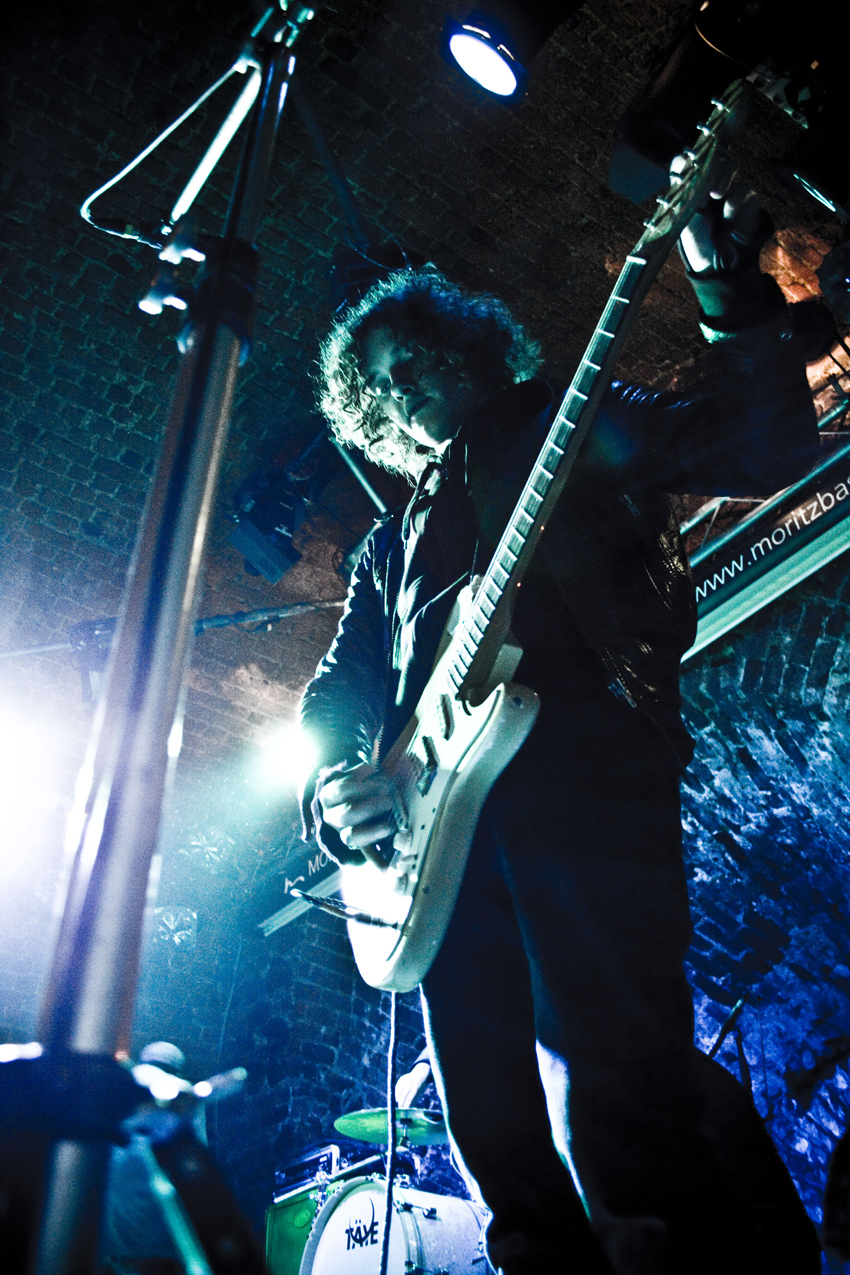
Alex Voigt

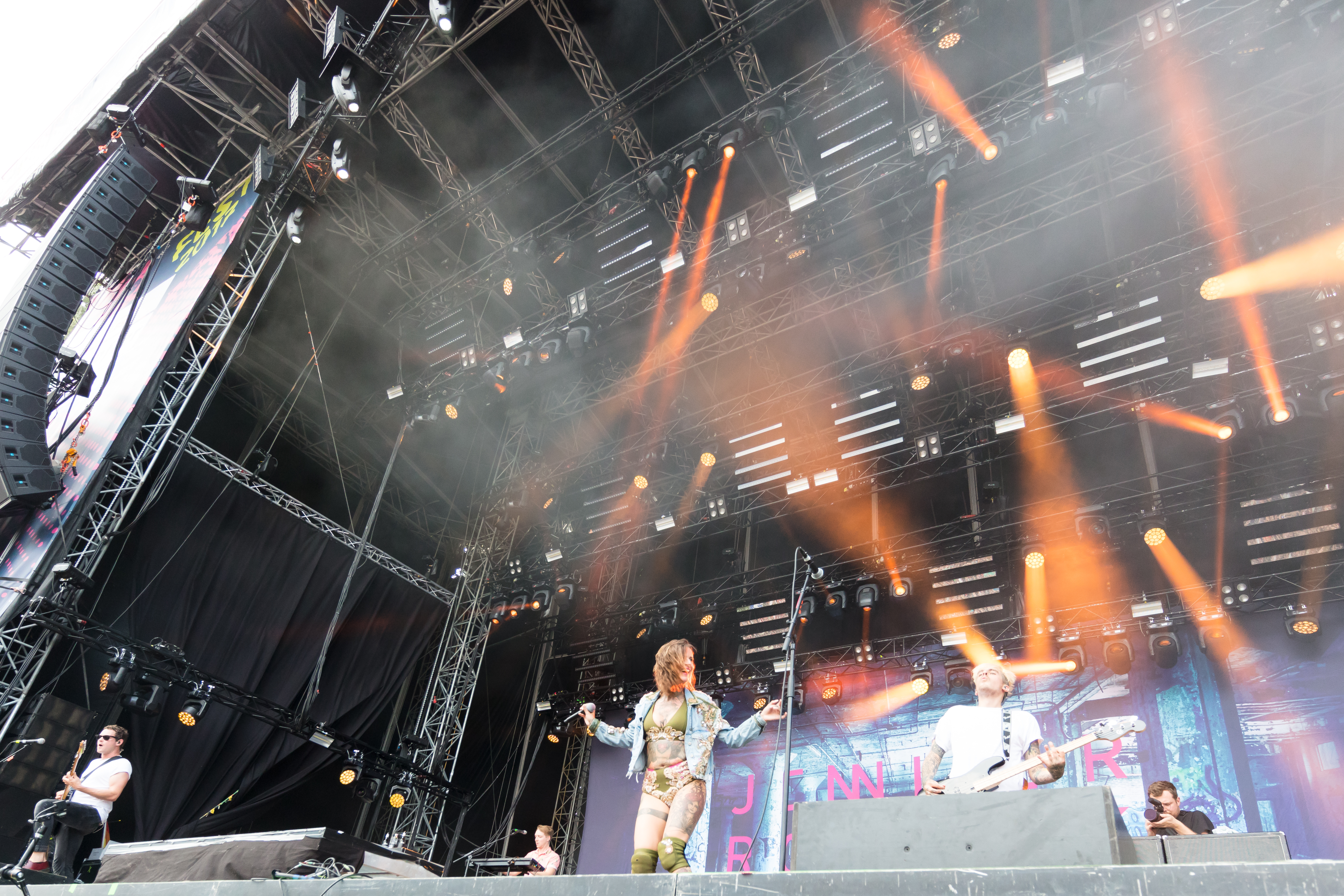
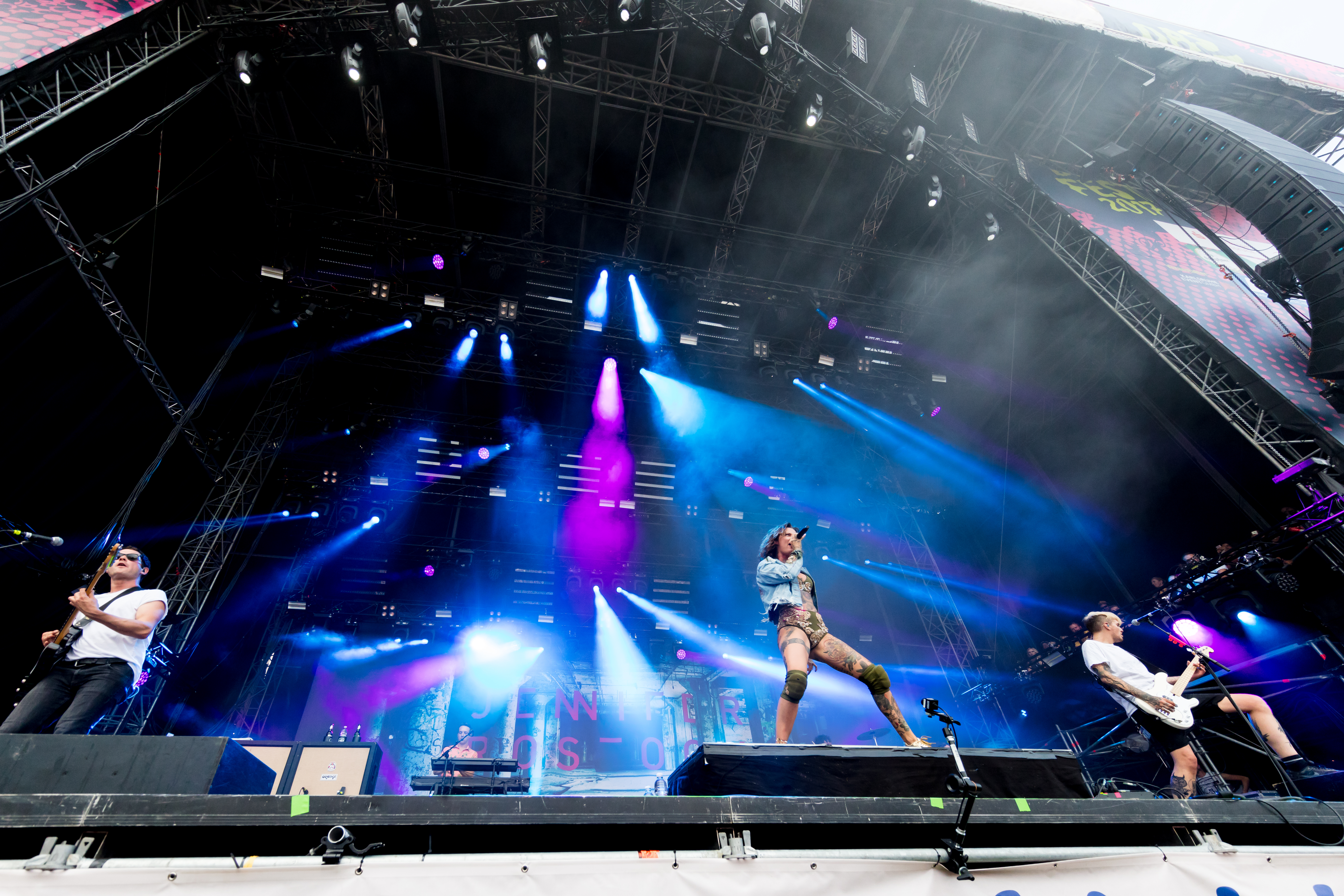
Jennifer Rostock performing in July 2017

=== Albums ===
Year	Title	Peak positions		
Year	Title	GER	AUT	SWI
2008	Ins Offene Messer: First studio album; Released: 15 February 2008; Format: CD	31	—	—
2008	Ins Offene Messer - Jetzt Noch Besser: Re-Release; Released: 28 November 2008; Format: CD + DVD	—	—	—
2009	Der Film: Second studio album; Released: 10 July 2009; Format: CD	13	18	63
2011	Mit Haut und Haar: Third studio album; Released: 29 July 2011; Format: CD	4	7	58
2012	Live in Berlin: Live album; Released: 10 August 2012; Format: CD + DVD	3	13	—
2014	Schlaflos: Fourth studio album; Released: 17 January 2014; Format: CD	2	5	40
2016	Genau in diesem Ton: Fifth studio album; Released: 9 September 2016; Format: CD	2	4	31
2017	Worst of Jennifer Rostock: Compilation album; Released: 29 September 2017; Format: CD	6	11	69
2018	Jennifer Rostock bleibt. (Live 2018): Live album; Released: 21 September 2018; Format: CD	2	11	—

=== Singles ===
Year	Single	Peak positions			Album
Year	Single	GER	AUT	SWI	Album
2008	"Kopf oder Zahl"	48	69	—	Ins offene Messer
2008	"Feuer"	—	24	—	Ins offene Messer
2008	"Himalaya"	85	—	—	Ins offene Messer
2009	"Du willst mir an die Wäsche"	34	70	—	Der Film
2009	"Es tut wieder weh"	48	—	—	New Moon (Soundtrack)
2010	"Irgendwo anders"	—	—	—	Der Film
2011	"Mein Mikrofon"	49	—	—	Mit Haut und Haar
2011	"Ich kann nicht mehr"	60	—	—	Mit Haut und Haar
2011	"Du willst mir an die Wäsche (feat. Sido)"	—	—	—	Live in Berlin
2013	"Ein Schmerz und eine Kehle"	—	—	—	Schlaflos
2013	"Phantombild"	—	—	—	Schlaflos
2014	"K.B.A.G."	—	—	—	Schlaflos
2014	"Du nimmst mir die Angst"	—	—	—	Schlaflos
2014	"Schlaflos"	—	—	—	Schlaflos
2014	"Kaleidoskop"	66	—	—	Kaleidoskop EP
2016	"Irgendwas ist immer"	—	—	—	Genau in diesem Ton
2016	"Wir sind alle nicht von hier"	—	—	—	Genau in diesem Ton
2016	"Uns gehört die Nacht"	—	—	—	Genau in diesem Ton
2016	"Wir waren hier"	—	—	—	Genau in diesem Ton
2016	"Hengstin"	—	—	—	Genau in diesem Ton
2017	"Deiche"	—	—	—	Genau in diesem Ton
2017	"Alles cool"	—	—	—	Worst of Jennifer Rostock
2017	"Haarspray"	—	—	—	Worst of Jennifer Rostock
2017	"Die guten alten Zeiten"	—	—	—	Worst of Jennifer Rostock
2026	"Wir schon wieder"	—	—	—	

=== EPs ===
- 2007: Ich Will Hier Raus
- 2014: Kaleidoskop
