= Überall zu Hause =

Studio album by Christina Stürmer
- Released: 21 September 2018
- Genres: Pop; pop rock
- Label: Polydor

Christina Stürmer chronology
Seite an Seite (2016)	Überall zu Hause (2018)

Überall zu Hause (English: At Home Everywhere) is the eighth studio album by Austrian recording artist Christina Stürmer. It was released by Polydor on 21 September 2018 in German-speaking Europe. In support of the album, Stürmer embarked on the Überall zu Hause Tour through Germany and Austria in 2019.

== Track listing ==
No.	Title	Length
1.	"Das ist das Leben"	3:27
2.	"In ein paar Jahren"	3:35
3.	"Du erinnerst mich an mein Herz"	3:52
4.	"Heiser vor Glück"	3:34
5.	"Jeder unserer Träume"	3:49
6.	"Fahrtwind"	3:36
7.	"Mount Everest"	3:34
8.	"Nochmal so tun"	3:25
9.	"Überall zu Hause"	3:20
10.	"Schere Stein Papier"	3:43
11.	"Zweimal so stark"	3:23
12.	"Du bist perfekt"	3:12
13.	"Freu dich nicht zu spät"	3:37

== Charts ==
=== Weekly charts ===
Chart (2018)	Peak position
Austrian Albums (Ö3 Austria)	1
German Albums (Offizielle Top 100)	7
Swiss Albums (Schweizer Hitparade)	21

=== Year-end charts ===
Chart (2018)	Position
Austrian Albums (Ö3 Austria)	49
