= Du Willst Mir An Die Wäsche =

2009 single by Jennifer Rostock

Single by Jennifer Rostock

from the album Der Film
- B-side: "Leben Auf Zeit"; "Schmutzig, Schmutzig!"
- Released: June 26, 2009
- Recorded: 2009
- Studio: Planet Roc (Berlin, Germany)
- Genre: Pop-Rock, Pop
- Length: 3:31
- Label: Warner Music Germany
- Songwriters: Jennifer Weist, Johannes Walter
- Producers: Werner Krumme, Christian Bader

Jennifer Rostock singles chronology
"Himalaya" (2009)	"Du Willst Mir An Die Wäsche" (2009)	"Es Tut Wieder Weh" (2009)

"Du Willst Mir An Die Wäsche" (engl. "You Want To Get At My Undies") is a song by German alternative band Jennifer Rostock, and was released as the lead single from their second studio album Der Film on June 26, 2009. The song has peaked at #34 of the German Singles Chart and at #44 of the Austrian Singles Chart. The song was written by Jennifer Weist and Johannes Walter and produced by Werner Krumme and Christian Bader.

== Track listing/formats ==
Physical Single
No.	Title	Length
1.	"Du Willst Mir An Die Wäsche"	3:31
2.	"Leben Auf Zeit"	3:09
3.	"Schmutzig, Schmutzig!"	2:17
4.	"Du Willst Mir An Die Wäsche" (Jake The Rapper & Javier Logares Remix)	7:28
5.	"Du Willst Mir An Die Wäsche" (Radio Version)	3:14
6.	"Du Willst Mir An Die Wäsche" (Karaoke Version)	3:14
7.	"Du Willst Mir An Die Wäsche" (Music Video)	3:31
8.	"Der Film – Track By Track"	-

Digital Single
No.	Title	Length
1.	"Du Willst Mir An Die Wäsche"	3:31
2.	"Leben Auf Zeit"	3:09
3.	"Schmutzig, Schmutzig!"	2:17
4.	"Du Willst Mir An Die Wäsche" (Radio Version)	3:14

2-Track Single
No.	Title	Length
1.	"Du Willst Mir An Die Wäsche"	3:31
2.	"Schmutzig, Schmutzig!"	2:17

== Music video ==
The music video for "Du Willst Mir An Die Wäsche" was directed by Uwe Flade and had its premiere on the band's website on June 6, 2009 and shows the band in a cinema playing visitors and staff. The movie in the cinema shows the band’s members in different movie scenes. Jennifer plays a super heroine, Baku is portrayed as Wolverine, Christoph as a mummy, Alex as a gangland leader and Joe as a Dr. Evil adaption.

== Chart performance ==
Year	Title	Chart Positions		
Year	Title	GER	AUT	SWI
2009	"Du Willst Mir An Die Wäsche"	34	44	-

== Personnel ==
- Jennifer Weist - Vocals
- Johannes "Joe" Walter - Keyboard
- Alex Voigt - Guitar
- Christoph Deckert - Bass
- Christopher "Baku" Kohl - Drums
