= Ich hör auf mein Herz =

Studio album by Christina Stürmer
- Released: 19 April 2013
- Genre: Pop; pop rock
- Label: Polydor
- Producer: Christian Neander; David Jürgens

Christina Stürmer chronology
| Nahaufnahme (2010) | Ich hör auf mein Herz (2013) | Seite an Seite (2016) |

Ich hör auf mein Herz (English: I Listen to My Heart) is the sixth studio album by Austrian recording artist Christina Stürmer. It was released by Polydor Records on 19 April 2013 in German-speaking Europe.

== Track listing ==
| No. | Title | Writer(s) | Length |
|---|---|---|---|
| 1. | "Auf und davon" | Ali Zuckowski; David-Christopher Jürgens; Marek Cwiertnia | 3:05 |
| 2. | "Ich hör auf mein Herz" | Stürmer; Christian Neander; Oliver Varga; Tobias Röger | 3:26 |
| 3. | "Millionen Lichter" | Röger | 3:49 |
| 4. | "Himmel ins All" | Heike Kospach; Sebastian Kirchner; Alexander Freund | 4:11 |
| 5. | "Selbe Wellenlänge" | Röger | 3:24 |
| 6. | "Herz in der Hand" | Christoph Koterzina; Markus Schlichtherle | 4:14 |
| 7. | "Was machst Du wenn die Stadt schläft" | Neander; Jürgens; Cwiertnia | 3:22 |
| 8. | "Amelie" | Stürmer; Varga; Koterzina; Schlichtherle | 3:02 |
| 9. | "Unendlich" | Balk; Röger | 3:32 |
| 10. | "Wieviel wiegt ein Herzschlag" | Diane Weigmann; Johannes Walter; Matthias Max | 3:50 |
| 11. | "Weltbewegend" | Tom Albrecht; Niko Floss | 3:28 |
| 12. | "Ohne Dich (ist alles nichts)" | Stürmer; Varga; Koterzina; Schlichtherle | 3:59 |
| 13. | "Bang Bang" | Mutzke; Kersting; Rüger; Davidian | 3:26 |

== Charts ==
=== Weekly charts ===
| Chart (2013) | Peak position |
|---|---|
| Austrian Albums (Ö3 Austria) | 1 |
| German Albums (Offizielle Top 100) | 4 |
| Swiss Albums (Schweizer Hitparade) | 20 |

=== Year-end charts ===
| Chart (2013) | Position |
|---|---|
| Austrian Albums (Ö3 Austria) | 67 |
| German Albums (Offizielle Top 100) | 87 |

== Certifications ==
| Region | Certification | Certified units/sales |
|---|---|---|
| Austria (IFPI Austria) | Platinum | 15,000^{*} |
| Germany (BVMI) | Gold | 100,000^{^} |
^{*} Sales figures based on certification alone.^{^} Shipments figures based on certification alone.
