= Wirklich alles! =

Live album by Christina Stürmer
- Released: 17 May 2005
- Recorded: Vienna, 20 November 2004
- Genre: Pop/rock
- Length: 1:55:31
- Label: Polydor Records

Christina Stürmer chronology
Soll das wirklich alles sein (2004)	''Wirklich alles!'' (2005)	Schwarz Weiss (2005)

Wirklich alles! is a live album from Christina Stürmer, released in 2005. It was recorded during a tour in Austria called Wirklich alles! during the fall of 2004, in promotion of her album Soll das wirklich alles sein.

It was not as successful as her studio albums have been.

The album was certified Platinum in Austria.

== Track listing ==
CD 1

1. Intro
2. Geh Nicht Wenn Du Kommst
3. Wir Halten Jetzt Die Welt An
4. E.T.
5. Soll Das Wirklich Alles Sein?
6. Hier Bin Ich
7. Disco
8. Glücklich
9. Weisst Du Wohin Wir Gehen?
10. Rebellen Der Sonne
11. Bus Durch London
12. Worte In Schwarz-Weiss
13. So Wie Ich Bin
14. Zieh' Dir Doch Nen Anzug An
15. Mehr Waffen, Mehr Feinde

CD2

1. Mama (Ana Ahabak)
2. Kind Des Universums
3. Engel Fliegen Einsam
4. Wo Ist Deine Liebe?
5. Spieglein...
6. Geh Raus Aus Meinem Kopf
7. Märchen
8. Liebt Sie Dich So Wie Ich?
9. Ich Lebe
10. Keine Schule
11. Immer An Euch Geglaubt
12. Vorbei
13. Glücklich (Studio Version) (Bonus Track)

== Charts ==
Charts (2005)	Peak position
AT	3
