= Soll das wirklich alles sein? =

Soll das Wirklich alles sein?

Studio album by Christina Stürmer
- Released: 8 June 2004
- Genre: Pop; pop rock
- Length: 59:29
- Label: Amadeo; Universal
- Producer: Alexander Kahr

Christina Stürmer chronology
Freier Fall (2003)	Soll das Wirklich alles sein? (2004)	Wirklich Alles! (2005)

Singles from Soll das wirklich alles sein?
- 1. "Vorbei" Released: 3 May 2004; 2. "Bus durch London" Released: 16 August 2004; 3. "Weißt du wohin wir gehen" Released: 8 November 2004; 4. "Liebt sie dich so wie ich?" Released: 21 February 2005

Soll das wirklich alles sein? (English: Is That Really All?) is the second studio album by Austrian recording artist Christina Stürmer. It was released by Universal Music subsidiary Amadeo on 8 June 2004 in Austria. As with her debut album Freier Fall (2003), Stürmer worked with Alexander Kahr on most of the album. Upon its release, Soll das wirklich alles sein? became her second number-one album and the fourth highest-selling album of the year in Austria. It was eventually certified 3× Platinum the International Federation of the Phonographic Industry (IFPI), indicating sales in excess of 90,000 copies.

== Track listing ==
No.	Title	Writer(s)	Length
1.	"Bus durch London"	Maya Singh	3:42
2.	"Geh raus aus meinem Kopf"	Lindau Lüder	3:45
3.	"Vielleicht auch nicht"	Christian Lohr; Singh	3:06
4.	"Kind des Universums"	Lohr; Singh	4:26
5.	"Wir halten jetzt die Welt an"	Frank Lebel; Raphael Kirchner; Bob Gutdeutsch	3:28
6.	"E.T."	Hannes Strasser	4:20
7.	"Märchen"	Andreas Freund; Wolfgang Laab	3:44
8.	"Immer an euch geglaubt"	Singh; Alexander Kahr; Robert Pfluger; Christian A. Konrad; Bernhard Lassl	3:48
9.	"Liebt sie dich so wie ich?"	Kurt Keinrath; Peter Wessely	3:25
10.	"Soll das wirklich alles sein"	Strasser	3:54
11.	"Eintagsfliege"	Kahr; Maria Zenon	4:08
12.	"Vorbei"	Hanno Bruhn	3:12
13.	"Arzt"	Frank Ramond	3:05
14.	"Mr. President"	Kahr; Pfluger	3:41
15.	"Supermarkt"	Freund; Laab	3:06
16.	"Weißt du wohin wir gehen"	Kahr; Pfluger	4:02

== Charts ==
=== Weekly charts ===
Chart (2004)	Peak position
Austrian Albums (Ö3 Austria)	1

=== Year-end charts ===
Chart (2004)	Position
Austrian Albums (Ö3 Austria)	4

== Certifications ==
Region	Certification	Certified units/sales
Austria (IFPI Austria)	3× Platinum	90,000^{*}
^{*} Sales figures based on certification alone.
