= Nie genug =

Single by Christina Stürmer

from the album Lebe Lauter
- Released: 28 April 2006
- Venue: Beaches of Cabo de Gata, Almeria, Spain;
- Genre: Pop rock
- Length: 3:32
- Label: Polyor
- Songwriter(s): Thorsten Brötzmann; Alex Geringas; Ivo Mohring
- Producer(s): Thorsten Brötzmann

Christina Stürmer singles chronology
"Immer an euch geglaubt" (2006)	"Nie genug" (2006)	"Um bei dir zu sein" / "An Sommertagen" (2006)

"Nie genug" (English: "Never Enough") is a song by Austrian recording artist Christina Stürmer. It was written by Thorsten Brötzmann, Alex Geringas, and Ivo Mohring for her third album, Lebe lauter (2006), while production was overseen by the former.

== Music video ==
The music video starts off with Stürmer singing live with her band on a beach of the Mediterranean Sea. Shots of her walking down a road, with a truck following behind her are shown. Scenes of Stürmer singing on rocks by the beach are shown. As the chorus starts for the second time, Stürmer begins running down the road, and the truck continues to follow her. By the end of the video, Stürmer stops running, and the rest of the band who are in the truck pull her onto it. The truck was rented by Event Film Cars Spain, the largest picture vehicle provider in Spain.

== Charts ==
=== Weekly charts ===
Chart (2006)	Peak position
Austria (Ö3 Austria Top 40)	1
Germany (GfK)	15
Switzerland (Schweizer Hitparade)	35

=== Year-end charts ===
Chart (2003)	Position
Austria (Ö3 Austria Top 40)	5
Germany (Official German Charts)	81
