= Freier Fall =

Studio album by Christina Stürmer
- Released: 16 June 2003
- Recorded: 2003
- Genre: Pop; pop rock
- Length: 41:51
- Label: Amadeo; Universal
- Producer: Alexander Kahr

Christina Stürmer chronology
Freier Fall (2003)	Soll das wirklich alles sein? (2004)

Singles from Freier Fall
- 1. "Ich lebe" Released: 24 March 2003; 2. "Geh nicht wenn du kommst" Released: 11 August 2003; 3. "Mama (Ana Ahabak)" Released: 17 November 2003

Freier Fall (English: Free Fall) is the debut studio album by Austrian recording artist Christina Stürmer. Recorded after her participation in the ORF 1 talent show Starmania, where she had finished runner-up, it was released by Amadeo, a Universal Music subsidiary, on 16 June 2003 in Austria. Upon its release, it became one of the most successful debuts in years, reaching number-one on the Austrian Albums Chart and finishing second on the Ö3 Austria year-end chart. It was eventually certified 4× Platinum by the International Federation of the Phonographic Industry (IFPI), indicating sales in excess of 120,000 copies.

== Track listing ==
No.	Title	Writer(s)	Length
1.	"Geh nicht wenn du kommst"	Hannes Strasser	4:04
2.	"S/W"	Alexander Kahr; Robert Pfluger; David Young; Shannon Penn	3:42
3.	"Anzug" (featuring Boris)	Kahr; Pfluger	3:31
4.	"Mama (Ana Ahabak)"	Kahr; Pfluger	3:55
5.	"Rebellen der Sonne"	Kahr; Eva Kraus; Harald Hanisch; Leopold Zillinger	3:20
6.	"Astronaut"	Kahr; Pfluger	3:02
7.	"Spieglein"	Kahr; Kraus; Hanisch; Zillinger	3:12
8.	"Engel fliegen einsam"	Maya Singh; Hannes Strasser	3:16
9.	"Mehr Waffen"	Andreas Freund; David Pross	3:48
10.	"Hier bin ich"	Freund; Wolfgang Laab	3:16
11.	"Wo ist deine Liebe?"	Freund; Laab	3:14
12.	"Ich lebe"	Kahr; Kraus; Hanisch; Zillinger	3:26

== Charts ==
=== Weekly charts ===
Chart (2003)	Peak position
Austrian Albums (Ö3 Austria)	1

=== Year-end charts ===
Chart (2003)	Position
Austrian Albums (Ö3 Austria)	2

== Certifications ==
Region	Certification	Certified units/sales
Austria (IFPI Austria)	4× Platinum	120,000^{*}
^{*} Sales figures based on certification alone.
