= Der Film =

Studio album by Jennifer Rostock
- Released: July 10, 2009
- Recorded: 2008–2009
- Studios: Planet Roc (Berlin, Germany)
- Genres: Pop, pop rock, electropop, alternative
- Length: 46:02 (Standard Version)
- Label: Warner Music Germany
- Producers: Werner Krumme, Christian Bader

Jennifer Rostock chronology
Ins Offene Messer (2008)	Der Film (2009)	Mit Haut Und Haar (2011)

Singles from Der Film
- 1. "Du Willst Mir An Die Wäsche" Released: June 26, 2009; 2. "Irgendwo Anders" Released: May 14, 2010

Professional ratings
Review scores
Source	Rating
Laut.de	2/5 stars
CDStarts.de	6.5/10 stars

Der Film (engl. The Film) is the second studio album by German punk rock band Jennifer Rostock. It was released on July 10, 2009. The album's lead single, "Du Willst Mir An Die Wäsche", was released on June 26, 2009, and peaked at #34 of the German Albums Chart.

== Track listing ==
All songs written by Jennifer Weist and Johannes "Joe" Walter.

No.	Title	Length
1.	"Vorspann"	2:01
2.	"Wieder Geht's Von Vorne Los"	2:41
3.	"Leben Auf Zeit"	3:10
4.	"Mach Mich Nicht Verliebt"	3:05
5.	"Wo Willst Du Hin?"	4:00
6.	"Du Willst Mir An Die Wäsche"	3:30
7.	"Schmutzig! Schmutzig!"	2:15
8.	"Jung & Schön"	2:46
9.	"Nenn Mich Nicht Jenny"	3:55
10.	"Der Gärtner"	3:18
11.	"Paris"	3:09
12.	"Oh Cowboy"	2:06
13.	"Heul Doch!"	4:28
14.	"Irgendwo Anders"	3:42
15.	"Abspann"	1:56
Total length:		46:02

Amazon bonus track:
No.	Title	Length
16.	"Himalaya" (Acoustic Version)	2:35

== Deluxe edition ==
Simultaneously to the release of the Der Film a limited fan edition of the album was released including:

- A set of buttons
- A poster
- A casual bag
- A 25-minute preview of the band-documentation "Es gibt nichts zu sehen, bitte sehen Sie her!" by Hannes Rossacher.

== Chart performance ==
=== Album ===
Country	Peak position
Germany	13
Austria	18
Switzerland	63

=== Singles ===
Year	Title	Chart position	
Year	Title	GER	AUT
2009	"Du Willst Mir An Die Wäsche"	34	70
