= Scherbenmeer =

Single by Christina Stürmer

from the album Lebe Lauter
- B-side: "Keine Zeit zum Schlafengehen"
- Released: (Austria) (Germany) (Switzerland) March 2, 2007
- Recorded: 2006
- Genre: Rock
- Length: 3:54
- Label: Polydor Records
- Songwriters: Tom Albrecht, Marc Kaschke, Dior da Silva
- Producer: Thorsten Brötzmann

Christina Stürmer singles chronology
| "Ohne Dich" (2007) | "Scherbenmeer" (2007) | "Augenblick am Tag" (2007) |

"Scherbenmeer" is the fourth single off Christina Stürmer's fourth album, Lebe Lauter. The song was released in Austria, Germany, Switzerland, and throughout the European Union.

== Music video ==
The music video starts with Stürmer lying on a dirty bed in an old apartment. Scenes of her singing throughout hanging curtains are shown. Shots are shown of her singing live in the apartment. As the chorus starts, Stürmer throws a picture at the wall, shattering it. Shots of Stürmer singing on broken pieces of glass are shown. As the bridge starts, Stürmer walks into the kitchen, where two members of her band are eating. Stürmer is then shown with her band in the living room, and as the chorus starts for the second time, she kicks the coffee table in frustration, knocking everything on it down. Towards the end of the song, Stürmer is shown sitting at a table in an empty room. She then grabs a bat and smashes a piece of glass into pieces. Scenes of her back in the kitchen are shown throwing her plates, slamming the table, and then getting up and throwing her chair against the wall. Stürmer is then shown singing live and throwing random things around the apartment. Throughout the video, Stürmer is shown taking pictures of her and members of her band.

== Chart performance ==
| Country | Peak position |
|---|---|
| Austria | 6 |
| Germany | 16 |
| Switzerland | 59 |
| European Union | 77 |
