= Fieber (Christina Stürmer song) =

Single by Christina Stürmer

from the album laut-Los
- Released: (Austria) 16 May 2008 (Germany) (Switzerland) 23 May 2008
- Genre: Rock
- Length: 3:29
- Label: Universal Music
- Songwriter(s): Oliver Varga, Jonathan Walter
- Producer(s): Thorsten Brötzmann

Christina Stürmer singles chronology
"Träume leben ewig" (2008)	"Fieber" (2008)	"Ist mir egal" (2009)

"Fieber" is the title of the "Austrian Song for the UEFA EURO 2008" by Christina Stürmer. The song was released on 23 May 2008. The song is on Stürmer's album laut-Los. It reached no.6 in the Austrian chart and no.11 in the German charts.

== Music video ==
The music video for "Fieber" shows Stürmer sitting outside watching the soccer game, and throughout the video, other sports fans join her and by the end of the video she has a crowd with her watching the game.

== Charts ==
Chart (2008)	Position
Austria (Ö3 Austria Top 40)	6
Germany (GfK)	11
Switzerland (Schweizer Hitparade)	92
