= Ins Offene Messer =

Ins offene Messer

Studio album by Jennifer Rostock
- Released: 15 February 2008; 28 November 2008 (Re-release)
- Studios: Planet Roc (Berlin, Germany)
- Genres: Rock, punk, pop rock, electropop
- Length: 41:21
- Language: German
- Label: Warner Music Germany
- Producers: Werner Krumme, Christian Bader

Jennifer Rostock chronology
Ich will hier raus (EP) (2007)	Ins offene Messer (2008)	Der Film (2009)

Re-Release Cover
- Ins offene Messer – Jetzt noch besser Cover

Singles from Ins offene Messer
- 1. "Kopf oder Zahl?" Released: 1 February 2008; 2. "Feuer" Released: 13 June 2008; 3. "Himalaya" Released: 21 November 2008

Professional ratings
Review scores
Source	Rating
Laut.de	3/5 stars
CDStarts.de	8/10 stars
MonstersAndCritics.de	(Positive)
Pooltrax.com	(Positive)

Ins offene Messer (engl. Right Into The Trap) is the debut album by German pop-punk band Jennifer Rostock. It was released on 15 February 2008 and produced by Werner Krumme and Christian Bader. The album's lead single, "Kopf Oder Zahl?", was released on 1 February 2008. The song was participating in the Bundesvision Song Contest and reached the fifth place. The album was re-released under the name Ins offene Messer – Jetzt Noch Besser on 28 November 2008.

== Track listing ==
All songs written by Jennifer Weist and Johannes "Joe" Walter.

No.	Title	Length
1.	"Feuer"	3:03
2.	"Kopf oder Zahl?"	2:22
3.	"Blut geleckt"	2:47
4.	"Nichts tät ich lieber"	2:34
5.	"Drahtseiltakt"	3:26
6.	"Gedanken, die man besser nicht denkt"	3:45
7.	"Tier in dir"	3:45
8.	"Wer hätte das Gedacht?"	1:35
9.	"Mein Parfum"	3:42
10.	"Kind von dir"	3:21
11.	"Diadem"	2:21
12.	"Mona Lisa"	2:31
13.	"Himalaya"	3:38
14.	"Ich will hier raus"	2:44
15.	"Kopf oder Zahl?" (Video)	2:31
Total length:		41:21

== Ins offene Messer - Jetzt noch besser ==
The album was re-released as Ins offene Messer - Jetzt noch besser on 28 November 2008. It contains additional songs, remixes and acoustic versions as well as a bonus DVD with documentary videos of the band, music videos and the video shoot to "Himalaya".

Additional Tracks To Ins offene Messer
No.	Title	Length
15.	"Kopf oder Zahl?" (Unplugged)	2:16
16.	"Himalaya" (Unplugged)	2:34
17.	"Ich will hier raus" (Unplugged)	2:40
18.	"Mongoloid"	1:32
19.	"Glühwein"	1:36
20.	"Wer hätte das gedacht?" (Live)	1:45
21.	"Gedanken, die man besser nicht denkt" (Live)	4:06
22.	"Feuer" (Live)	3:19
23.	"Kopf oder Zahl?" (Deichkind Remix)	5:27
24.	"Feuer" (Mattes Remix Edit)	5:08
25.	"Himalaya" (DAS BO & King Chronic Remix)	5:36

Bonus DVD
No.	Title	Length
1.	"Ein Tag mit Jennifer Rostock"	16:28
2.	"Bandkamera"	1:01:20
3.	"Live at MTV Campus Invasion"	45:29
4.	"Himalaya" (Video)	3:37
5.	"Making Of - Himalaya"	4:02
6.	"Feuer" (Video)	3:04
7.	"Kopf oder Zahl?" (Video)	2:31

== Chart performance ==
=== Album ===
Country	Peak position
Germany	31

=== Singles ===
Year	Title	Chart position	
Year	Title	GER	AT
2008	"Kopf oder Zahl?"	48	69
2008	"Feuer"	-	24
2008	"Himalaya"	85	-

== Ins offene Messer Tour ==
Ins offene Messer Tour
- Tour by Jennifer Rostock
- Location: Germany
- Associated album: Ins offene Messer
- Start date: 26 January 2008
- End date: 25 October 2009
- No. of shows: 32

Jennifer Rostock concert chronology
- Ins offene Messer Tour (2008); Der Filmriss (2009/2010)

The Ins offene Messer Tour by Jennifer Rostock started in January 2008 and ended in October. The band played over 30 shows in Karlsruhe, Frankfurt, Köln and Jena.

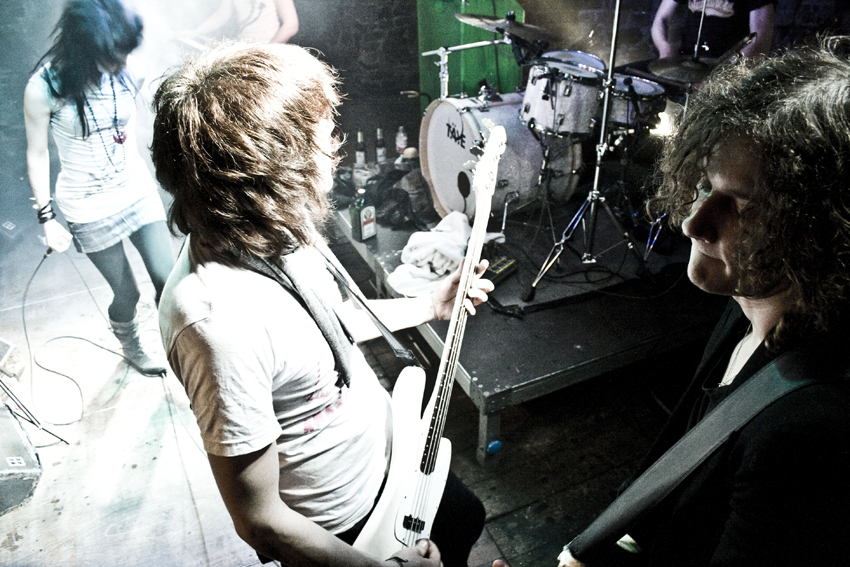

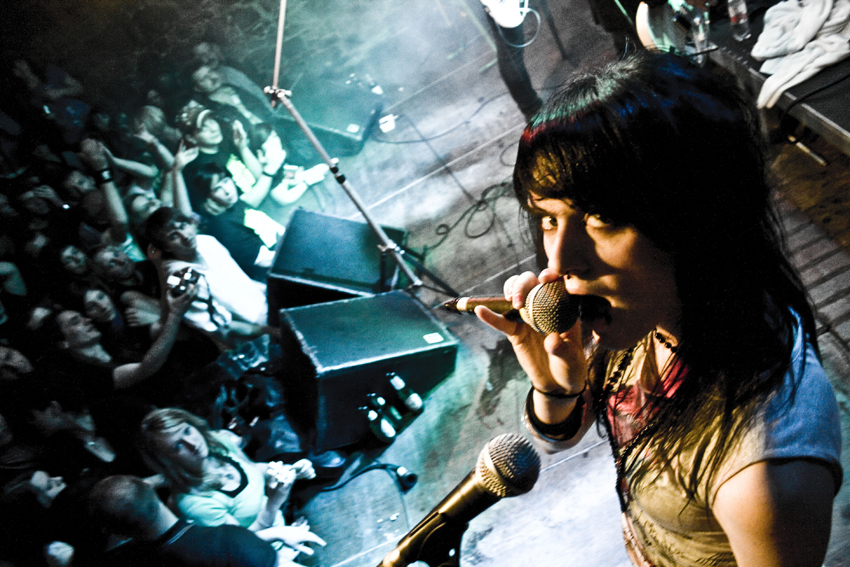

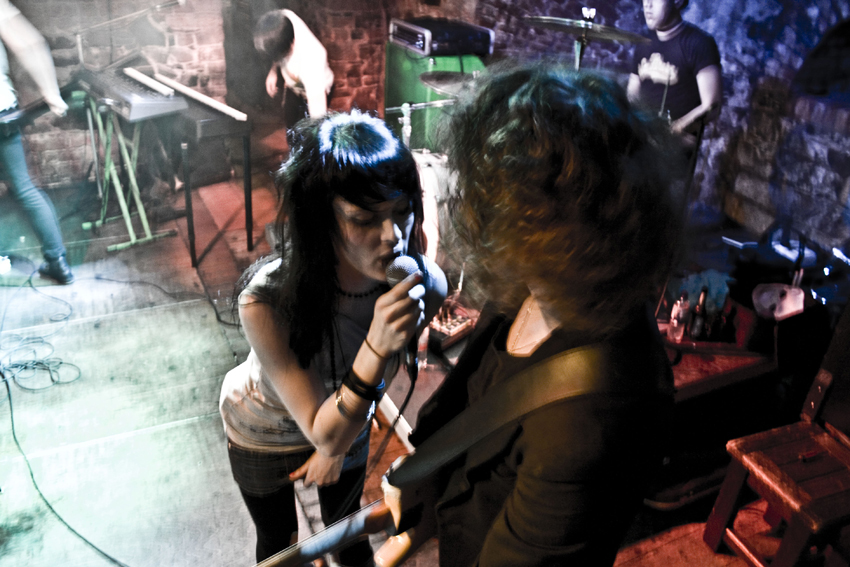

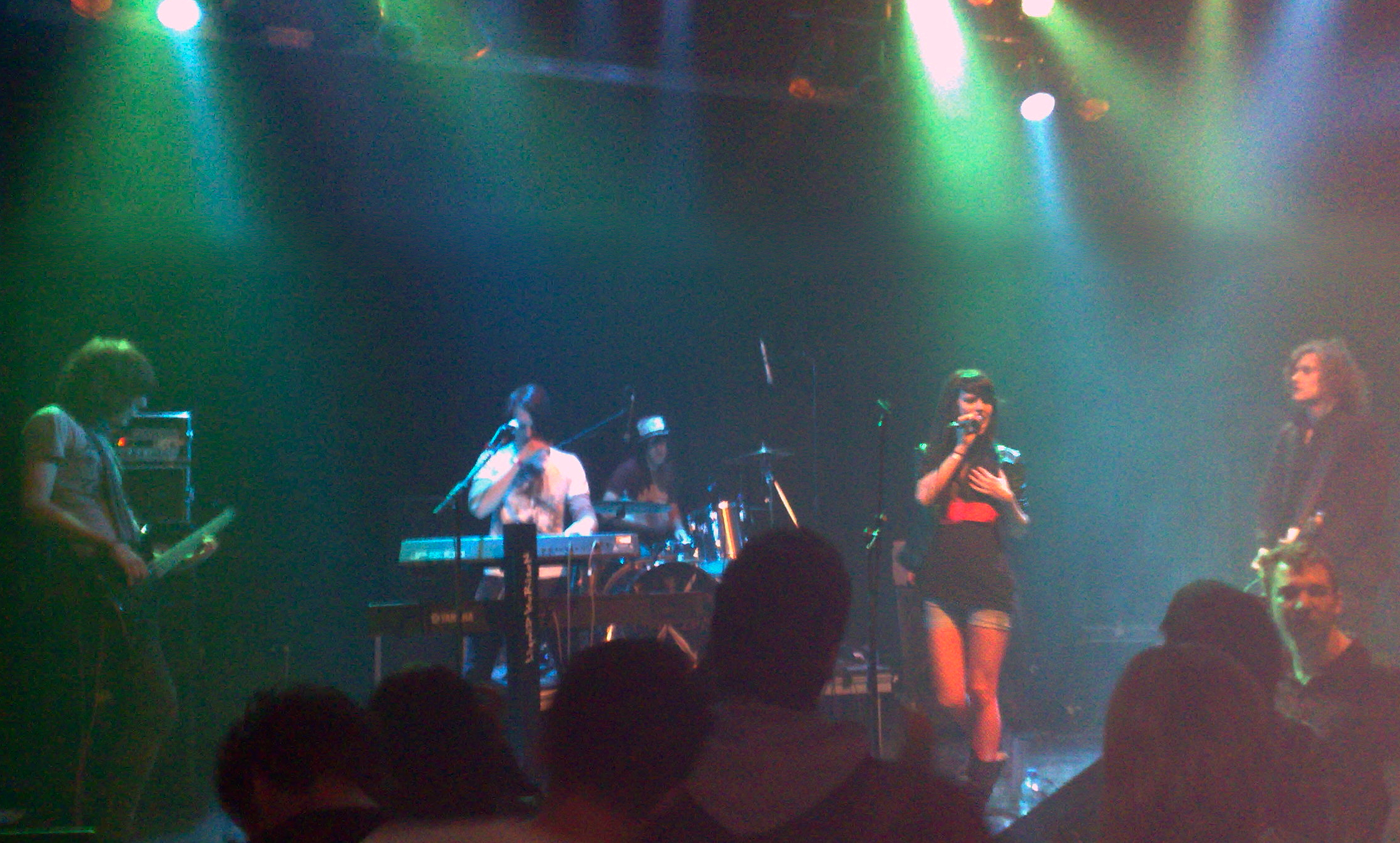

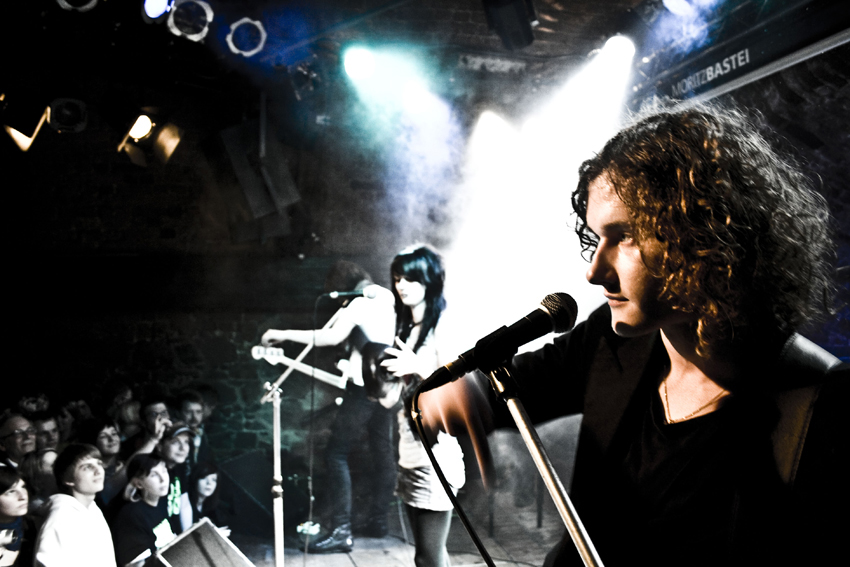

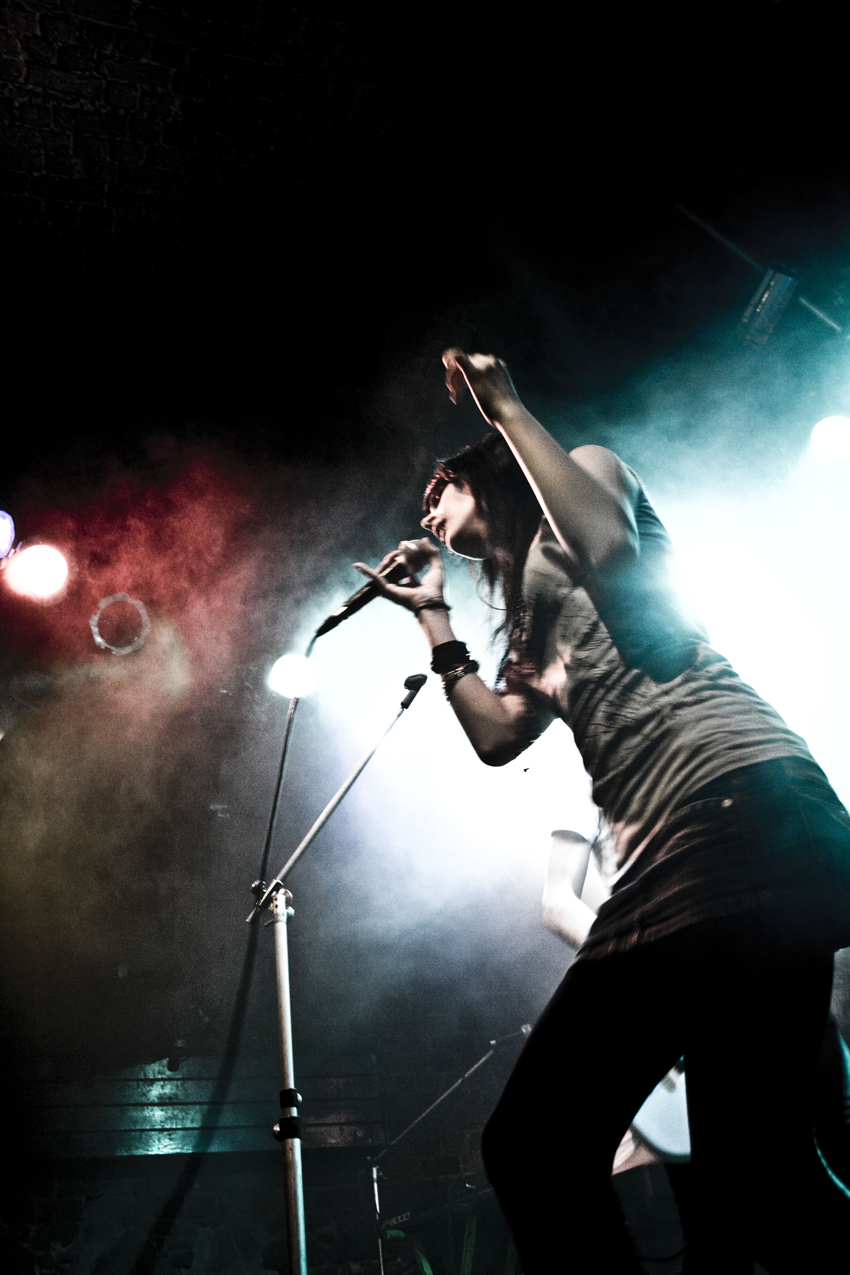
