= Lebe lauter =

Studio album by Christina Stürmer
- Released: 15 September 2006
- Genre: Pop; pop rock
- Length: 49:38
- Label: Polydor
- Producer: Thorsten Brötzmann

Christina Stürmer chronology
| Schwarz Weiss (2005) | Lebe lauter (2006) | laut-Los (2008) |

Singles from Lebe lauter
- 1. "Nie genug" Released: 28 April 2006; 2. "Um bei dir zu sein/An Sommertagen" Released: 18 August 2006; 3. "Ohne Dich" Released: 1 December 2006; 4. "Scherbenmeer" Released: 2 March 2007; 5. "Augenblick am Tag" Released: 15 June 2007; 6. "Um bei dir zu sein" Released: 3 August 2007; 7. "Mitten Unterm Jahr" Released: 16 November 2007

Professional ratings
Review scores
| Source | Rating |
|---|---|
| Allmusic | 3.5/5 stars |

Lebe lauter (English: Live Louder) is the third studio album by Austrian recording artist Christina Stürmer. It was released by Polydor Records on 15 September 2006 in German-speaking Europe. After the success of her international debut Schwarz Weiss (2005), Stürmer collaborated with producer Thorsten Brötzmann on most songs. Another major success, it became her third album to debut on top of the Austrian Albums Chart and her first to do so in Germany. Lebe lauter was eventually certified 2× Platinum in Austria, and Gold in Switzerland. The songs "Nie genug", "Um bei dir zu sein", and "Ohne Dich" from this album were released as singles.

== Release ==
The single "An Sommertagen" was released alongside another single, "Um bei dir zu sein", on 18 August 2006. Together, they were the second single from the album. Translated, Um bei dir zu sein means "To Be at Your Side", and An Sommertagen means "On Summer Days". The single was certified Gold in Austria. "Um bei dir zu sein"/"An Sommertagen" was originally only released in Austria as a double A-side single. Together, they reached number one on the Austrian single chart. No music video was made for "An Sommertagen", but "Um bei dir zu sein" was later released as the sixth single from the same album in Germany and a video was made for it.

The third single, "Ohne dich", was released on 1 December 2006. The song was accompanied by a music video, which starts with Stürmer on a boat in the middle of a lake. Her band members are shown up close playing the guitar. Throughout the video, shots of Stürmer on the boat are shown. "Ohne dich" was released in Austria, Germany, and Switzerland. It reached number eight in the charts in Austria, number thirty-three in Germany, and number forty-seven in Switzerland.

"Augenblick am Tag", the fifth single, was released on June 15, 2007. "Augenblick am Tag" was only released in Austria and reached number 29 on the charts.

== Track listing ==
| No. | Title | Writer(s) | Length |
|---|---|---|---|
| 1. | "Nie genug" | Thorsten Brötzmann; Alex Geringas; Ivo Mohring | 3:32 |
| 2. | "Lebe lauter" | Tom Albrecht; Dior Da Silva; Marc Kaschke | 3:24 |
| 3. | "Die Welt" | Roland Spremberg; Stephan Gade; Ina Klinik | 3:56 |
| 4. | "Ohne Dich" | Paul Leisin; Tim Winter | 3:21 |
| 5. | "Revolution" | Albrecht; Da Silva; Kaschke | 3:24 |
| 6. | "Augenblick am Tag" | Oliver Varga | 2:53 |
| 7. | "Seite eins" | Albrecht; Da Silva; Kaschke | 3:54 |
| 8. | "Scherbenmeer" | Albrecht; Da Silva; Kaschke | 3:49 |
| 9. | "Unsere besten Tage" | Robin Grubert; Martin Fliegenschmidt; Steffie Werner | 3:09 |
| 10. | "An Sommertagen" | Stürmer; Varga; Hartmut Kamm; Gwenael Damman; Klaus Pérez-Salado | 3:16 |
| 11. | "Sonne hinter dem Nebel" | Varga; Kamm; Damman | 2:57 |
| 12. | "Um bei dir zu sein" | Leisin; Winter; Peter Horsch | 3:29 |
| 13. | "Reine Nebensache" | Tobias Röger | 3:53 |
| 14. | "Mitten unterm Jahr" | Florian Sitzmann; Umbo | 4:33 |

== Charts ==
=== Weekly charts ===
| Chart (2006) | Peak position |
|---|---|
| Austrian Albums (Ö3 Austria) | 1 |
| German Albums (Offizielle Top 100) | 1 |
| Swiss Albums (Schweizer Hitparade) | 6 |

=== Year-end charts ===
| Chart (2006) | Position |
|---|---|
| Austrian Albums (Ö3 Austria) | 5 |
| German Albums (Offizielle Top 100) | 43 |
| Swiss Albums (Schweizer Hitparade) | 69 |
| Chart (2007) | Position |
| Austrian Albums (Ö3 Austria) | 12 |
| German Albums (Offizielle Top 100) | 43 |

== Certifications ==
| Region | Certification | Certified units/sales |
|---|---|---|
| Austria (IFPI Austria) | 2× Platinum | 60,000^{*} |
| Switzerland (IFPI Switzerland) | Gold | 15,000^{^} |
^{*} Sales figures based on certification alone.^{^} Shipments figures based on certification alone.
