= Seite an Seite =

Studio album by Christina Stürmer
- Released: 22 April 2016
- Genre: Pop; pop rock
- Label: Polydor
- Producer: Eki von Nice

Christina Stürmer chronology
Gestern. Heute. (2015)	Seite an Seite (2016)	Überall zu Hause (2018)

Seite an Seite (English: Side by Side) is the seventh studio album by Austrian recording artist Christina Stürmer. It was released by Polydor Records on 22 April 2016 in German-speaking Europe.

== Track listing ==
Seite an Seite – Standard edition
No.	Title	Writer(s)	Length
1.	"Katapult"	Stürmer; Oliver Varga; Joe Walter	3:23
2.	"Seite an Seite"	Christoph Koterzina; Markus Schlichtherle; Daniel Flamm	3:41
3.	"Träum weiter"	Röger	3:30
4.	"Du fehlst hier"	Stürmer; Varga; Walter; Klaus Pérez-Salado	3:42
5.	"Astronaut"	Stürmer; Walter; Oliver Som	3:47
6.	"Ein Teil von mir"	Stürmer; Varga; Walter	3:40
7.	"Tanzen"	Stürmer; Christian Neander; Tom Albrecht; Varga	3:19
8.	"Tragflächen"	Albrecht; Niko Floss	3:39
9.	"Immer weiter"	Stürmer; Varga; Tobias Kuhn; Sebastian Wehlings	3:50
10.	"Niemals mehr für immer"	Stürmer; Röger	4:06
11.	"Leicht sein"	Stürmer; Röger; Varga	3:40
12.	"Neue Farben"	Christoph Koterzina; Markus Schlichtherle; Daniel Flamm	3:13
13.	"Zeppelinherz"	Albrecht; Patrick Kronenberger	3:25

Seite an Seite – Deluxe edition (Disc 2)
No.	Title	Writer(s)	Length
1.	"Pendel"	Thomas Dörschel; Johannes Walter-Müller; Alexander Freund	3:26
2.	"Volle Kraft voraus"	Xavier Naidoo; Michael Herberger	3:33
3.	"Alles nur geklaut"	Tobias Künzel	3:39
4.	"Mon amour"	Daniel Wirtz; Matthias Matthew Hoffmann	3:16
5.	"Herzbeben"		3:44
6.	"Wieder am Leben"		3:00

== Charts ==
=== Weekly charts ===
Chart (2016)	Peak position
Austrian Albums (Ö3 Austria)	1
German Albums (Offizielle Top 100)	2
Swiss Albums (Schweizer Hitparade)	12

=== Year-end charts ===
Chart (2016)	Position
Austrian Albums (Ö3 Austria)	36
German Albums (Offizielle Top 100)	72

== Certifications ==
Region	Certification	Certified units/sales
Austria (IFPI Austria)	Gold	7,500^{*}
^{*} Sales figures based on certification alone.
