= Mama (Ana Ahabak) =

Single by Christina Stürmer

from the album Freier Fall
- Released: 17 November 2003
- Genre: Pop rock
- Length: 3:55
- Songwriter(s): Alexander Kahr; Robert Pfluger
- Producer(s): Alexander Kahr

Christina Stürmer singles chronology
"Geh nicht wenn du kommst" (2003)	"Mama (Ana Ahabak)" (2003)	"Vorbei" (2004)

Music video
- "Mama (Ana Ahabak)" on YouTube

"Mama (Ana Ahabak)" [English: "Mother (I Love You)"] is a song by Austrian recording artist Christina Stürmer. Dealing with the 2003 invasion of Iraq, it was written by Robert Pfluger and Alexander Kahr for her debut studio album Freier Fall (2003), while production was helmed by the latter. Selected as the album's third and final single, the song became Stürmer's second number one hit in Austria, where it was certified platinum by the International Federation of the Phonographic Industry (IFPI).

In 2005, a re-arranged version of "Mama (Ana Ahabak)" featuring additional production by Thorsten Brötzmann, was included on Stürmer's international album Schwarz Weiss, marking her first venture into the German and Swiss music markets. Selected as the album's third single, it reached number 11 in Germany and number 33 on the Swiss Singles Chart.

== Music video ==
The music video starts with Stürmer sitting on the floor. Scenes of little kids sitting outside in the cold around a fire are shown. Kids sitting alone in their beds are shown. The video then moves to show kids picking up scrap pieces of wood. Little kids are shown scavenging through garbage.

== Interpretation ==
The title "Mama (Ana Ahabak)" is a borrowing from the Arabic Ana Ahabak (in Arabic أنا أحبك transliterated anā uḥibbuk) which is Arabic for "I Love You." The song was written after the American and Allied attacks on Iraq and Afghanistan. The song is about the confusion of the war and the disastrous effect on children.

== Charts ==
=== Weekly charts ===
Chart (2003)	Peak position
Austria (Ö3 Austria Top 40)	1
Chart (2005)	Peak position
Germany (GfK)	11
Switzerland (Schweizer Hitparade)	33

=== Year-end charts ===
Chart (2003)	Position
Austria (Ö3 Austria Top 40)	27
Chart (2004)	Position
Austria (Ö3 Austria Top 40)	2
Chart (2006)	Position
Germany (Official German Charts)	82

== Certifications ==
Region	Certification	Certified units/sales
Austria (IFPI Austria)	Platinum	30,000^{*}
^{*} Sales figures based on certification alone.
