= Um bei dir zu sein =

Single by Christina Stürmer

from the album Lebe Lauter
- Released: (Germany) (Switzerland) 3 August 2007
- Recorded: 2006
- Genre: Rock
- Length: 3:18
- Label: Polydor Records
- Songwriter(s): Paul Leisin, Peter Horsch, Tim Winter
- Producer(s): Thorsten Brötzmann

Christina Stürmer singles chronology
"Augenblick am Tag" (2007)	"Um bei dir zu sein" (2007)	"Mitten Unterm Jahr" (2007)

"Um bei dir zu sein" is the sixth single from Christina Stürmer's fourth album, Lebe Lauter. The song was first released in Austria with "An Sommertagen," where it reached number one. It was released by itself in Germany and Europe, reaching #39 in Germany and #128 throughout all of Europe. Translated, the song title means, "To Be at Your Side".

== Music video ==
The music video starts off with Stürmer lying on the floor in the studio listening to music. She is shown singing live on a screen in the subway. Shots of her singing live in the studio are shown. People begin to gather in the subway to watch her sing. Shots of her singing begin to be shown around town.

== Charts ==
=== Weekly charts ===
Chart (2006–07)	Peak position
Austria (Ö3 Austria Top 40)	1
Germany (GfK)	39

=== Year-end charts ===
Chart (2006)	Position
Austria (Ö3 Austria Top 40)	17
