= In dieser Stadt =

Studio album by Christina Stürmer
- Released: 10 April 2009
- Genre: Pop; pop rock
- Length: 59:09
- Label: Universal
- Producer: Thorsten Brötzmann

Christina Stürmer chronology
laut-Los (2008)	In dieser Stadt (2009)	Nahaufnahme (2010)

Singles from In dieser Stadt
- 1. "Ist mir egal" Released: 27 March 2009; 2. "Mehr als perfekt" Released: 3 July 2009

In dieser Stadt (English: In This Town) is the fourth studio album by Austrian recording artist Christina Stürmer. It was released on 10 April 2009, almost exactly a year after the release of her acoustic album, laut-Los (2008). The lead single, "Ist mir egal".

== Track listing ==
In dieser Stadt – Standard edition
No.	Title	Writer(s)	Length
1.	"Das können wir sein"	Brötzmann; Jan Löchel; Ivo Moring; Stephan Gudze-Hinze	2:53
2.	"In dieser Stadt"	Oliver Varga	3:32
3.	"Bleib hier"	Varga; Jan-Philipp Kelber	3:47
4.	"Nicht mehr weit"	Löchel; Varga; Moring	3:19
5.	"Ist mir egal"	Brötzmann; Löchel; Moring	2:55
6.	"Mehr als perfekt"	Martin Fliegenschmidt; Kelber	3:36
7.	"Im Kreis"	Tom Albrecht	3:11
8.	"Dieser Tag"	Anna Müller; Paul R. Wallner	3:46
9.	"Tanz ohne Musik"	Varga; Jonathan Walter	3:35
10.	"Jetzt dank ich dir"	Brötzmann; Löchel; Moring	3:17
11.	"Vielleicht"	Joachim Schlüter; Tobias Röger; Kelber	3:28
12.	"Niemals hoffnungslos"	Löchel; Varga; Moring	2:52
13.	"Du für mich"	Paul Leisin; Tim Winter	3:31
14.	"Stille Helden"	Robin Grubert; Löchel; Fliegenschmidt	3:49
15.	"Ein Leben lang"	Röger	3:16
16.	"Reiß das Radio auf"/"Entlaufene Hunde" (hidden track)	Schlüter; Varga; Röger	3:21

In dieser Stadt – Premium edition
No.	Title	Writer(s)	Length
1.	"Das können wir sein"	Brötzmann; Jan Löchel; Ivo Moring; Stephan Gudze-Hinze	2:53
2.	"In dieser Stadt"	Oliver Varga	3:32
3.	"Bleib hier"	Varga; Jan-Philipp Kelber	3:47
4.	"Nicht mehr weit"	Löchel; Varga; Moring	3:19
5.	"Ist mir egal"	Brötzmann; Löchel; Moring	2:55
6.	"Mehr als perfekt"	Martin Fliegenschmidt; Kelber	3:36
7.	"Im Kreis"	Tom Albrecht	3:11
8.	"Dieser Tag"	Anna Müller; Paul R. Wallner	3:46
9.	"Tanz ohne Musik"	Varga; Jonathan Walter	3:35
10.	"Jetzt dank ich dir"	Brötzmann; Löchel; Moring	3:17
11.	"Jedes Wort"		3:37
12.	"Vielleicht"	Joachim Schlüter; Tobias Röger; Kelber	3:28
13.	"Niemals hoffnungslos"	Löchel; Varga; Moring	2:52
14.	"Ich vermisse nichts"		3:17
15.	"Du für mich"	Paul Leisin; Tim Winter	3:31
16.	"Stille Helden"	Robin Grubert; Löchel; Fliegenschmidt	3:49
17.	"Ein Leben lang"	Röger	3:16
18.	"Reiß das Radio auf"	Schlüter; Varga; Röger	3:21
19.	"Nimm mich mit"		3:42

In dieser Stadt – Premium edition – iTunes bonus track
No.	Title	Length
20.	"An Tagen wie diesem"	3:30

== Charts ==
=== Weekly charts ===
Chart (2009)	Peak position
Austrian Albums (Ö3 Austria)	1
German Albums (Offizielle Top 100)	6
Swiss Albums (Schweizer Hitparade)	8

=== Year-end charts ===
Chart (2009)	Position
Austrian Albums (Ö3 Austria)	33
