= Millionen Lichter =

Single by Christina Stürmer

from the album Ich hör auf mein Herz
- Released: 29 March 2013
- Genre: Pop; pop rock
- Length: 3:49
- Label: Polydor; Universal
- Songwriter(s): Tobias Röger
- Producer(s): Christian Neander; David Jürgens

Christina Stürmer singles chronology
"Wenn die Welt untergeht" (2010)	"Millionen Lichter" (2013)	"Ich hör auf mein Herz" (2013)

"Millionen Lichter" (German: Millions of Lights) is a song by Austrian recording artist Christina Stürmer. It was written by Tobias Röger and produced by Christian Neander and David Jürgens for her sixth studio album Ich hör auf mein Herz (2013).

== Formats and track listings ==
CD single
No.	Title	Length
1.	"Millionen Lichter"	3:37
2.	"Auf und davon"	3:05

== Charts ==
=== Weekly charts ===
Chart (2013)	Peak position
Austria (Ö3 Austria Top 40)	5
Germany (GfK)	23
Switzerland (Schweizer Hitparade)	61

== Certifications ==
Region	Certification	Certified units/sales
Germany (BVMI)	Gold	150,000^{^}
^{^} Shipments figures based on certification alone.
