= Ich lebe =

Single by Christina Stürmer

from the album Freier Fall
- Released: 24 March 2003
- Genre: Pop rock
- Length: 3:25
- Label: Universal
- Songwriters: Alexander Kahr; Eva Kraus; Harald Hanisch; Leopold Zillinger
- Producer: Alexander Kahr

Christina Stürmer singles chronology
"Ich lebe" (2003)	"Geh Nicht Wenn du Kommst" (2003)

"Ich lebe" (English: "I Live") is a song by Austrian recording artist Christina Stürmer. It was written by Alexander Kahr, Eva Kraus, Harald Hanisch, and Leopold Zillinger for her debut studio album Freier Fall (2003), while production was helmed by the former. Recorded after her participation in the ORF 1 talent show Starmania, where Stürmer had finished runner-up, it was released by Polydor Records on 24 March 2003 in Austria, where it debuted at number-one on the Austrian Singles Chart and remained atop for another seven weeks.

In 2005, a slightly re-written version of "Ich lebe", featuring additional lyrics by Frank Ramond and Maya Singh as well as new production by Thorsten Brötzmann, preceded the release of Stürmer's album Schwarz Weiss, her first venture into the German and Swiss music markets. This version peaked at number four on the German Singles Chart, and reached number 21 in Switzerland. It was eventually certified gold by the Bundesverband Musikindustrie (BVMI).

== Music video ==
In the music video for "Ich lebe", Stürmer and her band are performing in a white room and as she sings about various things, shots of those things are shown.

== Tracks ==
=== Original version ===
1. "Ich lebe" (Radio Version)
2. "Ich lebe" (Unplugged)
3. "Ich lebe" (Karaoke Version)

=== Re-release ===
1. "Ich lebe" (Radio Version)
2. "Ich lebe" (Live Version)
3. "Ich lebe" (Instrumental Version)
4. "Vorbei" (Live Version)

== Charts ==
=== Weekly charts ===
Chart (2003)	Peak position
Austria (Ö3 Austria Top 40)	1
Chart (2005)	Peak position
Austria (Ö3 Austria Top 40)	26
Germany (GfK)	4
Switzerland (Schweizer Hitparade)	21

=== Year-end charts ===
Chart (2003)	Position
Austria (Ö3 Austria Top 40)	2
Chart (2005)	Position
Germany (Official German Charts)	33
Switzerland (Schweizer Hitparade)	84

== Certifications ==
Region	Certification	Certified units/sales
Austria (IFPI Austria)	Platinum	30,000^{*}
Germany (BVMI)	Gold	150,000^{^}
^{*} Sales figures based on certification alone.^{^} Shipments figures based on certification alone.
