= Vorbei =

Single by Christina Stürmer

from the album Soll das wirklich alles sein?
- Released: Austria: 3 May 2004
- Genre: Pop rock
- Length: 3:12
- Label: Polydor
- Songwriter: Hanno Bruhn
- Producer: Alexander Kahr

Christina Stürmer singles chronology
| "Mama (Ana Ahabak)" (2003) | "Vorbei" (2004) | "Bus durch London" (2004) |

"Vorbei" (German pronunciation: [foːɐ̯ˈbaɪ]; "Over") is a song by Austrian recording artist Christina Stürmer. It was written by Hanno Bruhn and produced by Alexander Kahr for her second studio album, Soll das wirklich alles sein?. Selected as the album's leading single, it became Stürmer's third non-consecutive number one hit in Austria, where it was certified gold by the International Federation of the Phonographic Industry (IFPI). In Germany and Switzerland, "Vorbei" served as her debut single and reached number eighty-three on the German Singles Chart.

== Music video ==
The video for "Vorbei" depicts Christina trashing her boyfriend's apartment as he sleeps unaware on the bed. Throughout the video, she destroys various items and draws on her boyfriend's face.

== Formats and track listings ==
CD maxi single
| No. | Title | Length |
|---|---|---|
| 1. | "Vorbei" (Radio Edit) | 3:12 |
| 2. | "Disco" | 4:13 |
| 3. | "Vorbei" (Karaoke Version) | 3:12 |
| 4. | "Disco" (Karaoke Version) | 4:13 |

== Charts ==
=== Weekly charts ===
| Chart (2004) | Peak position |
|---|---|
| Austria (Ö3 Austria Top 40) | 1 |
| Germany (GfK) | 83 |

=== Year-end charts ===
| Chart (2004) | Position |
|---|---|
| Austria (Ö3 Austria Top 40) | 22 |

== Certifications ==
| Region | Certification | Certified units/sales |
|---|---|---|
| Austria (IFPI Austria) | Gold | 15,000^{*} |
^{*} Sales figures based on certification alone.
