= Christina Stürmer =

Austrian singer and songwriter (born 1982)

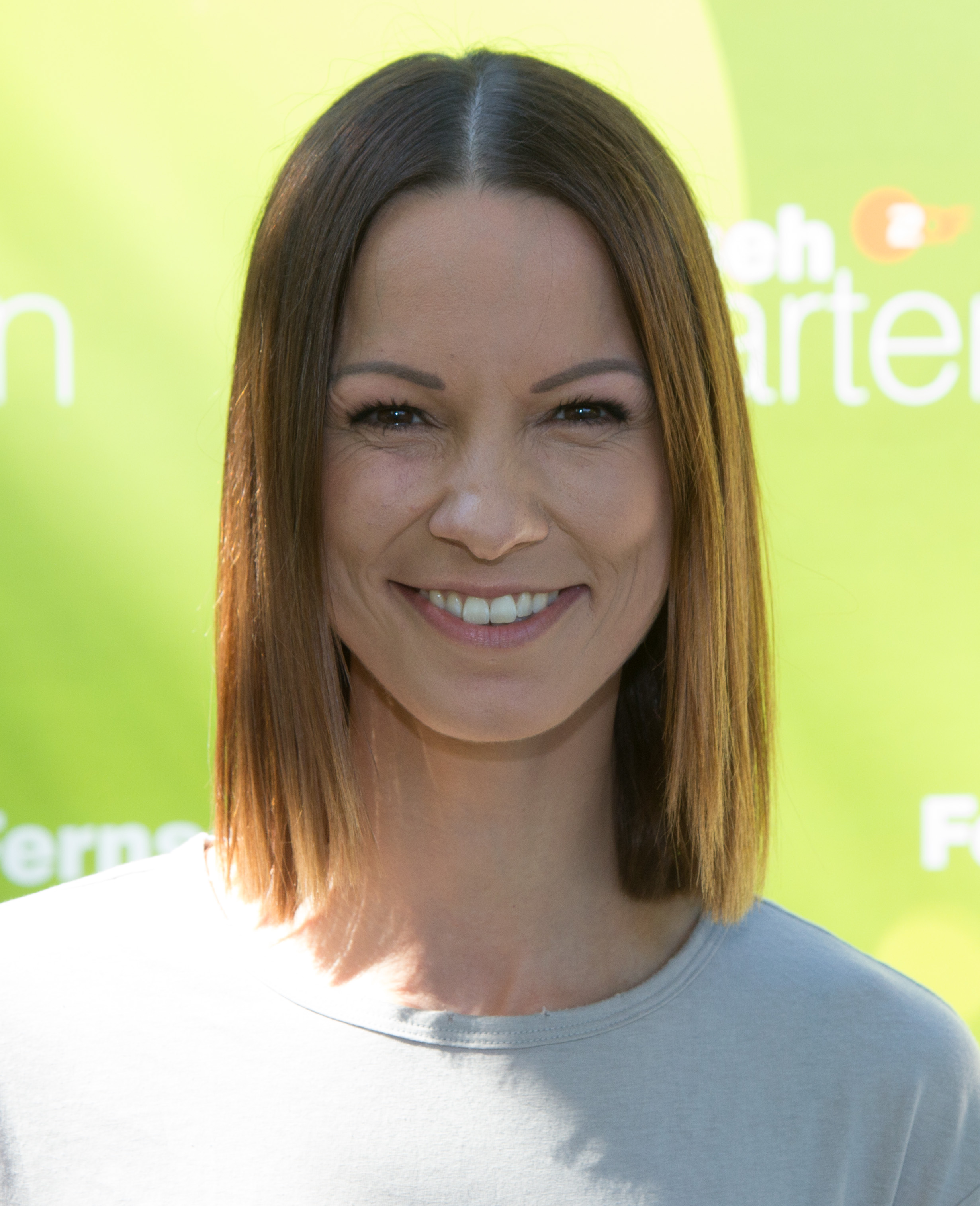
- Stürmer in 2018

Background information
- Born: Christina Stürmer; 9 June 1982 (age 44); Linz, Oberosterreich, Austria
- Genres: Pop; pop rock; rock
- Occupation: Lead singer
- Instrument: singing
- Years active: 2003–present
- Label: Polydor
- Website: www.christinaonline.at

Christina Stürmer (born 9 June 1982) is an Austrian singer and songwriter. Born and raised in Linz, she rose to fame as the runner-up of the inaugural season of the ORF eins television talent series Starmania. Following her participation, she signed with Universal Music and released her debut single "Ich lebe" which spent nine weeks atop the Austrian Singles Chart. It was followed by the release of her first two albums, Freier Fall (2003) and Soll das wirklich alles sein (2004), both of which debuted atop the Austrian Albums Chart and produced eight top ten hits, including the number-one singles "Mama (Ana Ahabak)" and "Vorbei".

With the release of her international debut album Schwarz Weiss, Stürmer became one of the biggest-selling Austrian artists to emerge in German-speaking Europe in the mid-2000s. She followed her international breakthrough with a series of successful albums, including the chart toppers Lebe lauter (2006), In dieser Stadt (2009), Ich hör auf mein Herz (2013) and Seite an Seite (2016). Several singles from these album became hits on the pop charts in Austria, Germany, and Switzerland, including the number-one hits "Nie genug" and "Um bei dir zu sein" as well as top ten singles such as "Mitten unterm Jahr" and "Millionen Lichter".

Throughout a career spanning 15 years, Stürmer has sold over 2.0 million records. Aside from her commercial accomplishments, her work has earned her numerous awards and accolades, including eleven Amadeus Austrian Music Awards, a Goldene Stimmgabel, and two ECHO Awards. In 2015, Stürmer took part in the second season of the German The Best Singers adaptation Sing meinen Song – Das Tauschkonzert. In 2017, she served as a coach on the German television series It Takes 2.

== Early life and music career ==
=== Starmania ===
In 2003, Stürmer finished in second place in the talent show Starmania behind Michael Tschuggnall. Shortly after that she released her first original song, "Ich Lebe" (I Live) which in 2003 occupied the number one spot on the Austrian music charts for nine weeks.

=== Beginning her career in Austria ===
After "Ich Lebe" followed two more successful singles: "Geh nicht wenn du kommst" (Don't Go When You Come) and the anti-war song Mama (Ana Ahabak) (Arabic for Mama, I Love You) which originated during the war in Iraq. The song represents a young Iraqi girl's perspective of the war, and it also spent nine weeks at the number one spot on the Austrian charts. Her first album, Freier Fall (Free Fall), was released exclusively in Austria in May 2003, and it also rose quickly to the top of the charts, where it occupied the number one spot for weeks. In fall of 2003 she undertook an Austrian tour behind the strength of her first album.

In May 2004 her second album, Soll das wirklich alles sein (Is that really everything?) appeared, again only in Austria. The album was even more successful than Freier Fall, (Free Fall) but the album's singles had only average sales figures. The Wirklich alles! (Really Everything!) tour in Austria followed in the fall. The highlight of this tour was the concert at Vienna city hall in November, which sold out all 11,000 tickets. The concert was filmed, and along with some interviews and a short biography, was released in DVD form as Wirklich alles! During the club tour that began directly after the Vienna concert, she presented for the first time her own original compositions, which she had written with her band.

=== Breakthrough in Germany ===
At this time, Stürmer and her managers, Andreas Streit and Bernd Rengleshausen, were working towards breaking through in Germany. The single Vorbei was released in Germany in November 2004, but it fell short of expectations. In April 2005 a re-worked version of "Ich Lebe" was released in Germany. This single met with success; it rose to ninth place on the German charts, and shortly thereafter reached number four.

The album which followed, named Schwarz Weiss (Black White) was released in June 2005, in Germany and Switzerland, reached number three on the German album charts, and stayed in the top twenty for more than a year. The majority of the songs on this album, which were mostly already known in Austria, were reproduced and oriented towards the emerging trends in German rock and pop music. The singles were "Engel fliegen Einsam" (Angels Fly Lonely) "Mama (Ana Ahabak)", and "Immer an euch geglaubt" (Always Believed In You). The singles were also re-recorded to be more rock oriented. In late 2005 Christina and her band toured through Germany and Switzerland. The Schwarz-Weiss tour, with just under 40 concerts, lasted two months.

=== Continued success ===
In 2006, Stürmer and her band released their fourth album, Lebe lauter (Live Louder). The album reached number one in both Germany and Austria. And the singles, Nie genug (Never Enough), and Um bei dir zu sein/An Sommertagen (To Be By Your Side/On Summer Days) both reached number one as well on the Austrian charts. The first single, Nie genug reached number fifteen in Germany. The following singles after Um bei dir zu sein/An Sommertagen, Ohne Dich (Without You) and Scherbenmeer both reached the top ten in Austria. When Austria co-hosted Euro 2008 with Switzerland, Stürmer's song Fieber was the Austrian song for Euro 2008, followed by her last album In dieser Stadt in 2009, which brought us two more singles, "Ist mir egal" and "Mehr als perfekt".

Her single "Wir Leben den Moment" was released 3 September 2010, from her latest album, Nahaufnahme (Close-up), which was released in 2010. This album also featured some other hits, such as Warum (Why) and Juniherz (Heart of June).

In 2013, her next single Millionen Lichter (Millions of Lights) was released on 29 March. It was followed by the release of the album Ich hör auf mein Herz (I Listen to My Heart) on 19 April. The video was shot in California, USA. In 2023 she recorded a MTV Unplugged album in Vienna.

== Personal life ==
In August 2016, Stürmer and her longtime band member and boyfriend Oliver Varga welcomed a daughter. In March 2021 she had a second daughter.

== Awards ==
- Amadeus Austrian Music Award 2004 for "Best Pop/Rock national" and "Newcomer of the Year national"
- Amadeus Austrian Music Award 2005 for "Best Pop/Rock national" and "Best Single national"
- ECHO 2006 for "Best National Female Artist (Rock/Pop)"
- Amadeus Austrian Music Award 2006 for "Best Pop/Rock national" and "Best Single national"
- Goldene Stimmgabel 2006 for "Best German Rock/Pop"

== Discography ==
=== Studio albums ===
- Freier Fall (2003)
- Soll das wirklich alles sein (2004)
- Lebe lauter (2006)
- In dieser Stadt (2009)
- Nahaufnahme (2010)
- Ich hör auf mein Herz (2013)
- Seite an Seite (2016)
- Überall zu Hause (2018)
