= Sing meinen Song – Das Tauschkonzert =

Television series

- Genre: Reality television
- Country of origin: Germany
- Original language: German
- No. of seasons: 5

Original release
- Network: VOX
- Release: 22 April 2014 – present

Sing meinen Song – Das Tauschkonzert (lit. "Sing My Song – The Exchange Concert") is a German reality television series produced by Schwartzkopff TV Productions and broadcast on German television station VOX. Part of The Best Singers series, it is based on the Dutch series De beste zangers van Nederland. The inaugural series launched on 22 April 2014.

== Season 1 ==
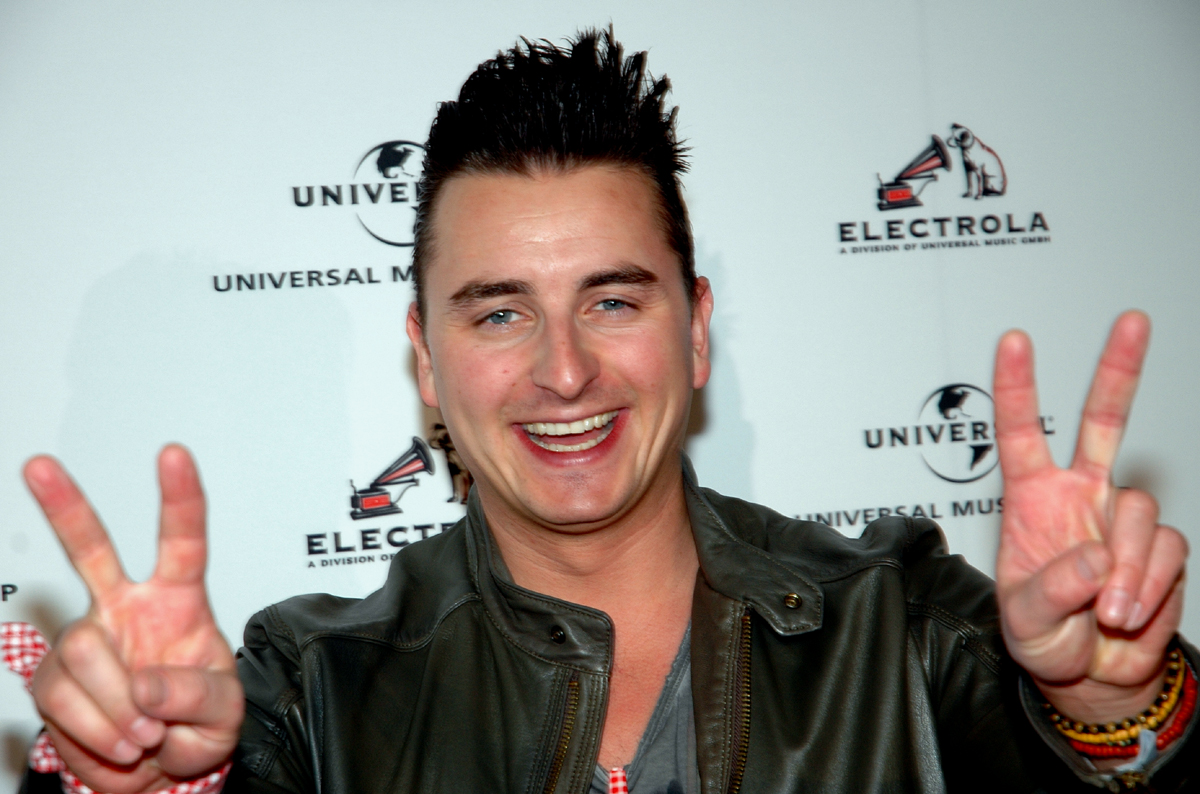
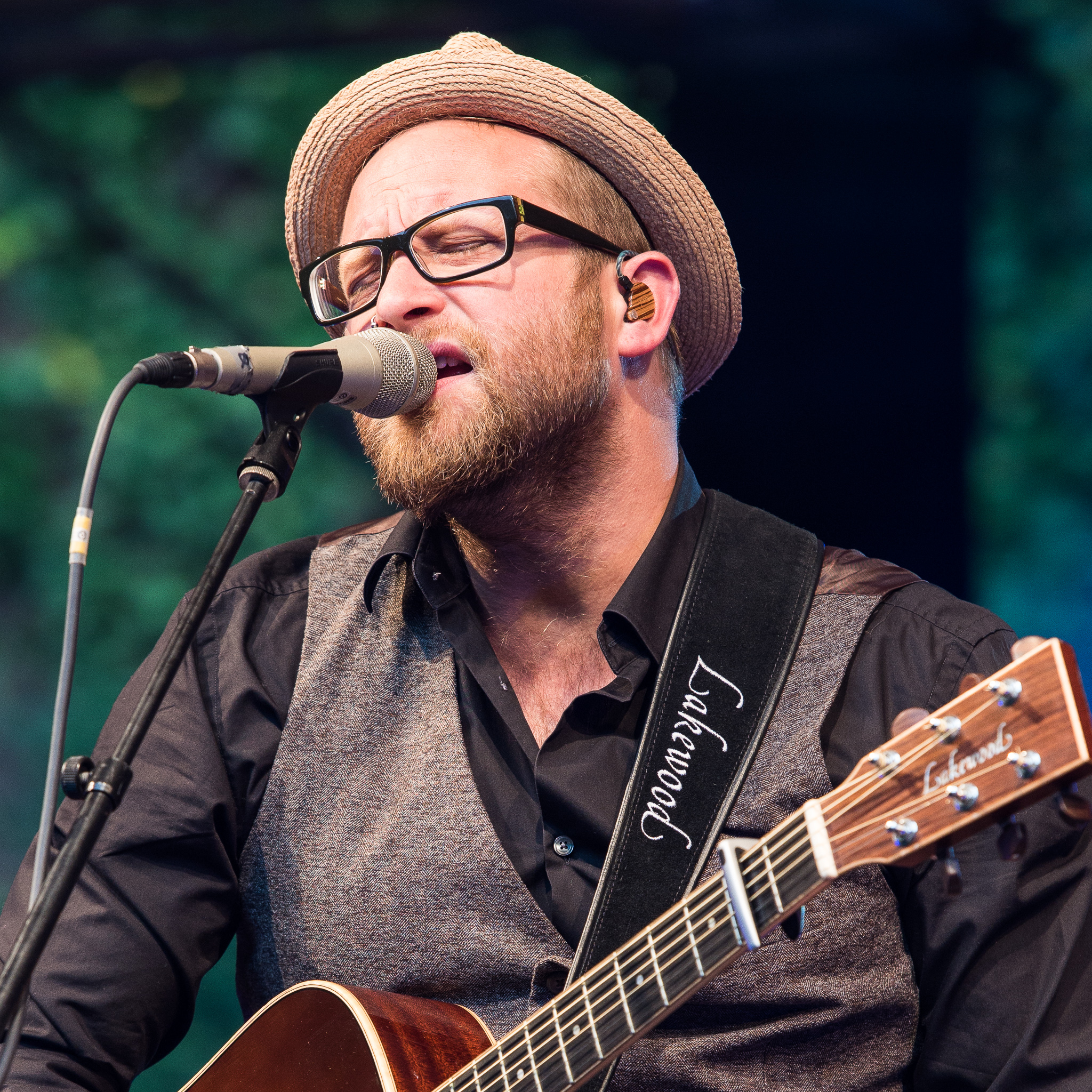
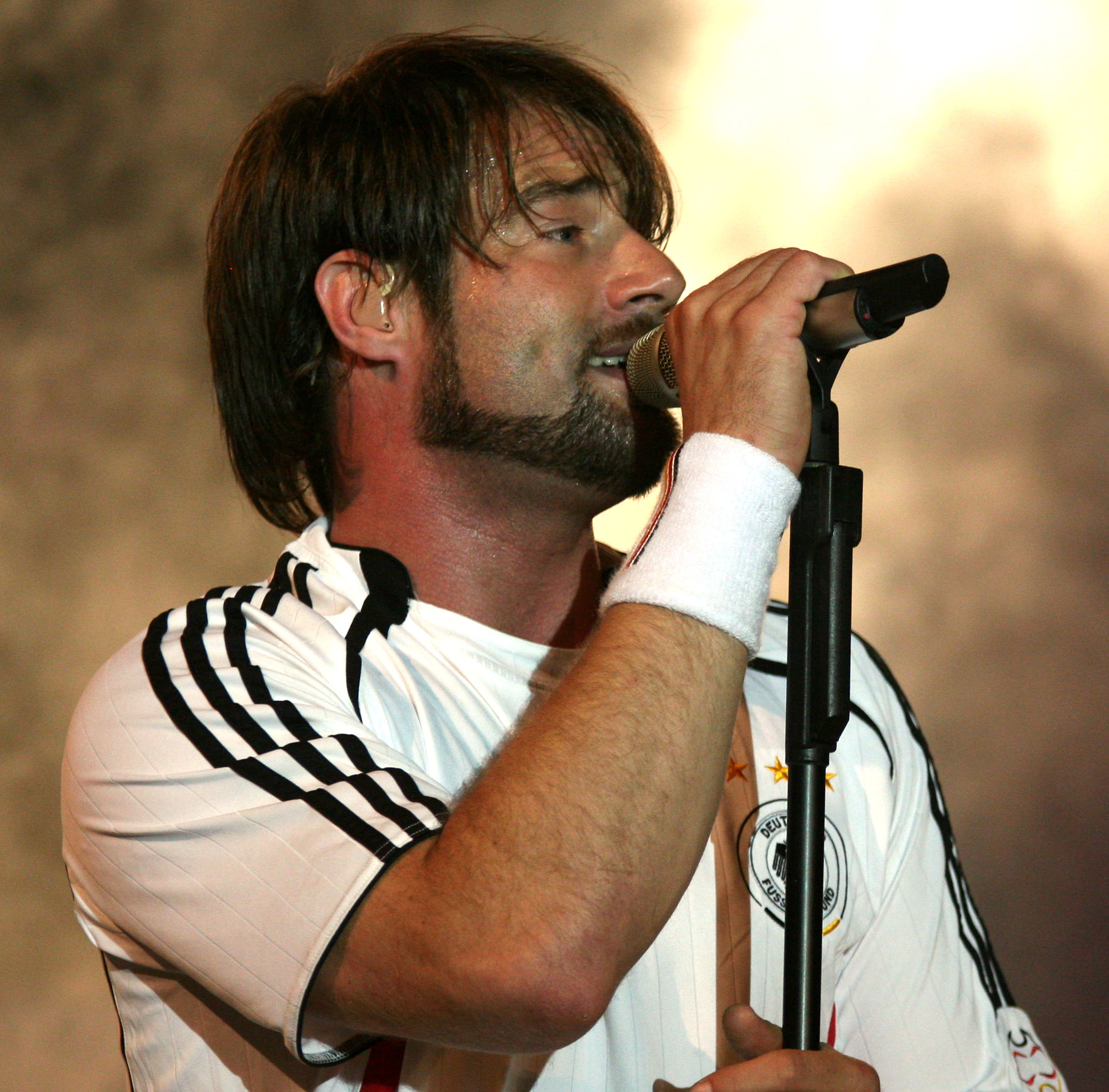
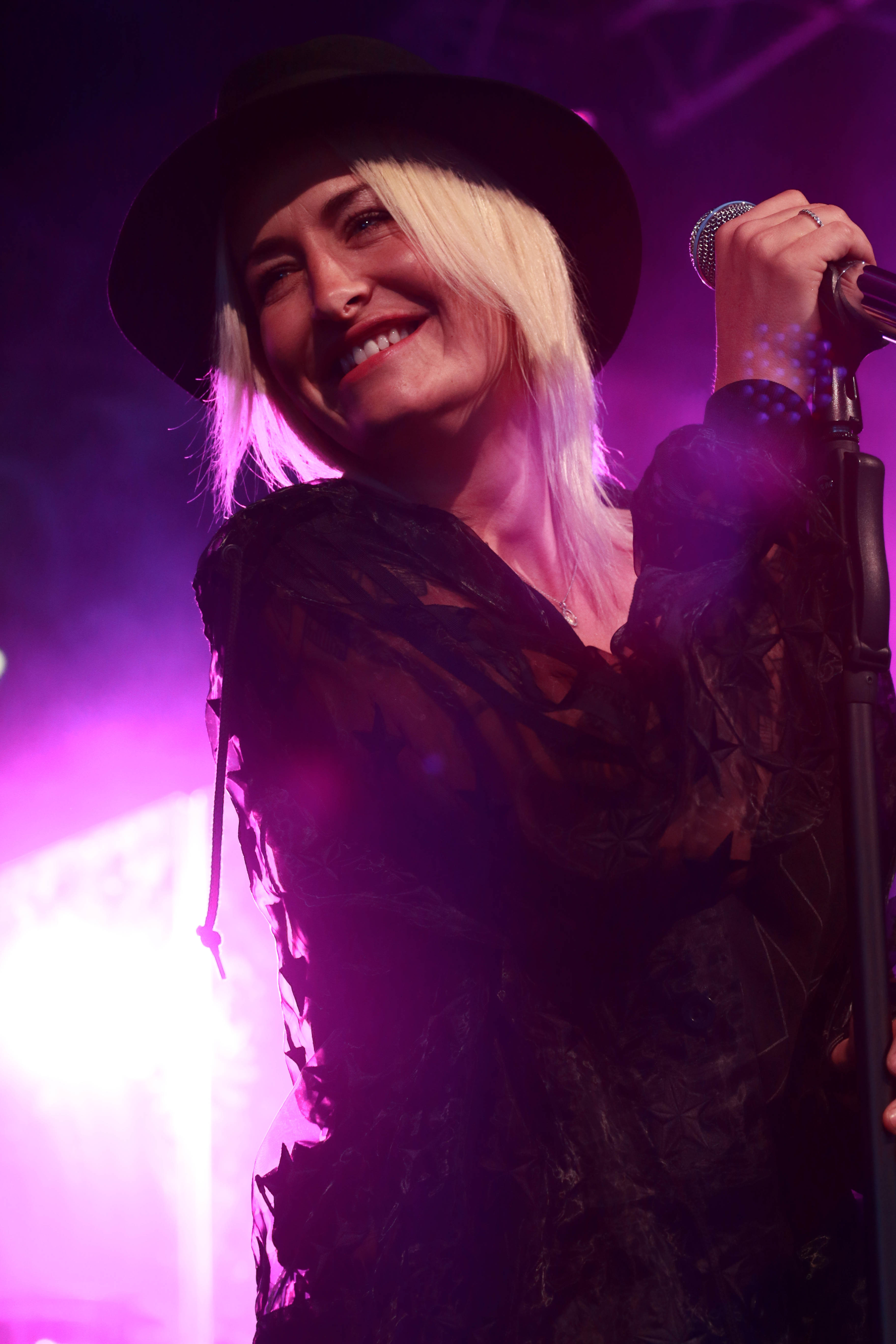
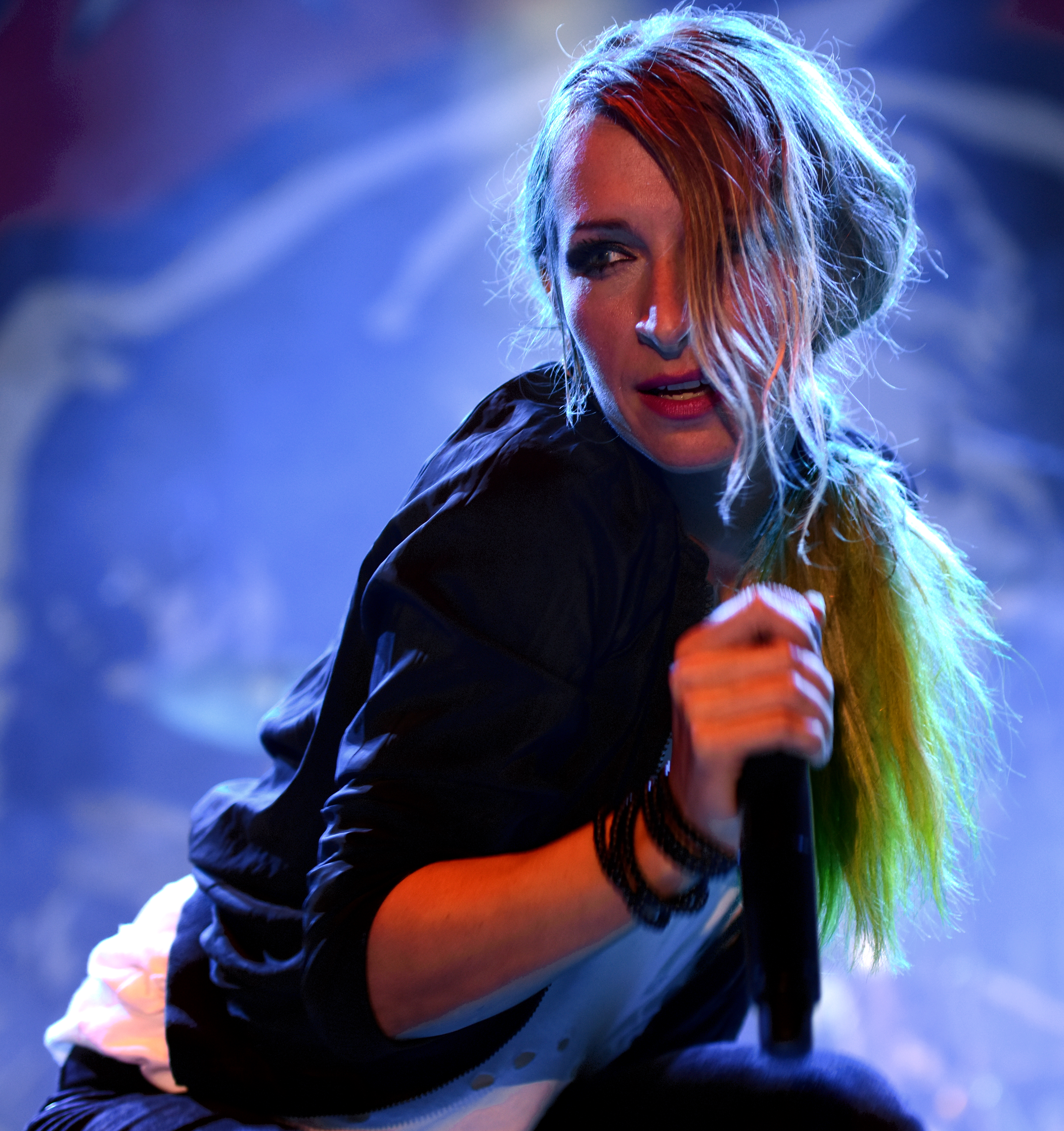
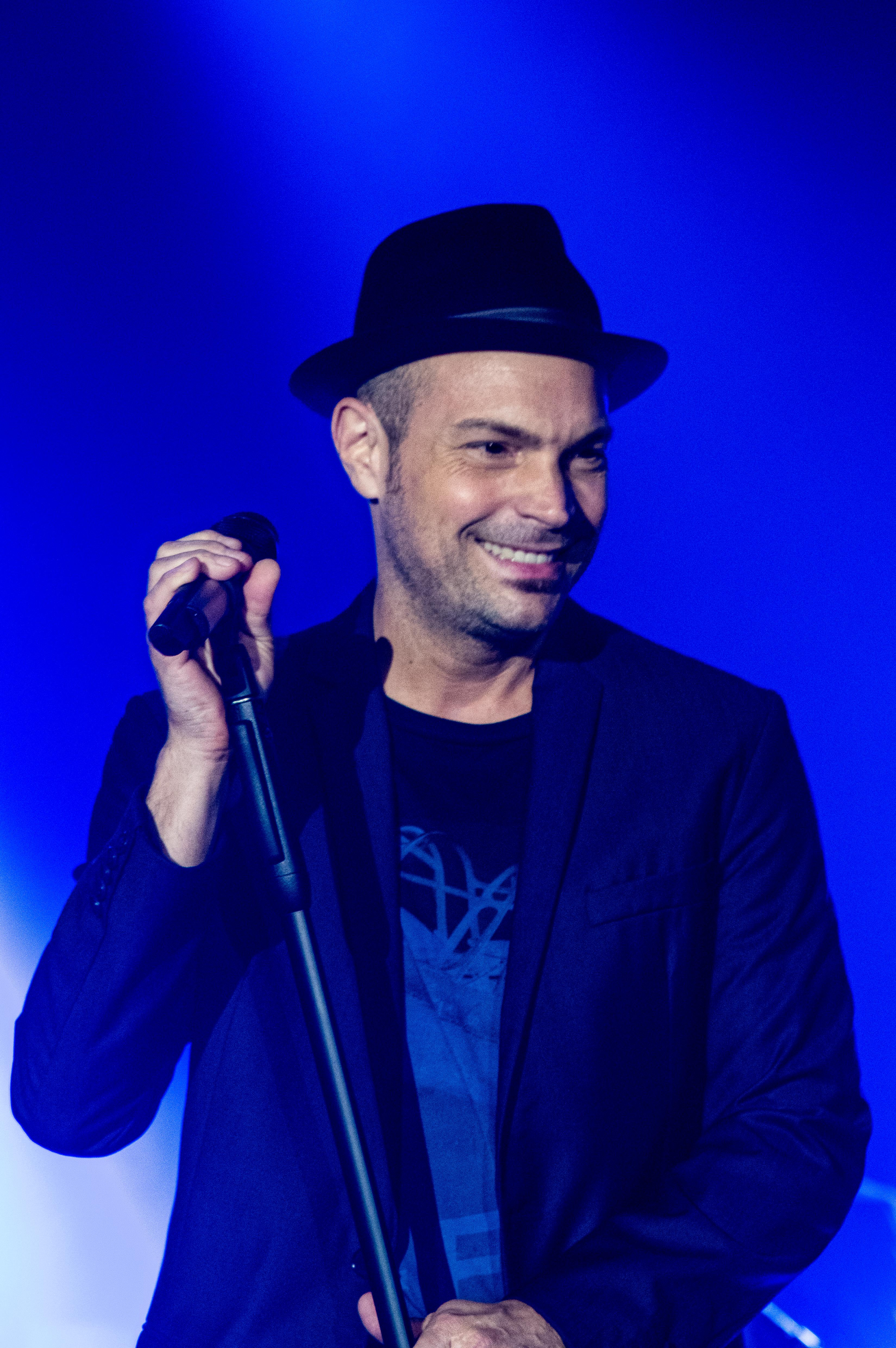
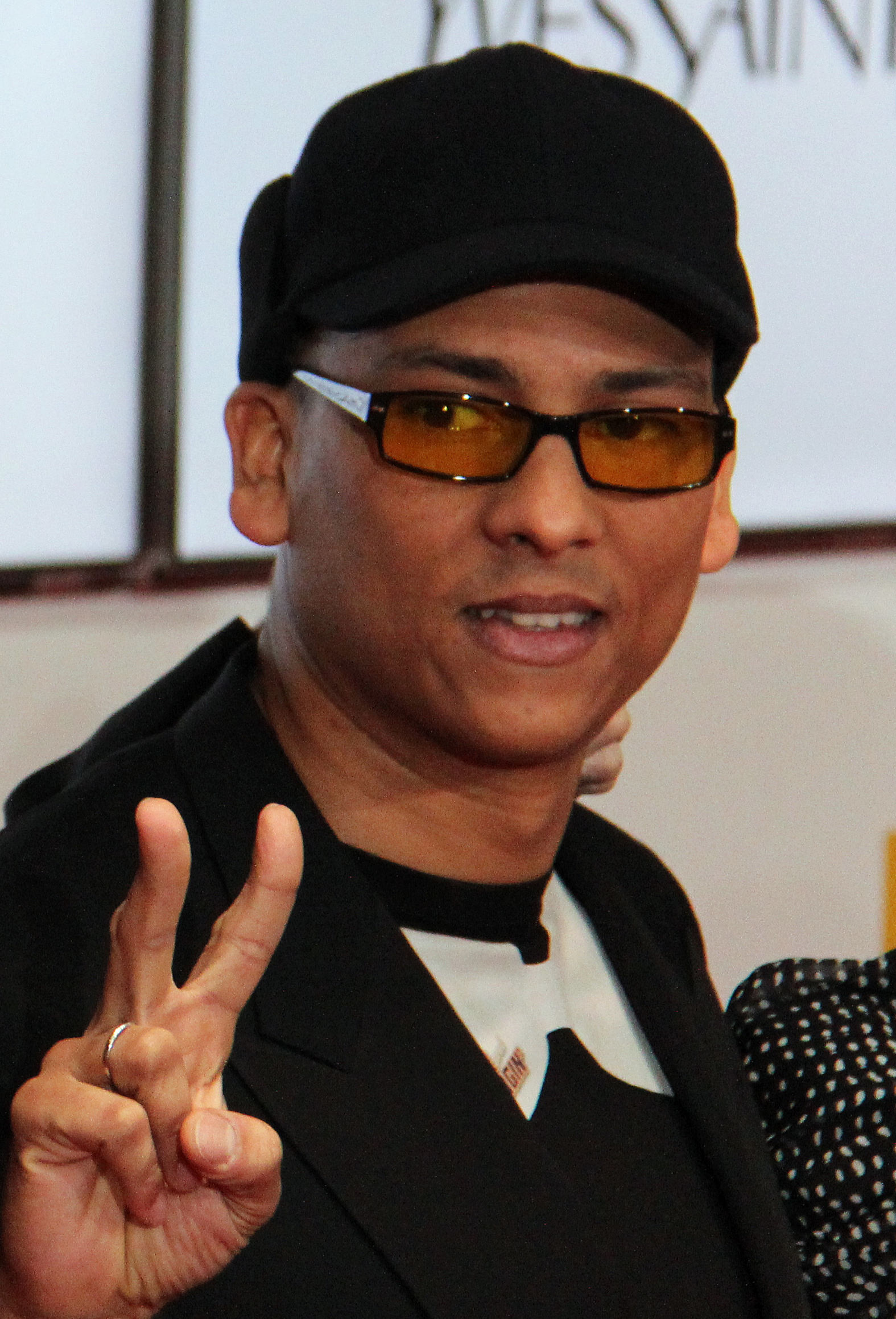
Top to bottom: Andreas Gabalier, Gregor Meyle, Sasha, Sarah Connor, Sandra Nasić, Roger Cicero and Xavier Naidoo.

The first German season of Sing meinen Song included the following artists: Sarah Connor, Andreas Gabalier, Sandra Nasić, Sasha, Roger Cicero, Gregor Meyle and Xavier Naidoo.

=== Show 1 – Sasha ===
Artist	Song
Andreas Gabalier	"Lucky Day"
Sarah Connor	"I Feel Lonely"
Gregor Meyle	"Turn It into Something Special"
Sasha	"Cash & Cameras"
Roger Cicero	"This Is My Time"
Sandra Nasić	"Hide & Seek"
Xavier Naidoo	"If You Believe"

=== Show 2 – Sandra Nasić ===
Artist	Song
Sarah Connor	"You Can't Stop Me"
Xavier Naidoo	"Quietly"
Andreas Gabalier	"Lords of the Boards"
Sandra Nasić	"Drowned in Destiny"
Gregor Meyle	"Sunday Lover"
Roger Cicero	"Oh What a Night"
Sasha	"Open Your Eyes"

=== Show 3 – Andreas Gabalier ===
Artist	Song
Roger Cicero	"I sing a Liad für di"
Sasha	"You're Just Bein' You"
Gregor Meyle	"So liab hob i di"
Andreas Gabalier	"Man of Volks-Rock'n'Roll"
Sandra Nasić	"Home Sweet Home"
Xavier Naidoo	"Amoi seg' ma uns wieder"
Sarah Connor	"Zuckerpuppen"

=== Show 4 – Roger Cicero ===
Artist	Song
Sasha	"Zieh die Schuh aus"
Gregor Meyle	"Frauen regier'n die Welt"
Sandra Nasić	"In diesem Moment"
Roger Cicero	"Wenn es morgen schon zu Ende wär"
Xavier Naidoo	"Wovon träumst du nachts"
Sarah Connor	"Ich atme ein"
Andreas Gabalier	"Die Liste"

=== Show 5 – Sarah Connor ===
Artist	Song
Andreas Gabalier	"Let's Get Back to Bed – Girl!"
Sandra Nasić	"Bounce"
Gregor Meyle	"Skin on Skin"
Sarah Connor	"Unlove You"
Sasha	"From Zero to Hero"
Roger Cicero	"Music Is the Key"
Xavier Naidoo	"From Sarah with Love"

=== Show 6 – Gregor Meyle ===
Artist	Song
Xavier Naidoo	"Du bist das Licht"
Andreas Gabalier	"Heute Nacht"
Sandra Nasić	"Niemand"
Gregor Meyle	"Hier spricht dein Herz"
Roger Cicero	"So soll es sein"
Sarah Connor	"Keine ist wie du"
Sasha	"Hörst du mich"

=== Show 7 – Xavier Naidoo ===
Artist	Song
Sandra Nasić	"20.000 Meilen"
Roger Cicero	"Wo willst du hin?"
Sasha	"Bei meiner Seele"
Xavier Naidoo	"Hört, hört"
Sarah Connor	"Nicht von dieser Welt"
Andreas Gabalier	"Dieser Weg"
Gregor Meyle	"Ich kenne nichts"

== Season 2 ==
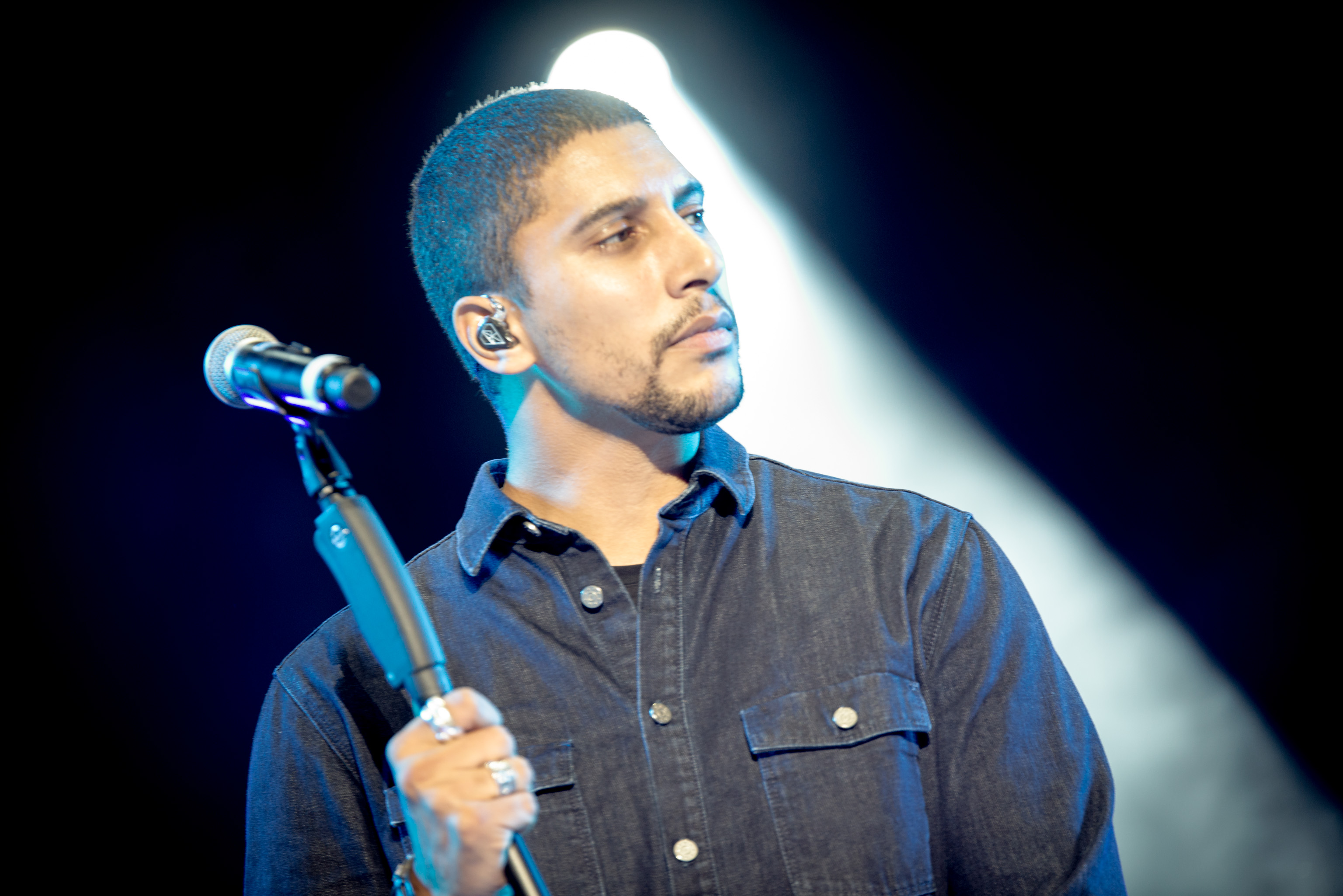
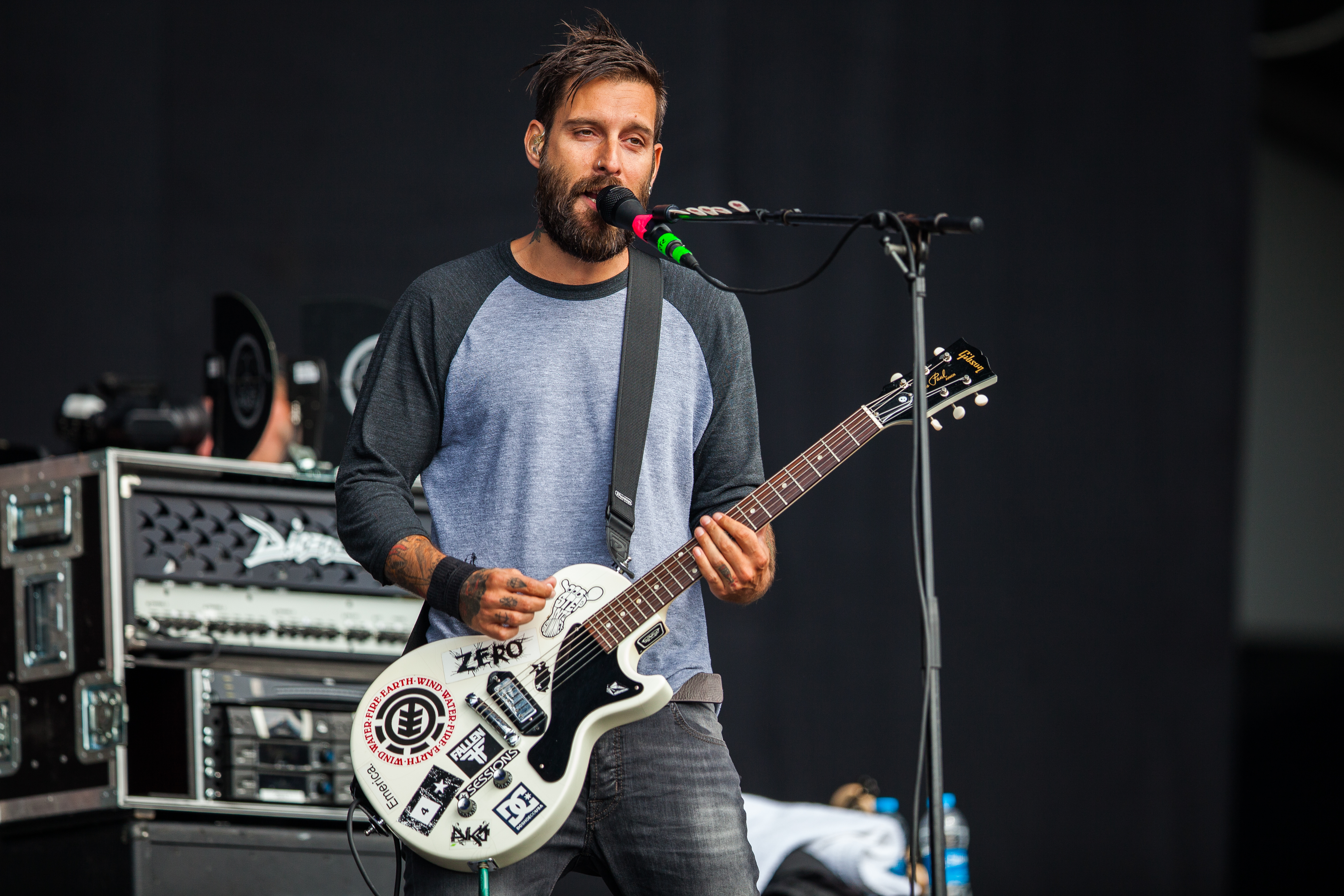
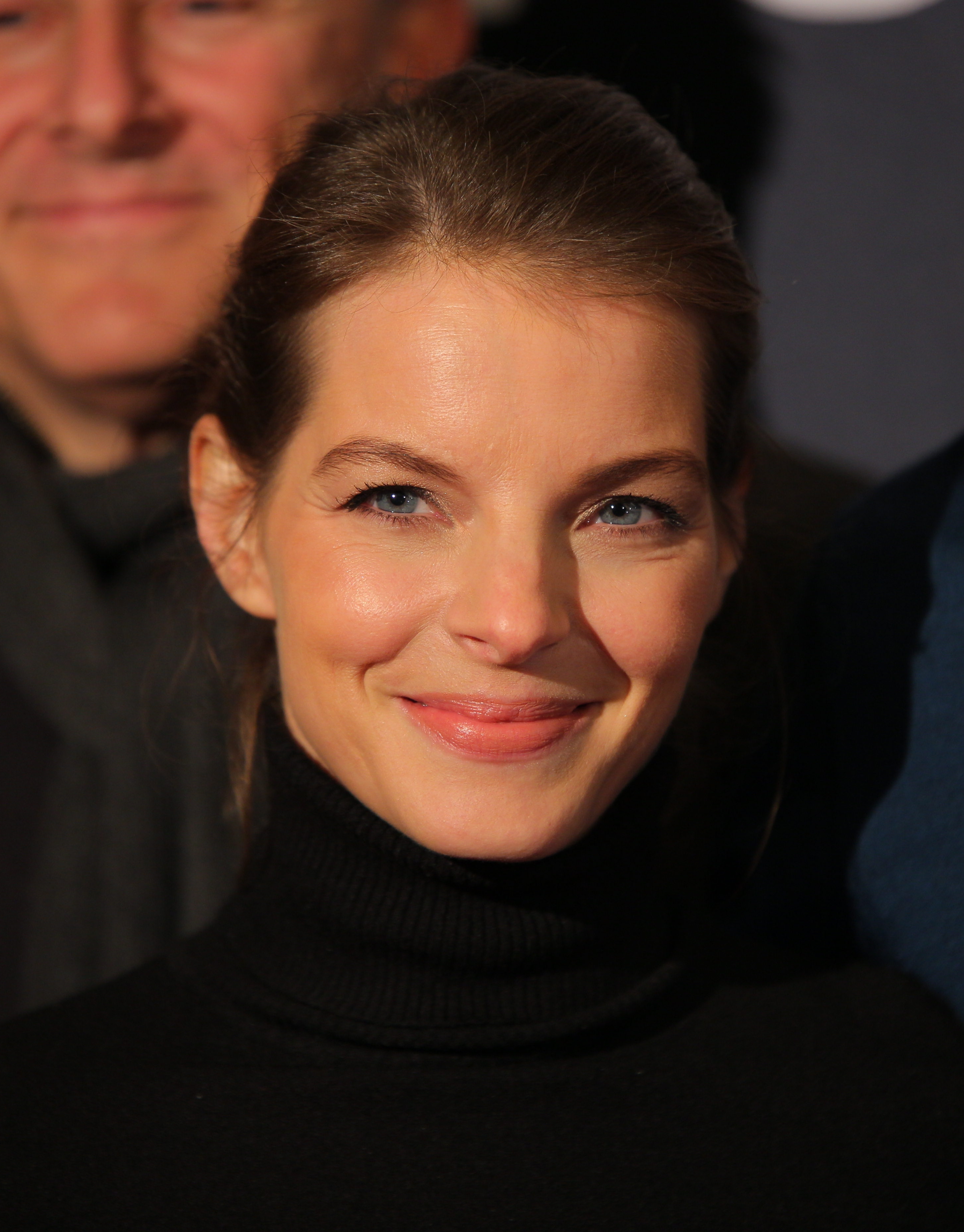
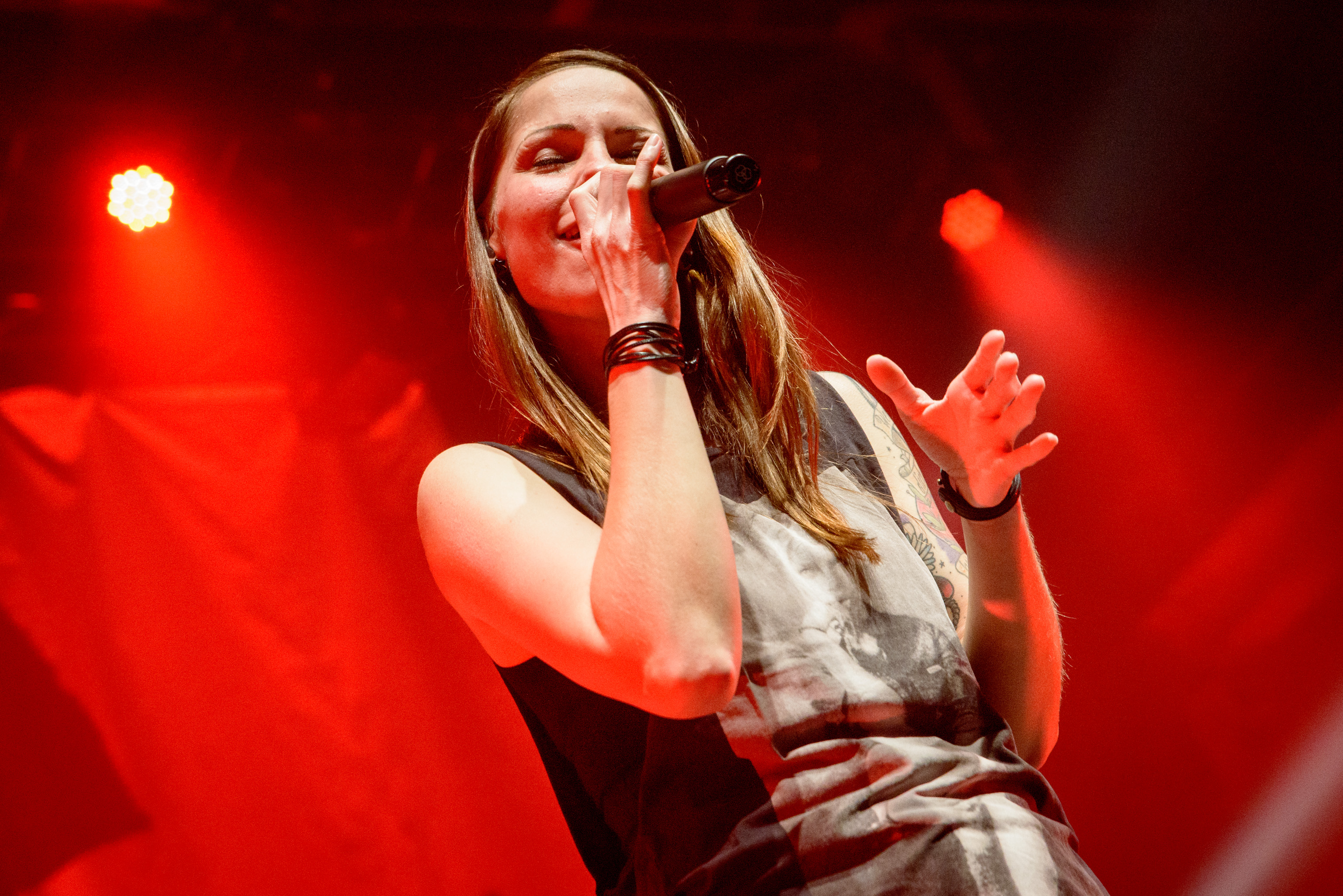
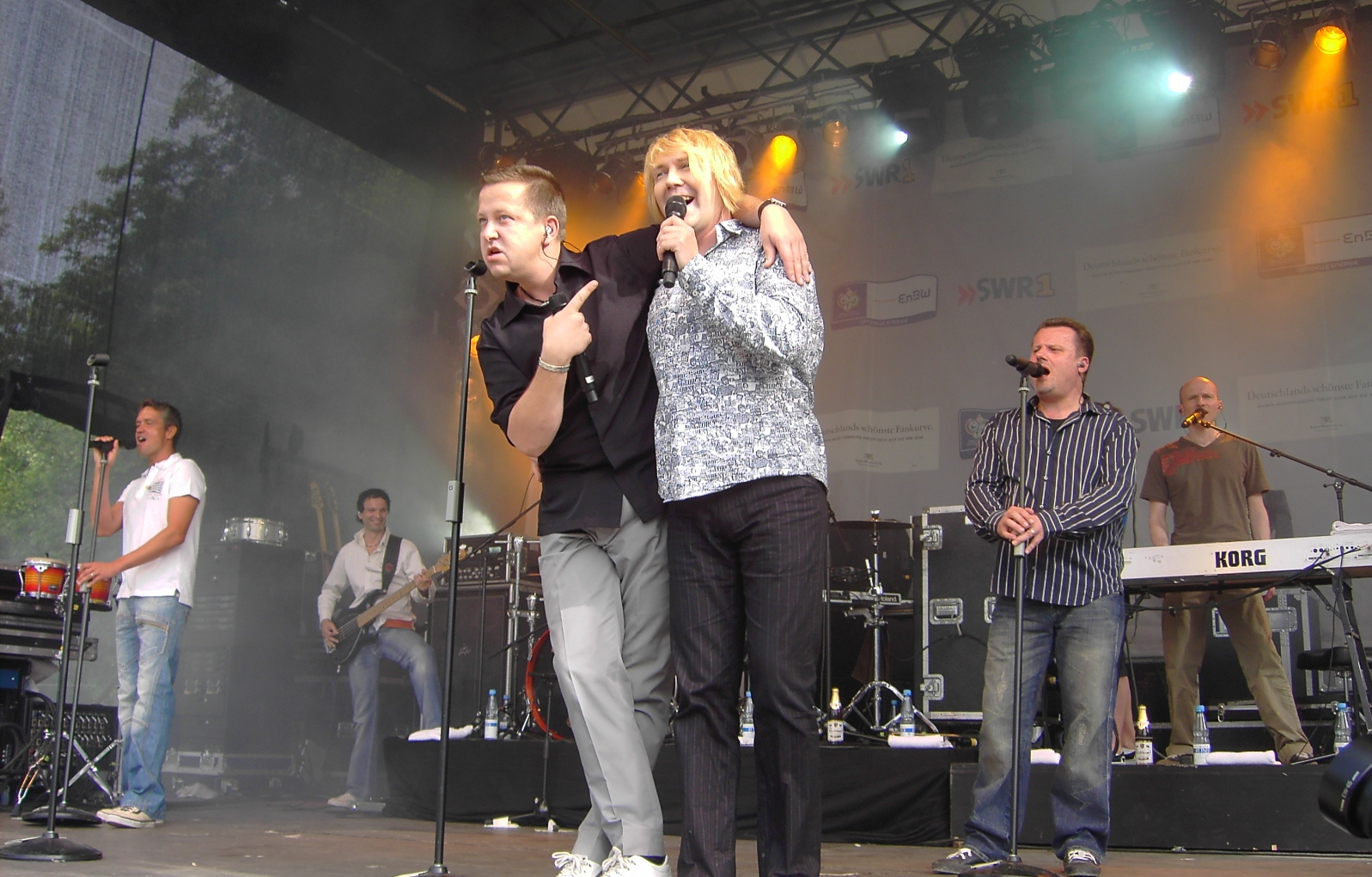
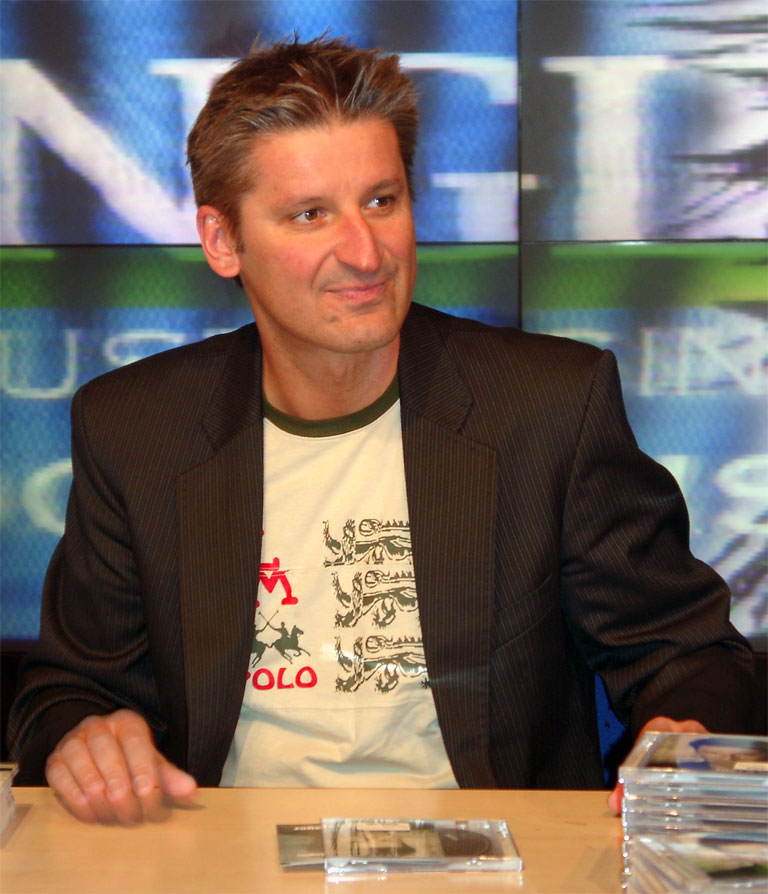
Top to bottom: Andreas Bourani, Daniel Wirtz, Yvonne Catterfeld, Christina Stürmer, Die Prinzen and Hartmut Engler.

=== Show 1 – Yvonne Catterfeld ===
Artist	Song
Andreas Bourani	"Für dich"
Daniel Wirtz	"Du hast mein Herz gebrochen"
Xavier Naidoo	"Die Zeit des Wartens"
Yvonne Catterfeld	"Lieber so"
Christina Stürmer	"Pendel"
Hartmut Engler	"Blau um Blau"
Die Prinzen	"Erinner mich, dich zu vergessen"

=== Show 2 – Andreas Bourani ===
Artist	Song
Die Prinzen	"Nur in meinem Kopf"
Christina Stürmer	"Wieder am Leben"
Hartmut Engler	"Eisberg"
Andreas Bourani	"Ultraleicht"
Yvonne Catterfeld	"Hey"
Daniel Wirtz	"Auf anderen Wegen"
Xavier Naidoo	"Auf uns"

=== Show 3 – Die Prinzen ===
Artist	Song
Christina Stürmer	"Alles nur geklaut"
Hartmut Engler	"Du musst ein Schwein sein"
Daniel Wirtz	"Millionär"
Die Prinzen	"Er steht im Regen" (with Andreas Bourani)
Xavier Naidoo	"Deutschland"
Yvonne Catterfeld	"Küssen verboten"/"Alles mit’m Mund"
Andreas Bourani	"Schlaflied"

=== Show 4 – Christina Stürmer ===
Artist	Song
Hartmut Engler	"Millionen Lichter"
Yvonne Catterfeld	"Ich lebe"
Daniel Wirtz	"Nie genug"
Christina Stürmer	"Was wirklich bleibt"
Andreas Bourani	"Engel fliegen einsam"
Xavier Naidoo	"Mitten unterm Jahr"
Die Prinzen	"Wir leben den Moment"

=== Show 5 – Hartmut Engler ===
Artist	Song
Die Prinzen	"Ich denk an dich"/"Lena"
Christina Stürmer	"Herzbeben"
Yvonne Catterfeld	"Geweint vor Glück"
Hartmut Engler	"Achtung"
Andreas Bourani	"Funkelperlenaugen"
Daniel Wirtz	"Wenn sie diesen Tango hört"
Xavier Naidoo	"Abenteuerland"

=== Show 6 – Daniel Wirtz ===
Artist	Song
Christina Stürmer	"Mon amour"
Andreas Bourani	"Ne Weile her"
Hartmut Engler	"Overkill"
Daniel Wirtz	"Keine Angst"
Xavier Naidoo	"Frei"
Die Prinzen	"Hier"
Yvonne Catterfeld	"L.M.A.A. – Leck mich am Arsch"

=== Show 7 – Xavier Naidoo (Söhne Mannheims) ===
Artist	Song
Andreas Bourani	"Zurück zu dir"
Daniel Wirtz	"Vielleicht"
Yvonne Catterfeld	"Geh' davon aus"
Xavier Naidoo	"Rosenblätter"
Hartmut Engler	"Freiheit"
Christina Stürmer	"Volle Kraft voraus"
Die Prinzen	"Wenn du schläfst"

== Season 3 ==
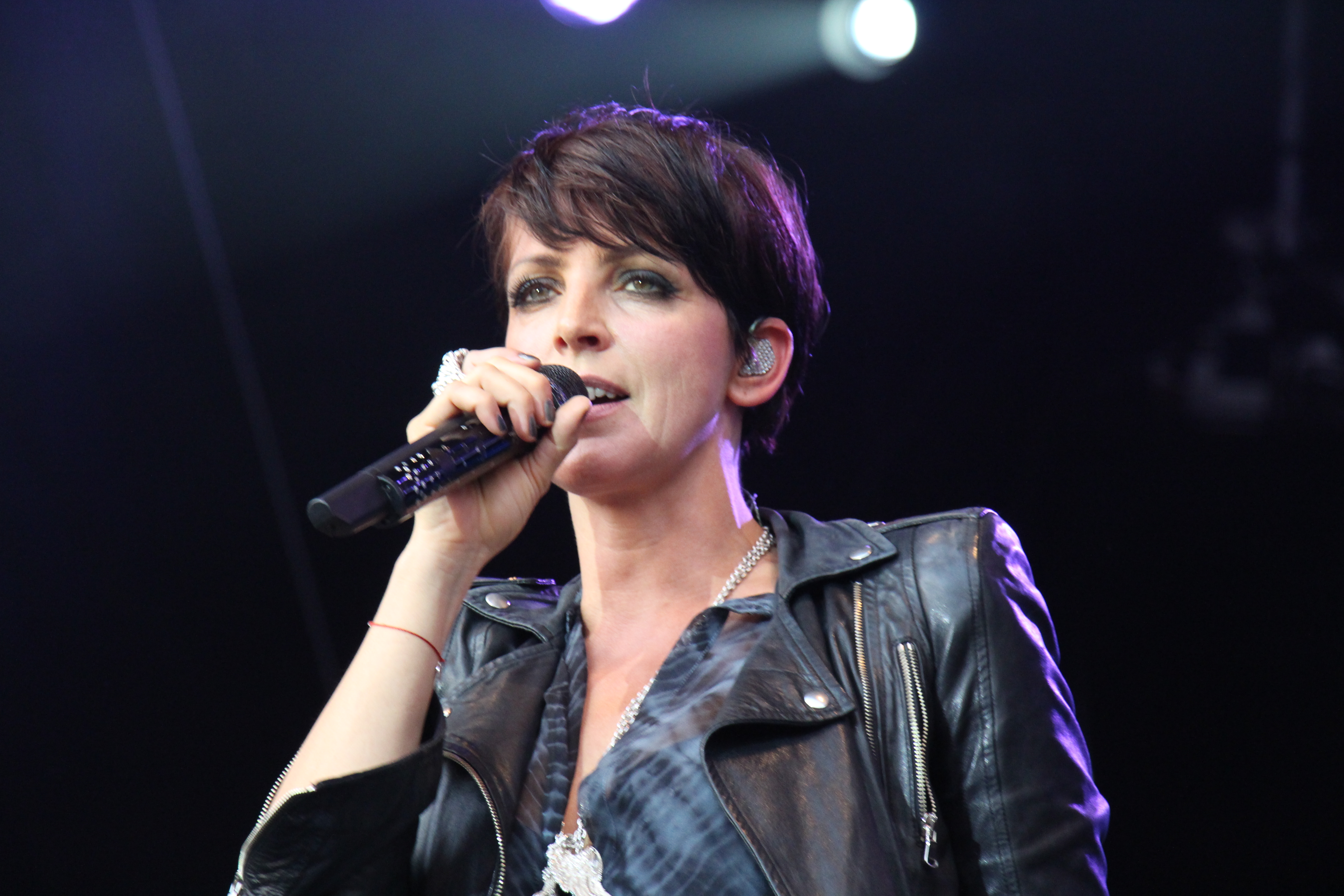
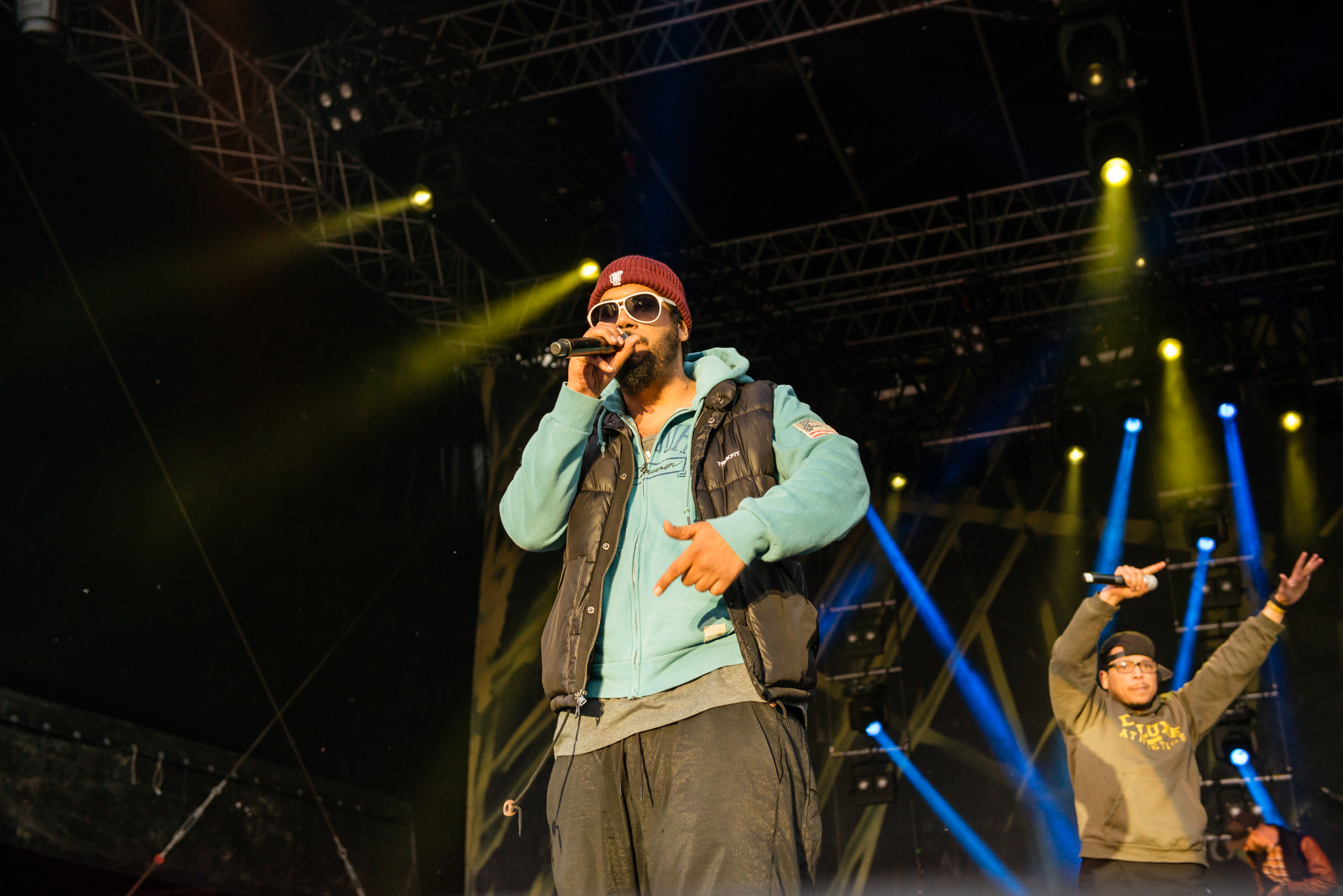
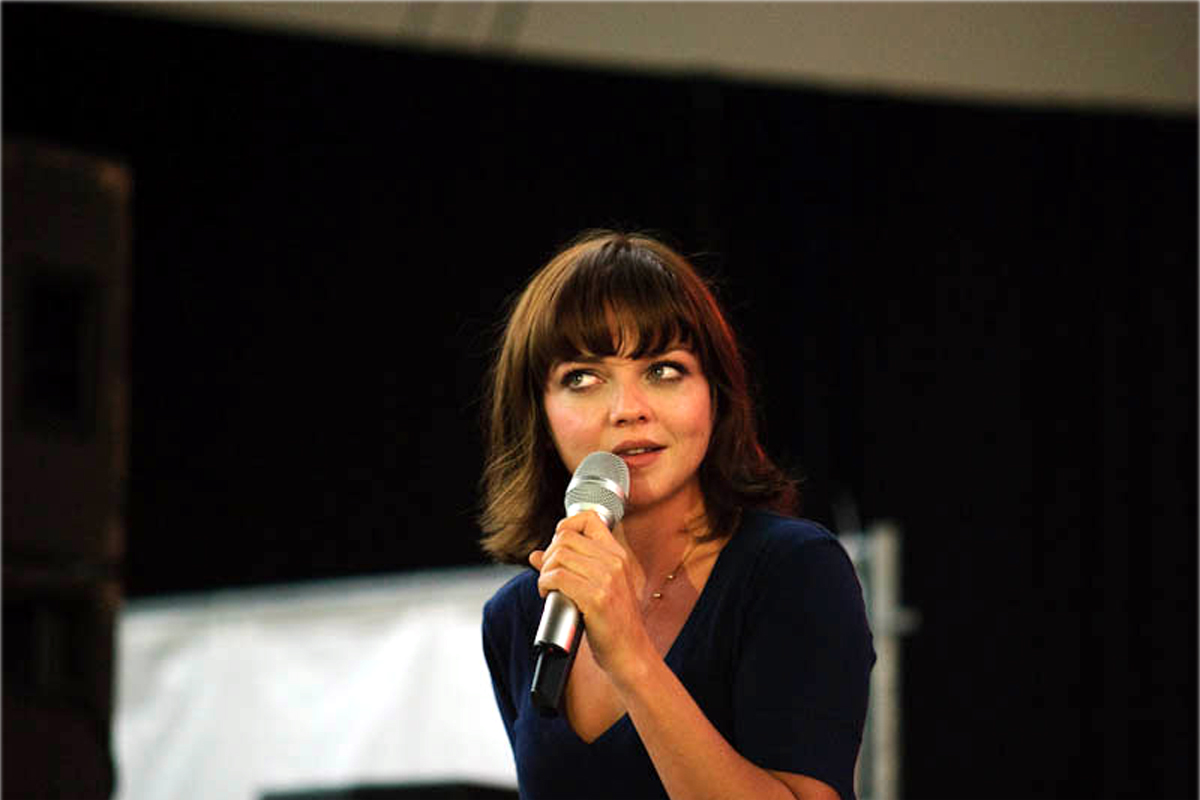
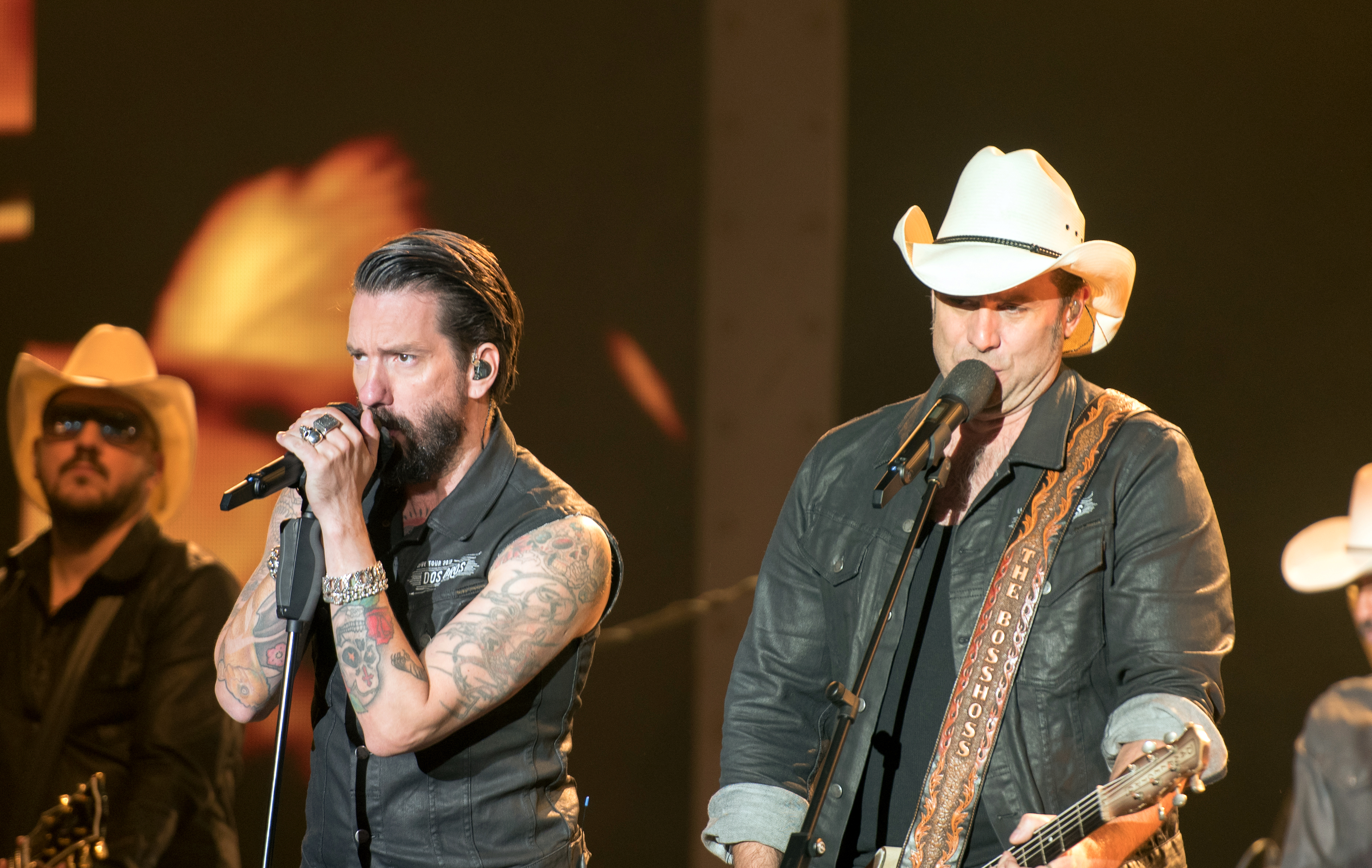
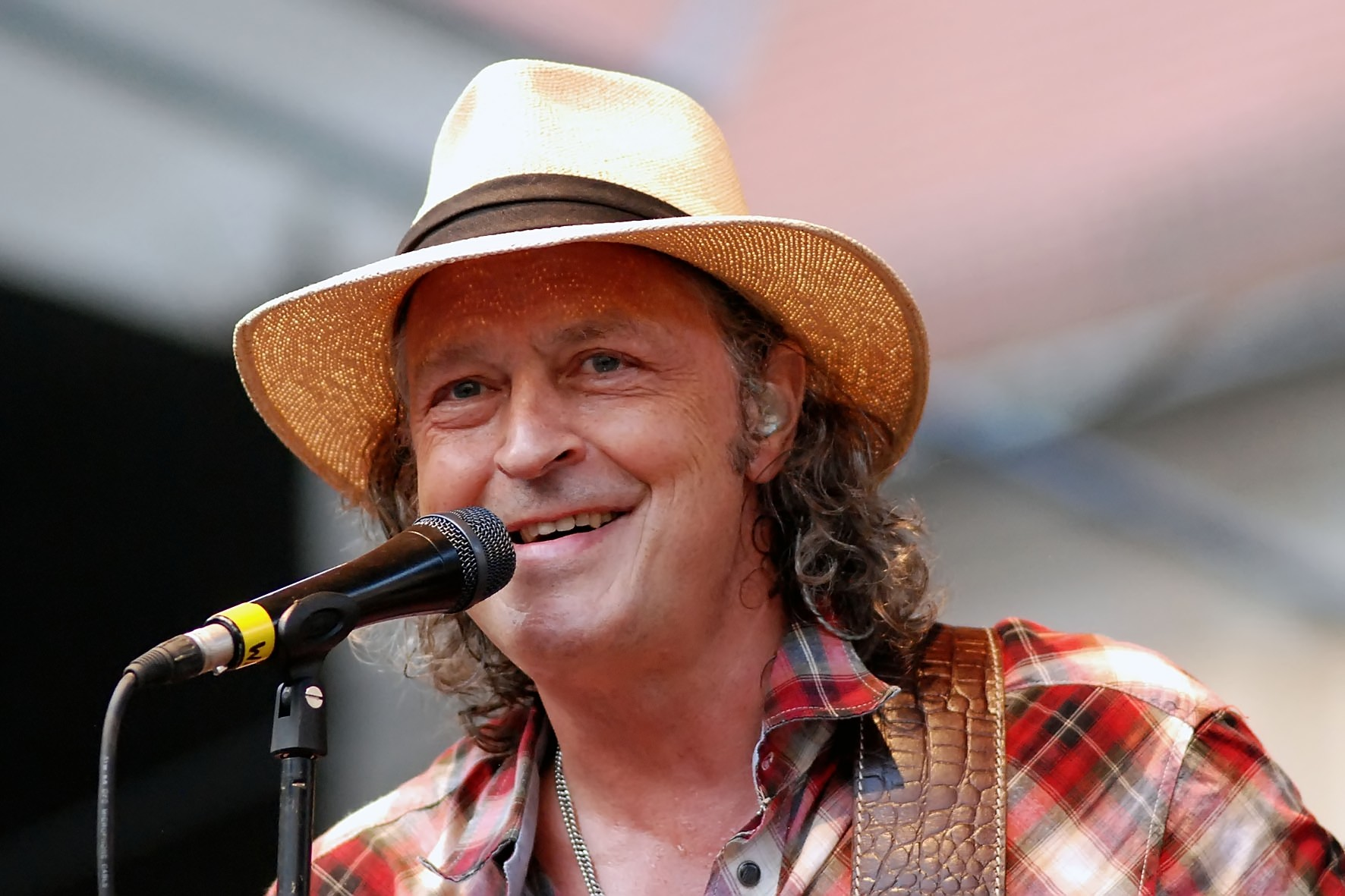
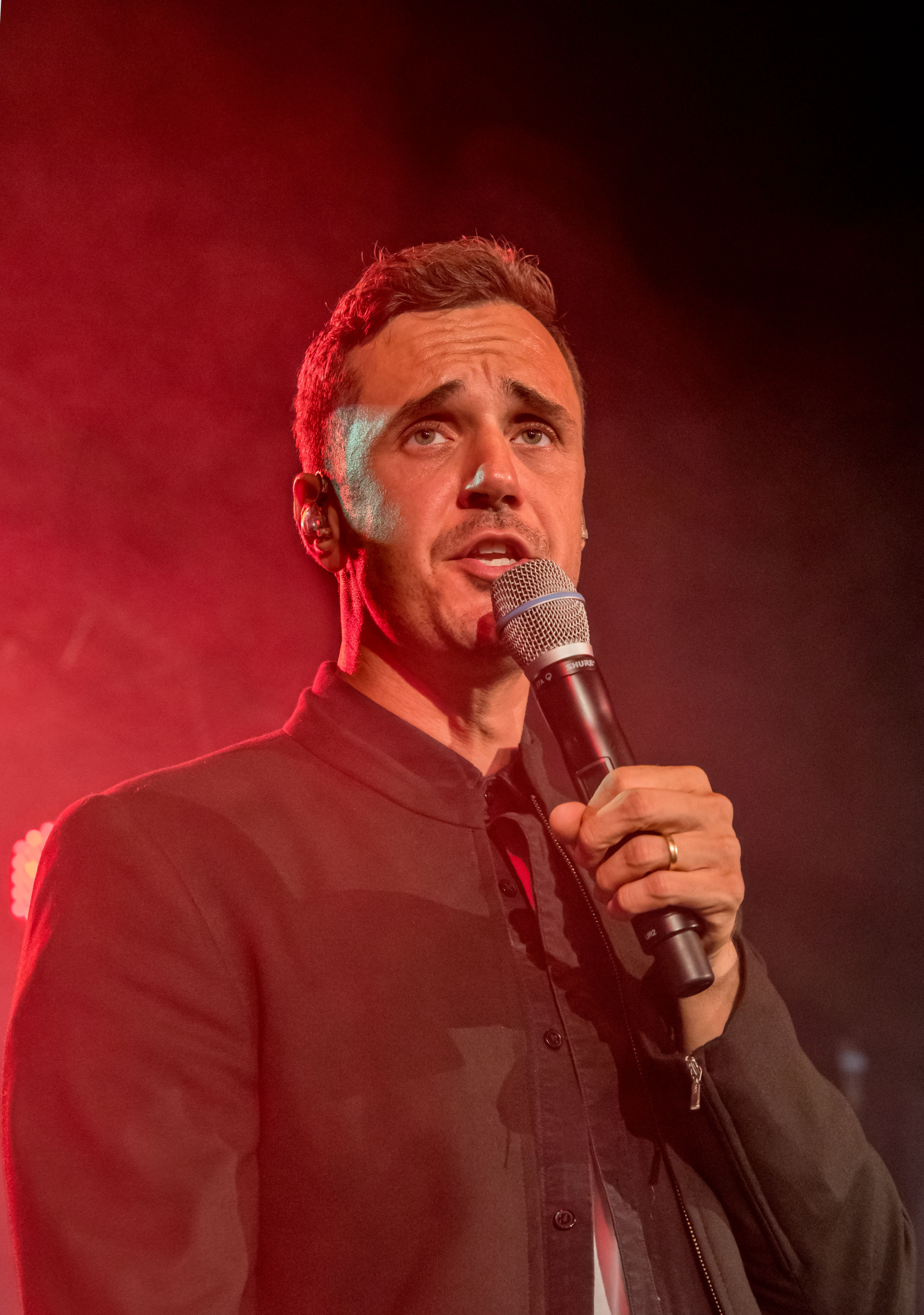
Top to bottom: Nena, Samy Deluxe, Annett Louisan, The BossHoss, Wolfgang Niedecken, and Seven.

=== Show 1 – Nena ===
Artist	Song
The BossHoss	"Leuchtturm"
Samy Deluxe	"Berufsjugendlich"
Annett Louisan	"Nur geträumt"
Nena	"Genau jetzt"
Seven	"99 Luftballons"
Xavier Naidoo	"Wunder gescheh'n"
Wolfgang Niedecken	"Liebe ist"

=== Show 2 – Seven ===
Artist	Song
Xavier Naidoo	"Go Slow"
Samy Deluxe	"Lost"
Annett Louisan	"City of Gold"
Nena	"Mon dernier jour (What If)"
Seven	"I Don't Give Up"
Wolfgang Niedecken	"Lisa"
The BossHoss	"Wake Up"

=== Show 3 – The BossHoss ===
Artist	Song
Nena	"Don't Gimme That"
Wolfgang Niedecken	"My Personal Song"
Samy Deluxe	"Shake & Shout"
The BossHoss	"I Like It Like That"
Annett Louisan	"Close"
Seven	"Sex on Legs"
Xavier Naidoo	"Go! Go! Go!"

=== Show 4 – Samy Deluxe ===
Artist	Song
The BossHoss	"Superheld"
Seven	"Hab gehört"
Nena	"Fantasie"
Xavier Naidoo	"Weck mich auf"
Samy Deluxe	"Haus am Mehr"
Annett Louisan	"Herz gebrochen"
Wolfgang Niedecken	"Bis die Sonne rauskommt"

=== Show 5 – Wolfgang Niedecken ===
Artist	Song
Xavier Naidoo	"Songs sind Träume"
Annett Louisan	"Verdammt lang her"
Seven	"All die Aureblecke"
Wolfgang Niedecken	"Alles relativ"
The BossHoss	"Alles im Lot"
Samy Deluxe	"Kristallnacht"
Nena	"Du kannst zaubern"

=== Show 6 – Annett Louisan ===
Artist	Song
Wolfgang Niedecken	"Wenn man sich nicht mehr liebt"
The BossHoss	"Das Spiel"
Nena	"Läuft alles perfekt"
Annett Louisan	"Meine Kleine"
Samy Deluxe	"Stell’ dir vor, dass unten oben ist"
Seven	"Du fehlst mir so"
Xavier Naidoo	"Das Gefühl"

=== Show 7 – Xavier Naidoo ===
Artist	Song
Samy Deluxe	"Alles kann besser werden"
Nena	"Freisein"
Seven	"Das hat die Welt noch nicht gesehn"
Xavier Naidoo	"Das lass ich nicht zu"
Annett Louisan	"Ich wär gar nichts ohne dich"
The BossHoss	"Schau nicht mehr zurück"
Wolfgang Niedecken	"Was wir alleine nicht schaffen"

=== Accompanying album ===
The album to accompany the series ("Sing meinen Song - Das Tauschkonzert Vol. 3") comprised 14 tracks (2 by each of the participants). The deluxe version comprised 5 tracks performed in the shows by Xavier Naidoo and 4 by each of the other participants. In May 2016 it entered the German charts at No.2.

== Season 4 ==
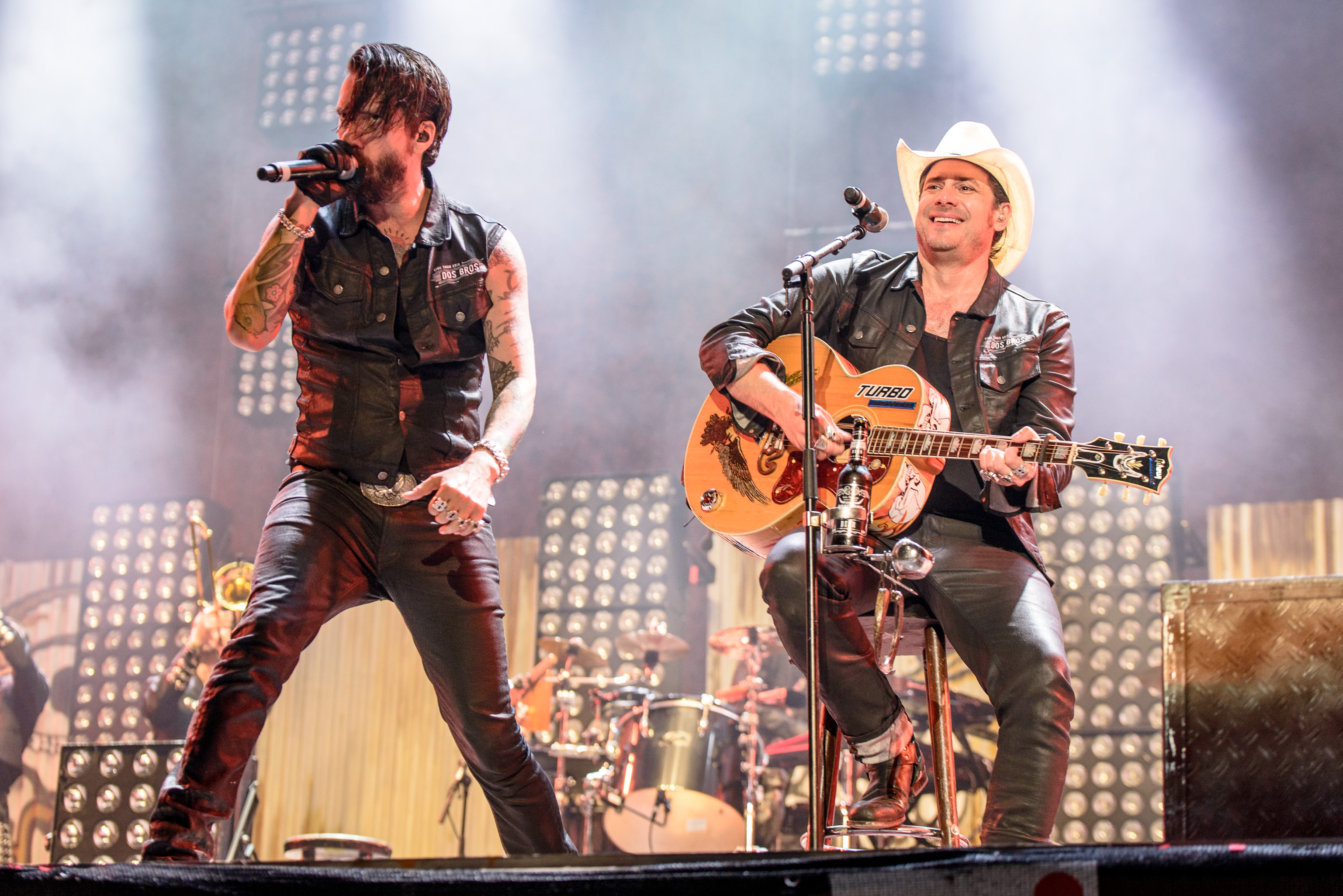
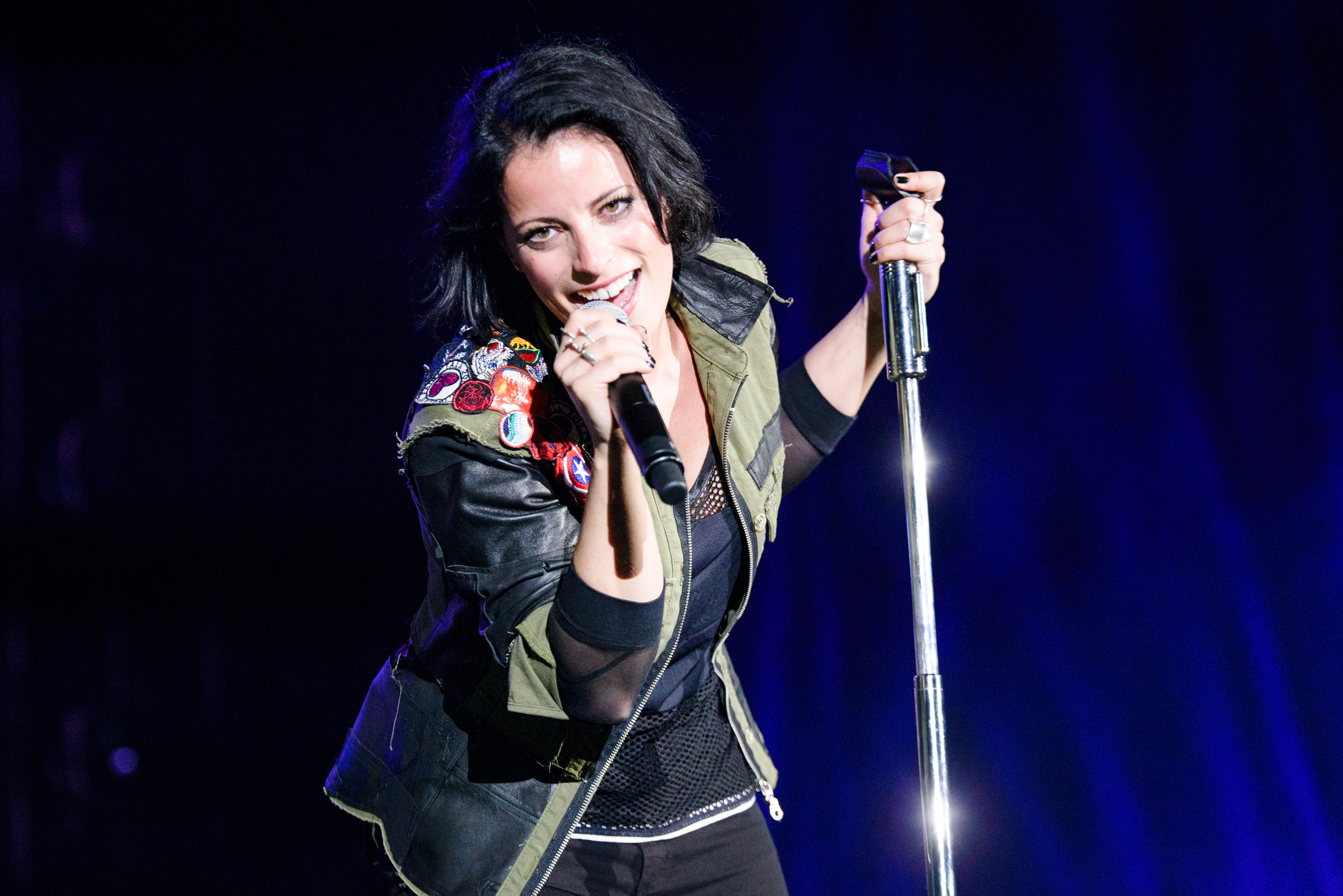
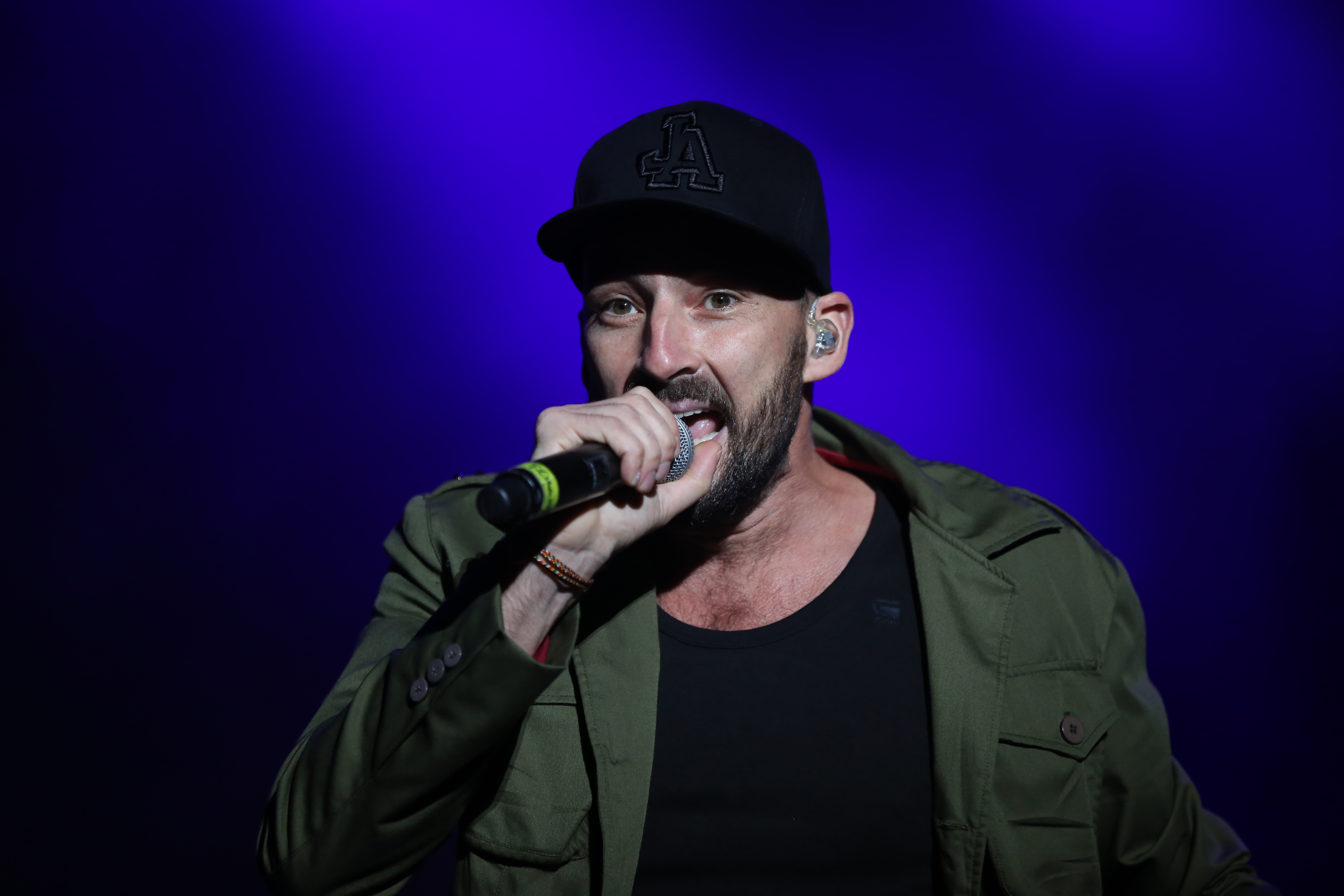
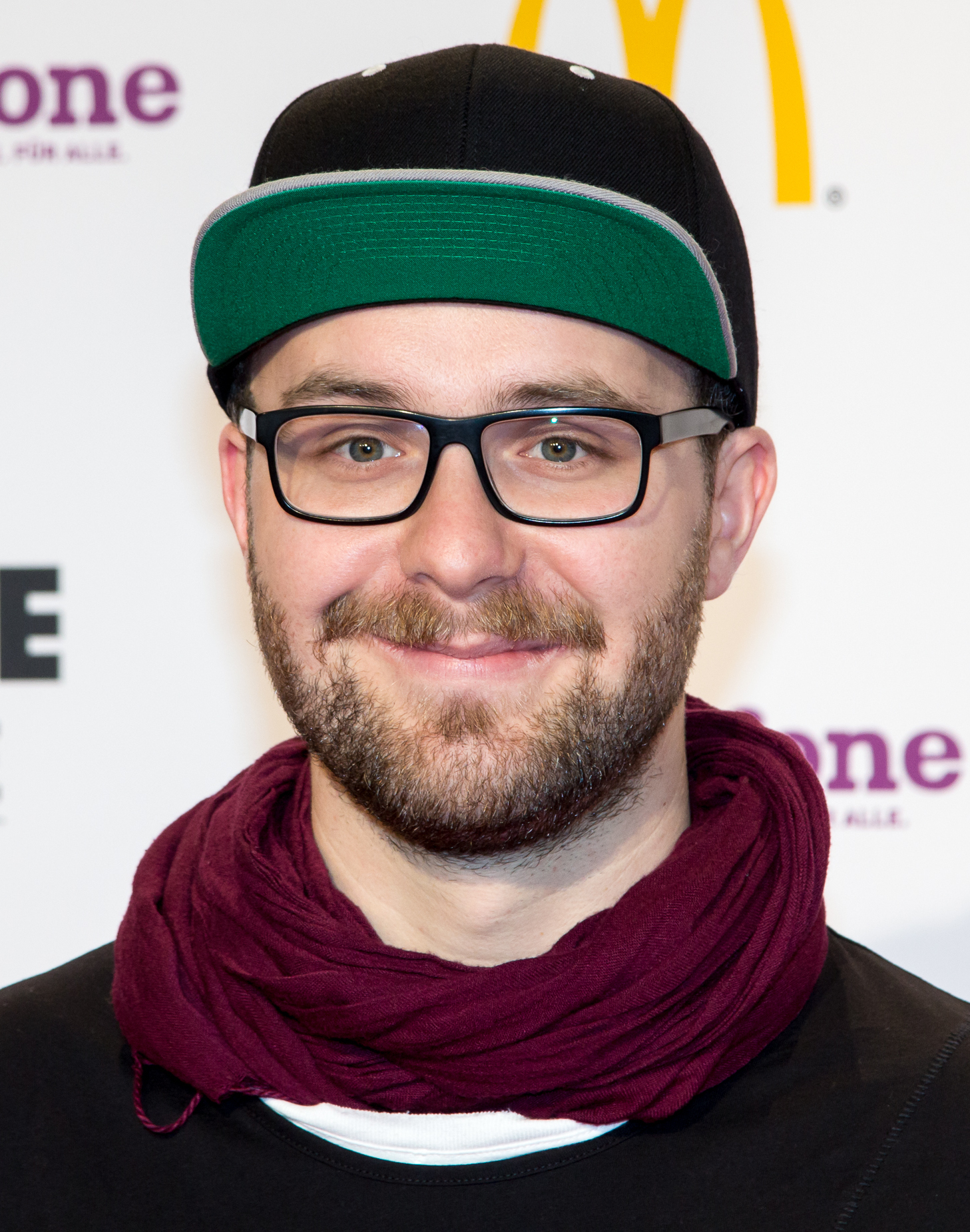
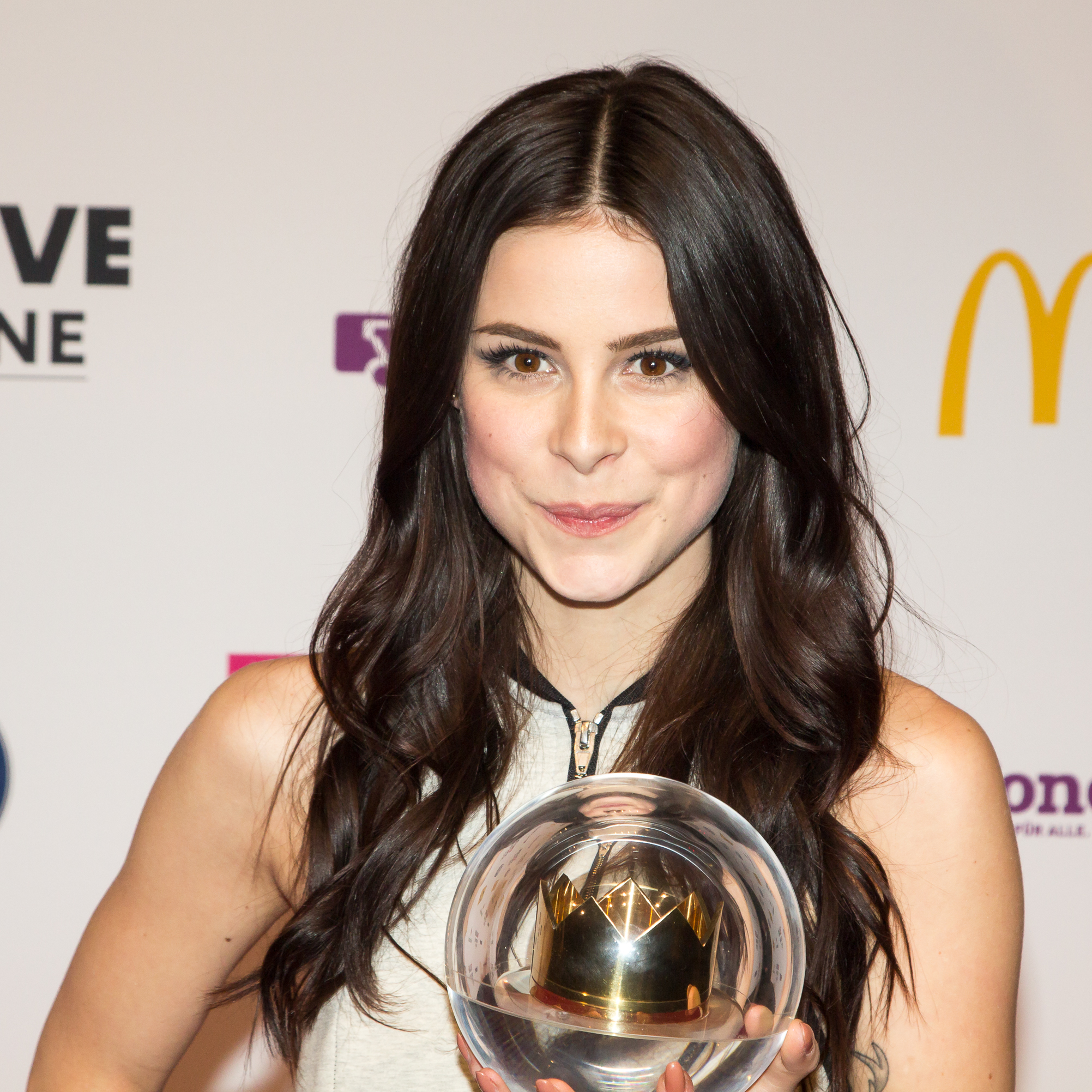
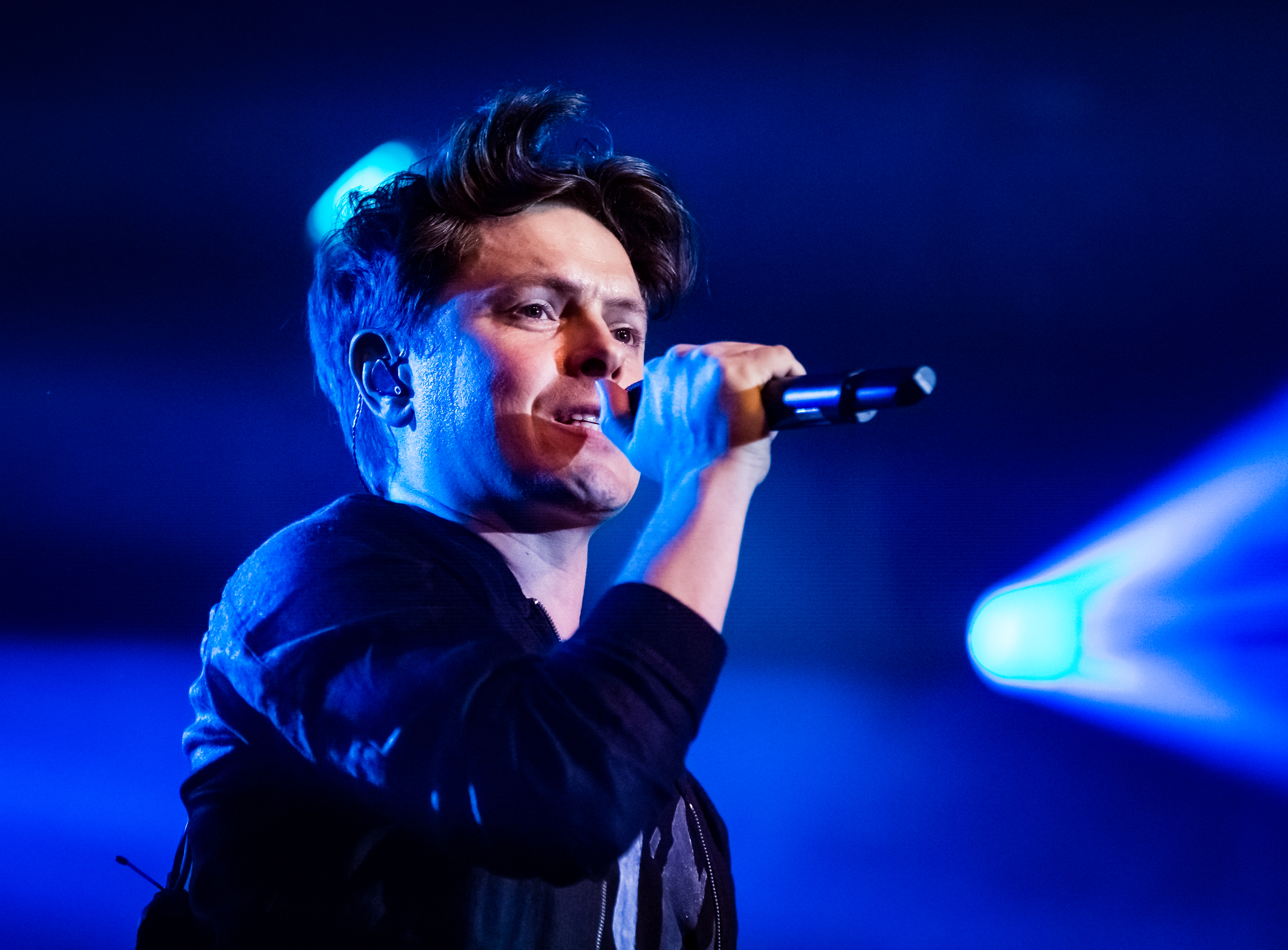
Top to bottom: The BossHoss, Stefanie Kloß, Gentleman, Mark Forster, Lena, and Michael Patrick Kelly.

The fourth season of Sing meinen Song included the following artists: The BossHoss, Stefanie Kloß, Gentleman, Mark Forster, Lena, Michael Patrick Kelly, and Moses Pelham.

=== Show 1 – Mark Forster ===
Artist	Song
Stefanie Kloß	"Au revoir"
Michael Patrick Kelly	"Flüsterton"
Gentleman	"Ich trink auf dich"
Mark Forster	"Sowieso"
Lena	"Natalie"
The BossHoss	"Flash mich"
Moses Pelham	"Oh Love" (with Cassandra Steen)

=== Show 2 – Stefanie Kloß ===
Artist	Song
Lena	"Durch die Nacht"
Gentleman	"Heute hab ich Zeit"
Moses Pelham	"Symphonie" (with Cassandra Steen)
Stefanie Kloß	"Leichtes Gepäck"
The BossHoss	"Weiße Fahnen"
Michael Patrick Kelly	"Krieger des Lichts"
Mark Forster	"Irgendwas bleibt"

=== Show 3 – Lena ===
Artist	Song
Stefanie Kloß	"Stardust"
Mark Forster	"Satellite"
The BossHoss	"Taken by a Stranger"
Lena	"If I Wasn't Your Daughter"
Gentleman	"Beat to My Melody"
Moses Pelham	"Meine Heimat" ("Home") (featuring Stefanie Kloß)
Michael Patrick Kelly	"Traffic Lights"

=== Show 4 – Moses Pelham ===
Artist	Song
The BossHoss	"Höha, Schnella, Weita"
Stefanie Kloß	"Eigentlich gut"
Michael Patrick Kelly	"Führ mich ans Licht"
Glashaus	"Gegen den Strom"
Gentleman	"Mos Lied"
Lena	"Du liebst mich nicht"
Mark Forster	"Was immer es ist"

=== Show 5 – Michael Patrick Kelly ===
Artist	Song
Moses Pelham	"Wer kommt mit mir?" ("David's Song") (featuring Cassandra Steen)
Mark Forster	"Fell in Love with an Alien"
Stefanie Kloß	"An Angel"
Michael Patrick Kelly	"Golden Age"
Gentleman	"Shake Away"
Lena	"Mama"
The BossHoss	"No Fuzz, No Buzz, Back to Rock ’n’ Roll"

=== Show 6 – Gentleman ===
Artist	Song
Lena	"Superior"
Moses Pelham	"You Remember"
The BossHoss	"Heart of Rub-a-Dub"
Gentleman	"Red Town"
Michael Patrick Kelly	"Memories"
Mark Forster	"Dem Gone"
Stefanie Kloß	"It No Pretty"

=== Show 7 – The BossHoss ===
Artist	Song
Michael Patrick Kelly	"Stallion Battalion"
Mark Forster	"Das Werk des Cowboys ist nie getan"
Moses Pelham	"M zum O"
The BossHoss	"Mary Marry Me"
Gentleman	"Today Tomorrow Too Long Too Late"
Lena	"Break Free"
Stefanie Kloß	"Liberty of Action"

== Season 5 ==
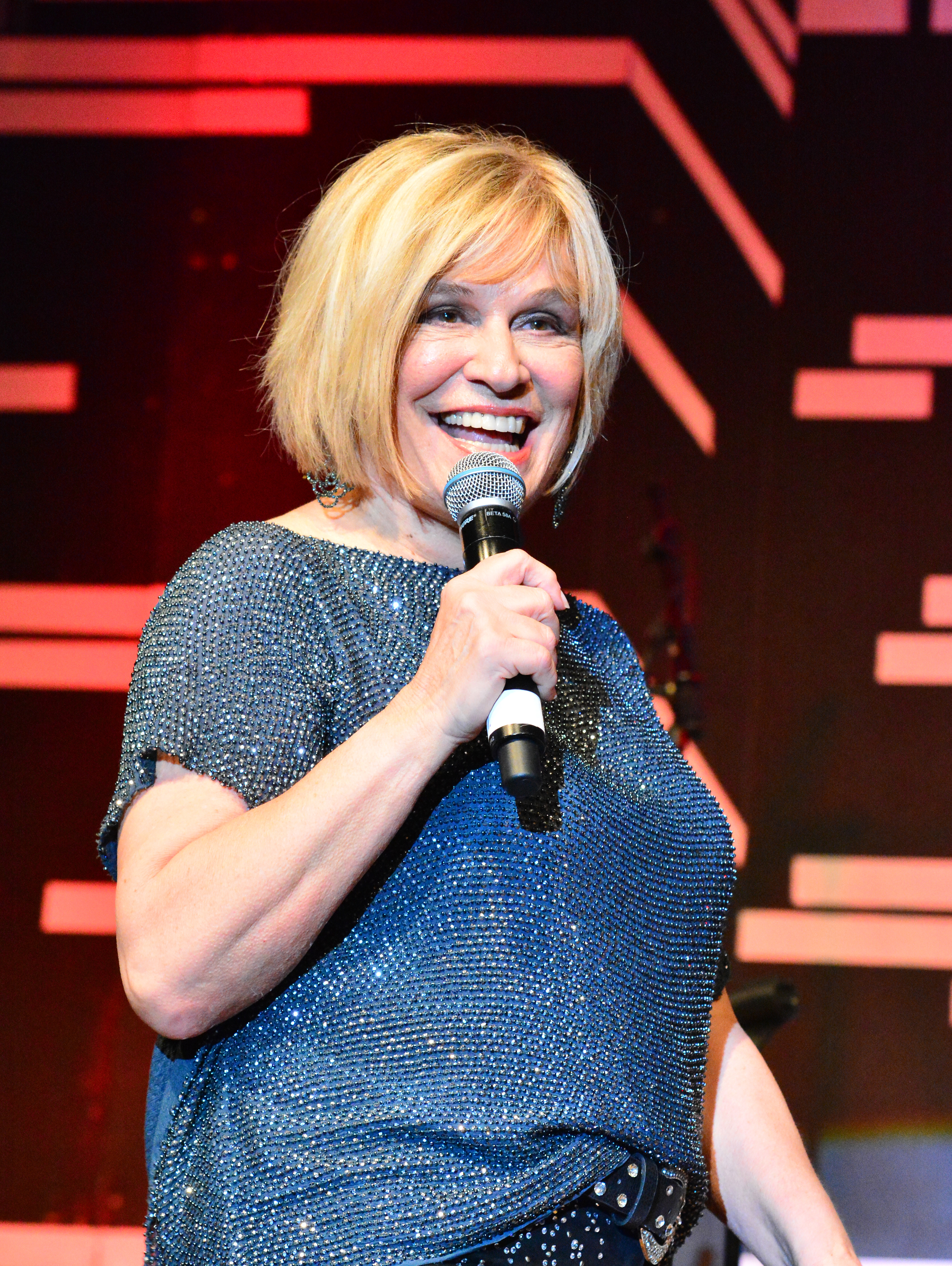
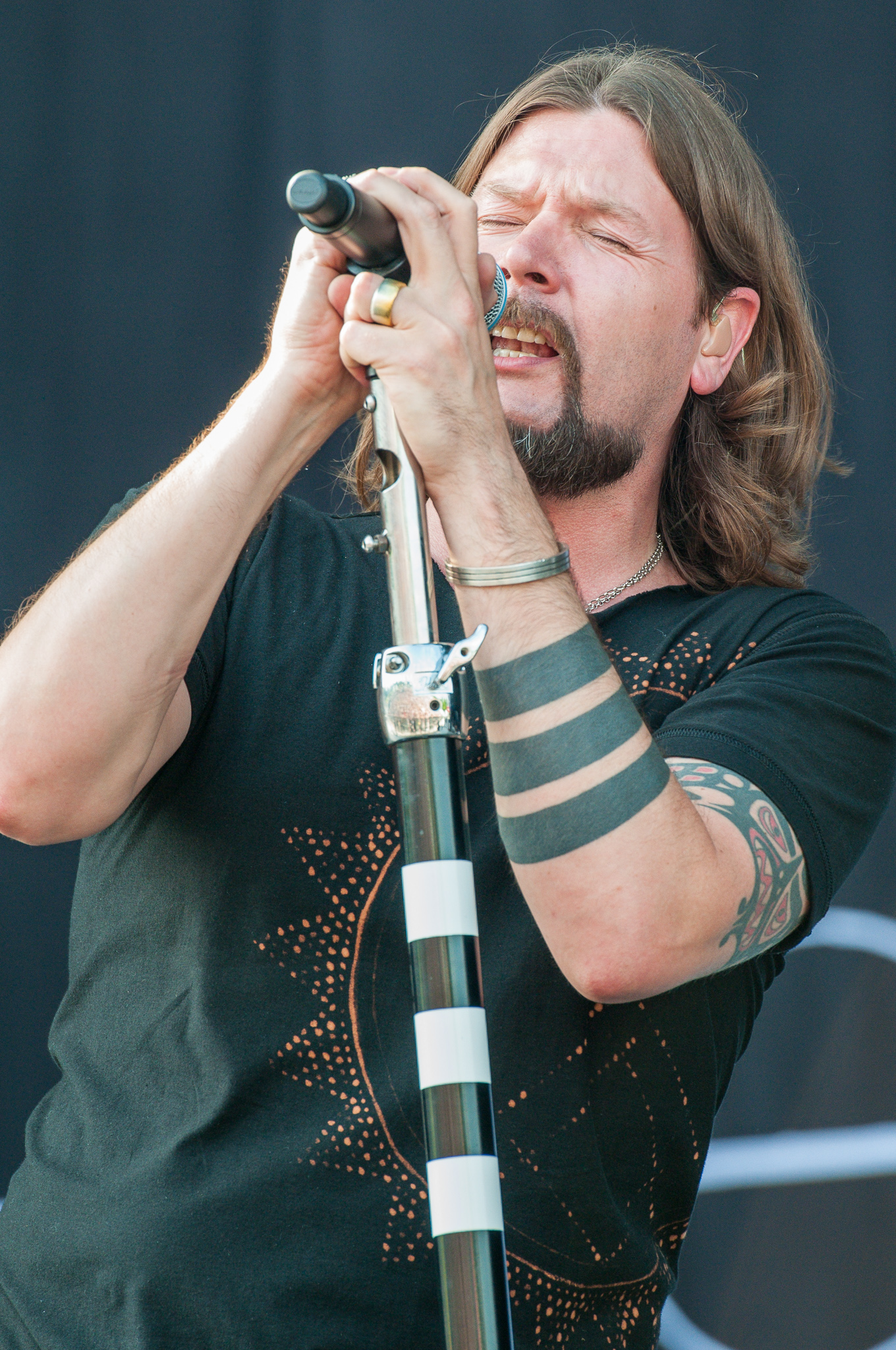
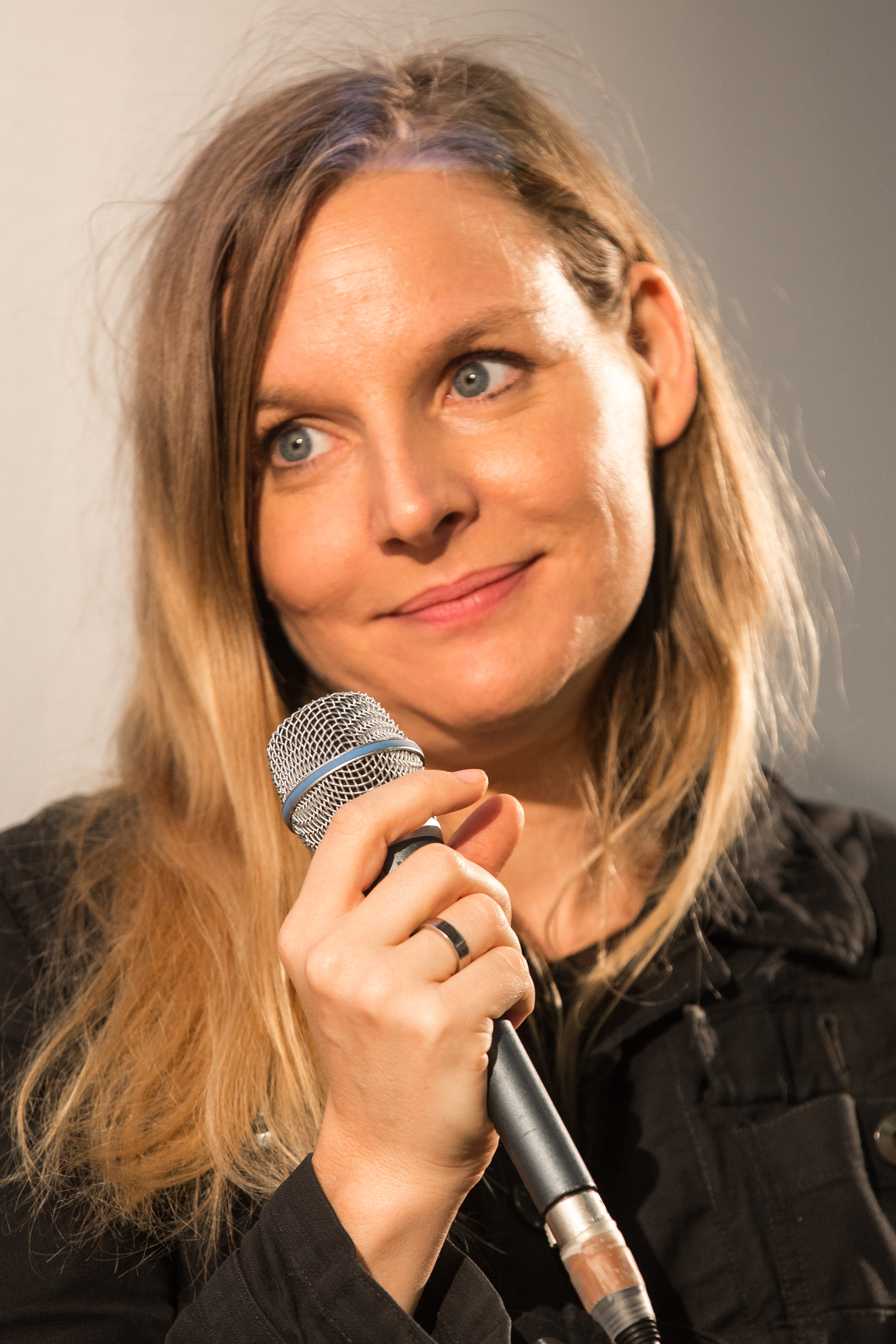
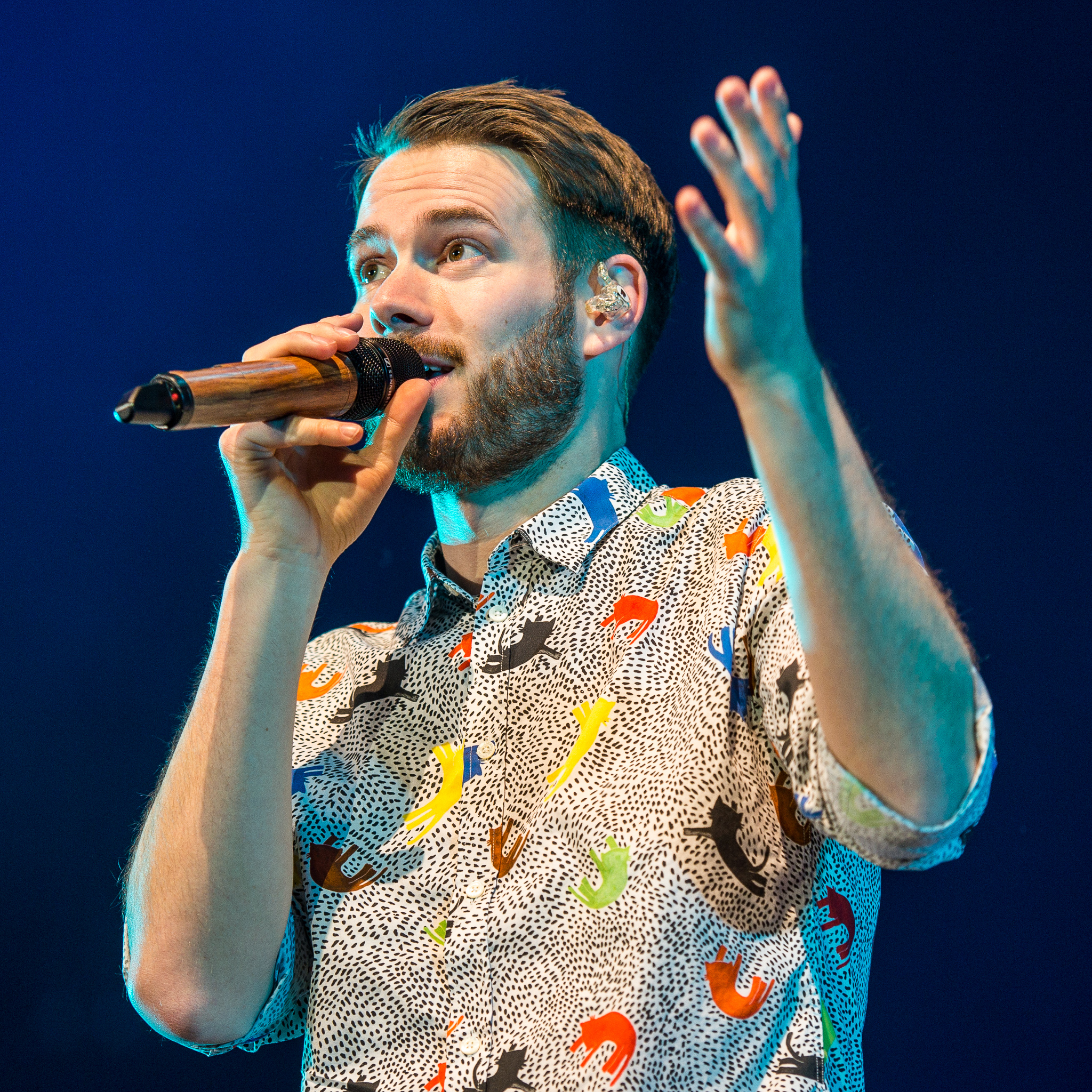
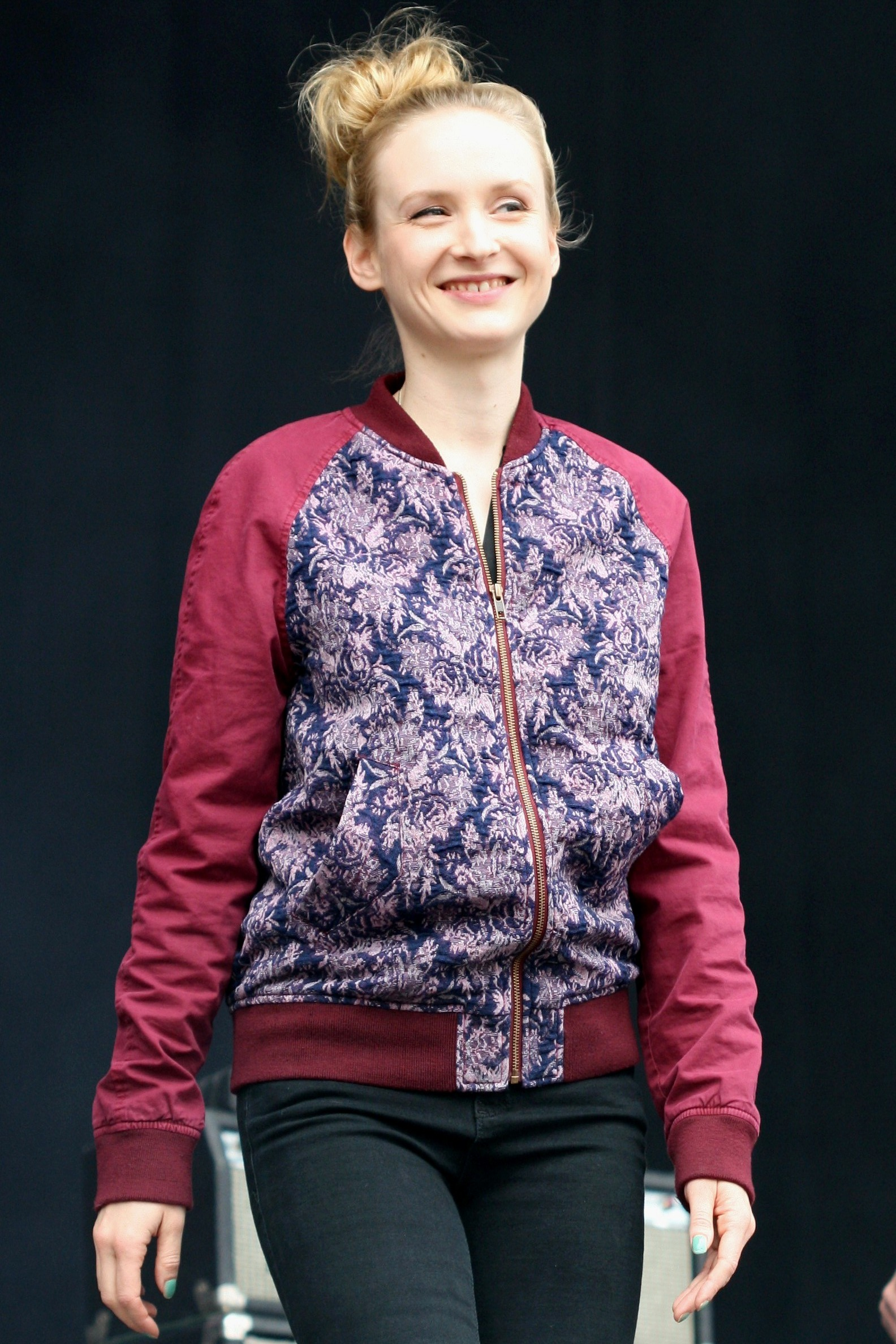
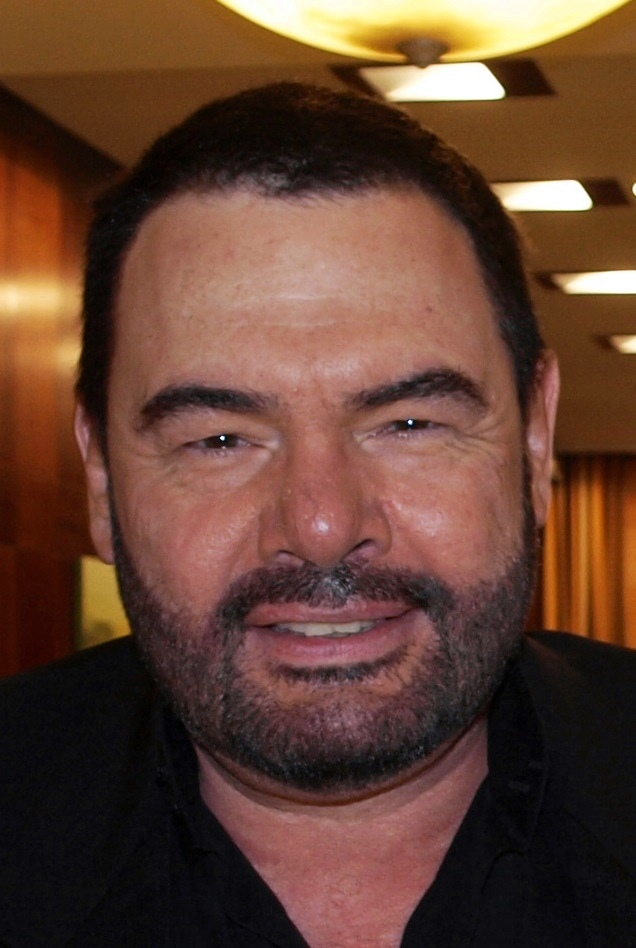
Top to bottom: Mary Roos, Rea Garvey, Judith Holofernes, Johannes Strate, Leslie Clio and Marian Gold.

The fifth season of Sing meinen Song included the following artists: Mark Forster, Mary Roos, Rea Garvey, Judith Holofernes, Johannes Strate, Leslie Clio and Marian Gold.

=== Show 1 – Johannes Strate ===
Artist	Song
Rea Garvey	"Lass uns gehen"
Judith Holofernes	"Ich lass für dich das Licht an"
Mark Forster	"Wenn es um uns brennt"
Revolverheld	"Zimmer mit Blick"
Marian Gold	"Keine Liebeslieder"
Leslie Clio	"Halt dich an mir fest"
Mary Roos	"Spinner"

=== Show 2 – Rea Garvey ===
Artist	Song
Marian Gold	"Oh My Love"
Johannes Strate	"Supergirl"
Mary Roos	"Through the Eyes of a Child"
Judith Holofernes	"Armour"
Rea Garvey	"Is It Love" (with Mark Forster)
Leslie Clio	"Wild Love"
Mark Forster	"Bow Before You "

=== Show 3 – Judith Holofernes ===
Artist	Song
Rea Garvey	"Guten Tag"
Leslie Clio	"Müssen nur wollen"
Mary Roos	"Nur ein Wort"
Judith Holofernes	"Der letzte Optimist"
Mark Forster	"Oder an die Freude"
Marian Gold	"Bring mich nach Hause"
Johannes Strate	"Denkmal"

=== Show 4 – Marian Gold ===
Artist	Song
Rea Garvey	"Big in Japan"
Mary Roos	"I Die for You Today"
Judith Holofernes	"Jet Set"
Marian Gold	"Because of You"
Leslie Clio	"Song for No One"
Mark Forster	"Flame"
Johannes Strate	"Forever Young"

=== Show 5 – Mary Roos ===
Artist	Song
Judith Holofernes	"Geh nicht den Weg"
Leslie Clio	"Arizona Man"
Mark Forster	"Nur die Liebe läßt uns leben"
Mary Roos	"Zu schön um wahr zu sein"
Johannes Strate	"Amour Toujours (Morgens um 5)"
Marian Gold	"Schau dich nicht um"
Rea Garvey	"Aufrecht geh'n"

=== Show 6 – Leslie Clio ===
Artist	Song
Mark Forster	"I Couldn't Care Less"
Judith Holofernes	"Be With You"
Mary Roos	"Sister Sun, Brother Moon"
Leslie Clio	"Rumours"
Marian Gold	"Game Changer"
Johannes Strate	"Damage Done"
Rea Garvey	"Fragile"

=== Show 7 – Mark Forster ===
Artist	Song
Leslie Clio	"Auf dem Weg "
Johannes Strate	"Bauch und Kopf"
Mary Roos	"Zu dir (weit weg)"
Mark Forster	"Like a Lion" (featuring Gentleman)
Marian Gold	"Wir sind groß"
Rea Garvey	"Stimme"
Judith Holofernes	"Kogong"

== Season 6 ==
In October 2018, it was announced that Michael Patrick Kelly will replace Mark Forster as the show's host in season six. Kelly will be joined by Belgian musician Milow and Spanish-German singer Álvaro Soler as well as German singers Wincent Weiss, Johannes Oerding, Jeanette Biedermann, and Jennifer Haben from metal band Beyond the Black.

== See also ==
- The Best Singers (series)
