= Staub & Fantasie =

Studio album by Andreas Bourani
- Released: 10 June 2011
- Length: 54:10
- Label: Vertigo Berlin
- Producer: Andreas Bourani; Julius Hartog; Andreas Herbig; Tom Olbrich; Peter Seifert

Andreas Bourani chronology
Staub & Fantasie (2011)	Hey (2014)

Staub & Fantasie (German: Dust & Fantasy) is the debut studio album by German recording artist Andreas Bourani, released by Vertigo Berlin on 10 June 2011 in German-speaking Europe.

== Critical reception ==
Professional ratings
Review scores
Source	Rating
laut.de	3/5 stars

laut.de editor Kai Butterweck rated the album three stars out of five. He found that "Bourani's producers limit themselves to little synth and electro monotony and rather give his voice room to develop. So in the end Staub & Fantasie remains just a passable pop album."

== Track listing ==
Staub & Fantasie track listing
No.	Title	Writer(s)	Producer(s)	Length
1.	"Nur in meinem Kopf"	Andreas Bourani; Tom Olbrich; Julius Hartog	Andreas Herbig; Peter "Jem" Seifert	3:49
2.	"Wunder"	Bourani; Hartog	Herbig; Seifert	4:09
3.	"Zusammen untergegangen"	Bourani; Olbrich; Hartog	Herbig; Seifert	3:24
4.	"Mit der Zeit"	Bourani; Hartog	Herbig; Seifert	4:26
5.	"Glück"	Bourani; Jen Bender; Raphael Schalz; Hartog	Herbig; Seifert	4:30
6.	"Sicher"	Bourani; Olbrich; Hartog	Herbig; Seifert	4:07
7.	"Eisberg"	Bourani; Olbrich; Hartog	Herbig; Seifert	4:23
8.	"Eden für dich"	Bourani; Hartog	Herbig; Seifert	4:15
9.	"Du und ich und sie"	Axel Bosse; Olbrich; Hartog	Herbig; Seifert	3:13
10.	"So leicht so schwer"	Bourani; Hartog	Bourani; Hartog; Olbrich	4:44
11.	"Fremder Planet"	Bourani; Hartog; Jan Stolter-Foht; Philipp Otto Block	Herbig; Seifert	4:32
12.	"Frieden"	Bourani; Hartog; Ralf Hildenbeutel	Herbig; Seifert	5:16
13.	"Du lässt dich gehen"	Bourani; Hartog	Herbig; Seifert	3:16
Total length:				54:10

== Charts ==
Weekly chart performance for Staub & Fantasie
Chart (2014–15)	Peak position
Austrian Albums (Ö3 Austria)	27
German Albums (Offizielle Top 100)	23
Swiss Albums (Schweizer Hitparade)	22

== Certifications ==
Certifications for Staub & Fantasie
Region	Certification	Certified units/sales
Germany (BVMI)	Gold	100,000^{‡}
^{‡} Sales+streaming figures based on certification alone.
