= Hey (Andreas Bourani song) =

Single by Andreas Bourani

from the album Hey
- Released: 4 December 2015
- Genre: Pop; pop rock
- Length: 4:34
- Label: Universal
- Songwriters: Andreas Bourani; Julius Hartog; Jasmin Shakeri; Philipp Steinke
- Producer: Philipp Steinke

Andreas Bourani singles chronology
"Ultraleicht" (2015)	"Hey" (2015)

"Hey" is a song by German recording artist Andreas Bourani. It was written by Bourani along with Julius Hartog, Jasmin Shakeri, and Philipp Steinke for his second album Hey (2014), while production was helmed by the latter. The ballad was released as the album's fourth and final single. It reached the top thirty in Germany and the top forty on the Swiss Singles Chart upon its December 2015 release. A live cover version of "Hey", recorded by pop singer Yvonne Catterfeld during her performance on the second season of reality television series Sing meinen Song – Das Tauschkonzert, the German version of The Best Singers series, had previously reached the top twenty on the German Singles Chart.

== Formats and track listings ==
CD Single
No.	Title	Length
1.	"Hey" (Radio Version)	3:58
2.	"Hey" (Live)	5:05

== Charts ==
=== Yvonne Catterfeld version ===
Chart (2014)	Peak position
Austria (Ö3 Austria Top 40)	27
Germany (GfK)	17
Switzerland (Schweizer Hitparade)	29

=== Andreas Bourani version ===
Chart (2015)	Peak position
Austria (Ö3 Austria Top 40)	46
Germany (GfK)	30
Switzerland (Schweizer Hitparade)	36
