= Andreas Bourani =

German pop singer (born 1983)

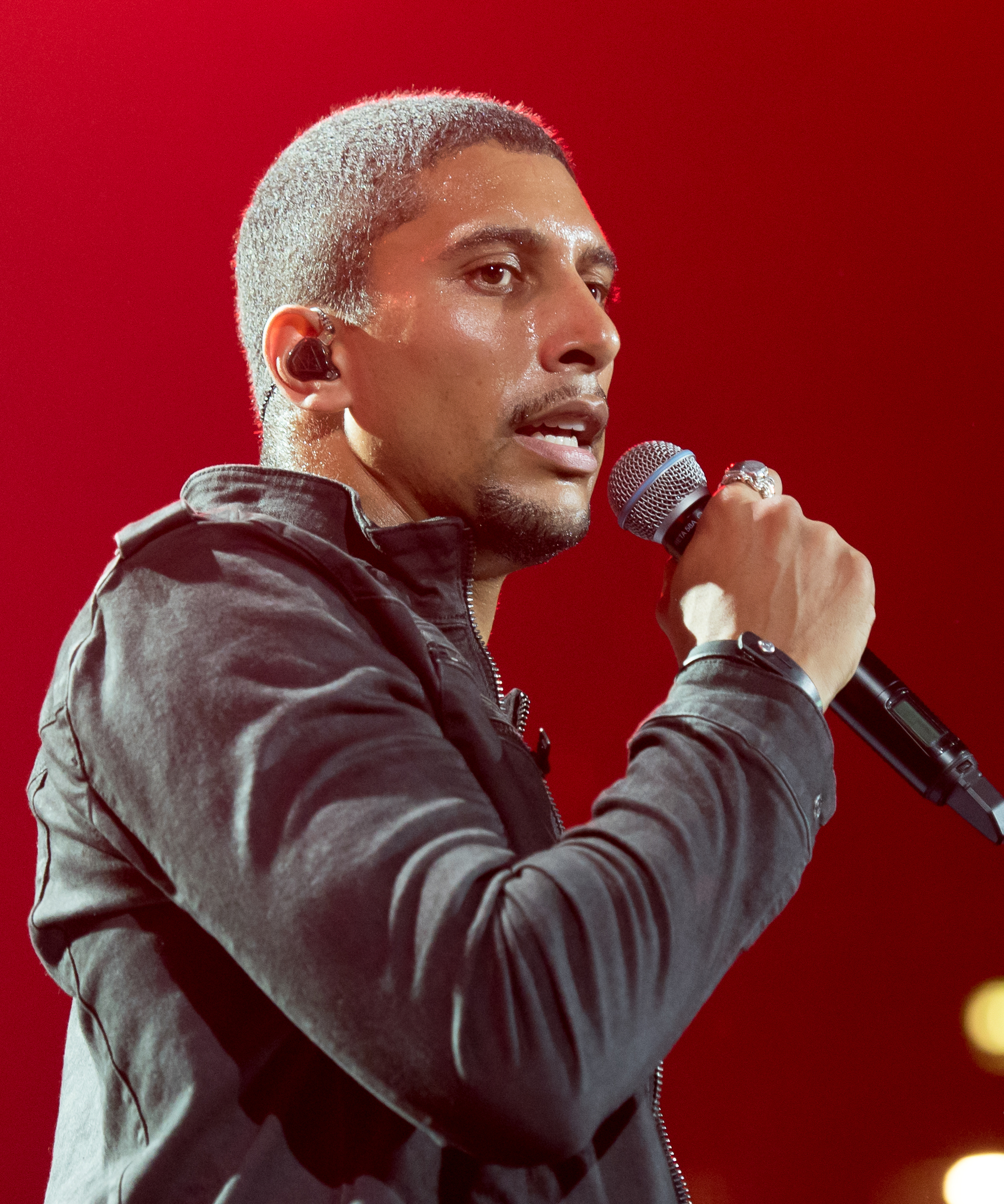
- Bourani at the Global Citizen Festival 2017

Background information
- Born: Andreas Stiegelmair; 2 November 1983 (age 42); Augsburg, West Germany
- Genres: Pop
- Occupations: Singer, songwriter
- Years active: 2011–present
- Label: Vertigo Berlin
- Website: bourani.de

Andreas Bourani (born Stiegelmair; 2 November 1983) is a German pop singer and songwriter.

== Career ==
Bourani was born to Egyptian parents and adopted as an infant by a German family in Augsburg, in the southwest of Bavaria. As a youth, he attended high school at St. Stephan but left without graduating and also studied at the private music school Downtown Music Institute. In 2008, he moved from Munich to Berlin. In 2010, he received a recording contract with Universal Music and performed as an opening act for Philipp Poisel and Culcha Candela on their 2010 arena tours.

In June 2011, Bourani released his debut album Staub & Fantasie. It reached number 23 on the German Albums Chart and spawned the hit single "Nur in meinem Kopf" which became a top 20 hit in Austria, Germany, and Switzerland. In Germany, the single was certified gold for sales of more than 150,000 copies. In September 2011, he represented Bavaria in the Bundesvision Song Contest with his second single "Eisberg". He finished tenth in the competition. He then toured with Unheilig and was featured in one of their charting hits "Wie wir waren".

In April 2013, he was nominated for the German Music Authors' Prize in the Best Pop Text category. Bourani's second studio album, Hey, was released in May 2014 and spawned the single "Auf uns" which topped the German and Austrian Singles Chart. The song was also used in the trailer for the film Die Mannschaft which documents the Germany National Football Team's win of the 2014 FIFA World Cup.

In May 2015, Bourani along with Xavier Naidoo, Yvonne Catterfeld and others appeared in the second season of Sing meinen Song - Das Tauschkonzert, the German The Best Singers adaption. The same month, it was announced that Bourani would replace Sunrise Avenue lead vocalist Samu Haber as a judge in the fifth season of The Voice of Germany. He is the official voice of Maui in the German dub of Moana.

== Discography ==
=== Studio albums ===
Title	Album details	Peak positions			Certifications
Title	Album details	GER	AUT	SWI	Certifications
Staub & Fantasie	Released: 10 June 2011; Label: Vertigo Berlin; Formats: CD, digital download	23	27	22	BVMI: Gold
Hey	Released: 9 May 2014; Label: Vertigo Berlin; Formats: CD, LP, digital download	3	3	3	BVMI: 7× Gold; IFPI AUT: 2× Platinum

=== Live albums ===
Title	Album details
Hey (Live)	Released: 30 October 2015; Label: Vertigo Berlin; Formats: CD, DVD, digital download

=== Singles ===
==== As lead artist ====
Title	Year	Peak positions			Certifications	Album
Title	Year	GER	AUT	SWI	Certifications	Album
"Nur in meinem Kopf"	2011	16	13	15	BVMI: Gold	Staub & Fantasie
"Eisberg"	2011	47	56	—		Staub & Fantasie
"Wunder"	2012	—	—	—		Staub & Fantasie
"Auf uns"	2014	1	1	2	BVMI: Diamond; IFPI AUT: Platinum; IFPI SWI: Platinum	Hey
"Auf anderen Wegen"	2014	4	5	29	BVMI: Platinum; IFPI AUT: Gold	Hey
"Ultraleicht"	2015	45	71	50	BVMI: Gold	Hey
"Hey"	2015	30	46	36		Hey
"—" denotes a recording that did not chart or was not released in that territory.

==== As featured artist ====
Title	Year	Peak positions			Certifications	Album
Title	Year	GER	AUT	SWI	Certifications	Album
"Wie wir waren" (Unheilig featuring Andreas Bourani)	2012	32	60	—		Lichter der Stadt
"Astronaut" (Sido featuring Andreas Bourani)	2015	1	1	1	BVMI: Platinum; IFPI SWI: Gold	VI
"Radio Song (MTV Unplugged 2)" (Udo Lindenberg featuring Andreas Bourani)	2019	—	—	—		MTV Unplugged 2: Live vom Atlantik
"Willkommen Zurück" (Clueso featuring Andreas Bourani)	2021	91	—	—		Album
"—" denotes a recording that did not chart or was not released in that territory.

=== Other charted songs ===
Title	Year	Peak positions	Album
Title	Year	GER	Album
"Schlaflied"	2015	48	Sing meinen Song – Das Tauschkonzert Vol. 2

== Filmography ==
- Vaiana – Das Paradies hat einen Haken – Maui (2016)
- Baymax – Riesiges Robowabohu – Fred (2014)
