= Hey (Andreas Bourani album) =

Studio album by Andreas Bourani
- Released: 9 May 2014
- Length: 50:23
- Label: Vertigo Berlin
- Producer: Andreas Bourani; Julius Hartog; Peter "Jem" Seifert; Philipp Steinke

Andreas Bourani chronology
| Staub & Fantasie (2011) | Hey (2014) | Hey (Live) (2015) |

Hey is the second studio album by German recording artist Andreas Bourani. Produced by Bourani along with Julius Hartog, Peter "Jem" Seifert, Philipp Steinke and several other musicians, it was released by Vertigo Berlin on 9 May 2014 in German-speaking Europe. Boosted by the number one success of its leading single "Auf uns," it reached the top ten of the German Albums Chart.

== Critical reception ==
Professional ratings
Review scores
| Source | Rating |
|---|---|
| laut.de | 2/5 stars |

In his review for laut.de, Manuel Berger rated the album two stars out of five. He wrote: "If you know one song, you know them all. Every track has the hooks that make it a long-running hit in the hit lists and can drive people crazy while shopping in the department store with what feels like ten listens per hour. And every track sinks into kitsch and triviality."

== Track listing ==
Hey track listing
| No. | Title | Writer(s) | Producer(s) | Length |
|---|---|---|---|---|
| 1. | "Refugium" | Andreas Bourani; Julius Hartog | Bourani; Hartog | 1:26 |
| 2. | "Wieder am Leben" | Bourani; Hartog; Mario Wesser; Tom Olbrich | Peter "Jem" Seifert | 3:44 |
| 3. | "Auf uns" | Bourani; Olbrich; Hartog | Seifert | 4:00 |
| 4. | "Alles beim Alten" | Bourani; Hartog; Jasmin Shakeri | Seifert | 4:35 |
| 5. | "Hey" | Bourani; Hartog; Shakeri; Philipp Steinke | Steinke | 4:34 |
| 6. | "Ultraleicht" | Bourani; Hartog; Shakeri | Seifert | 4:25 |
| 7. | "Nimm meine Hand" | Bourani; Hartog; Jen Bender; Raphael Schalz | Steinke | 4:23 |
| 8. | "Auf anderen Wegen" | Bourani; Hartog | Steinke | 4:28 |
| 9. | "Delirium" | Bourani; Hartog; Alexander Freund | Seifert | 4:20 |
| 10. | "Füreinander gemacht" | Bourani; Hartog; Freund | Seifert | 3:36 |
| 11. | "Ein Ende nach dem andern" | Bourani; Hartog; Tom Olbrich | Seifert | 3:15 |
| 12. | "Was tut dir gut" | Bourani; Hartog; Freund | Seifert | 5:16 |
| 13. | "Sein" | Bourani; Hartog; Shakeri | Seifert | 3:16 |
| Total length: | | | | 50:23 |

== Charts ==
=== Weekly charts ===
Weekly chart performance for Hey
| Chart (2014–15) | Peak position |
|---|---|
| Austrian Albums (Ö3 Austria) | 3 |
| German Albums (Offizielle Top 100) | 3 |
| Swiss Albums (Schweizer Hitparade) | 3 |

=== Year-end charts ===
Year-emd chart performance for Hey
| Chart (2014) | Position |
|---|---|
| German Albums (Offizielle Top 100) | 24 |

Year-emd chart performance for Hey
| Chart (2015) | Position |
|---|---|
| Austrian Albums (Ö3 Austria) | 10 |
| German Albums (Offizielle Top 100) | 8 |
| Swiss Albums (Schweizer Hitparade) | 13 |

Year-emd chart performance for Hey
| Chart (2016) | Position |
|---|---|
| German Albums (Offizielle Top 100) | 40 |
| Swiss Albums (Schweizer Hitparade) | 63 |

== Certifications ==
Certifications for Hey
| Region | Certification | Certified units/sales |
|---|---|---|
| Austria (IFPI Austria) | 2× Platinum | 30,000^{*} |
| Germany (BVMI) | 7× Gold | 700,000^{‡} |
^{*} Sales figures based on certification alone.^{‡} Sales+streaming figures based on certification alone.
