= Auf anderen Wegen =

Single by Andreas Bourani

from the album Hey
- Released: 23 October 2014
- Genre: Pop; pop rock
- Length: 4:01
- Label: Universal
- Songwriters: Andreas Bourani; Julius Hartog
- Producer: Philipp Steinke

Andreas Bourani singles chronology
"Auf uns" (2014)	"Auf anderen Wegen" (2014)	"Ultraleicht" (2015)

"Auf anderen Wegen" (German: On Other Trails) is a song by German recording artist Andreas Bourani. It was written by Bourani along with Julius Hartog for his second studio album Hey (2014), while production was helmed by Philipp Steinke.

== Formats and track listings ==
CD Single
No.	Title	Length
1.	"Auf anderen Wegen" (Radio version)	4:11
2.	"Auf anderen Wegen" (Album version)	4:29
3.	"Die Welt gehört dir"	3:39
4.	"Ultraleicht" (MTV Live Sessions Hamburg 2014)	5:22

== Charts ==
=== Weekly charts ===
Chart (2014)	Peak position
Austria (Ö3 Austria Top 40)	5
Germany (GfK)	4
Switzerland (Schweizer Hitparade)	29

=== Year-end charts ===
Chart (2014)	Position
Germany (Official German Charts)	56
Chart (2015)	Position
Austria (Ö3 Austria Top 40)	34
Germany (Official German Charts)	46
