= Ultraleicht (song) =

Single by Andreas Bourani

from the album Hey
- Released: 3 July 2015
- Genre: Pop; pop rock
- Length: 4:25
- Label: Universal
- Songwriters: Andreas Bourani; Julius Hartog; Jasmin Shakeri
- Producer: Peter "Jem" Seifert

Andreas Bourani singles chronology
| "Auf anderen Wegen" (2014) | "Ultraleicht" (2015) | "Hey" (2015) |

"Ultraleicht" (German: Ultralight) is a song by German recording artist Andreas Bourani. It was written by Bourani along with Julius Hartog and Jasmin Shakeri for his second album Hey (2014), while production was helmed by Peter "Jem" Seifert.

== Formats and track listings ==
CD single
| No. | Title | Length |
|---|---|---|
| 1. | "Ultraleicht" (radio edit) | 3:44 |
| 2. | "Ultraleicht" (Calyre & Kaind remix) | 4:01 |
| 3. | "Ultraleicht" (Shuko & Freedo remix) | 3:56 |
| 4. | "Ultraleicht" (Achtabahn remix) | 4:18 |

== Charts ==
=== Weekly charts ===
| Chart (2015) | Peak position |
|---|---|
| Austria (Ö3 Austria Top 40) | 71 |
| Germany (GfK) | 45 |
| Switzerland (Schweizer Hitparade) | 50 |
