= Eisberg (song) =

Single by Andreas Bourani

from the album Staub & Fantasie
- Released: 23 September 2011
- Genre: Pop; pop rock
- Length: 4:23
- Label: Universal
- Songwriters: Andreas Bourani; Tom Olbrich; Julius Hartog
- Producers: Andreas Herbig; Peter "Jem" Seifert

Andreas Bourani singles chronology
"Nur in meinem Kopf" (2011)	"Eisberg" (2011)	"Wunder" (2012)

"Eisberg" (German: Iceberg) is a song by German recording artist Andreas Bourani. It was written by Bourani along with Tom Olbrich and Julius Hartog for his debut album Staub & Fantasie (2011), while production was helmed by Andreas Herbig and Peter "Jem" Seifert. Released as the album's seconds single, the pop ballad was significantly less successful than its predecessor "Nur in meinem Kopf", reaching the top fifty on the German Singles Chart only.

== Formats and track listings ==
CD Single
No.	Title	Length
1.	"Eisberg" (single version)	3:55
2.	"Eisberg" (acoustic version)	4:21

== Charts ==
=== Weekly charts ===
Chart (2011)	Peak position
Austria (Ö3 Austria Top 40)	56
Germany (GfK)	47
