= Nur in meinem Kopf =

Single by Andreas Bourani

from the album Staub & Fantasie
- Released: 17 May 2011
- Genre: Pop; pop rock
- Length: 3:49
- Label: Universal
- Songwriters: Andreas Bourani; Tom Olbrich; Julius Hartog
- Producers: Andreas Herbig; Peter "Jem" Seifert

Andreas Bourani singles chronology
"Nur in meinem Kopf" (2011)	"Eisberg" (2011)

"Nur in meinem Kopf" (German: Only in My Mind) is a song by German recording artist Andreas Bourani. It was written by Bourani along with Tom Olbrich and Julius Hartog for his debut album Staub & Fantasie (2011), while production was helmed by Andreas Herbig and Peter "Jem" Seifert. Released as Bourani's first single in May 2011, the song became an instant commercial success, reaching the top 20 in Austria, Germany, and Switzerland.

== Formats and track listings ==
CD single
No.	Title	Length
1.	"Nur in meinem Kopf" (radio edit)	3:49
2.	"Nur in meinem Kopf" (acoustic version)	3:43

== Charts ==
=== Weekly charts ===
Chart (2011)	Peak position
Austria (Ö3 Austria Top 40)	13
Germany (GfK)	16
Switzerland (Schweizer Hitparade)	15

=== Year-end charts ===
Chart (2011)	Position
Germany (Official German Charts)	58
