= Auf uns =

Single by Andreas Bourani

from the album Hey
- Released: 25 April 2014
- Genre: Pop; pop rock
- Length: 4:01
- Label: Universal Music Group
- Songwriters: Andreas Bourani; Tom Olbrich; Julius Hartog
- Producer: Peter "Jem" Seifert

Andreas Bourani singles chronology
"Wie wir waren" (2012)	"Auf uns" (2014)	"Auf anderen Wegen" (2014)

"Auf uns" (German: To Us) is a song by German recording artist Andreas Bourani. It was written by Bourani along with Tom Olbrich and Julius Hartog for his second studio album Hey (2014), while production was helmed by Peter "Jem" Seifert. Released as the album's lead single in April 2014, the uptempo song marked Bourani's commercial breakthrough, when it reached the top of Austrian and German Singles Charts.

== Formats and track listings ==
CD Single
No.	Title	Length
1.	"Auf uns"	4:01
2.	"Auf uns" (Acoustic version)	4:24

== Charts ==
=== Weekly charts ===
Chart (2014)	Peak position
Austria (Ö3 Austria Top 40)	1
Germany (GfK)	1
Switzerland (Schweizer Hitparade)	2

=== Year-end charts ===
Chart (2014)	Position
Austria (Ö3 Austria Top 40)	9
Germany (Official German Charts)	4
Switzerland (Schweizer Hitparade)	28

Chart (2015)	Position
Austria (Ö3 Austria Top 40)	67
Germany (Official German Charts)	76

=== Decade-end charts ===
Chart (2010–2019)	Position
Germany (Official German Charts)	10

== Certifications ==
Region	Certification	Certified units/sales
Austria (IFPI Austria)	Platinum	30,000^{*}
Germany (BVMI)	Diamond	1,000,000^{‡}
Switzerland (IFPI Switzerland)	Platinum	30,000^{‡}
^{*} Sales figures based on certification alone.^{‡} Sales+streaming figures based on certification alone.
