= 2004 in German television =

This is a list of German television related events from 2004.

== Events ==
- 13 March - Elli Erl wins the second season of Deutschland sucht den Superstar. Her debut single, "This Is My Life" reaches number three in the Official German Charts in April 2004.
- 19 March - Max Mutzke is selected to represent Germany at the 2004 Eurovision Song Contest with his song "Can't Wait Until Tonight". He is selected to be the forty-ninth German Eurovision entry during Germany 12 Points! held at the Arena Berlin in Berlin.

== Debuts ==
=== Domestic ===
- 15 January - The Wishing Tree (2004) (ARD)
- 29 February - Dittsche (2004–present) (ARD)
- 11 October - Stromberg (2004–2012) (ProSieben)
- 5 November - Queen of Cherries (2004) (Arte)

=== International ===
- 2 October - (United States) The O.C. (2003–2007) (ORF 1)

=== BFBS ===
- (United States) Dora the Explorer (2000–2019)

== Television shows ==
=== 1950s ===
- Tagesschau (1952–present)

=== 1960s ===
- heute (1963-present)

=== 1970s ===
- heute-journal (1978-present)
- Tagesthemen (1978-present)

=== 1980s ===
- Wetten, dass..? (1981-2014)
- Lindenstraße (1985–present)

=== 1990s ===
- Gute Zeiten, schlechte Zeiten (1992–present)
- Marienhof (1992–2011)
- Unter uns (1994-present)
- Verbotene Liebe (1995-2015)
- Schloss Einstein (1998–present)
- In aller Freundschaft (1998–present)
- Wer wird Millionär? (1999-present)

=== 2000s ===
- Big Brother Germany (2000-2011, 2015)
- Deutschland sucht den Superstar (2002–present)

== Networks and services ==
=== Launches ===
Network	Type	Launch date	Notes	Source
RBB Fernsehen	Cable television	29 February		
Animal Planet	Cable television	31 March		
Hit24	Cable television	3 April		
Kinowelt TV	Cable television	12 May		
Terranova	Cable television	15 September		
AXN	Cable television	1 November		
Playhouse Disney	Cable television	10 November		
National Geographic	Cable television	11 November		
History Channel	Cable television	15 November		
Traumpartner TV	Cable television	1 December		

=== Conversions and rebrandings ===
Old network name	New network name	Type	Conversion Date	Notes	Source
hessen fernsehen	hr-fernsehen	Cable television	3 October		

=== Closures ===
Network	Type	End date	Notes	Sources
Onyx.tv	Cable television	15 September		

== See also ==
- 2004 in Germany
