= List of number-one hits of 2006 (Germany) =

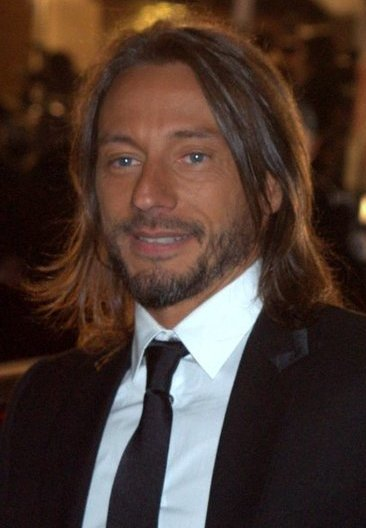
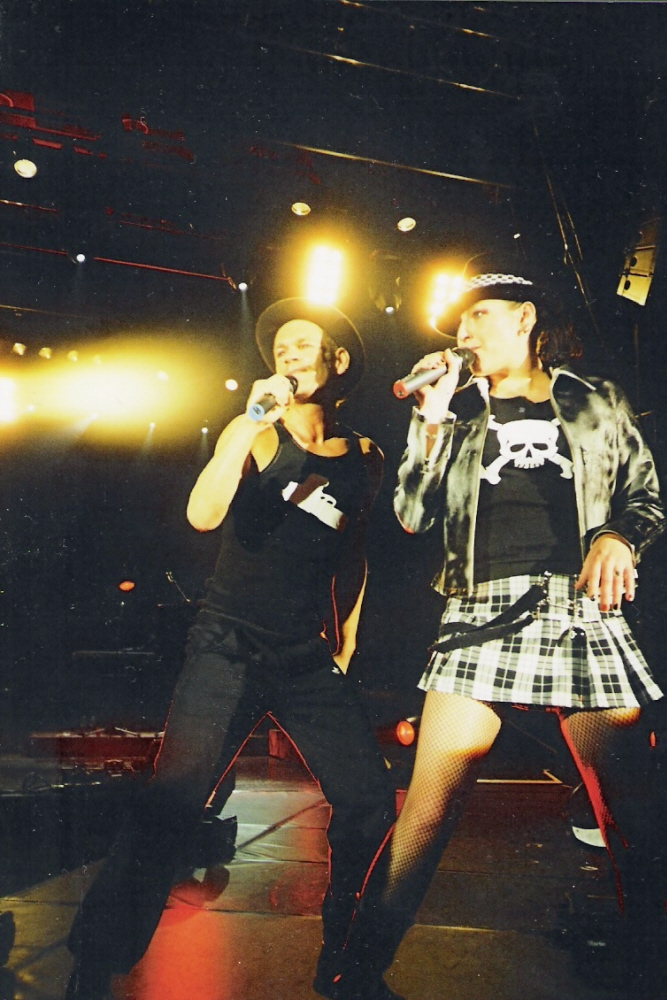
Bob Sinclar's "Love Generation" became the best-performing single of 2006, while Rosenstolz's "Das große Leben" became the best-performing album of the year.

This is a list of songs which reached number one on the German Media Control Top100 Singles Chart in 2006.

== Number-one hits by week ==
Key
†	Indicates best-performing single and album of 2006

Issue date	Song	Artist	Ref.	Album	Artist	Ref.
6 January	"Hung Up"	Madonna		Intensive Care	Robbie Williams	
13 January	"Hung Up"	Madonna		Telegramm für X	Xavier Naidoo	
20 January	"Big City Life"	Mattafix		Telegramm für X	Xavier Naidoo	
27 January	"Big City Life"	Mattafix		Telegramm für X	Xavier Naidoo	
3 February	"Big City Life"	Mattafix		Telegramm für X	Xavier Naidoo	
10 February	"I Belong to You (Il Ritmo Della Passione)"	Eros Ramazzotti and Anastacia		Back to Bedlam	James Blunt	
17 February	"Love Generation"†	Bob Sinclar presents Goleo VI featuring Gary "Nesta" Pine		Livealbum of Death	Farin Urlaub Racing Team	
24 February	"I Belong to You (Il Ritmo Della Passione)"	Eros Ramazzotti and Anastacia		Love Songs	Deutschland sucht den Superstar	
3 March	"Love Generation"†	Bob Sinclar presents Goleo VI featuring Gary "Nesta" Pine		Love Songs	Deutschland sucht den Superstar	
10 March	"Love Generation"†	Bob Sinclar presents Goleo VI featuring Gary "Nesta" Pine		Love Songs	Deutschland sucht den Superstar	
17 March	"Love Generation"†	Bob Sinclar presents Goleo VI featuring Gary "Nesta" Pine		Das große Leben†	Rosenstolz	
24 March	"Rette Mich"	Tokio Hotel		Das große Leben†	Rosenstolz	
31 March	"Love Generation"†	Bob Sinclar presents Goleo VI featuring Gary "Nesta" Pine		Das große Leben†	Rosenstolz	
7 April	"I Still Burn"	Tobias Regner		Das große Leben†	Rosenstolz	
14 April	"I Still Burn"	Tobias Regner		I'm Not Dead	Pink	
21 April	"I Still Burn"	Tobias Regner		Splitternackt	Andrea Berg	
28 April	"I Still Burn"	Tobias Regner		Schrei	Tokio Hotel	
5 May	"Don't Let It Get You Down"	Mike Leon Grosch		Laut Gedacht	Silbermond	
12 May	"No No Never"	Texas Lightning		Straight	Tobias Regner	
19 May	"Hips Don't Lie"	Shakira featuring Wyclef Jean		Stadium Arcadium	Red Hot Chili Peppers	
26 May	"No No Never"	Texas Lightning		Stadium Arcadium	Red Hot Chili Peppers	
2 June	"No No Never"	Texas Lightning		Stadium Arcadium	Red Hot Chili Peppers	
9 June	"Hips Don't Lie"	Shakira featuring Wyclef Jean		Stadium Arcadium	Red Hot Chili Peppers	
16 June	"Hips Don't Lie"	Shakira featuring Wyclef Jean		Stadium Arcadium	Red Hot Chili Peppers	
23 June	"Zeit, Dass Sich Was Dreht/Celebrate the Day"	Herbert Grönemeyer featuring Amadou & Mariam		Loose	Nelly Furtado	
30 June	"Zeit, Dass Sich Was Dreht/Celebrate the Day"	Herbert Grönemeyer featuring Amadou & Mariam		Loose	Nelly Furtado	
7 July	"'54, '74, '90, 2006"	Sportfreunde Stiller		Billy Talent II	Billy Talent	
14 July	"'54, '74, '90, 2006"	Sportfreunde Stiller		LaFee	LaFee	
21 July	"Zeit, Dass Sich Was Dreht/Celebrate the Day"	Herbert Grönemeyer featuring Amadou & Mariam		Pulse	Pink Floyd	
28 July	"'54, '74, '90, 2006"	Sportfreunde Stiller		Ich denk an dich	Semino Rossi	
4 August	"Danke"	Xavier Naidoo		Ich denk an dich	Semino Rossi	
11 August	"Danke"	Xavier Naidoo		Ich denk an dich	Semino Rossi	
18 August	"Danke"	Xavier Naidoo		Mercedes-Dance	Jan Delay	
25 August	"Danke"	Xavier Naidoo		Back to Basics	Christina Aguilera	
1 September	"Danke"	Xavier Naidoo		Loose	Nelly Furtado	
8 September	"Der letzte Tag"/"Wir Schließen Uns Ein"	Tokio Hotel		A Matter of Life and Death	Iron Maiden	
15 September	"Rudebox"	Robbie Williams		Es ist wie es ist	Pur	
22 September	"SexyBack"	Justin Timberlake		Das große Leben†	Rosenstolz	
29 September	"SexyBack"	Justin Timberlake		Lebe lauter	Christina Stürmer	
6 October	"SexyBack"	Justin Timberlake		Lebe lauter	Christina Stürmer	
13 October	"I Don't Feel Like Dancin'"	Scissor Sisters		The Open Door	Evanescence	
20 October	"Das Beste"	Silbermond		Bäst of	Die Ärzte	
27 October	"Das Beste"	Silbermond		Ein neuer Tag	Juli	
3 November	"Das Beste"	Silbermond		Rudebox	Robbie Williams	
10 November	"Das Beste"	Silbermond		Rudebox	Robbie Williams	
17 November	"Das Beste"	Silbermond		Rudebox	Robbie Williams	
24 November	"Das Beste"	Silbermond		The Best of Depeche Mode Volume 1	Depeche Mode	
1 December	"Patience"	Take That		Völkerball	Rammstein	
8 December	"Das Beste"	Silbermond		Völkerball	Rammstein	
15 December	"Shame"	Monrose		Völkerball	Rammstein	
22 December	"Shame"	Monrose		Temptation	Monrose	
29 December	"All Good Things (Come to an End)"	Nelly Furtado		Temptation	Monrose	

== See also ==
- List of number-one hits (Germany)
- List of German airplay number-one songs
