= Straight (album) =

Studio album by Tobias Regner
- Released: 28 April 2006
- Length: 48:12
- Label: 19; Sony BMG
- Producer: Brix; Ingo Politz; Bernd Wendlandt

Tobias Regner chronology
Straight (2006)	Kurz unsterblich (2010)

Shout It Out is the debut studio album by German recording artist Tobias Regner. It was released by Sony BMG in association with 19 Recordings on 28 April 2006, in German-speaking Europe, following his participation in the third season of Deutschland sucht den Superstar, which he won. The album debuted at number-one on the German Albums Chart and reached Gold status in Germany.

== Promotion ==
Straight produced three singles. Lead single, "I Still Burn," co-written by Jess Cates, achieved significant commercial impact, reaching number one in Germany, Austria, and Switzerland, becoming the first DSDS coronation song since first season winner Alexander Klaws's debut single "Take Me Tonight" (2003) to reach the top spot in alle three countries. The follow-up singles "She's So" and "Cool Without You" saw more modest chart performance, with "She's So" peaking at number 38 in Germany and "Cool Without You," the German theme for the American animated adventure comedy film Open Season, reaching number 46. The latter was later included on a reissue of Straight, released on 17 November 2006.

== Critical reception ==
Professional ratings
Review scores
Source	Rating
laut.de	3/5 stars

Writing for laut.de, Dani Fromm described the music on Straight as "straightforward, not particularly innovative, guitar-driven rock," noting that she was "surprised – and quite taken with it." She called Regner a "truly versatile, powerful-voiced and also extremely likeable singer," but criticized the lyrics as "terribly predictable" and warned against becoming a "German copy of Jon Bon Jovi." Jan Gebauer fron Queer.de described Straight as an album that sounds "loud, familiar and obtrusive," especially criticizing Regner's voice as overly loud, suggesting it compensates for a "lack of expression." Gebauer also questioned the lack of Regner's artistic input."

== Commercial performance ==
Straight was a commercial success in German-speaking Europe. It debuted at number one on the German Albums Chart, making it the first album by a Deutschland sucht den Superstar winner to top the German charts since Alexander Klaws's debut album Take Your Chance (2004), after the more modest commercial performance of second-season winner Elli Erl's album Shout It Out (2004). The album also peaked at number five in Austria and number fourteen in Switzerland. At year's end, Straight ranked number 59 on the German year-end chart for 2006. In Germany, it was certified Gold by the Bundesverband Musikindustrie (BVMI) for shipments of 100,000 units, further underscoring its solid commercial performance.

== Track listing ==
Straight track listing
No.	Title	Writer(s)	Length
1.	"She's So"	Andreas Carlsson; Marcus Englof; Samuel Waermö	3:11
2.	"I Still Burn"	Jess Cates; Peter Wright	3:37
3.	"My One Mistake"	Andy Love; Magnus Fridh; Pelle Nylén	3:59
4.	"Hologram"	Max Martin; Per Aldeheim; Tony Cornelissen	3:37
5.	"Homeless Heart"	Andreas Carlsson; Desmond Child; Harry Sommerdahl	3:02
6.	"Singular"	Tobias Regner	4:12
7.	"Someday"	Bernd Wendlandt; Ingo Politz; Mitch Kelly	4:17
8.	"I Know"	Bernd Wendlandt; Ingo Politz	3:32
9.	"All My Life"	Tobias Regner	2:55
10.	"Let It Die"	Bernd Wendlandt; Ingo Politz; Steve van Velvet; Jasmin Kaldirim	3:12
11.	"In Your Hands"	Douglas Shawe; Magnus Fridh; Pelle Nylén	4:22
12.	"Another Second Chance"	Brian John Howes; Dane Deviller; Sean Hosein	4:23

Bonus track
No.	Title	Writer(s)	Length
13.	"My First Time"	Regner	4:00
Total length:			48:12

Straight – Re-edition
No.	Title	Writer(s)	Length
13.	"My First Time"	Regner	4:00
14.	"I Still Burn" (Acoustic Version)	Cates; Wright	3:22
15.	"Cool Without You"	Nando Eweg; Cornelissen	3:22
16.	"Who Wants the World"	Simon Perry; David Thomas	3:52
17.	"Colour-blind"	Regner	3:47
18.	"Succeed" (Rehearsal Version Live)	Regner; Daniel Nitt; David Anlauff; Marc Awounou; Alex Grube; Walter Schneider	4:39

== Charts ==
=== Weekly charts ===
Weekly chart performance for Straight
Chart (2006)	Peak position
Austrian Albums (Ö3 Austria)	5
German Albums (Offizielle Top 100)	1
Swiss Albums (Schweizer Hitparade)	14

=== Year-end charts ===
Year-end chart performance for Straight
Chart (2006)	Position
German Albums (Offizielle Top 100)	59

== Certifications ==
Certifications for Straight
Region	Certification	Certified units/sales
Germany (BVMI)	Gold	100,000
^{^} Shipments figures based on certification alone.

== Release history ==
Straight release history
Region	Date	Edition(s)	Format(s)	Label(s)	Ref.
Various	28 April 2006	Standard	Digital download; CD	19; Sony BMG	
Various	17 November 2006	Re-edition	Digital download; CD	19; Sony BMG	
