= Sistanova =

German girl group

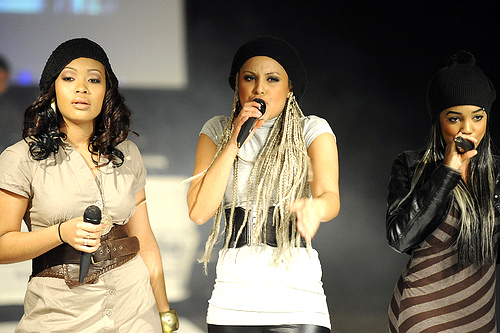

Background information
- Origin: Frankfurt am Main, Germany
- Genres: R&B, pop, hip hop
- Years active: 2005–2010
- Label: Warner Music Germany
- Past members: KeyLiza (Kisita Elizabeth Massamba); Rola (Rola Madirose Hinterbichler); Viviane (Viviane Meyer)

Sistanova were a German girl group from Frankfurt am Main, which was founded in 2005. They were the first girl group in Germany singing German language R&B music.

== History ==
KeyLiza was born on December 11, 1989, in Hanau and moved to Frankfurt am Main. Her parents are from Angola and Democratic Republic of the Congo. When she was five years old she made friends with Rola who was born on 12, February 1990 in Accra, capital of Ghana. Rolas mother is from Ghana, her father is Armenian from Lebanon. With three years she came to Frankfurt where she grew up with her mother and her stepfather who is from Bayern. KeyLiza and Rola began to dance together and sing and imitating their favorite bands and artists like the Spice Girls, TLC, Michael Jackson and Destiny's Child. As they always did everything together they sang in school events, attended dance classes, piano and theater groups, and wrote they first song at eleven years old. In 2004 they met Viviane. Vivianes Father is from Cameroon and her mother Indonesian of Chinese descent. She was born on 2, June 1989 in Bad Homburg and spent many years in Indonesia and Paris and returned to Germany.

The band performed at regional competitions and recorded demos under the name Black Supremes. In 2005 the production team Noizemakers and Christopher Applegate took the Black Supremes under the new name Sistanova under contract. In 2006, the band was signed to the record company Warner Music Germany.

On 21 September 2007, their first single 'Was ist los?'(What's going on?) was released, produced by Thomas Troelsen which debuted at #76 in the German Singles Chart and at #24 in the German Urban Charts. In November 2007 Sistanova entered as the opening act of the US singer Rihanna at four concerts. In addition, they still supported the band as the opening act for Hip Hop group Rapsoul throughout Germany and Austria.

On 5 December 2008, their debut album was released Unglaublich.

In 2010, the band broke up. According to their MySpace page all the band members will go on a solo career.

== Discography ==
=== Singles ===
Year	Single	Peak positions	Album
Year	Single	German Singles Chart	Album
2007	"Was Ist Los"	76	Unglaublich
2007	"Was Ist Los (Remix)"	24	Unglaublich

=== Studio albums ===
- Unglaublich
- Was Ist Los - EP

=== Promotional singles ===
- Unglaublich
- Leben
- Sexy Girl
- Ziele with Thomas Anders of Modern Talking HelleWecks Soundtrack
- Mama
- Unsere Stadt
- Es Ist Vorbei

== Tours ==
Opening act

Rihanna - Good Girl Gone Bad Tour

- November 13, 2007 - in Munich - Zenith
- November 20, 2007 - in Cologne - Palladium
- November 23, 2007 - in Frankfurt - Jahrhunderthalle
- November 26, 2007 - in Berlin - Columbiahalle

Opening act

- Rapsoul - Achterbahn Tour
- NRJ Music Tour

== See also ==
- KeyLiza
- Good Girl Gone Bad Tour
- Thomas Anders
