= KeyLiza =

German musician

Keyliza
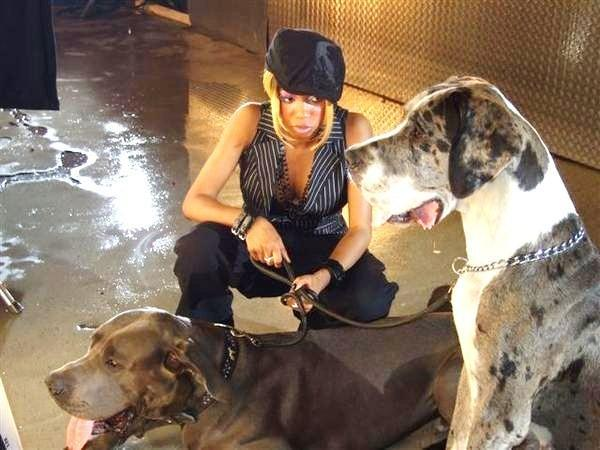
- KeyLiza in 2007

Background information
- Also known as: DJ Queen of Beats, Queen of Beats, Q.O.B.
- Born: Kisita Elisabeth Massamba; December 11, 1989 (age 36)
- Origin: Frankfurt am Main, Germany
- Genres: Hip hop; R&B; dancehall; Afro-Cuban; EDM; world; theme music; film music
- Occupations: Singer, dancer, composer, beatmaker, DJ, record producer, creative director
- Instruments: Vocals, keytar, keyboards, synthesizer, talkbox, beatboxing, guitar
- Years active: 2005–present
- Label: Warner Music

Kisita Elisabeth Massamba (born December 11, 1989), known by her stage name Keyliza, DJ Queen of Beats or Q.O.B., is a German singer, dancer, DJ, composer, beatmaker and record producer based in Vancouver, Canada. She is best known for being a member of German R&B-pop group Sistanova.

== Early life ==
Massamba was born on December 11, 1990, in Hanau, Germany. Both of her parents are from Angola and the Democratic Republic of Congo. Her mother was born in São Salvador, northern Angola (present day M'banza-Kongo) and she is a part of the Kingdom of Kongo. At the age of four she moved with her family to Frankfurt am Main. In 2001 she started getting piano, singing, jazz dancing & theater lessons at school & gospel choir and also started beatboxing in the school recess and malls where she discovered her passion to create music instrumentals Hip Hop Beats. She get her first attention to hip hop music and rap when she listens to Tupac Shakur, Bone Thugs N Harmony and Orishas. Since the age of 14 she creates and compose songs, instrumentals, soundtracks and theme music and which explains her other Pseudonym DJ Queen of Beats.

== Musical career ==
=== 2004–07: Warner Music and touring ===
Kisita knows one band-mate since childhood and they were close friends. In a school club they sang, took jazz dance lessons and composed their own music. In 2004, they met the third member and created the group Black Supremes. The band went on to regional competitions and recorded demos. In 2005 they met the production team Noizemakers, which took the Black Supremes under the new name Sistanova under contract. In 2006, the band was signed to Warner Music Group. On September 21, 2007, they released their first single "Was ist los?" a dance-R&B song produced by Thomas Troelsen which entered the German Singles Chart at No. 76 and German Urban Charts at No. 24. The video premiere was on VIVA Germany and MTV Germany. In November 2007 they were the opening act for Barbadian recording artist Rihanna for her European Good Girl Gone Bad Tour in (Munich/Zenith, Cologne/Palladium, Frankfurt/Jahrhunderthalle, Berlin/Columbiahalle) Germany. At the same time, they were on tour with the group Rapsoul throughout Germany and Austria. Kisita and her bandmates join the NRJ Music Tour in Stuttgart with Craig David, Monrose, Culcha Candela & The Boss Hoss and they performed in front of over 8.500 People.

=== 2008–10: Warner Music, album release ===
In 2008 they wrote and composed the ballad "Mama" for the Mother's Day, to which a video was shot and they were invited on RTL Television with their Moms to perform an A cappella of the song. They also composed and sang the soundtrack song "Ziele" for the children's book The HelleWecks with Thomas Anders from the popular pop-duo Modern Talking. In Spring 2008 Kisita and her bandmates composed songs for their debut album and worked with several producers like Noizmakers Entertainment (Rick Damm & Ralph Diehl), Chris Applegate (Jennifer Rush), Andreas Herbig (Culcha Candela), Thomas Troelsen (Pitbull, Jennifer Lopez), Marcus Brosch (Brandy, Nick Carter, Enrique Iglesias) and Michelle Leonard. During the recordings of the debut album they performed with four-time Breakdance World Champions Flying Steps at the Tuning World Messe Bodensee and present their second single "Sexy Girl". they also got a contract for the German Playboy Magazine to promote their second single "Sexy Girl". But family members didn't agree with that and the contract with Playboy was cancelled.

On December 8, 2008, they released their debut album "Unglaublich". In 2010 they were in the German Cinema Movie Homies (HipHop Express) with actor & singer Jimi Blue Ochsenknecht which was released in August 2011. According to their MySpace page, all band members will go on a solo career.

=== 2018–present ===
In 2011 Kisita also known as DJ Queen of Beats was composing and producing jingles, songs and beats for artists, radio shows & TV. She also created in 2015 her company called 'Global MIC. Entertainment' for TV, films, commercials, music composition, musical films, dance and Live music. In 2016 she launched the media platform Nostalgic Express.

=== 2020–present ===
She's currently working on new music as a solo artist under Q.O.B. an abbreviation for Queen of Beats.

== Artistry ==
=== Influences ===
Since a child she grew up with Afropop, Cuban son, Reggae, Jazz, Afro-Cuban jazz, Rock and Pop music.

Her father invited in the 1990s Congolese rumba musicians like Bozi Boziana, Zaiko Langa Langa and Pepe Kalle to play concerts in Frankfurt am Main. She learned her first dance choreography at the age of 6 with the song Thriller by Michael Jackson. In her teens she was inspired by Spice Girls and TLC and performed at school festivals & school clubs their songs.

Her dance style includes Hip Hop, Salsa, Street Jazz and Popping.

Michael Jackson, Tina Turner, Celia Cruz, Nina Simone, Jimi Hendrix, Charlie Chaplin and Mozart are her inspirations. She is also inspired by Martial Arts, Vaudeville, Theater and Bollywood Musicals.

== Discography ==
As part of Sistanova

=== Singles ===
Year	Single	Peak positions	Album
Year	Single	German Singles Chart	Album
2007	"Was Ist Los"	76	Unglaublich
2007	"Was Ist Los (Remix)"	24	Unglaublich

=== Studio albums ===
- Unglaublich (2008)

EPs

- Was Ist Los – EP (2007)

== Tours ==
Opening act

Rihanna – Good Girl Gone Bad Tour

- November 13, 2007 – in Munich – Zenith
- November 20, 2007 – in Cologne – Palladium
- November 23, 2007 – in Frankfurt – Jahrhunderthalle
- November 26, 2007 – in Berlin – Columbiahalle

Opening act

- Rapsoul – Achterbahn Tour
- NRJ Music Tour

== See also ==
- Sistanova
