= Dominik Glöbl =

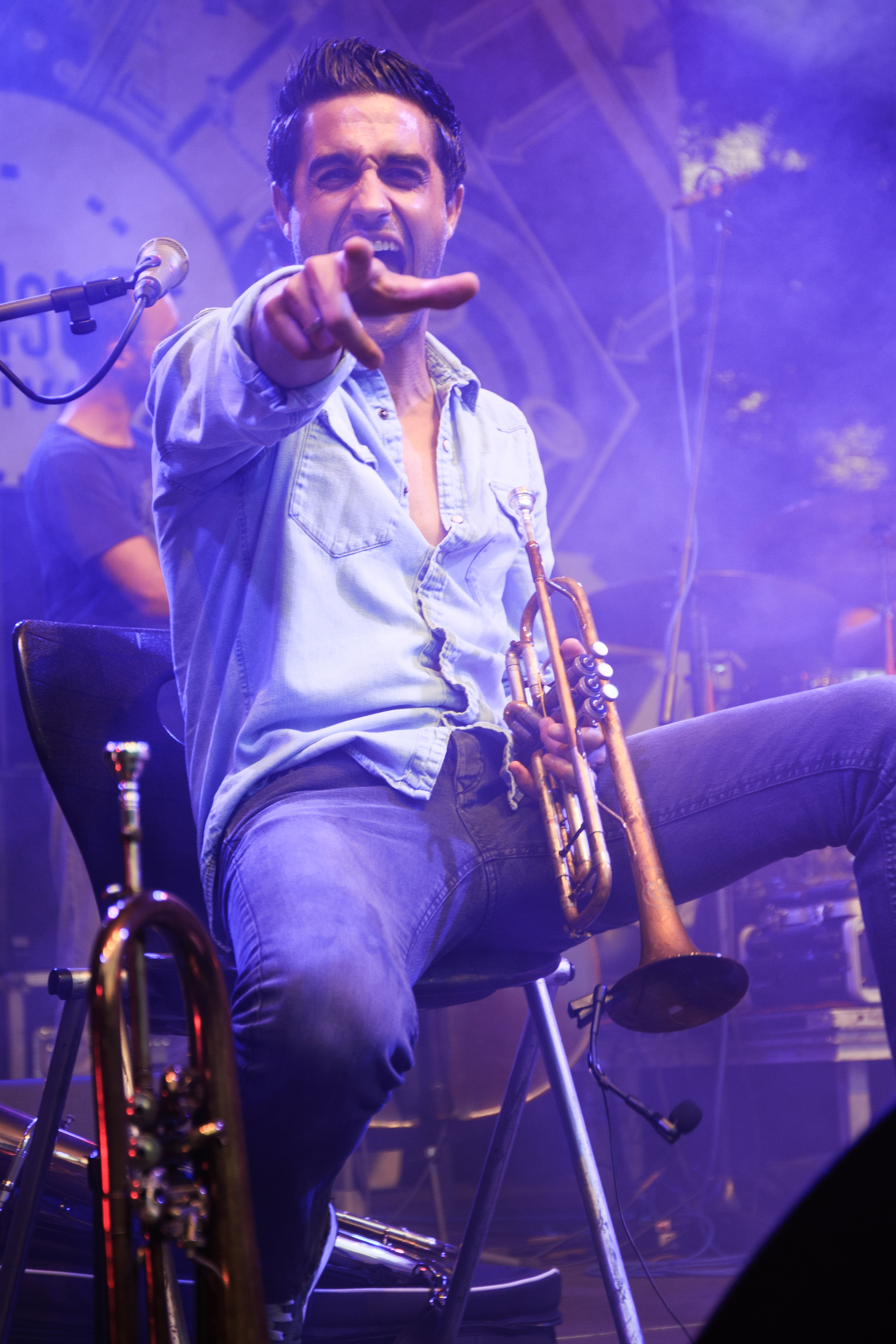

Background information
- Born: 25 May 1984 (age 42)
- Instrument: trumpet

Dominik Glöbl is a German trumpeter, singer, and television presenter.

== Career ==
Dominik Glöbl was raised by a musical family who allowed him to receive training. His musical education began at the Anton-Bruckner-Gymnasium Straubing, where he received trumpet lessons from the 8th grade. In 2003, together with school friends, he founded the group The Bavarian Lions with whom he played until 2019 and also plays for The Heimatdamisch.

In 2005, Glöbl began studying jazz trumpet at the University of Music and Drama in Munich, graduating in 2009. He supplemented his studies with lessons from Axel Schlosser and Christoph Well and participated in workshops with Rüdiger Baldauf, Randy Brecker, Andy Haderer, Ingrid Jensen, James Morrison, and Bobby Shew.

Glöbl played lead and solo trumpet in the Bavarian State Youth Jazz Orchestra from 2003 to 2008 and performed with many professional jazz musicians. He has toured with various bands that took him to Russia, Canada, Singapore, America, Iceland, Ukraine, and other countries. In 2008 and 2009 Glöbl was a member of the European Bigband Academy under the direction of Peter Herbolzheimer, with whom he gave concerts in Germany and abroad.

In addition to his concert career, he is dedicated to the training of young musicians and has been a trumpet teacher at the musical Von-Müller-Gymnasium Regensburg since September 2010 and at the music grammar school of the Regensburger Domspatzen since 2012. Glöbl regularly tours with his band Dreiviertelblut. Since 2017 he has presented the popular music show Wirtshausmusikanten at Hirzinger on Bavarian television.
