= Denmon =

Denmon is a surname. Notable people with the surname include:

- Marcus Denmon (born 1990), American professional basketball player
- Noa Denmon (born 1995 or 1996), American illustrator

== See also ==
- Dedmon
