= You Have to Win Zweikampf =

You have to win Zweikampf

Studio album by Sportfreunde Stiller
- Released: May 19, 2006
- Genre: German rock, indie
- Length: 41:05
- Label: Universal

Sportfreunde Stiller chronology
| Live (2004) | You have to win Zweikampf (2006) | La Bum (2007) |

You have to win Zweikampf is the fourth studio album released by the German rock band Sportfreunde Stiller. It was released on May 19, 2006, only a few weeks before the opening of the 2006 FIFA World Cup that was being hosted in Germany. The album is a concept album focused around Association football. Football has featured prominently in the band previous releases (cf. "10:1" on So wie einst Real Madrid), but this was their first album with solely football-related tracks.

While Herbert Grönemeyer's "Zeit, dass sich was dreht" was the official World Cup theme song, the single "'54, '74, '90, 2006" became a fan hymn for the German World Cup squad and was a number one hit in Germany. The song commemorates German championships in the 1954, 1974, and 1990 World Cups. After Germany lost in the semi-final against Italy on July 4, 2006, the song was reworked as "'54, '74, '90, 2010" in anticipation of the 2010 FIFA World Cup in South Africa.

The title quotes Bixente Lizarazu.

== Chart performance ==
The album spent fifteen weeks on the German charts, peaking at second place, where it spent three weeks. The song "'54, '74, '90, 2006" was released as a single, where it was a number-one hit for three weeks, and spent 37 weeks on the "Top 100 Singles" chart.

== Track listing ==
1. Unser Freund ist aus Leder ("Our Friend is Made of Leather")
2. Pogo in Togo
3. '54, '74, '90, 2006
4. Eine Liebe, die nie endet ("A Love that Never Ends")
5. Nix geht mehr ("Nothing Works Anymore")
6. Budenzauber ("Jamboree")
7. Die Frisur von Björn Borg ("Björn Borg's haircut")
8. Dem Fritz sein Wetter ("Fritz Walter's Weather")
9. Come Sara? ("How Will It Be?")
10. Mag Tischtennis! ("We Like Table Tennis!")
11. All die Schlachten, die wir schlagen ("All the Battles that We Fight")
