= Daniel Muñoz =

Daniel Muñoz may refer to:

- Daniel Muñoz (actor) (born 1966), Chilean actor
- Daniel Muñoz (footballer) (born 1996), Colombian footballer
- Daniel Muñoz (cyclist) (born 1996), Colombian cyclist
- Daniel Muñoz de la Nava (born 1982), Spanish tennis player
- Daniel Muñoz (singer), contestant on Deutschland sucht den Superstar
- Daniel Muñoz (archer) (born 1989), Colombian compound archer
