= Dedmon =

Dedmon is a surname. Notable people with the surname include:

- DeVonte Dedmon
- Dewayne Dedmon (born 1989), American basketball player
- Donald Dedmon (1931–1998), American university president
- Jeff Dedmon (born 1960), American baseball player
- Vanessa Jean Dedmon (born 1987), German singer
