= I Still Burn =

Single by Tobias Regner

from the album Straight
- Released: 24 March 2006
- Length: 3:37
- Label: 19; Sony BMG
- Songwriters: Jess Cates; Peter Wright
- Producers: Brix; Ingo Politz; Bernd Wendlandt

Tobias Regner singles chronology
"I Still Burn" (2006)	"She's So" (2006)

"I Still Burn" is a song by German recording artist Tobias Regner, the winner of the third season of the reality television talent show Deutschland sucht den Superstar, broadcast in 2006. It was written by Jess Cates and Peter Wright and produced by Brix Ingo Politz, and Bernd Wendlandt, marking the first time, a DSDS coronation song was not produced by judge Dieter Bohlen.

== Commercial performance ==
Released as Regner's debut single on 24 March 2006 in German-speaking Europe, it became the biggest-selling single in two years to debut at the charts, where it reached number one in Austria, Germany, and Switzerland, making him the first DSDS winner to top the charts in all three regions. "I Still Burn" was eventually certified gold by the Bundesverband Musikindustrie (BVMI) and became Germany's 13th best-selling single of 2006. It was later included on Regner's debut album Straight (2006).

== Track listings ==
CD Single
No.	Title	Length
1.	"I Still Burn" (radio version)	3:38
2.	"I Still Burn" (acoustic version)	3:22
3.	"I Still Burn" (alternative rock mix)	3:38
4.	"I Still Burn" (orchestra version)	3:38

== Credits and personnel ==
Credits are taken from Straight liner notes.

- Arrangement – Rainer Oleak
- Backing vocals – Mitch Kelly
- Bass – Ingo York
- Drums – Ingo Politz
- Guitar – Uwe Hassbecker
- Piano – Oliver Rivo
- Producer – Bernd Wendlandt, Brix, Ingo Politz
- Vocal coach – Jeff Cascaro
- Writing – Jess Cates, Peter Wright

== Charts ==
=== Weekly charts ===
Weekly chart performance for "I Still Burn"
Chart (2006)	Peak position
Austria (Ö3 Austria Top 40)	1
Germany (GfK)	1
Switzerland (Schweizer Hitparade)	1

=== Year-end charts ===
Year-end chart performance for "I Still Burn"
Chart (2006)	Position
Austria (Ö3 Austria Top 40)	22
Germany (GfK)	13
Switzerland (Schweizer Hitparade)	21

== Certifications ==
Certifications for "I Still Burn"
Region	Certification	Certified units/sales
Germany (BVMI)	Gold	150,000^{^}
^{^} Shipments figures based on certification alone.
