= Shout It Out (Elli Erl album) =

Studio album by Elli Erl
- Released: October 4, 2004
- Recorded: 2004
- Genre: Pop rock
- Label: 19; Hansa; BMG
- Producer: Dieter Bohlen; Frabo

Elli Erl chronology
Shout It Out (2004)	Moving On (2007)

Shout It Out is the debut studio album by German recording artist Elli Erl. It was released by BMG in association with 19 Recordings and Hansa Records on October 4, 2004 in German-speaking Europe, following her participation in the second season of Deutschland sucht den Superstar, which she won.

== Background ==
While she was offered to record a full album with DSDS judge and producer Dieter Bohlen, Erl declined in favor of different collaborators, citing his pop sound and lyrical approach. Instead, musician Frabo was consulted to work on the majority of pop rock–driven Shout It Out, along with songwriters Rea Garvey, Guy Chambers, and Erl herself.

== Critical reception ==
Professional ratings
Review scores
Source	Rating
laut.de	2/5 stars

Writing for laut.de, Alexander Cordas described Elli as an artist whose "metier is sophisticated rock" and emphasized her strong vocal performance and independence from typical casting-show production choices. While he noted an "overly polished sound" and only "solid average" songs on Shout It Out, he concluded that the album was nonetheless a musically convincing debut. Jan Gebauer fron Queer.de felt that Shout It Out showcases a more independent artistic direction with contributions from several notable writers and producers. He praised her powerful, expressive voice."

== Commercial performance ==
A moderate commercial success, Shout It Out debuted and peaked at number 33 on the German Albums Chart but failed to chart in Austria and Switzerland. The alnum was preceded by the top ten single "This Is My Life" and produced two further singles, including the top forty entry "In My Dream." However, lackluster sales resulted into the termination of Erl's recording contract in 2005. As of 2018, Shout It Out remains the lowest-peaking debut album by any DSDS winner.

== Track listing ==
Credits adapted from the liner notes of Shout It Out.

Shout It Out track listing
No.	Title	Writer(s)	Producer(s)	Length
1.	"Ready Steady Go"	Rea Garvey	Frabo	3:18
2.	"Not My Type"	Guy Chambers; Michelle Escoffery	Frabo	3:34
3.	"I Surrender"	Tommy La Verdi; Daniel Pandher; Jon Rydningen	Frabo	3:43
4.	"This Is My Life"	Dieter Bohlen	Bohlen	3:42
5.	"Shout It Out"	Benito Battiston; Katie Freudenschuss; Philipp Grüll	Frabo	3:04
6.	"In My Dream"	Philipp Grüll; Katharina „Nina“ Wächter; Elli Erl	Frabo	3:42
7.	"All Things"	Erl	Frabo	4:42
8.	"Leavin’"	Grüll; Wächter; Katharina Wendt	Frabo	3:42
9.	"Close to Me"	Grüll; Wächter; Florian Zrenner; Andreas Schechinger; Erl	Frabo	3:08
10.	"Slippin’ Away"	Grüll; Wächter	Frabo	4:02
11.	"Shine"	Grüll; Wächter; Schechinger; Erl	Frabo	0:35
12.	"Strong Enough"	Svein Finneide; Ken Ingwersen; Rydningen	Frabo	4:03

== Charts ==
Weekly chart performance for Shout It Out
Chart (2004)	Peak position
German Albums (Offizielle Top 100)	33
