= Vanessa Jean Dedmon =

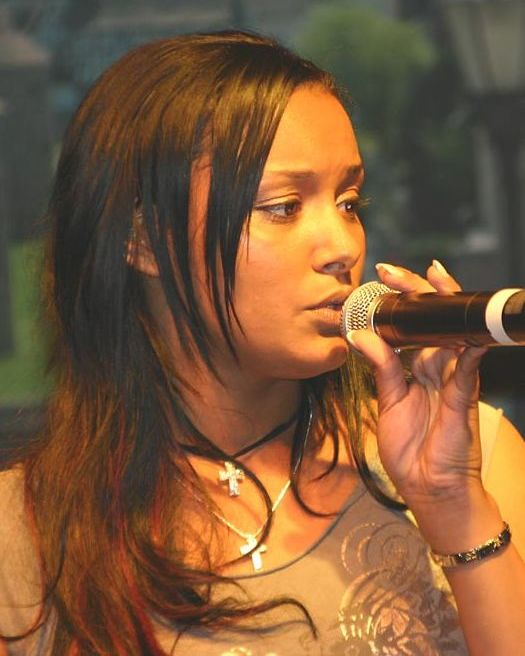
- Dedmon performing in 2007

Background information
- Born: 28 April 1987 (age 38); Braunfels, West Germany
- Occupation: Singer
- Years active: 2005–present

Vanessa Jean Dedmon (born 28 April 1987) is a German singer, best known as a semifinalist on Germany's third season of Deutschland sucht den Superstar (the German version of Pop Idol), being voted out by the audience in the Top 3 Show. She was one of the favorites of the jury.

Dedmon was born in Braunfels, West Germany, to Russell and Waltraud Dedmon. She has two older siblings, a brother named Delanzo and a sister named Latascha. Vanessa and Latascha live with their parents in Germany while Delanzo is stationed in Texas as a member of the United States Army. As of March 2006, she was going out with former co-competitor Mike Leon Grosch. However, as of June 2006, they have broken up.

In October 2006, Dedmon first single, "Sonnenschein", a duet with German hip hop group Rapsoul, entered the German single charts at number 17.

== Deutschland sucht den Superstar performances ==
- Top 20 Show: "There You'll Be" (Faith Hill)
- Top 14 Show: "Living to Love You" (Sarah Connor)
- Top 10 Show: "Run to You" (Whitney Houston)
- Top 9 Show: "Time After Time" (Cyndi Lauper)
- Top 8 Show: "Knockin' on Heaven's Door" (Bob Dylan)
- Top 7 Show: "Somewhere Over the Rainbow" (Judy Garland)
- Top 6 Show: "Hero" (Mariah Carey)
- Top 5 Show: "I Wanna Dance with Somebody" (Whitney Houston) / Without You (Mariah Carey)
- Top 4 Show: "Get Here" (Oleta Adams) / "Fallin'" (Alicia Keys)
- Top 3 Show: "The Greatest Love of All" (Whitney Houston) / "I Turn to You" (Christina Aguilera) / "Für dich" (Yvonne Catterfeld)

== Discography ==
=== Singles ===
- 2006: Sonnenschein (duet with Rapsoul)

=== Album appearances ===
- Absolute (Mike Leon Grosch):
  - "We've Got Tonight" (Mike Leon Grosch & Vanessa Jean Dedmon) (2006)
- Unbeschreiblich (Rapsoul):
  - "Sonnenschein" (Rapsoul feat. Vanessa Jean Dedmon) (2006)
- Love Songs (DSDS-finalists compilation album):
  - "Hero"
  - "2 Become 1" (Vanessa Jean Dedmon, Anna-Maria Zimmerman, Lena Hanenberg, Carolina Escolano & Dana Semcova)
