= Deutschland sucht den Superstar season 2 =

Season of television series

Deutschland sucht den Superstar
- Season 2
- Hosted by: Michelle Hunziker & Carsten Spengemann
- Judges: Dieter Bohlen; Thomas Bug; Shona Fraser; Thomas Stein
- Winner: Elli Erl
- Runner-up: Denise Tillmanns

Release
- Original network: RTL
- Original release: 3 September 2003 – 13 March 2004

Season chronology
- ← Previous; Season 1 Next → Season 3

The second season of Deutschland sucht den Superstar premiered in September 2003 and continued until 13 March 2004. It was won by Elli Erl. The season was co-hosted by Michelle Hunziker and Carsten Spengemann.

== Finals ==
=== Finalists ===
(Ages stated at time of contest)

Contestant	Age	Hometown	Voted off	Liveshow theme
Elli Erl	24	Straubing	Winner	Grand Finale
Denise Tillmanns	19	Geilenkirchen	8 March 2004	Grand Finale
Philippe Bühler	22	Friedrichshafen	21 February 2004	The 60s
Benjamin Martell	23	Duisburg	14 February 2004	Judges' Choice
Gunther Göbbel	24	Nuremberg	7 February 2004	Movies
Anke Wagner	28	Trier	31 January 2004	The 70s
Aida Ilijasevic	27	Münster	17 January 2004	Big Band
Judith Burmeister	17	Berlin	10 January 2004	Elton John & Madonna
Kemi Awosogba	20	Gronau	20 December 2003	Christmas Songs
Lorenzo Woodard	19	Ravensgiersburg	13 December 2003	My Birth Year
Steffen Frommberger	21	Schonstedt	29 November 2003	Rock and Pop Ballads
Jessica Houston	19	Karlsruhe	22 November 2003	My Superstar
Ricky Ord	24	Detmold	22 November 2003	My Superstar

=== Live show details ===
==== Heat 1 (8 October 2003) ====
Order	Artist	Song (original artists)	Result
1	John Patrick	"I'll Make Love to You" (Boyz II Men)	Eliminated
2	Marc	"All or Nothing" (O-Town)	Eliminated
3	Sabine	"Time After Time" (Cyndi Lauper)	Eliminated
4	Denise Tillmanns	"There You'll Be" (Faith Hill)	Advanced
5	Mine	"Ain't No Sunshine" (Bill Withers)	Eliminated
6	Sascha Schmitz	"If I Never Knew You" (Jon Secada & Shanice)	Eliminated
7	Michael Löw	"Forever Love" (Gary Barlow)	Eliminated
8	Kristina Dörfer	"Beautiful" (Christina Aguilera)	Eliminated
9	Philippe Bühler	"I'll Be There" (The Jackson 5)	Eliminated
10	Jessica Houston	"Because You Loved Me" (Celine Dion)	Advanced

Notes

- Jessica Houston and Denise Tillmanns advanced to the top 13 of the competition. The other 8 contestants were eliminated.
- Michael and Philippe returned for a second chance at the top 13 in the Wildcard Round.

==== Heat 2 (15 October 2003) ====
Order	Artist	Song (original artists)	Result
1	Bendix Amonat	"Don't Let the Sun Go Down on Me" (Elton John)	Eliminated
2	Veronika S.	"My All" (Mariah Carey)	Eliminated
3	Dennis W.	"All Out of Love" (Air Supply)	Eliminated
4	Khanh Nguyen	"You've Got a Friend" (Carole King)	Eliminated
5	Judith Burmeister	"I Will Always Love You" (Whitney Houston)	Advanced
6	Jenny Gerdts	"I'm Like a Bird" (Nelly Furtado)	Eliminated
7	Stefan Neubacher	"Your Song" (Elton John)	Eliminated
8	Ricky Ord	"Hello" (Lionel Richie)	Advanced
9	Jenny Adler	"Rise" (Gabrielle)	Eliminated
10	Roger Moore	"Heaven" (Bryan Adams)	Eliminated

Notes

- Judith Burmeister and Ricky Ord advanced to the top 13 of the competition. The other 8 contestants were eliminated.
- Bendix, Stefan, Jenny A. and Roger returned for a second chance at the top 13 in the Wildcard Round.

==== Heat 3 (22 October 2003) ====
Order	Artist	Song (original artists)	Result
1	Meik Schröder	"Always" (Bon Jovi)	Eliminated
2	Jeanna Marie Lalić	"The Greatest Love of All" (Whitney Houston)	Eliminated
3	Elke Mühlberger	"It Must Have Been Love" (Roxette)	Eliminated
4	Gunther Göbbel	"Can't Help Falling in Love" (Elvis Presley)	Eliminated
5	Andreas H.	"Eternity" (Robbie Williams)	Eliminated
6	Kaya Laß	"What's Up" (4 Non Blondes)	Eliminated
7	Benjamin Martell	"Now and Forever" (Richard Marx)	Advanced
8	Kemi Awosogba	"You Might Need Somebody" (Shola Ama)	Advanced
9	Stefanie N.	"Fallin'" (Alicia Keys)	Eliminated
10	Martin B.	"If Tomorrow Never Comes" (Ronan Keating)	Eliminated

Notes

- Yvonne Catterfeld stood in for Michelle Hunziker as co-host on this episode.
- Benjamin Martell and Kemi Awosogba advanced to the top 13 of the competition. The other 8 contestants were eliminated.
- Gunther returned for a second chance at the top 13 in the Wildcard Round.

==== Heat 4 (29 October 2003) ====
Order	Artist	Song (original artists)	Result
1	Thomas M.	"Right Here Waiting" (Richard Marx)	Eliminated
2	Desmond P.	"I Believe I Can Fly" (R. Kelly)	Eliminated
3	Constanze Beßing	"The Power of Love" (Jennifer Rush)	Eliminated
4	Sarah C.	"Shackles (Praise You)" (Mary Mary)	Eliminated
5	Steffen Frommberger	"She's Like the Wind" (Patrick Swayze)	Advanced
6	Miriam S.	"Save the Best for Last" (Vanessa Williams)	Eliminated
7	Eni Aksoy	"Run to You" (Whitney Houston)	Eliminated
8	Helmut Orosz	"Sorry Seems to Be the Hardest Word" (Elton John)	Eliminated
9	Roger Sery	"Easy" (Commodores)	Eliminated
10	Aida Ilijasevic	"Show Me Heaven" (Maria McKee)	Advanced

Notes

- Aida Ilijasevic and Steffen Frommberger advanced to the top 13 of the competition. The other 8 contestants were eliminated.
- Constanze and Eni returned for a second chance at the top 13 in the Wildcard Round.

==== Heat 5 (5 November 2003) ====
Order	Artist	Song (original artists)	Result
1	Christian Petru	"Let Me Fall" ()	Eliminated
2	Djamila D.	"My Heart Will Go On" (Celine Dion)	Eliminated
3	Anke Wagner	"How Do I Live" (LeAnn Rimes)	Eliminated
4	Marlene B.	"I'll Stand By You" (The Pretenders)	Eliminated
5	Bernd O.	"Words" (Bee Gees)	Eliminated
6	Elli Erl	"Let It Rain" (Amanda Marshall)	Advanced
7	Manuel D.	"Without You" (Harry Nilsson)	Eliminated
8	Annette H.	"Torn" (Natalie Imbruglia)	Eliminated
9	Patrick G.	"If You Don't Know Me By Now" (Simply Red)	Eliminated
10	Lorenzo Woodard	"U Got It Bad" (Usher)	Advanced

Notes

- Elli Erl and Lorenzo Woodard advanced to the top 13 of the competition. The other 8 contestants were eliminated.
- Anke returned for a second chance at the top 13 in the Wildcard Round.

==== Wildcard round (12 November 2003) ====
Order	Artist	Song (original artists)	Result
1	Roger Moore	"Drowning" (Backstreet Boys)	Eliminated
2	Jenny Adler	"All Around the World" (Lisa Stansfield)	Eliminated
3	Eni Aksoy	"Hard to Say I'm Sorry" (Chicago)	Eliminated
4	Gunther Göbbel	"End of the Road" (Boyz II Men)	Advanced
5	Constanze Beßing	"I'm Not a Girl, Not Yet a Woman" (Britney Spears)	Eliminated
6	Bendix Amonat	"Freedom! '90" (George Michael)	Eliminated
7	Michael Löw	"You" (Ten Sharp)	Eliminated
8	Anke Wagner	"Get Here" (Oleta Adams)	Advanced
9	Stefan Neubacher	"Rooftop" (Sasha)	Eliminated
10	Philippe Bühler	"Señorita" (Justin Timberlake)	Advanced

Notes

- The judges selected Gunther Göbbel and Anke Wagner to move on into the Top 13 of the competition. Philippe Bühler received most votes, and completed the top 13.

==== Live Show 1 (22 November 2003) ====
Theme: My Superstar

Order	Artist	Song (original artists)	Result
1	Kemi Awosogba	"A Woman's Worth" (Alicia Keys)	Safe
2	Gunther Göbbel	"Quit Playing Games (With My Heart)" (Backstreet Boys)	Safe
3	Elli Erl	"Like the Way I Do" (Melissa Etheridge)	Safe
4	Denise Tillmanns	"Forever and for Always" (Shania Twain)	Safe
5	Benjamin Martell	"Against All Odds (Take a Look at Me Now)" (Phil Collins)	Safe
6	Jessica Houston	"Together Again" (Janet Jackson)	Eliminated
7	Steffen Frommberger	"I Just Called to Say I Love You" (Stevie Wonder)	Bottom three
8	Anke Wagner	"Ironic" (Alanis Morissette)	Safe
9	Ricky Ord	"Feel" (Robbie Williams)	Eliminated
10	Judith Burmeister	"Think Twice" (Celine Dion)	Bottom four
11	Philippe Bühler	"Cosmic Girl" (Jamiroquai)	Safe
12	Aida Ilijasevic	"You Keep Me Hangin' On" (The Supremes)	Safe
13	Lorenzo Woodard	"(I Can't Get No) Satisfaction" (The Rolling Stones)	Safe

==== Live Show 2 (29 November 2003) ====
Theme: Rock and Pop Ballads

Order	Artist	Song (original artists)	Result
1	Benjamin Martell	"Angels" (Robbie Williams)	Safe
2	Elli Erl	"I'm with You" (Avril Lavigne)	Safe
3	Judith Burmeister	"Für dich" (Yvonne Catterfeld)	Safe
4	Steffen Frommberger	"Wherever You Will Go" (The Calling)	Eliminated
5	Kemi Awosogba	"Nothing Compares 2 U" (Sinéad O'Connor)	Bottom two
6	Aida Ilijasevic	"Don't Speak" (No Doubt)	Safe
7	Lorenzo Woodard	"I Belong to You" (Lenny Kravitz)	Bottom three
8	Denise Tillmanns	"What's Love Got to Do with It" (Tina Turner)	Safe
9	Gunther Göbbel	"Careless Whisper" (George Michael)	Safe
10	Anke Wagner	"I Turn to You" (Christina Aguilera)	Safe
11	Philippe Bühler	"You Are Not Alone" (Michael Jackson)	Safe

==== Live Show 3 (13 December 2003) ====
Theme: My Birth Year

Order	Artist	Song (original artists)	Result
1	Elli Erl	"Hot Stuff" (Donna Summer)	Safe
2	Lorenzo Woodard	"Karma Chameleon" (Culture Club)	Eliminated
3	Judith Burmeister	"Take My Breath Away" (Berlin)	Bottom three
4	Kemi Awosogba	"I Love Rock 'n' Roll" (Joan Jett)	Bottom two
5	Benjamin Martell	"Sexy Eyes" (Dr. Hook)	Safe
6	Aida Ilijasevic	"All by Myself" (Celine Dion)	Safe
7	Anke Wagner	"You Light Up My Life" (Whitney Houston)	Safe
8	Philippe Bühler	"Tainted Love" (Soft Cell)	Safe
9	Denise Tillmanns	"Self Control" (Laura Branigan)	Safe
10	Gunther Göbbel	"Don't Stop 'til You Get Enough" (Michael Jackson)	Safe

==== Live Show 4 (20 December 2003) ====
Theme: Christmas Songs

Order	Artist	Song (original artists)	Result
1	Benjamin Martell	"Last Christmas" (Wham!)	Bottom two
2	Aida Ilijasevic	"Wonderful Dream (Holidays Are Coming)" (Melanie Thornton)	Safe
3	Anke Wagner	"White Christmas" (Bing Crosby)	Safe
4	Gunther Göbbel	"Santa Claus Is Coming to Town" (Various artists)	Safe
5	Elli Erl	"Happy Xmas (War Is Over)" (John Lennon)	Safe
6	Kemi Awosogba	"Silent Night" (Various artists)	Eliminated
7	Denise Tillmanns	"Rockin' Around the Christmas Tree" (Brenda Lee)	Safe
8	Judith Burmeister	"Rudolph the Red-Nosed Reindeer" (Gene Autry)	Bottom three
9	Philippe Bühler	"Winter Wonderland" (Tony Bennett)	Safe

==== Live Show 5 (10 January 2004) ====
Theme: Elton John & Madonna

Order	Artist	Song (original artists)	Result
1	Elli Erl	"American Pie" (Madonna)	Bottom three
2	Gunther Göbbel	"Candle in the Wind" (Elton John)	Bottom two
3	Judith Burmeister	"Material Girl" (Madonna)	Eliminated
4	Benjamin Martell	"Can You Feel the Love Tonight" (Elton John)	Safe
5	Denise Tillmanns	"The Power of Goodbye" (Madonna)	Safe
6	Aida Ilijasevic	"Express Yourself" (Madonna)	Safe
7	Philippe Bühler	"I'm Still Standing" (Elton John)	Safe
8	Anke Wagner	"Open Your Heart" (Madonna)	Safe

==== Live Show 6 (17 January 2004) ====
Theme: Big Band

Order	Artist	Song (original artists)	Result
1	Gunther Göbbel	"Ain't That a Kick in the Head" (Dean Martin)	Bottom two
2	Elli Erl	"It's Not Unusual" (Tom Jones)	Safe
3	Anke Wagner	"You Are the Sunshine of My Life" (Stevie Wonder)	Safe
4	Aida Ilijasevic	"Cheek to Cheek" (Fred Astaire)	Eliminated
5	Philippe Bühler	"For Once in My Life" (Frank Sinatra)	Safe
6	Denise Tillmanns	"Hit the Road Jack" (Ray Charles)	Safe
7	Benjamin Martell	"New York, New York" (Frank Sinatra)	Bottom three

==== Live Show 7 (31 January 2004) ====
Theme: The 70s

Order	Artist	Song (original artists)	Result
1	Benjamin Martell	"Mandy" (Barry Manilow)	Safe
2	Anke Wagner	"Don't Leave Me This Way" (Thelma Houston)	Eliminated
3	Elli Erl	"When I Need You" (Leo Sayer)	Bottom three
4	Gunther Göbbel	"You to Me Are Everything" (The Real Thing)	Bottom two
5	Denise Tillmanns	"I Will Survive" (Gloria Gaynor)	Safe
6	Philippe Bühler	"September" (Earth, Wind & Fire)	Safe

==== Live Show 8 (7 February 2004) ====
Theme: Movies

Order	Artist	Song (original artists)	Result
1	Denise Tillmanns	"(Everything I Do) I Do It for You" (Bryan Adams)	Safe
2	Gunther Göbbel	"When You Say Nothing at All" (Ronan Keating)	Eliminated
3	Philippe Bühler	"Sie sieht mich nicht" (Xavier Naidoo)	Safe
4	Elli Erl	"I Don't Want to Miss a Thing" (Aerosmith)	Bottom two
5	Benjamin Martell	"You'll Be in My Heart" (Phil Collins)	Bottom three

==== Live Show 9 (14 February 2004) ====
Theme: Judge's Choice

Order	Artist	First song (original artists)	Second song	Result
1	Benjamin Martell	"Relight My Fire" (Dan Hartman)	"Love Is All Around" (Wet Wet Wet)	Eliminated
2	Elli Erl	"Bette Davis Eyes" (Kim Carnes)	"Trouble" (Pink)	Bottom two
3	Philippe Bühler	"Walking Away" (Craig David)	"Maria Maria" (Santana)	Safe
4	Denise Tillmanns	"Can't Fight the Moonlight" (LeAnn Rimes)	"The Power of Love" (Jennifer Rush)	Safe

==== Live Show 10: Semi-final (21 February 2004) ====
Theme: The 60s

Order	Artist	First song (original artists)	Second song	Result
1	Elli Erl	"Son of a Preacher Man" (Dusty Springfield)	"Dream a Little Dream of Me" (Mama Cass)	Safe
2	Philippe Bühler	"A Whiter Shade of Pale" (Procol Harum)	"Respect" (Otis Redding)	Eliminated
3	Denise Tillmanns	"Downtown" (Petula Clark)	"Stop! In the Name of Love" (The Supremes)	Safe

==== Live final (13 March 2004) ====
Order	Artist	First song (original artists)	Second song	Third song	Result
1	Denise Tillmanns	"I Will Survive"	"(You Make Me Feel Like) A Natural Woman"	"This Is My Life"	Runner-up
2	Elli Erl	"Like the Way I Do"	"Out of Reach"	"This Is My Life"	Winner

== Releases ==
DSDS Finalists

- Albums: Magic of Music (2003)
- Singles: "Believe in Miracles", "Don't Call It Love" (promotional)

Elli Erl

- Albums: Shout It Out (2004)
- Singles: "This is My Life", "In My Dream", "Not My Type", "Get Up", "Better Than the Rest"

Phillipe Bühler

- Singles: "Warum", "Ich kann dich lieben"

Benjamin Martell

- Singles: "1st Fan Edition"

Gunther Göbbel

- Singles: "Meant 2 Be", "Stand by Me", "Only You", "Girl You Know It's True", "Right Here Waiting for You"

Anke Wagner

- Albums: Close to Me (2005)
- Singles: "Cool Days, Cool Nights"

== Elimination chart ==
Legend
Did not perform	Female	Male	Top 50	Top 13	Winner

Safe	Safe First	Safe Last	Eliminated	Wild Card	Did not perform

Stage:		Semi					Wild; Card	Finals										
Week:		10/8	10/15	10/22	10/29	11/5	11/12	11/22	11/29	12/13	12/20	1/10	1/17	1/31	2/7	2/14	2/21	3/13
Place	Contestant	Result																
1	Elli Erl					1st		4th	6th	4th	4th	6th	3rd	4th	4th	3rd	1st	Winner
2	Denise Tillmanns	2nd						3rd	2nd	1st	2nd	1st	1st	2nd	2nd	1st	2nd	Runner-Up
3	Philippe Bühler	Elim					1st	1st	1st	2nd	1st	3rd	2nd	1st	1st	2nd	Elim	
4	Benjamin Martell			1st				9th	5th	6th	8th	2nd	5th	3rd	3rd	Elim		
5	Gunther Göbbel			Elim			JC	6th	4th	5th	6th	7th	6th	5th	Elim			
6	Anke Wagner					Elim	JC	2nd	3rd	3rd	3rd	5th	4th	Elim				
7	Aida Ilijasevic				1st			8th	7th	7th	5th	4th	Elim					
8	Judith Burmeister		1st					10th	8th	8th	7th	Elim						
9	Kemi Awosogba			2nd				7th	10th	9th	Elim							
10	Lorenzo Woodard					2nd		5th	9th	Elim								
11	Steffen Frommenberger				2nd			11th	Elim									
12	Jessica Houston	1st						Elim										
13	Ricky Ord		2nd					Elim										
Wild; Card	Bendix Amonat		Elim				Elim											
Wild; Card	Constanze Beßing				Elim		Elim											
Wild; Card	Eni Aksoy				Elim		Elim											
Wild; Card	Jenny Adler		Elim				Elim											
Wild; Card	Michael Löw	Elim					Elim											
Wild; Card	Roger Moore		Elim				Elim											
Wild; Card	Stefan Neubacher		Elim				Elim											
Semi- Final 5	Annette H					Elim												
Semi- Final 5	Bernd O					Elim												
Semi- Final 5	Christian Petru					Elim												
Semi- Final 5	Djamila D					Elim												
Semi- Final 5	Manuel D					Elim												
Semi- Final 5	Marlene P					Elim												
Semi- Final 5	Patrick G					Elim												
Semi- Final 4	Desmond P				Elim													
Semi- Final 4	Helmut Orosz				Elim													
Semi- Final 4	Miriam S				Elim													
Semi- Final 4	Roger Sery				Elim													
Semi- Final 4	Sarah C				Elim													
Semi- Final 4	Thomas M				Elim													
Semi- Final 3	Andreas H			Elim														
Semi- Final 3	Elke Mühlberger			Elim														
Semi- Final 3	Jeanne-Marie Lalić			Elim														
Semi- Final 3	Kaya Laß			Elim														
Semi- Final 3	Martin B			Elim														
Semi- Final 3	Meik Schröder			Elim														
Semi- Final 3	Stefanie N			Elim														
Semi- Final 2	Dennis W		Elim															
Semi- Final 2	Jenny Gerdts		Elim															
Semi- Final 2	Khanh Nguyen		Elim															
Semi- Final 2	Veronika S		Elim															
Semi- Final 1	John Patrick	Elim																
Semi- Final 1	Kristina Dörfer	Elim																
Semi- Final 1	Marc	Elim																
Semi- Final 1	Mine	Elim																
Semi- Final 1	Sabine	Elim																
Semi- Final 1	Sascha Schmitz	Elim																

== Voting results ==
	Mottoshow 1 Mein Pop-Idol	Mottoshow 2 Die schönsten Rock- und Popballaden	Mottoshow 3 Mein Geburtsjahr	Mottoshow 4 Christmas	Mottoshow 5 Elton John meets Madonna	Mottoshow 6 Big Band	Mottoshow 7 Die 70er	Mottoshow 8 Filmmusik	Mottoshow 9 Songs der Jury	Mottoshow 10 Die 60er Jahre	Mottoshow 11 Finale: Wahllied; Staffel-Highlight; Siegertitel
1st	Philippe; 17,60 %	Philippe; 26,53 %	Denise; 26,15 %	Philippe; 25,52 %	Denise; 20,41 %	Denise; 30,28 %	Philippe; 25,09 %	Philippe; 28,28 %	Denise; 34,21 %	Elli; 38,17 %	Elli; 61,00 %
2nd	Anke; 16,49 %	Denise; 15,34 %	Philippe; 16,27 %	Denise; 19,56 %	Benjamin; 19,89 %	Philippe; 22,32 %	Denise; 21,29 %	Denise; 21,70 %	Philippe; 31,25 %	Denise; 32,71 %	Denise; 39,00 %
3rd	Denise; 12,82 %	Anke; 13,72 %	Anke; 15,29 %	Anke; 12,67 %	Philippe; 18,83 %	Elli; 10,84 %	Benjamin; 20,57 %	Benjamin; 20,14 %	Elli; 17,63 %	Philippe; 29,12 %	
4th	Elli; 8,96 %	Gunther; 12,38 %	Elli; 8,50 %	Elli; 11,28 %	Aida; 10,43 %	Anke; 10,58 %	Elli; 15,50 %	Elli; 17,30 %	Benjamin; 16,91 %		
5th	Lorenzo; 8,21 %	Benjamin; 8,09 %	Gunther; 8,03 %	Aida; 7,01 %	Anke; 9,60 %	Benjamin; 10,50 %	Gunther; 9,18 %	Gunther; 12,58 %			
6th	Gunther; 7,42 %	Elli; 4,74 %	Benjamin; 6,09 %	Gunther; 7,01 %	Elli; 7,68 %	Gunther; 7,77 %	Anke; 8,37 %				
7th	Kemi; 5,42 %	Aida; 4,53 %	Aida; 5,67 %	Judith; 6,73 %	Gunther; 7,19 %	Aida; 7,71 %					
8th	Aida; 5,35 %	Judith; 4,39 %	Judith; 4,90 %	Benjamin; 6,67 %	Judith; 5,97 %						
9th	Benjamin; 5,10 %	Lorenzo; 4,06 %	Kemi; 4,76 %	Kemi; 3,54 %							
10th	Judith; 4,95 %	Kemi; 3,77 %	Lorenzo; 4,34 %								
11th	Steffen; 2,66 %	Steffen; 2,46 %									
12th	Jessica; 2,50 %										
13th	Ricky; 2,47 %										

Preceded by Season 1 (2002/03)	Deutschland sucht den Superstar; Season 2 (2003/04)	Succeeded by Season 3 (2005/06)
