= Denise Tillmanns =

German singer

Denise Tillmanns (born 25 August 1984) is a German singer. She was the runner-up on the second season of Deutschland sucht den Superstar. She joined the top thirteen on 8 October 2003, being one of the first two members of the final group. On 13 March 2003 she lost in the final night to Elli Erl.

== Biography ==
Tillmanns grew up in Immendorf with her parents, Erika and Edmund, and brother, Kevin. She married Thomas Aymanns in 2008, a bank clerk. The couple have two daughters, Nina and Lara.

Tillmans guest-starred in the television series Unter Uns, toured with Tom Gäbel, and performed in the musical Fantastics.

== DSDS performances ==
1. Top 50 (group 1): "There You'll Be" (Faith Hill)
2. Top 13: "Forever and for Always" (Shania Twain)
3. Top 11: "What's Love Got to Do with It" (Tina Turner)
4. Top 10: "Self Control" (Laura Branigan)
5. Top 9: "Rockin' Around the Christmas Tree" (Brenda Lee)
6. Top 8: "The Power of Goodbye" (Madonna)
7. Top 7: "Hit the Road Jack" (Ray Charles)
8. Top 6: "I Will Survive" (Gloria Gaynor)
9. Top 5: "(Everything I Do) I Do It for You" (Bryan Adams)
10. Top 4: "Can't Fight the Moonlight" (LeAnn Rimes)
11. Top 4: "The Power of Love" (Jennifer Rush)
12. Top 3: "Downtown" (Petula Clark)
13. Top 3: "Stop! In the Name of Love" (The Supremes)
14. Top 2: "I Will Survive" (Gloria Gaynor)
15. Top 2: "Natural Woman" (Aretha Franklin)
16. Top 2: "This Is My Life" (winning song)- Runner-up
17. DSDS 2 Celebration live: duet with (Aida Iljasevic) — "Tell Him" (Barbra Streisand)
