= Anton-Bruckner-Gymnasium Straubing =

Location
- Straubing; Germany
- Coordinates: 48°52′22.33″N 12°33′47.27″E

Information
- Established: 1 November 1824; 201 years ago as Lehrerseminar im Jesuitenkolleg
- Principal: Rudolf Reinhardt
- Gender: Co-educational
- Enrollment: 990 (September 2011)

Anton-Bruckner-Gymnasium Straubing is the largest of four gymnasiums of Straubing in Bavaria by the number of students, the others being Johannes-Turmair-Gymnasium, Ludwigsgymnasium and Gymnasium der Ursulinen-Schulstiftung. It consists of a music and an economics branch.

== History ==
The school was established in 1824 as a teachers' training college. It was founded by Royal Decree of 4 September 1823 at the Jesuit College Straubinger on 1 November 1824, and expanded in 1833 by the construction of a residential building. In 1843, it moved to the former canon St. Jakob in Seminargasse.

In 1924, the college was declared a college of further education. In 1935, it was changed into the Deutsche Aufbauschule Straubing with 240 students. In 1953, it became a teacher training college again whilst retaining its secondary school activities. In 1956, the teacher training was relocated to Regensburg. In 1961, a new school building was opened.

In 1965, its name was changed to Anton-Bruckner-Gymnasium and the music branch was established. In 1976, the economics branch was added.

== Notable alumni ==
- Elli Erl, singer
- Gerold Huber, pianist
- Siegfried Mauser, pianist
- Kurt Raab, actor
- Peer Raben, composer
- Markus Weinzierl, football coach and former player
