= Sportfreunde Stiller =

German indie rock band

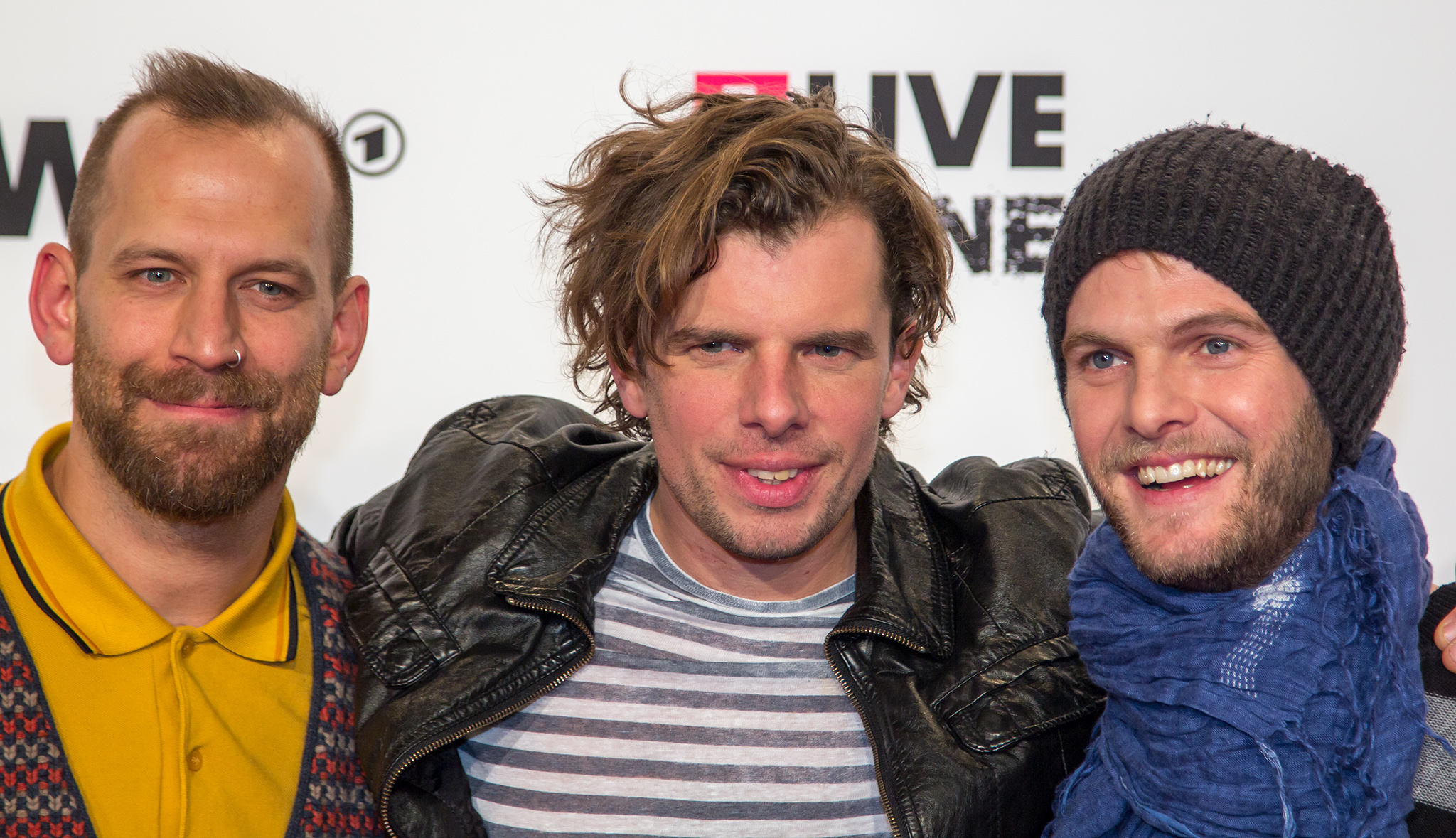
- Sportfreunde Stiller in 2013

Background information
- Origin: Germering, Germany
- Genres: Indie rock, alternative rock
- Years active: 1995–present
- Members: Peter Brugger; Florian "Flo" Weber; Rüdiger "Rüde" Linhof
- Past members: Andi Erhard
- Website: www.sportfreunde-stiller.de

Sportfreunde Stiller (German pronunciation: [ˈʃpɔʁtfʁɔʏndə ˈʃtɪlɐ]) is a German indie rock band from Germering near Munich, Bavaria.

== History ==
The band was founded by Peter Brugger (guitar, vocals), Florian "Flo" Weber (drums), and Andi Erhard (bass). They initially wanted to name themselves "Bodden" (after soccer player Olaf Bodden), before later settling for "Stiller". They took the name from their former soccer manager at SV Germering, Hans Stiller.

As Stiller, the band played their first concerts in 1995. They later changed their name because a different band called Stiller owned the rights to this name. The term Sportfreunde literally translates to friends in sports and is also used in names of sports clubs (e.g. Sportfreunde Siegen). In 1997, bassist Erhard was replaced by Rüdiger "Rüde" Linhof, whom they met at The Atomic Café, where Peter and Flo worked as barkeepers. The band's debut album, So wie einst Real Madrid, was released in 2000.

Sportfreunde Stiller's track "Independent" from Die gute Seite was featured in the video game FIFA 2003.

In 2006, the band wrote "'54, '74, '90, 2006", a fan hymn for the German World Cup squad which became a number one hit in Germany; the song commemorates West German championships in the 1954, 1974, and 1990 World Cups. After Germany lost in the semi-final against Italy on 4 July 2006, the song was reworked as "'54, '74, '90, 2010" in anticipation of the 2010 FIFA World Cup in South Africa.

Sportfreunde Stiller were nominated five times for Best German Act at the MTV Europe Music Awards, in 2002, 2004, 2006, 2007 and 2009.

Their album La Bum was released on 3 August 2007 (and reached the number 1 spot in Germany) with their single "Alles Roger" debuting on 20 July 2007 (reaching number 22 in Germany). The album title is an anagram of "album". The band was also nominated once again for the 2007 MTV Europe Music Awards award for German Act of the year.

The entire La Bum album (bonus track edition) was added to the American iTunes Store in early 2008.

The song "'54, '74, '90, 2010" is featured as a downloadable track in the video game Guitar Hero World Tour.

In 2009, Sportfreunde Stiller was the sixth German band to record an album for the MTV Unplugged series. The album includes adaptations of old songs, covered songs and new songs alike. Although titled MTV Unplugged in New York, the album was actually recorded during a concert at Bavaria Film Studios, Munich.

In 2012, Sportfreunde Stiller announced they would be trying out new songs live at festivals that summer, suggesting there may be a new studio album in the works. This album, titled New York, Rio, Rosenheim, was eventually released in May 2013.

In 2016, their single "Das Geschenk" debuted at number 1 in Austria, and also reached number 15 in Germany and number 58 in Switzerland.

In 2020, Florian Weber announced, in an interview with Donaukurier, that after a long break the band were working on a new album.

On 6 May 2022 the band released the single I’m alright from their forthcoming album Jeder nur ein X - planned for release on 11 November 2022.

== Band members ==
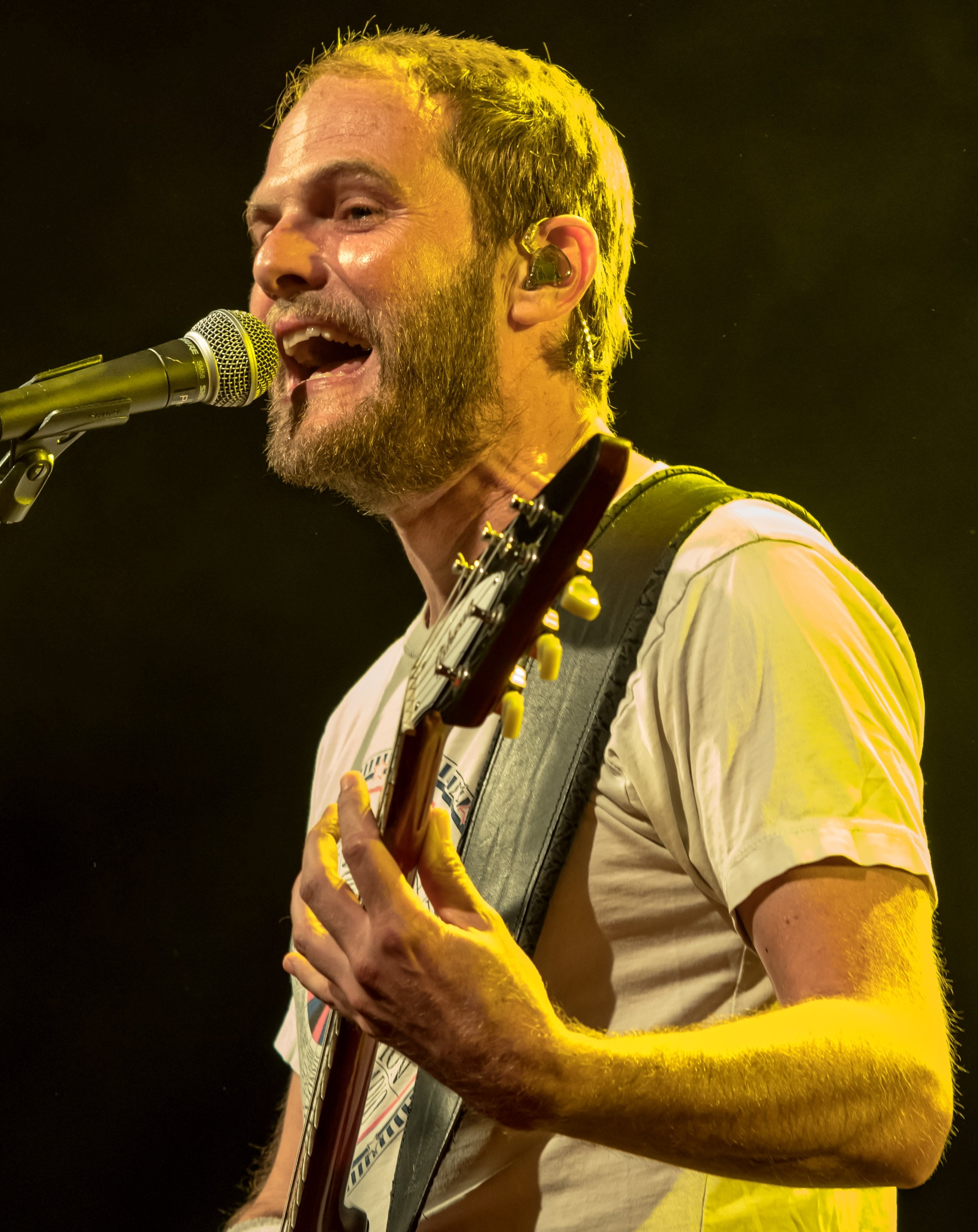
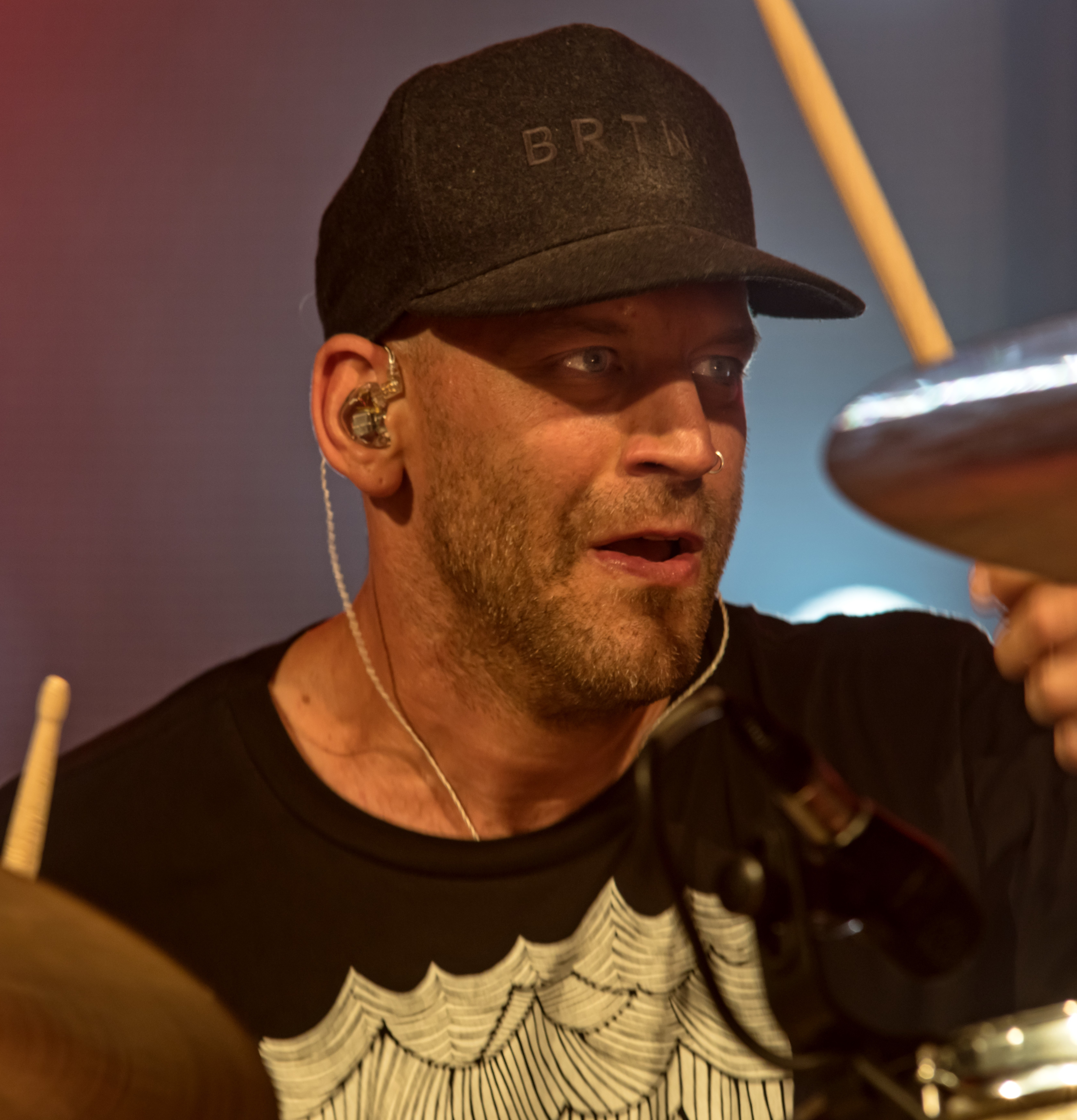
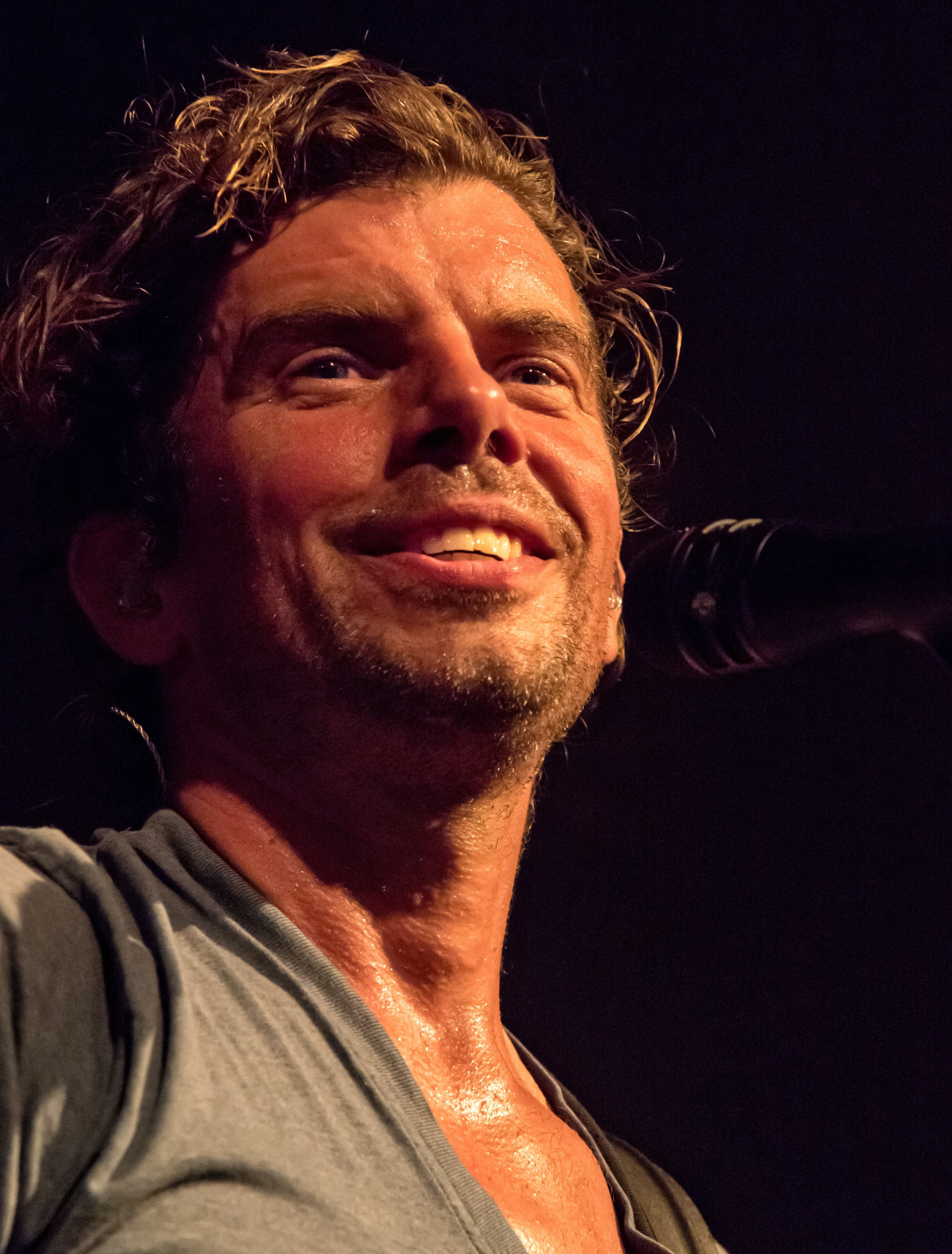
Brugger, Weber and Linhof at the Zelt-Musik-Festival 2017 in Freiburg, Germany

=== Current ===
- Peter Brugger – vocals, guitar (1995–present)
- Florian "Flo" Weber – drums (1995–present)
- Rüdiger "Rüde" Linhof – bass (1997–present)

=== Former ===
- Andi Erhard – bass (1995–1997)

== Discography ==
- 1996:
  - EP: Macht doch was ihr wollt, ich geh jetzt ("Do Whatever You Want, I'm Leaving")
- 1998:
  - EP: Thonträger ("Sound Storage Medium")
- 1999:
  - Single: "Wellenreiten '54" ("Surfing '54")
- 2000:
  - Album: So wie einst Real Madrid ("Like Real Madrid Once")
  - Single: "Fast wie von selbst" ("Almost by Itself")
  - Single: "Heimatlied" (Homesong)
  - Split-single: "Dancing with Tears in My Eyes" with Readymade
- 2001:
  - Split-single: "Friday I'm in Love" with Readymade
- 2002:
  - Album: Die gute Seite ("The Good Side")
  - Single: "Ein Kompliment" ("A Compliment")
  - Single: "Komm schon" ("Come On!")
  - Single: "Tage wie dieser" ("Days Like These")
  - Split-single: "Schwule Mädchen" ("Gay Girls") with Readymade (Ready Sport Go!3 Tour)
- 2003:
  - Single: "Ans Ende denken wir zuletzt" ("The End Is the Last Thing on Our Minds")
  - DVD: Ohren zu und durch ("Close Your Ears and Go Through with It")
- 2004:
  - Album: Burli ("Little Boy")
  - Album: Live
  - Single: "Siehst du das genauso?" ("Do You See It the Same Way?")
  - Single: "Ich Roque" ("I, Roque") feat. Roque Santa Cruz
  - Single: "1. Wahl" ("First Choice")
  - Single: "1. Wahl (2. Wahl)" ("First Choice (Second Choice)")
  - Single: "Ein kleiner Schritt (live)" ("A Small Step")
- 2006:
  - Album: You Have to Win Zweikampf
  - Single: "'54, '74, '90, 2006" (fifth-best-selling album in Germany in 2006)
  - Single: "Pogo in Togo"
  - Single: "Eine Liebe, die nie endet" ("A Love That Never Ends")
- 2007:
  - Album: La Bum (94th-best-selling album in Germany in 2007)
  - Single: "Alles Roger" ("Everything's Fine")
  - Single: "(Tu nur das) was dein Herz dir sagt" ("Do Only What Your Heart Tells You")
  - Single: "Antinazi Bund" ("Anti-Nazi Alliance"), stand-alone single, not included on the La Bum album
  - Single: "Advent, Advent" (exclusively released via fan club newsletter in December 2007)
- 2009:
  - Album: MTV Unplugged in New York (14th-best-selling album in Germany in 2009)
  - Single: "Ein Kompliment (Unplugged)" (26th-best-selling single in Germany in 2009)
- 2013:
  - Album: New York, Rio, Rosenheim
  - Single: "Applaus, Applaus" ("Applause, Applause")
  - Single: "New York, Rio, Rosenheim"
- 2016:
  - Album: Sturm & Stille
  - Single: "Das Geschenk" ("The Gift")
  - Single: "Raus in den Rausch"
- 2022:
  - Album: JEDER NUR EIN X
