= Teisendorf =

- Municipality
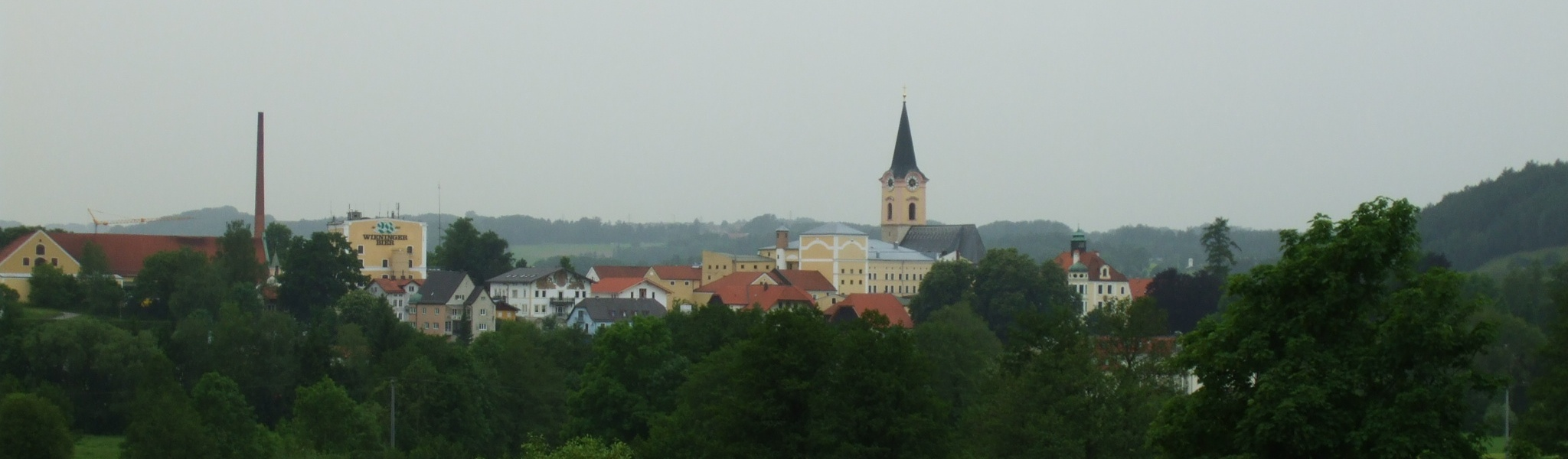
- Teisendorf

- Coat of arms

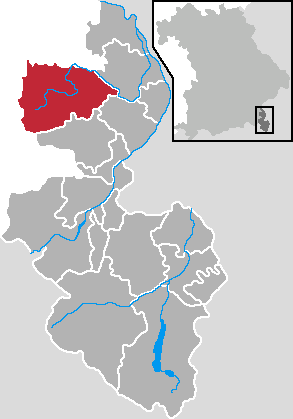
- Location of Teisendorf within Berchtesgadener Land district
- Interactive map of Teisendorf
- Location within Germany Location within Bavaria
- Coordinates: 47°51′N 12°49′E
- Country: Germany
- State: Bavaria
- Admin. region: Oberbayern
- District: Berchtesgadener Land

Government
  - Mayor (2020–26): Thomas Gasser (CSU)

Area
  - Total: 86.77 km^{2} (33.50 sq mi)
- Elevation: 501 m (1,644 ft)

Population (2025-12-31)
  - Total: 9,323
  - Density: 107.4/km^{2} (278.3/sq mi)
- Time zone: UTC+01:00 (CET)
  - Summer (DST): UTC+02:00 (CEST)
- Postal codes: 83317, 83364
- Dialling codes: 08666
- Vehicle registration: BGL
- Website: www.teisendorf.de

Teisendorf (Central Bavarian: Deisndorf) is a municipality in the district of Berchtesgadener Land in Bavaria in Germany.

== People ==
- Tobias Regner (born 1982), singer and guitarist
