= Tobias Regner =

German singer and guitarist (born 1982)

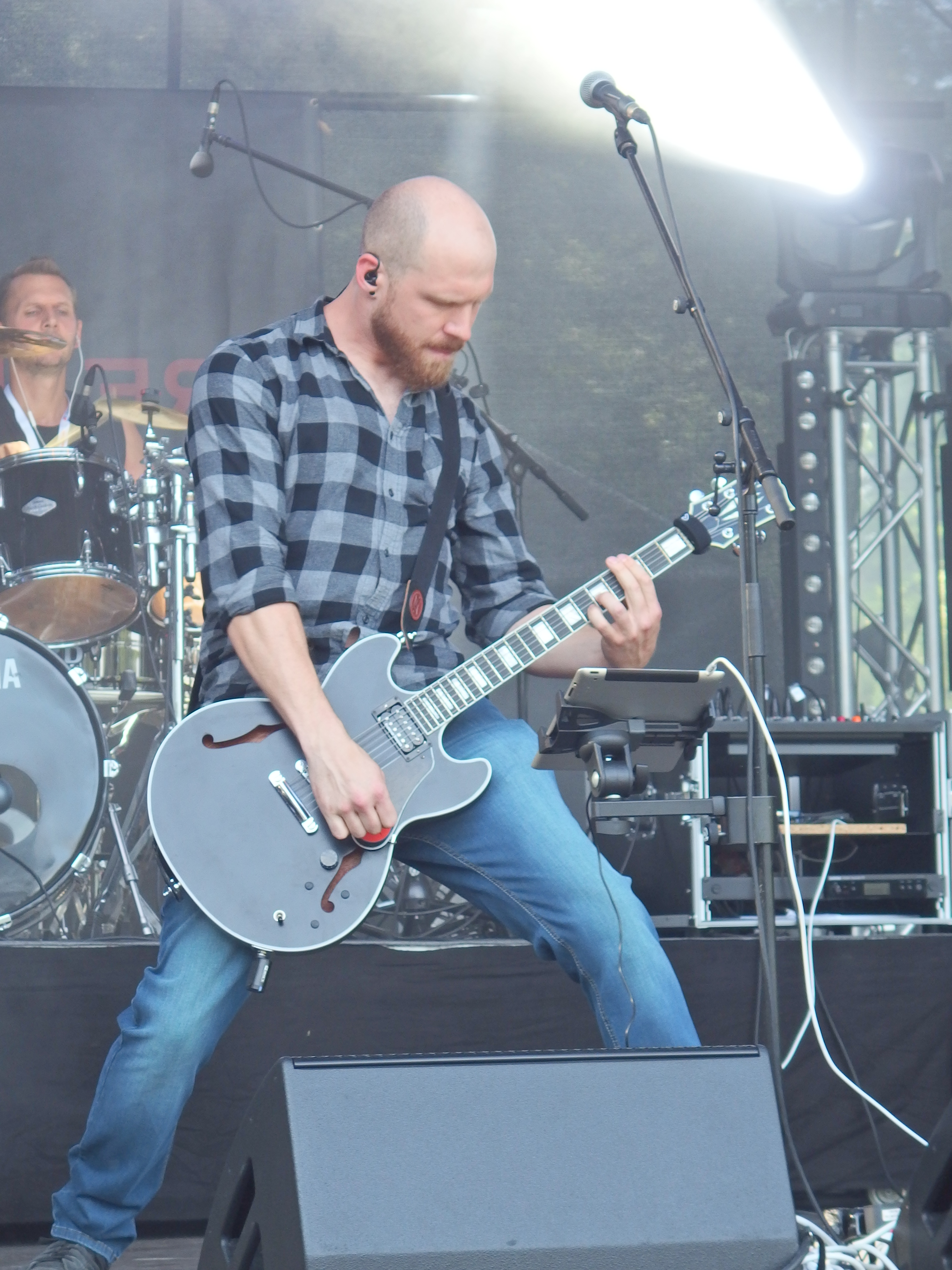
- Regner in 2017.

Background information
- Born: 5 August 1982 (age 43); Teisendorf, Bavaria, Germany
- Genres: Rock
- Occupations: Singer, musician
- Instruments: Vocals, guitar
- Years active: 2006–present
- Label: Sony BMG Domestic (2006–2007)

Tobias Regner (born 5 August 1982) is a German singer and guitarist. He made his debut under major label Sony BMG Domestic after he won the highly publicized third season of the television series Deutschland sucht den Superstar, the German version of Pop Idol, in 2006.

== Career ==
=== 2005–2006: Deutschland sucht den Superstar ===
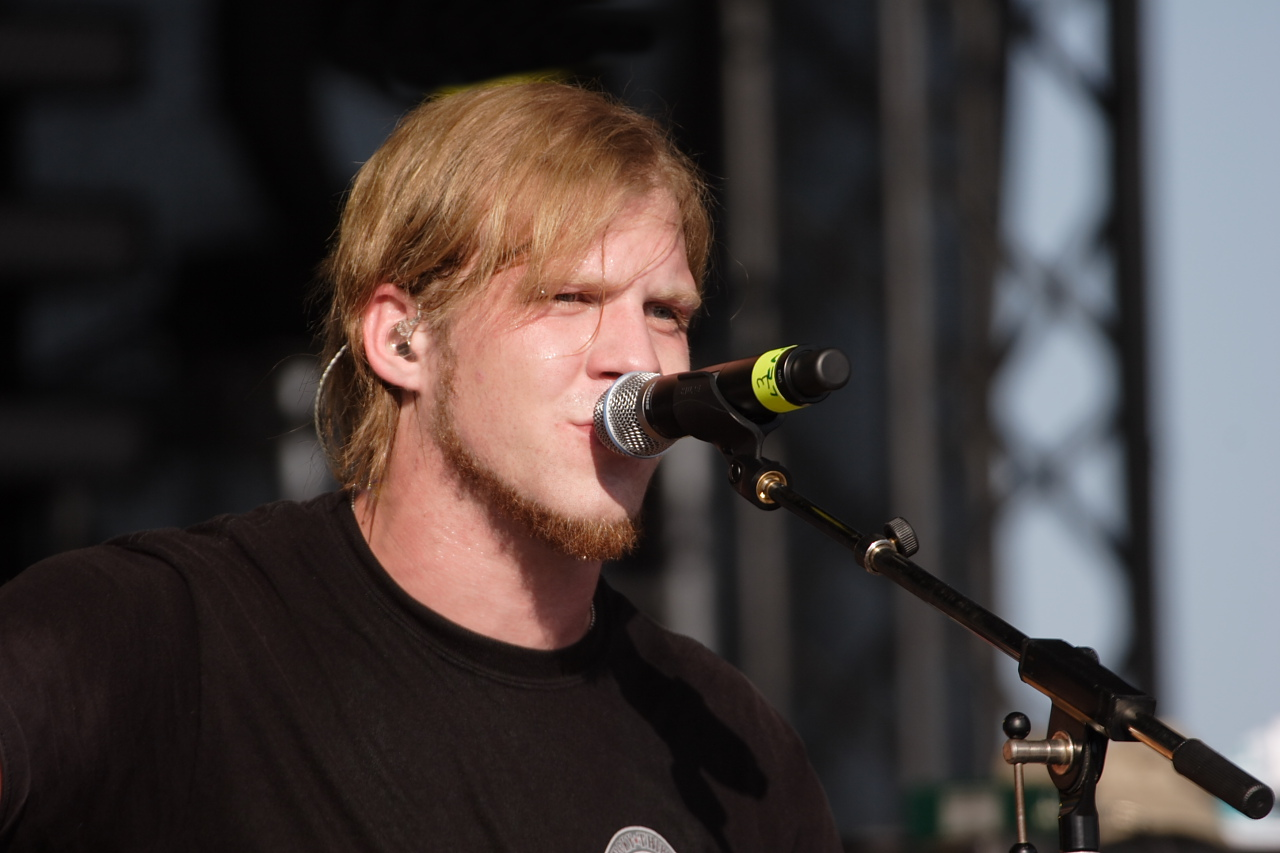
Regner performing in 2006

After his graduation from University of Salzburg, Regner auditioned for the third installment of the reality television program Deutschland sucht den Superstar. He entered the competition with 14,000 others, and the judges Dieter Bohlen, Heinz Henn and Sylvia Kollek were impressed with his voice and unconventional style. After several "re-calls" and week-by-week performances, Regner earned a position in the Top 10 finalists, eventually making it to the final two contestants on Deutschland sucht den Superstar, and on 18 March 2006, he won the competition and earned 54.6% of the audience vote over Mike Leon Grosch, making him the first rock artist to win the show, before Thomas Godoj won the competition in 2008. Overwhelmed, Regner performed his "exclusive" song "I Still Burn", a rock-ballad written by Peter Wright and Jess Cates. When released as a single via Sony BMG Domestic on 14 March 2006, it instantly entered the charts at No. 1 in Austria, Germany, and Switzerland, simultaneously emerging as the biggest-selling single since 2004 within its first week of release. The song was eventually certified platinum by the IFPI for more than 300,000 copies sold.

Performance at Deutschland sucht den Superstar
Top-20-Show	Song	Original Artist	Percentage (place)
1. Top-20-Show	"Hero"	Chad Kroeger	9.95% (5/10)
3. Top-20-Show	"Nothing Else Matters"	Metallica	Advanced to Top 10
Mottoshow	Song	Original Artist	Caller in Percent
Greatest Hits	"The Reason"	Hoobastank	8.7% (4/10)
Greatest Hits of the 80's	"Purple Rain"	Prince	28.9% (1/9)
Rock	"It's My Life"	Bon Jovi	15.2% (3/8)
Big Band	"Fly Me to the Moon"	Frank Sinatra	13.6% (4/7)
Love Songs	"Jessie"	Joshua Kadison	11.1% (5/6)
Number One Hits	"Join Me"	HIM	28.3% (1/5)
Number One Hits	"I Don't Want to Miss a Thing"	Aerosmith	28.3% (1/5)
Soul	"Lovely Day"	Bill Withers	28.9% (2/4)
Soul	"Easy"	The Commodores	28.9% (2/4)
Soft Rock and Ballads	"How You Remind Me"	Nickelback	59.2% (1/3)
Soft Rock and Ballads	"Here Without You"	3 Doors Down	59.2% (1/3)
Soft Rock and Ballads	"Father and Son"	Cat Stevens	59.2% (1/3)
Finale	"Beautiful Day"	U2	54.6% (1/2)
Finale	"Purple Rain"	Prince	54.6% (1/2)
Finale	"I Still Burn"	Tobias	54.6% (1/2)

Following the successful release of "I Still Burn", Regner's full-length debut album Straight was released on 28 April 2006. American producers Max Martin and Desmond Child consulted on the album which debuted at number one on the German Media Control 100 and also peaked within the Top 5 in Austria, and the Top 20 in Switzerland. Eventually, the album was certified gold by the IFPI for sales of more than 100,000 copies. Reviews for the album were generally favorable, with LAUT's critic Dani Fromm praising the "versatile, powerful-voiced and likeable" character of Regner's music, and others calling it "unidirectional" but "positive", comparing it to Jon Bon Jovi. However, further singles – "She's So" and the Open Season theme song "Cool Without You" – failed to chart or sell noticeably. Regner was dropped eventually from his record label.

== Discography ==
=== Albums ===
List of albums, with selected chart positions and certifications
Title	Album details	Peak chart positions		
Title	Album details	GER	AUT	SWI
Straight	Released: 28 April 2006; Label: Sony BMG; Formats: CD, digital download	1	5	14
Kurz unsterblich	Released: 30 April 2010; Label: Tag-7; Formats: CD, digital download	—	—	—
Akustisch	Released: 1 April 2011; Label: Tag-7; Formats: CD, digital download	—	—	—
Besser jetzt	Released: 19 July 2013; Label: Tag-7; Formats: CD, digital download	—	—	—
Ohne Netz und doppelten Boden	Released: 10 April 2015; Label: Tag-7; Formats: CD, digital download	—	—	—
Handschrift	Released: 31 January 2017; Label: Self-released; Formats: CD, digital download	—	—	—

=== Singles ===
List of singles, with selected chart positions and parent album
Title	Year	Peak chart positions			Album
Title	Year	GER	AUT	SWI	Album
"I Still Burn"	2006	1	1	1	Straight
"She's So"	2006	38	65	91	Straight
"Cool Without You"	2006	46	—	—	Straight

Preceded by Elli Erl	Deutschland sucht den Superstar; Winner; Season 3 (2006)	Succeeded by Mark Medlock
