= Deutschland sucht den Superstar season 3 =

Deutschland sucht den Superstar
- Season 3
- Hosted by: Tooske Ragas & Marco Schreyl
- Judges: Dieter Bohlen; Sylvia Kollek; Heinz Henn
- Winner: Tobias Regner
- Runner-up: Mike Leon Grosch

Release
- Original network: RTL
- Original release: 16 November 2005 – 18 March 2006

Season chronology
- ← Previous; Season 2 Next → Season 4

The third season of Deutschland sucht den Superstar premiered on 16 November 2005 and continued until 18 March 2006. It was won by Tobias Regner. The season was co-hosted by Tooske Ragas and Marco Schreyl.

== Finalists ==
(Ages stated at time of contest)

Contestant	Age	Hometown	Voted off	Liveshow theme
Tobias Regner	23	Teisendorf	Winner	Grand Finale
Mike Leon Grosch	29	Cologne	18 March 2006	Grand Finale
Vanessa Jean Dedmon	18	Wetzlar	11 March 2006	Soft Rock
Nevio Passaro	25	Neustadt an der Aisch	25 February 2006	Soul
Didi Knoblauch	24	Illerkirchberg	18 February 2006	Number One Hits
Anna-Maria Zimmermann	16	Rietberg	11 February 2006	Love Songs
Daniel Muñoz	21	Pforzheim	4 February 2006	Big Band
Lena Hanenburg	16	Kevelaer	21 January 2006	Rock
Stephan Darnstaedt	18	Oberschopfheim	Withdrew	
Dascha Semcov	17	Erfurt	14 January 2006	The Greatest Hits of the 80s
Carolina Escolano	21	Pforzheim	7 January 2006	The Greatest Hits of All Time

== Top 20 Shows ==
=== 1st Top 20 Show (Boys) ===
- Menowin Fröhlich made it into the Top 20 Shows but was disqualified after he was sentenced to two years in jail for fraud and injury. Markus Derwall took his place in the competition. In season 7, Fröhlich auditioned for the show once again and made it to the final 2.

Contestant	Song (Artist)	Percentage/ calls
Nevio Passaro	When You Say Nothing at All (Ronan Keating)	24,80% (1/10)
Mike Leon Grosch	Don't Let the Sun Go Down on Me (Elton John)	21,19% (2/10)
Stephan Darnstaedt	Anywhere For You (Backstreet Boys)	5,04% (7/10)
Tobias Regner	Hero (Chad Kroeger)	9,95% (5/10)
Didi Knoblauch	When a Man Loves a Woman (Michael Bolton)	10,44% (4/10)
Gian-Luca Krykon	Right Here Waiting (Richard Marx)	1,95% (9/10)
Markus Derwall	Private Emotion (Ricky Martin)	4,78% (8/10)
Julian Kasprzik	All or Nothing (O-Town)	1,44% (10/10)
Fabian Behnisch	Heaven (Bryan Adams)	8,46% (6/10)
Daniel Muñoz	How Deep Is Your Love (Take That)	11.95% (3/10)

Bottom 4: Gian-Luca, Markus, Julian, Stephan

Eliminated: Gian-Luca, Markus, Julian

- The only reason that the percentiles are shown in this show because there was a mix up in the voting (Stephan Darnstaedt was declared to be leaving the show until cleared up that the host misread the card) and were later published after this show.

=== 1st Top 20 Show (Girls) ===
Contestant	Song (Artist)	Percentage/ calls
Sharyhan Osman	If I Ain't Got You (Alicia Keys)	
Anna-Maria Zimmermann	I'm So Excited (Pointer Sisters)	
Angelika Wolf	Don't Speak (No Doubt)	Elim
Dascha Semcov	I Believe (Joana Zimmer)	
Lena Hanenburg	We Are Family (Sister Sledge)	
Selina Mateo	Beautiful (Christina Aguilera)	Elim
Carolina Escolano	Can't Fight the Moonlight (LeAnn Rimes)	Btm 4
Laura Holstermann	Unbreak My Heart (Toni Braxton)	Elim
Meri Voskanian	You Might Need Somebody (Shola Ama)	
Vanessa Jean Dedmon	There You'll Be (Faith Hill)	

Bottom 4: Angelika, Carolina, Selina, Laura

Eliminated: Angelika, Selina, Laura

=== 2nd Top 20 Show (Boys) ===
Contestant	Song (Artist)	Percentage/ calls
Mike Leon Grosch	Bed of Roses (Bon Jovi)	
Didi Knoblauch	If You Don't Know Me By Now (Simply Red)	Elim
Fabian Behnisch	Can You Feel the Love Tonight (Elton John)	Elim
Nevio Passaro	Yesterday (The Beatles)	
Tobias Regner	Nothing Else Matters (Metallica)	
Daniel Muñoz	Purest of Pain (Son By Four)	Btm 4
Stephan Darnstaedt	Hello (Lionel Richie)	Btm 3

Bottom 4: Didi, Stephan, Daniel, Fabian

Eliminated: Didi, Fabian

Advancing to the Top 10: Mike Leon, Nevio, Tobias, Daniel, Stephan

=== 2nd Top 20 Show (Girls) ===
Contestant	Song (Artist)	Percentage/ calls
Meri Voskanian	Killing Me Softly (Fugees)	Elim
Sharyhan Osman	What If (Kate Winslet)	Elim
Lena Hanenberg	Lady Marmalade (Labelle)	Btm 3
Vanessa Jean Dedmon	Living To Love You (Sarah Connor)	
Dascha Semcov	Angel (Sarah McLachlan)	Btm 4
Carolina Escolano	Get On Your Feet (Gloria Estefan)	
Anna-Maria Zimmermann	It Must Have Been Love (Roxette)	

Bottom 4: Lena, Meri, Dascha, Sharyhan

Eliminated: Meri, Sharyhan

Advancing to the Top 10: Vanessa, Carolina, Anna-Maria, Dascha, Lena

== Finals ==
=== Contestants ===
Stephan Darnstaedt, born on 10 October 1987 was a contestant of the third season. Darnstaedt left DSDS just one day before the third 'theme show', being replaced by Didi Knoblauch. He was known to sing songs from boy bands. Darnstaedt was not a favorite of the competition and was in the bottom groups during both Top 20 shows. Nevertheless, he ranked in the top half of voting during the theme show before his departure.

Vanessa Jean Dedmon, born 28 April 1987 to Russel and Waltraud Dedmon was a semifinalist in the third season and was voted out in the Top 3 Show.

Carolina Escolano-Fernandez, born 19 March 1984 in Pforzheim, Germany, was a contestant in the third season. She is of Spanish descent.

Didi Knoblauch (a.k.a. Jamie Dwayne Knoblauch and of trans-sexual gender), was born Diana Knoblauch 15 December 1980 in Illerkirchberg/Baden-Württemberg, Germany. Knoblauch is a member of the rock 'n' roll cover band The Cash in Baden-Württemberg. Knoblauch was eliminated in the second Top 20 show but was brought back into the competition as Stephan Darnstaedt quit.

Dascha Semcov was born 30 March 1988 in Kishinev, Moldova. Prior to Superstar, Dascha had been in Germany for only 18 months. Her father Alexej and mother Diana moved from Moldova to Erfurt. Semcov performed in three musicals which includes Starlight Express. She is also performing part of the band Soul AG from Weimar.

Daniel Muñoz-Repko, born on 28 December 1983, was a contestant in the third season. Daniel is of mixed Spanish and Dutch ethnicity.

=== 1st Theme Show: "Die größten Hits aller Zeiten" (Greatest Hits of All Time) ===
Contestant	Song (Artist)	Percentage/ calls
Mike Leon Grosch	She's Like the Wind (Patrick Swayze)	13,10% (3/10)
Anna-Maria Zimmermann	I Will Survive (Gloria Gaynor)	5,70% (7/10)
Daniel Muñoz	Hero (Enrique Iglesias)	4,70% (8/10)
Carolina Escolano	Let's Get Loud (Jennifer Lopez)	3,40% (10/10)
Lena Hanenburg	How Do I Live (LeAnn Rimes)	3,50% (9/10)
Tobias Regner	The Reason (Hoobastank)	8,70% (4/10)
Dascha Semcov	Black Velvet (Alannah Myles)	5,80% (6/10)
Stephan Darnstaedt	You Are Not Alone (Michael Jackson)	6,80% (5/10)
Nevio Passaro	Your Song (Elton John)	13,30% (2/10)
Vanessa Jean Dedmon	Run to You (Whitney Houston)	35,10% (1/10)

- Bottom 3: Anna-Maria, Carolina, Stephan
- Eliminated: Carolina
- Judges' forecasts: Stephan (All)

=== 2nd Theme Show: "Die größten Hits der 80er" (Greatest Hits of the 80s) ===
Original airdate: 10 March 2007

Contestant	Song (Artist)	Percentage/ calls
Anna-Maria Zimmermann	Walking on Sunshine (Katrina and The Waves)	7,30% (6/9)
Daniel Muñoz	Another Day in Paradise (Phil Collins)	4,20% (8/9)
Lena Hanenburg	Upside Down (Diana Ross)	4,50% (7/9)
Dascha Semcov	Manic Monday (The Bangles)	3,90% (9/9)
Nevio Passaro	Every Breath You Take (Sting/The Police)	11,20% (5/9)
Tobias Regner	Purple Rain (Prince)	28,90% (1/9)
Mike Leon Grosch	The Power of Love (Huey Lewis and the News)	12,20% (3/9)
Vanessa Jean Dedmon	Time After Time (Cyndi Lauper)	15,70% (2/9)
Stephan Darnstaedt	Forever Young (Alphaville)	12,10% (4/9)

- Bottom 3: Lena, Daniel Dascha
- Eliminated: Dascha
- Judges' forecasts: Daniel (Dieter, Heinz), Stephan (Sylvia)

=== 3rd Theme Show: "Die größten Rock-Songs" (The Greatest Rock Songs) ===
Didi Knoblauch is there for Stephan Darnstaedt (withdrew)

Contestant	Song (Artist)	Percentage/ calls
Lena Hanenburg	Ironic (Alanis Morissette)	6,40% (8/8)
Nevio Passaro	I Do It for You (Bryan Adams)	10,50% (6/8)
Daniel Muñoz	Hold the Line (Toto)	6,50% (7/8)
Anna-Maria Zimmermann	The Best (Tina Turner)	10,70% (5/8)
Mike Leon Grosch	Still Got the Blues (Gary Moore)	19,70% (2/8)
Vanessa Jean Dedmon	Knockin' on Heaven's Door (Avril Lavigne)	11,00% (4/8)
Didi Knoblauch	The Final Countdown (Europe)	20,00% (1/8)
Tobias Regner	It's My Life (Bon Jovi)	15,20% (3/8)

- Bottom 3: Daniel, Nevio, Lena
- Eliminated: Lena
- Judges' forecasts: Didi (Dieter), Lena (Sylvia, Heinz)

=== 4th Theme Show: "Swing/Big Band" ===
Contestant	Song (Artist)	Percentage/ calls
Anna-Maria Zimmermann	Diamonds Are a Girl's Best Friend (Marilyn Monroe)	14,30% (3/7)
Nevio Passaro	Feeling Good (Michael Bublé)	11,50% (6/7)
Daniel Muñoz	Quando, Quando, Quando (Michael Bublé)	5,90% (7/7)
Tobias Regner	Fly Me to the Moon (Frank Sinatra)	13,60% (4/7)
Didi Knoblauch	Beyond the Sea (Robbie Williams)	13,50% (5/7)
Vanessa Jean Dedmon	Somewhere Over the Rainbow (Judy Garland)	17,40% (2/7)
Mike Leon Grosch	I Get a Kick Out of You (Frank Sinatra)	23,90% (1/7)

- Bottom 3: Didi, Daniel Nevio
- Eliminated: Daniel
- Judges' forecasts: Daniel (Dieter, Heinz), Didi (Sylvia)

=== 5th Theme Show: "Liebeslieder" (Love Songs) ===
Contestant	Song (Artist)	Percentage/ calls
Tobias Regner	Jessie (Joshua Kadison)	11,10% (5/6)
Anna-Maria Zimmermann	Wish You Were Here (Rednex)	10,70% (6/6)
Didi Knoblauch	Unchained Melody (The Righteous Brothers)	18,80% (3/6)
Nevio Passaro	Se Bastasse Una Canzone (Eros Ramazzotti)	17,40% (4/6)
Mike Leon Grosch	Love's Divine (Seal)	21,80% (1/6)
Vanessa Jean Dedmon	Hero (Mariah Carey)	20,20% (2/6)

- Bottom 3: Nevio, Anna-Maria, Tobias
- Eliminated: Anna-Maria
- Judges' forecasts: Didi (Dieter, Heinz), Anna-Maria (Sylvia)

=== 6th Theme Show: "Nummer 1" (Number 1) ===
Contestant	Song (Artist)	Percentage/ calls
Didi Knoblauch	Pretty Woman (Roy Orbison)	12,00% (5/5)
Didi Knoblauch	Would I Lie to You? (Charles & Eddie)	12,00% (5/5)
Mike Leon Grosch	Reality (Richard Sanderson)	17,10% (3/5)
Mike Leon Grosch	In the Ghetto (Elvis)	17,10% (3/5)
Nevio Passaro	Ich kenne nichts (Xavier Naidoo)	27,00% (2/5)
Nevio Passaro	Candle in the Wind (Elton John)	27,00% (2/5)
Vanessa Jean Dedmon	I Wanna Dance With Somebody (Whitney Houston)	15,60% (4/5)
Vanessa Jean Dedmon	Without You (Mariah Carey)	15,60% (4/5)
Tobias Regner	Join Me in Death (HIM)	28,30% (1/5)
Tobias Regner	I Don't Wanna Miss a Thing (Aerosmith)	28,30% (1/5)

- Bottom 3: Mike Leon, Didi, Vanessa
- Eliminated: Didi
- Judges' forecasts: Didi (All)

=== 7th Theme Show: "Soul" ===
Contestant	Song (Artist)	Percentage/ calls
Nevio Passaro	I Believe I Can Fly (R. Kelly)	19,80% (4/4)
Nevio Passaro	Ain't No Sunshine (Bill Withers)	19,80% (4/4)
Vanessa Jean Dedmon	Get Here (Oleta Adams)	20,90% (3/4)
Vanessa Jean Dedmon	Fallin' (Alicia Keys)	20,90% (3/4)
Tobias Regner	Lovely Day (Bill Withers)	28,90% (2/4)
Tobias Regner	Easy (Like Sunday Morning) (Lionel Richie)	28,90% (2/4)
Mike Leon Grosch	Kiss from a Rose (Seal)	30,30% (1/4)
Mike Leon Grosch	All Night Long (Lionel Richie)	30,30% (1/4)

- Bottom 3: Vanessa, Mike Leon, Nevio
- Eliminated: Nevio
- Judges' forecasts: Tobias (Dieter), Mike Leon (Sylvia, Heinz)

=== 8th Theme Show: "Kuschelrock" (Soft Rock) ===
Contestant	Song (Artist)	Percentage/ calls
Mike Leon Grosch	Mandy (Barry Manilow or Westlife)	23,70% (2/3)
Mike Leon Grosch	Against All Odds (Phil Collins)	23,70% (2/3)
Mike Leon Grosch	You Are So Beautiful (Joe Cocker) … dedicated to Vanessa Jean Dedmon	23,70% (2/3)
Vanessa Jean Dedmon	I Turn to You (Christina Aguilera)	17,10% (3/3)
Vanessa Jean Dedmon	Greatest Love of All (Whitney Houston)	17,10% (3/3)
Vanessa Jean Dedmon	Für dich (Yvonne Catterfeld) … dedicated to Dedmond's sister	17,10% (3/3)
Tobias Regner	How You Remind Me (Nickelback)	59,20% (1/3)
Tobias Regner	Here Without You (3 Doors Down)	59,20% (1/3)
Tobias Regner	Father and Son (Yusuf Islam) … dedicated to Tobias Regners parents	59,20% (1/3)

- Bottom 3: All
- Eliminated: Vanessa
- Judges' forecasts: Tobias (Dieter), Vanessa (Heinz, Sylvia)

=== Final ===
Contestant	Song (Artist)	Percentage/ calls
Mike Leon Grosch	Angels (Robbie Williams)	45,40% (2/2)
Mike Leon Grosch	Love's Divine (Seal)	45,40% (2/2)
Mike Leon Grosch	Down Let It Get You Down (Winner Song)	45,40% (2/2)
Tobias Regner	Beautiful Day (U2)	54,60% (1/2)
Tobias Regner	Purple Rain (Prince)	54,60% (1/2)
Tobias Regner	I Still Burn (Winner Song)	54,60% (1/2)

- Winner: Tobias
- Runner-up: Mike Leon
- Winner Forecast: Mike Leon (Dieter), Tobias (Heinz, Sylvia)

== Semi-finals/finals elimination chart ==
Legend
Did not perform	Female	Male	Top 20	Top 10	Winner

Safe	Safe First	Safe Last	Eliminated	Did not perform

Stage:		Semi				Finals								
Week:		12/14/	12/17	12/21	12/28	1/7	1/14	1/21	2/4	2/11	2/18	2/25	3/11	3/18
Place	Contestant	Result												
1	Tobias Regner									Btm 2				Winner
2	Mike Leon Grosch										Btm 3			Runner-up
3	Vanessa Jean Dedmon										Btm 2	Btm 2	Elim	
4	Nevio Passaro							Btm 3	Btm 2			Elim		
5	Didi Knoblauch			Elim					Btm 3	Btm 3	Elim			
6	Anna-Maria Zimmermann									Elim				
7	Daniel Muñoz			Btm 4		Btm 3	Btm 2	Btm 2	Elim					
8	Lena Hanenburg					Btm 2	Btm 3	Elim						
Quit	Stephan Darnstaedt	Btm 4		Btm 3				Wdrw						
9	Dascha Semcov				Btm 4		Elim							
10	Carolina Escolano		Btm 4		Btm 3	Elim								
12-14	Meri Voskanian				Elim									
12-14	Sharyhan Osman				Elim									
12-14	Fabian Behnisch			Elim										
15-20	Angelika Wolf		Elim											
15-20	Laura Holstermann		Elim											
15-20	Selina Mateo		Elim											
15-20	Markus Derwall	Elim												
15-20	Gian Luka Krykon	Elim												
15-20	Julian Kasprzik	Elim												

^{1} Didi was eliminated from the competition but was brought back after Stephan Darnstaedt quit the competition.

Preceded by Season 2 (2003/04)	Deutschland sucht den Superstar; Season 3 (2005/06)	Succeeded by Season 4 (2007)
