= This Is My Life (Elli Erl song) =

Single by Elli Erl

from the album Shout It Out
- Released: March 22, 2004
- Recorded: 2004
- Length: 4:06
- Label: 19; Hansa; BMG
- Songwriter: Dieter Bohlen
- Producer: Dieter Bohlen

Elli Erl singles chronology
"This Is My Life" (2004)	"In My Dream" (2004)

"This Is My Life" is a song by German recording artist Elli Erl, the winner of the second season of the reality television talent show Deutschland sucht den Superstar, broadcast in 2004. Written and produced by DSDS judge Dieter Bohlen, it served as Erl's coronation song. Released on March 22, 2004 in German-speaking Europe, it debuted at number three on the German Singles Chart and peaked at number six in Austria and number 11 in Switzerland. In total, the song sold 100,000 copies and was later included on her debut album, Shout It Out (2004).

== Formats and track listings ==
CD Single
No.	Title	Length
1.	"This Is My Life" (Radio Edit)	4:05
2.	"This Is My Life" (Alternative Edit)	3:42
3.	"This Is My Life" (Karaoke Radio Edit)	4:05
4.	"This Is My Life" (Karaoke Alternative Edit)	3:42

== Credits and personnel ==
Credits taken from Shout It Out liner notes.

- Arrangement, co-producer — Lalo Titenkov
- Artwork — Ronald Reinsberg
- Guitar — Jörn Heilbut
- Lyrics, music, production — Dieter Bohlen
- Mixing, co-producer — Jeo

== Charts ==
=== Weekly charts ===
Weekly chart performance for "This Is My Life"
Chart (2004)	Peak position
Austria (Ö3 Austria Top 40)	6
Germany (GfK)	3
Switzerland (Schweizer Hitparade)	11

=== Year-end charts ===
Year-end chart performance for"This Is My Life"
Chart (2004)	Position
Germany (GfK)	52
