= Elli Erl =

German singer

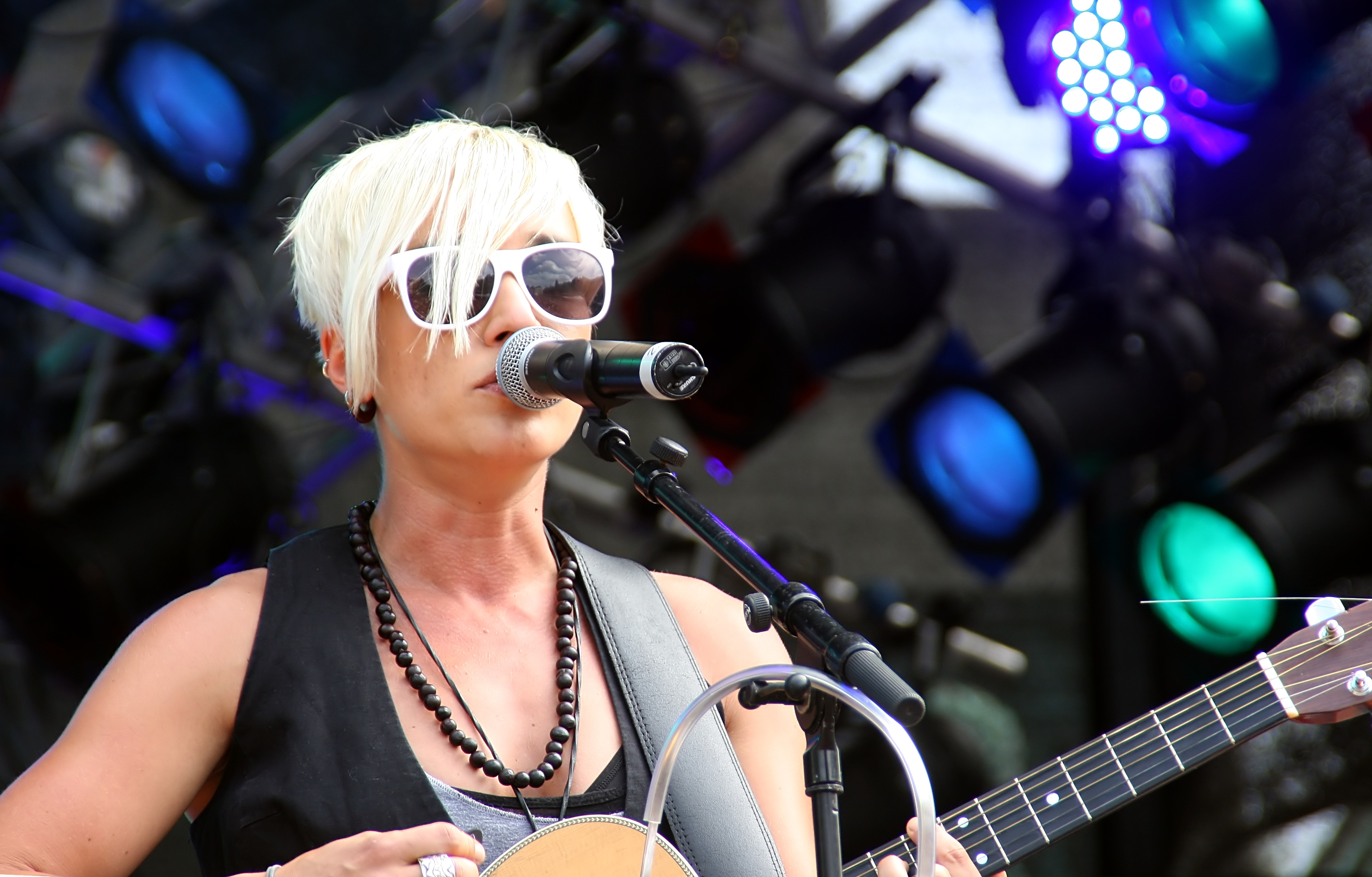
- Erl performing in 2009

Background information
- Born: Elisabeth Maria Erl; 25 May 1979 (age 47); Straubing, Bavaria, West Germany (now Germany)
- Genres: Rock, pop
- Occupations: Singer, songwriter, musician
- Instruments: Vocals, guitar
- Years active: 1999–present
- Label: Sony BMG
- Website: elli-e.com

Elisabeth Maria Erl (born 25 May 1979) is a German singer-songwriter. She came to fame as the winner of the second season of the television show Deutschland sucht den Superstar, the German Idol series adaptation. With DSDS, Erl appeared on the collaborative top ten single "Believe in Miracles", while her coronation song and debut single "This Is My Life" peaked at number three on the German Singles Chart and reached the top ten in Austria. Erl's pop rock-influenced debut studio album, Shout It Out (2003), reached the top forty of the German Albums Chart but was significantly less successful than previous DSDS releases.

Erl has since released three further albums, including Moving On (2007), Neue Generation (2008) and her latest effort Human (2009). While none of the singles released from these albums became major hit singles on the pop charts, songs such as "In My Dream", "Not My Type", "Get Up" and "Can't Deny It" entered the German Singles Chart. In 2005, Erl graduated in music and sports from University of Regensburg and is since working as a teacher at a secondary school in Düsseldorf. In 2011, she released the autobiography Gecastet.

== Early life ==
Erl was born on 25 May 1979 in Straubing, Bavaria. She is the daughter of Renate and Ludwig Erl and has two brothers named Josef and Ludwig Jr. In elementary school she started learning the trumpet, piano and the guitar opposite expanding interests in tennis, cycling and skiing. In her late teenage years she became the lead singer of several soul and rock bands, including The Gong FM Band, LOP and the more popular Panta Rei. After her high school graduation at Anton-Bruckner-Gymnasium Straubing, Elli decided to become a student teacher and began studying Music and Sports at Regensburg University.

== Career ==
In 2003, Erl participated in second season of the television show Deutschland sucht den Superstar, the German Idol series adaptation. Due to her massive stage experience, raspy voice and unconventional looks she was seen as an early favourite by the judges and also by the audience, who enabled her to sing against comrade-in-arms Denise Tillmanns during the final show in March 2004. However, in the end she beat out runner-up Tillmanns by a margin of 11 percent. Erl would remain the show's only female winner for nine years until its tenth season when Swiss singer Beatrice Egli won DSDS as the second female winner.

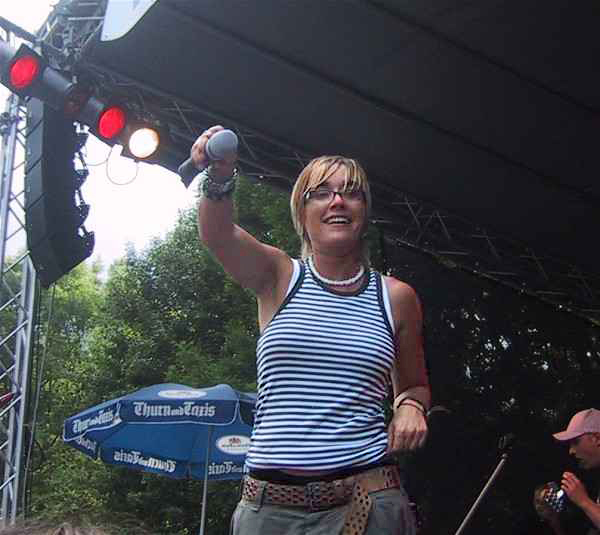
Erl in 2005

Erl's coronation song and debut single "This Is My Life, written and produced by DSDS judge Dieter Bohlen, was released in March 2004 on Hansa Records and BMG. The song peaked at number three on the German Singles Chart and reached number six in Austria and number 11 in Switzerland, but was less successful than "Take Me Tonight", the first single by DSDS's first season winner Alexander Klaws. Subsequently, Erl decided not to collaborate with Bohlen on her debut album, citing personal and musical differences with the judge. She eventually released her self-composed second single "In My Dreams", but neither the single nor her debut album Shout It Out could reach the top 30 once again. As a consequence she went on tour with her band Panta Rei for some time.

In winter 2006, Erl's previously unreleased record "Better Than the Best" was chosen to become the corporate song for DHL. After her 2007 album Moving On failed to make an impact she chose to get full creative control over her subsequent work and founded her own record label 1773 Records. Erl's third album Human was released in May 2009 through 1773 and was preceded by the single "Shadows".

== Private life ==
Nowadays, Erl is working as a teacher at a Realschule in Düsseldorf. Her father is headmaster in a Realschule in Regenstauf in Bavaria. Erl is bisexual and prefers to have relationships with women.

== Discography ==
=== Studio albums ===
Title	Album details	Peak positions		
Title	Album details	GER	AUT	SWI
Shout It Out	Released: 4 October 2004; Label: Hansa, Sony BMG; Formats: CD, digital download	33	—	—
Moving On	Released: 7 December 2007; Label: 313, Seven Days, Hitch; Formats: CD, digital download	—	—	—
Human	Released: 15 May 2009; Label: 1773; Formats: Digital download	—	—	—

=== Singles ===
Title	Year	Peak positions			Album
Title	Year	GER	AUT	SWI	Album
"This Is My Life"	2004	3	6	11	Shout It Out
"In My Dream"	2004	40	—	—	Shout It Out
"Not My Type"	2004	90	—	—	Shout It Out
"Get Up"	2006	71	—	—	Moving On
"Moving On"	2007	—	—	—	Moving On
"Can't Deny It"	2007	75	—	—	Moving On
"Shadows"	2009	—	—	—	Human

Preceded by Alexander Klaws	Deutschland sucht den Superstar; Winner; Season 2 (2004)	Succeeded by Tobias Regner
