= Mike Leon Grosch =

German singer

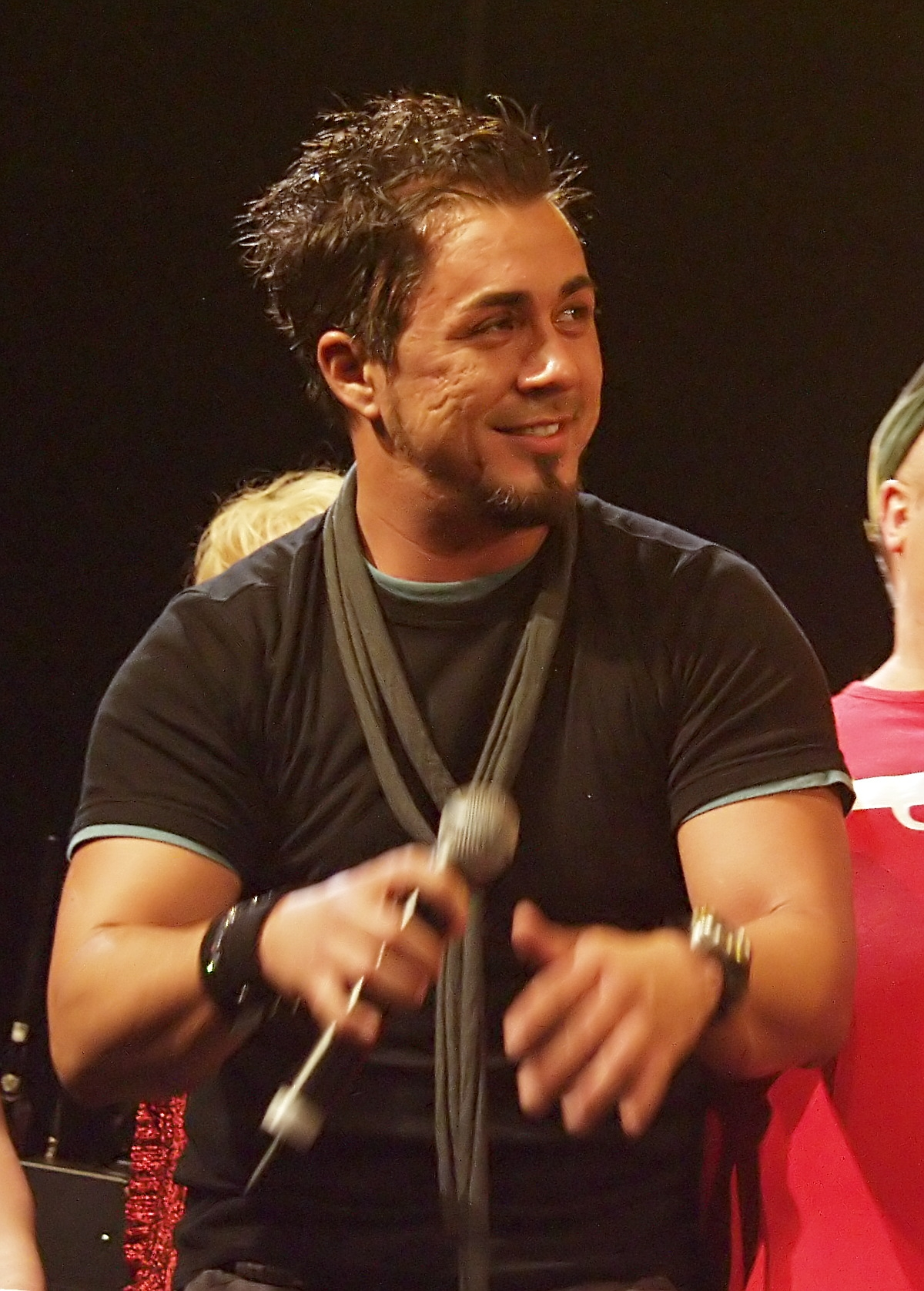
- Grosch at a charity concert in 2006

Background information
- Born: 2 November 1976 (age 50); Wuppertal, West Germany
- Genres: Pop, rock
- Occupation: Singer
- Years active: 2006–present
- Label: Sony BMG (2006)

Mike Leon Grosch (born 2 November 1976) is a German singer who came to fame as the runner-up of the third season of the television show Deutschland sucht den SuperStar, the German version of Pop Idol.

== Biography ==
Grosch was born in Wuppertal, North Rhine-Westphalia to a German-Australian father and Korean mother. He later moved to Cologne with his single mother Sung-Yun, who worked as a nurse there. He gained his first professional stage experience when he started singing at weddings and other ceremonies, while simultaneously performing with his own band.

Until autumn 2005, Grosch worked as a cell phone seller. At that time he took leave from his job to participate in the third season of Deutschland sucht den SuperStar (where he also became romantically involved with co-competitor Vanessa Jean Dedmon). Because of his strong, husky voice and a few similarities to British singer Seal, Grosch became an early favourite with the judges and the audience, who enabled him to sing against competitor Tobias Regner during the final show. However, Grosch lost by vote, scoring 45% against Regner.

In early March 2007, Grosch admitted to Bild, the biggest German daily tabloid, that Sony BMG would not continue their existing record contract with him and thus was being dropped. He also stated that so far no other record label had shown interest in working with him.

== Discography ==
=== Albums ===
List of albums, with selected chart positions and certifications
Title	Album details	Peak chart positions		
Title	Album details	GER	AUT	SWI
Absolute	Released: 26 May 2006; Formats: CD, digital download	1	2	6
Wenn wir uns wiedersehen	Released: 30 April 2021; Formats: CD, digital download	18	—	54
Tief	Released: 15 September 2023; Formats: CD, digital download	17	—	—

=== Singles ===
List of singles, with selected chart positions and parent album
Title	Year	Peak chart positions			Album
Title	Year	GER	AUT	SWI	Album
"Don't Let It Get You Down"	2006	1	6	2	Absolute
"Confessional"	2006	30	—	—	Absolute
