= Rapsoul =

German hip hop group

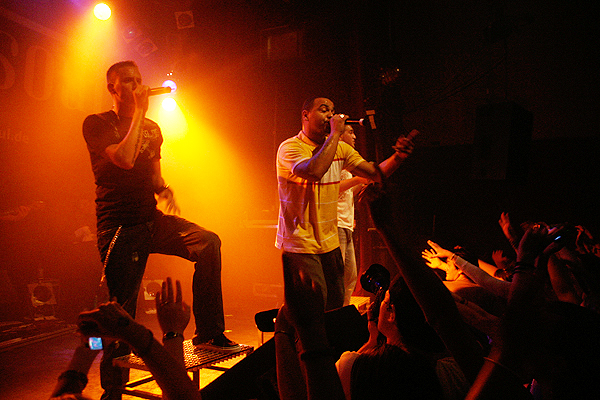
- Rapsoul in 2006

Background information
- Origin: Germany
- Genres: Pop, R&B, hip hop
- Years active: 2005–present
- Members: Jan-Markus Färger; Christopher Jimmy "C. J." Taylor; Steve Neumann
- Website: rapsoul.de

Rapsoul is a German hip-hop group.

== History ==
Färger and Neumann first worked together producing remixes for the Frankfurt-based record label 3p (Pelham Power Productions), working with the German pop/soul band Glashaus and rapper Sabrina Setlur. The two first appeared together as a rap duo as Dreckskind & Pechvogel (lit. "Child of Squalor and Unlucky Devil"), releasing an EP named LebensArt von Dreckskind & Pechvogel ("The LifeStyle of Child of Squalor and Unlucky Devil").

The duo's talent was spotted by a radio station based in Hesse, Germany, and one of their songs became a regular part of the radio station's 2004 summer tour of public swimming baths in Hessen. During this time, German commercial television station RTL's attention was drawn to the pair.

It was at this time that Jan and Steve, together with soul singer C.J. Taylor, decided to rename the band Rapsoul; a name which described the band's musical style. Following several successful live gigs, the band was invited to perform as the supporting act for the Backstreet Boys' October 2005 tour of Germany, Austria and Switzerland.

At the end of 2005, the band recorded their debut album, Unbeschrieblich ("Indescribable"), which was released in Germany on 31 March 2006. Their debut single, Verzweifelt ("Desperate"), released on 25 November 2005, peaked at number 21 in the German singles chart. Following the success of their debut single, the band released their second single, Gott schenk ihr Flügel ("God Give Her Wings"), on 17 March 2006. Their third single, Du und ich ("You and Me"), was released on 23 June 2006. All three of these singles made it into the German singles charts. 2006 also saw the band headline a tour for the first time.

The band recorded their fourth single, Sonnenschein ("Sunshine") with Vanessa Jean Dedmon, a semi-finalist from the third series of Deutschland sucht den Superstar (the German version of Pop Idol). The song reached number 17 in the German charts.

Rapsoul's second album Achterbahn ("Rollercoaster") was released in 2007, from which the singles Erste Liebe ("First Love"), Laura, König der Welt ("King of the World") and Sterben für dich ("Die for You") were taken.

== Discography ==
- Unbeschreiblich (2006) (Indescribable)
- Achterbahn (2007) (Rollercoaster)
- Irgendwann (2009) (Some Day)

=== Singles ===
Year	Title	Chart positions				Album
Year	Title	DE	AT	CH	EU	Album
2005	"Verzweifelt"	21	51	-	67	Unbeschreiblich
2006	"Gott schenk ihr Flügel"	15	47	-	47	Unbeschreiblich
2006	"Du & ich"	27	-	-	137	Unbeschreiblich
2006	"Sonnenschein" (feat. Vanessa Jean Dedmon)	17	-	-	60	Unbeschreiblich
2007	"Erste Liebe"	14	50	-	54	Achterbahn
2007	"Laura"	56	-	-	-	Achterbahn
2008	"König der Welt"	38	-	-	-	Achterbahn
2008	"Sterben für dich"	-	-	-	-	Achterbahn
2009	"Tag Eins nach dir"	65	-	-	-	Irgendwann
2009	"Irgendwann"	-	-	-	-	Irgendwann

== Filmography ==
- Unbeschreiblich LIVE (2006) ("Indescribable LIVE")
