= Yvonne Catterfeld discography =

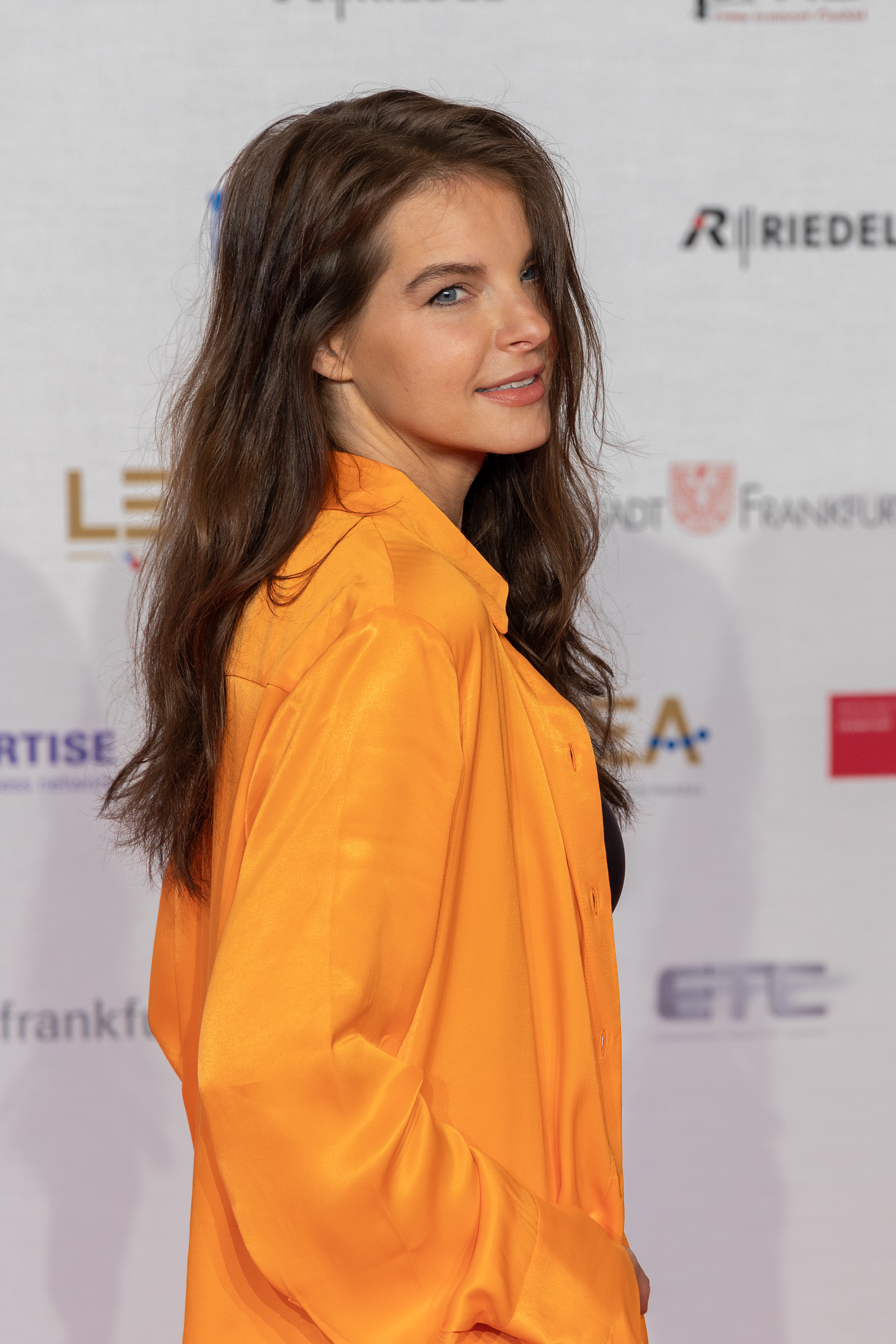
- Catterfeld in 2022
- Studio albums: 9
- Compilation albums: 2
- Singles: 15

German singer Yvonne Catterfeld has released eight studio albums, two compilation albums, two video albums and seventeen singles (including two as a featured artist). After finishing second in the inaugural season of the television competition Stimme 2000, she was signed to a recording deal with Hansa Records. In 2001, she released her first single, "Bum", under her stage name Catterfeld; the song failed to chart in any music market. Her first album, Meine Welt (2003), was preceded by four further singles, including "Niemand sonst" and "Gefühle", both of which reached the top forty of the German Albums Chart, and "Für dich" which reached number one in Austria, Germany and Switzerland and marked her commercial breakthrough. Meine Welt went Platinum in Germany and earned a Gold certification in Austria and Switzerland.

Farben meiner Welt, Catterfeld's second album, reached the top ten in Germany and earned a Gold certification from the Bundesverband Musikindustrie (BVMI). The album's lead single, "Du hast mein Herz gebrochen", was her second number one hit. Catterfeld's third album, Unterwegs, produced the top three single "Glaub an mich", and was also certified Gold by the BVMI. Her fourth record, Aura, debuted at number ten on the German Albums Chart and was less successful than its predecessors. While lead single "Erinner mich, dich zu vergessen" peaked at number six on the German Singles Chart, the follow-up, "Die Zeit ist reif", failed to reach the top 50.

Catterfeld released her fifth album, Blau im Blau, via Columbia Records in 2010. It marked a stronger shift towards the adult contemporary genre and peaked at number 37 on the German Albums Chart only, becoming her lowest-charting effort then. Lieber so, her sixth album, was released in 2013 and reached number 21 in Germany. Re-released in 2015, the album surpassed its initial peak when it climbed to number eight on the German Albums Chart following the broadcast of the second season of Sing meinen Song - Das Tauschkonzert, the German adaption of The Best Singers series. The second single, "Lieber so", reached number 23 in Germany, Catterfeld's highest-charting single in a decade. In 2017, Catterfeld released her seventh album Guten Morgen Freiheit which became her highest-charting album since Unterwegs (2005). Change, the singer's first English language album, was released in December 2021. It marked her first album to miss the top 40 as well as her lowest-charting album since Blau im Blau (2010). Change was followed by another English language album, dance-driven Move, which was released in March 2025.

== Albums ==
=== Studio albums ===
List of albums, with selected chart positions and certifications
Title	Album details	Peak chart positions			Certifications
Title	Album details	GER	AUT	SWI	Certifications
Meine Welt	Released: 26 May 2003; Label: BMG; Formats: CD	1	4	3	AUT: Gold; GER: Platinum; SWI: Gold
Farben meiner Welt	Released: 1 March 2004; Label: BMG, Hansa; Formats: CD	2	9	7	GER: Gold
Unterwegs	Released: 14 March 2005; Label: BMG, Hansa; Formats: CD, digital download	1	4	18	GER: Gold
Aura	Released: 20 October 2006; Label: Sony Music; Formats: CD, digital download	10	17	26	
Blau im Blau	Released: 5 March 2010; Label: Columbia, Sony Music; Formats: CD, digital download	37	44	—	
Lieber so	Released: 22 November 2013; Label: Columbia, Sony Music; Formats: CD, digital download	8	15	20	GER: Gold
Guten Morgen Freiheit	Released: 10 March 2017; Label: Veritable; Formats: CD, digital download	4	4	7	
Change	Released: 3 December 2021; Label: Veritable; Formats: CD, digital download	65	—	—	
Move	Released: 8 March 2025; Label: Seven.One Starwatch; Formats: CD, digital download	18	—	—	

=== Compilation albums ===
List of albums, with selected chart positions and certifications
Title	Album details	Peak chart positions			Certifications
Title	Album details	GER	AUT	SWI	Certifications
The Best of Yvonne Catterfeld – Von Anfang bis jetzt	Released: 14 October 2011; Label: Columbia, Sony Music; Formats: CD, digital download	—	—	—	
Best of	Released: 3 October 2014; Label: Sony Music; Formats: CD, digital download	—	—	—	

== Singles ==
=== As lead artist ===
Title	Year	Peak chart positions			Certifications	Album
Title	Year	GER	AUT	SWI	Certifications	Album
"Bum"	2001	—	—	—		Non-album single
"Komm zurück zu mir"	2001	76	—	—		Meine Welt
"Niemand sonst"	2002	31	—	—		Meine Welt
"Gefühle"	2002	26	—	—		Meine Welt
"Für dich"	2003	1	1	1	AUT: Gold; GER: Platinum; SWI: Gold	Meine Welt
"Du hast mein Herz gebrochen"	2004	1	4	6		Farben meine Welt
"Du bleibst immer noch du"	2004	21	30	53		Farben meine Welt
"Sag mir – Was meinst du?"	2004	14	21	39		Farben meine Welt
"Glaub an mich"	2005	3	6	15		Unterwegs
"Eine Welt ohne dich"	2005	31	52	—		Unterwegs
"Erinner mich, dich zu vergessen"	2006	6	22	23		Aura
"Die Zeit ist reif"	2007	55	—	—		Aura
"Immer noch"	2010	—	—	—		Blau im Blau
"Blau im Blau"	2010	52	—	—		Blau im Blau
"Frag nie warum" (featuring Cassandra Steen)	2010	—	—	—		Blau im Blau
"Pendel"	2013	59	—	—		Lieber so
"Lieber so"	2015	23	32	44		Lieber so
"People Get Ready"	2015	—	—	—		Non-album single
"Irgendwas" (featuring Bengio)	2016	27	17	41		Guten Morgen Freiheit
"Was bleibt"	2017	—	—	—		Guten Morgen Freiheit
"Besser werden"	2017	—	—	—		Guten Morgen Freiheit
"Freisprengen"	2017	—	—	—		Guten Morgen Freiheit
"Tür und Angel" (featuring Chima)	2017	—	—	—		Guten Morgen Freiheit
"Guten Morgen Freiheit"	2017	—	—	—		Guten Morgen Freiheit
"Elefantensong" (with Tom Beck)	2017	—	—	—		Liliane Susewind – Meine Songs
"Patience"	2021	—	—	—		Change
"Let You Go"	2021	—	—	—		Change
"Back in July"	2021	—	—	—		Change
"Move"	2024	—	—	—		Move
"In Between"	2024	—	—	—		Move
"Hands on Me"	2025	—	—	—		Move

=== As featured artist ===
Title	Year	Peak chart positions			Album
Title	Year	GER	AUT	SWI	Album
"Du bist nicht allein" (with Zeichen der Zeit)	2003	8	32	63	Zeichen der Zeit
"Where Does the Love Go?" (Eric Benét featuring Yvonne Catterfeld)	2006	28	43	35	Hurricane

=== Other charted songs ===
Title	Year	Peak chart positions			Album
Title	Year	GER	AUT	SWI	Album
"Hey"	2015	17	27	29	Sing meinen Song sampler

== Appearances ==
Song	Year	Artist(s)	Album
"Whenever You Need a Friend"	2000	Yvonne Catterfeld	Stimme 2000 – Die Finalisten
"Niemandsland"	2002	Yvonne Catterfeld, Udo Lindenberg	Mitten im Leben – Das Tribute Album
"Nangijala"	2002	Yvonne Catterfeld, Udo Lindenberg	Mitten im Leben – Das Tribute Album
"Du, Weißt Du..."	2005	Yvonne Catterfeld	Selma – In Sehnsucht eingehüllt
"Ain't No Sunshine"	2006	Yvonne Catterfeld	Come Together – A Tribute to BRAVO
"Better Than Christmas"	2007	Yvonne Catterfeld, Till Brönner	The Christmas Album
"Immer wieder geht die Sonne auf"	2014	Yvonne Catterfeld	Mitten im Leben – Das Tribute Album
"Almost There"	2014	Yvonne Catterfeld	I Love Disney
"Auf uns"	2015	Sing meinen Song Allstars	Sing meinen Song – Das Tauschkonzert Vol. 2
"Geweint vor Glück"	2015	Yvonne Catterfeld	Sing meinen Song – Das Tauschkonzert Vol. 2
"Hey"	2015	Yvonne Catterfeld	Sing meinen Song – Das Tauschkonzert Vol. 2
"Küssen verboten"/"Alles mit'm Mund"	2015	Yvonne Catterfeld	Sing meinen Song – Das Tauschkonzert Vol. 2
"L.M.A.A."	2015	Yvonne Catterfeld	Sing meinen Song – Das Tauschkonzert Vol. 2
"Winter Wunderland"	2015	Yvonne Catterfeld	Giraffenaffen 4 – Winterzeit
"Omen und Orakel"	2015	Yvonne Catterfeld, Xavier Naidoo	Symphonic Rilke Projekt – Dir zur Feier
"Bad, Bad Leroy Brown"	2015	Yvonne Catterfeld, Roger Cicero	Cicero Sings Sinatra – Live in Hamburg
"Cheek to Cheek"	2015	Yvonne Catterfeld, Roger Cicero	Cicero Sings Sinatra – Live in Hamburg
"Something Stupid"	2015	Yvonne Catterfeld, Roger Cicero	Cicero Sings Sinatra – Live in Hamburg
"Hark the Herald Angels Sing"	2015	Yvonne Catterfeld	Sing meinen Song – Das Weihnachtskonzert Vol. 2
"Let It Snow"	2015	Yvonne Catterfeld	Sing meinen Song – Das Weihnachtskonzert Vol. 2

== Music videos ==
List of music videos, showing year released and director(s)
Title	Year	Director(s)
"Bum"	2001	Hasko Baumann
"Komm zurück zu mir"	2001	Peter Pippig
"Niemand sonst"	2002	Robert Bröllochs
"Gefühle"	2003	Thomas Job
"Für dich"	2003	Robert Bröllochs
"Du bist nicht allein"	2003	Robert Bröllochs
"Du hast mein Herz gebrochen"	2004	Robert Bröllochs
"Du bleibst immer noch du"	2004	Robert Bröllochs
"Sag mir – Was meinst du?"	2004	Robert Bröllochs
"Glaub an mich"	2005	Oliver Sommer
"Eine Welt ohne dich"	2005	Daniel Lwowski
"Where Does the Love Go?"	2006	Marcus Sternberg
"Erinner mich, dich zu vergessen"	2006	Daniel Siegler, Dennis Karsten
"Die Zeit ist reif"	2007	Daniel Siegler
"Blau im Blau"	2010	Joern Heitmann
"Pendel"	2013	Christian Schwochow
"Irgendwas"	2016	Unknown
"Guten Morgen Freiheit"	2017	Ramon Rigoni
"Was bleibt"	2017	Unknown
"Patience"	2021	Randolph Herbst
"Back in July"	2021	Randolph Herbst
"Wake Up"	2021	Xandi Kindermann
"Move"	2024	Xandi Kindermann
"In Between"	2024	Xandi Kindermann
"Hands on Me"	2025	Xandi Kindermann, Maximilian Fesenmayer
