= Lieber so (song) =

Single by Yvonne Catterfeld

from the album Lieber so
- Released: 22 November 2013
- Length: 3:39
- Label: Polydor; Island
- Songwriter(s): Marcus Brosch; Katharina Löwel
- Producer(s): Roland Spremberg

Yvonne Catterfeld singles chronology
"Pendel" (2013)	"Lieber so" (2013)	"Irgendwas" (2016)

"Lieber so" (German for: Better This Way) is a song by German recording artist Yvonne Catterfeld, recorded for her same-titled sixth studio album (2013). It was written by Marcus Brosch and Katharina "Kitty Kat" Löwel and produced by Roland Spremberg. A melancholic folk pop ballad, the song's lyrics revolve around the breakdown of a relationship with the female protagonist expressing her love for a man whom she attempts to leave. The instrumentation of "Lieber so" includes an acoustic guitar, a cello and a glockenspiel.

Released as the album's second single in support of the album's reissue release in 2015, "Lieber so" debuted at number 23 on the German Singles Chart based on downloads alone, following her performance of the second season of reality television series Sing meinen Song - Das Tauschkonzert, the German version of The Best Singers series. In August, Catterfeld chose "Lieber so" to represent Thuringia in the Bundesvision Song Contest 2015, eventually placing third in the contest with 114 points.

== Music video ==
A music video for "Lieber so" was filmed at the Hafenklang Studios in Hamburg following the surprise public interest in the song following her performance on Sing meinen Song - Das Tauschkonzert. Producer Roland Spremberg appears in the simple performance video. It was premiered online on 21 May 2015.

== Charts ==
Weekly chart performance for "Lieber so"
Chart (2013)	Peak position
Austria (Ö3 Austria Top 40)	32
Germany (GfK)	23
Switzerland (Schweizer Hitparade)	44
