= Du bleibst immer noch du =

Single by Yvonne Catterfeld

from the album Meine Welt
- Released: 31 May 2004
- Length: 3:51
- Label: Hansa; BMG
- Songwriters: A.C. Ademy; Yvonne Catterfeld; Christoph Leis-Bendorff
- Producer: Christoph Leis-Bendorff

Yvonne Catterfeld singles chronology
"Du hast mein Herz gebrochen" (2004)	"Du bleibst immer noch du" (2004)	"Sag mir – Was meinst du?" (2004)

"Du bleibst immer noch du" (English: You Still Remain Yourself) is a song by German singer Yvonne Catterfeld. The ballad was written by Catterfeld, Walter "A.C. Ademy" Böhringer, and Christoph Leis-Bendorff for Catterfeld's second studio album, Farben meiner Welt (2004), and produced by Leis-Bendorff. The song was released by Hansa Records as the album's second single.

== Music video ==
Catterfeld reteamed with Robert Bröllochs to film a music video for "Du bleibst immer noch du."

== Track listings ==
CD maxi single
No.	Title	Writer(s)	Producer(s)	Length
1.	"Du bleibst immer noch du" (Radio Mix)	Yvonne Catterfeld; A.C. Ademy; Christoph Leis-Bendorff	Leis-Bendorff	3:27
2.	"Du bleibst immer noch du" (Pop Mix)	Catterfeld; Ademy; Leis-Bendorff	Leis-Bendorff	3:38
3.	"Du bleibst immer noch du" (Grand Piano Mix)	Catterfeld; Ademy; Leis-Bendorff	Leis-Bendorff	3:46
4.	"Du bleibst immer noch du" (Instrumental Mix)	Catterfeld; Ademy; Leis-Bendorff	Leis-Bendorff	3:37
5.	"Wahre Helden"	Götz von Sydow; Ralf Hildenbeutel	von Sydow	4:00

== Credits and personnel ==
Credits taken from the Farben einer Welt liner notes.

- A.C. Ademy – writer
- Lothar Atwell – choir
- Yvonne Catterfeld – vocals, writer
- Madeleine Hettwer – choir
- Billy King – choir
- Christoph Leis-Bendorff – choir, guitar, producer, writer
- Anya Mahnken – choir
- Marion Welch – choir

== Charts ==
Weekly chart performance for "Du bleibst immer noch du"
Chart (2004)	Peak position
Austria (Ö3 Austria Top 40)	30
Germany (GfK)	21
Switzerland (Schweizer Hitparade)	53
