= Gefühle =

Single by Yvonne Catterfeld

from the album Meine Welt
- Released: 19 December 2002
- Length: 3:38
- Label: Hansa
- Songwriters: Klaus Hirschburger; Mirko von Schlieffen; Achim Jannsen; Manfred Thiers
- Producers: Jannsen; von Schlieffen; Thiers

Yvonne Catterfeld singles chronology
| "Niemand sonst" (2002) | "Gefühle" (2002) | "Für dich" (2003) |

"Gefühle" (English: Feelings) is a song by German singer Yvonne Catterfeld, recorded for her debut studio album Meine Welt (2003). It was written by Klaus Hirschburger, Mirko von Schlieffen, Achim Jannsen, and Manfred Thiers, while production was helmed by von Schlieffen, Jannsen, and Thiers. A mid-tempo ballad, the song was selected as the third single to be lifted from Meine Welt (2003).

== Music video ==
The music video for "Gefühle" was directed by Thomas Job.

== Track listings ==
CD maxi single
| No. | Title | Length |
|---|---|---|
| 1. | "Gefühle" (Video Edit) | 3:38 |
| 2. | "Gefühle" (Instrumental) | 3:40 |

== Charts ==
Weekly chart performance for "Gefühle"
| Chart (2002–03) | Peak position |
|---|---|
| Germany (GfK) | 26 |
