= Lotte Hass =

Austrian pioneering diver and underwater photographer

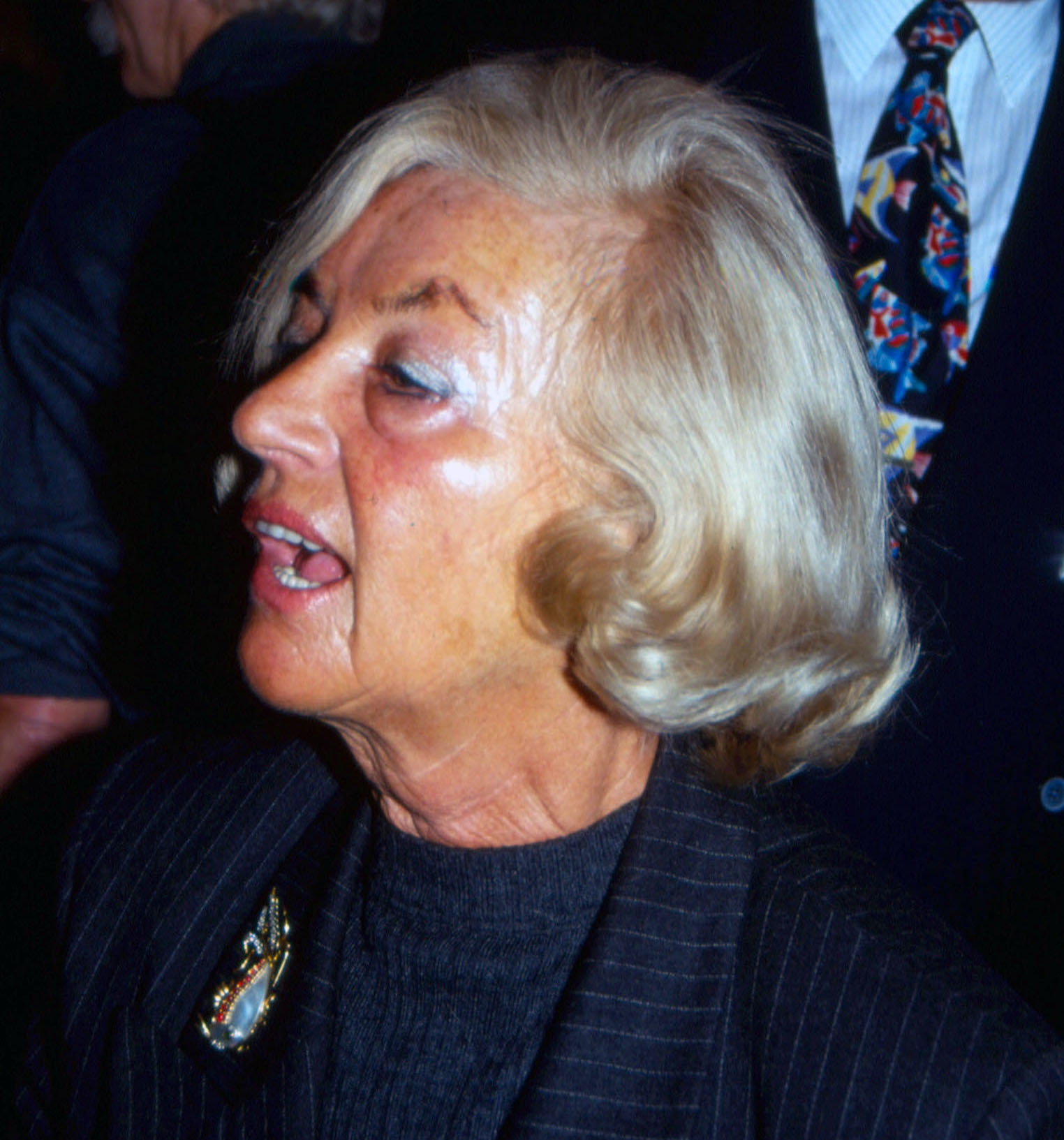
- Lotte Hass in 2004
- Born: Charlotte Hildegard Baierl; 6 November 1928; Vienna, Austria
- Died: 14 January 2015 (aged 86); Vienna, Austria
- Other names: First Lady of Diving; Lottie Berl; Lotte Bayerl
- Known for: Diving; Underwater photography
- Spouses: Hans Hass (m. 1950; died 2013)
- Children: 1

Lotte Hass (6 November 1928 – 14 January 2015) was a pioneering Austrian diver, underwater photographer and model. She was nicknamed The First Lady of Diving. She was the first woman to dive in the Red Sea, the first woman to dive with autonomous diving equipment and the first underwater model. She was also the first person to take “in-water footage” of whale sharks and manta rays. She was married to Hans Hass, the Austrian biologist and fellow diving pioneer.

== Personal life ==
Born Charlotte Hildegard Baierl in Vienna to father Karl Baierl and mother Stefanie, née Kitzmantel, she attended Wenzgasse School. In around 1947, rather than go to university, she applied for and got the job of secretary to biologist and diving pioneer, Hans Hass (1919–2013), at the International Institute of Submarine Research in Vienna.

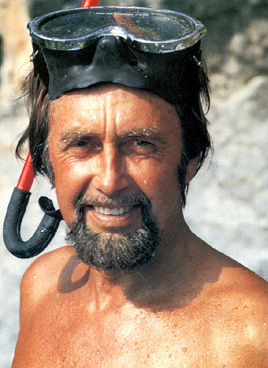
Hans Hass, Lotte’s husband

Hans’ marriage to actress Hannelore Schroth ended in April 1950. He proposed to Lotte in November of the same year in Cairo, while returning to Austria after filming in the Red Sea. Their civil wedding was held on 29 November 1950 in Küsnacht on Lake Zurich.

In the 1950s, Hass received several film offers from Hollywood but turned them all down because she wanted to continue supporting her husband in his research. After the birth of their daughter, Meta, in 1958, Hass largely retired from public life. Hass and Hans eventually held a church wedding in February 1963 at the Augustinian Church in Vienna.

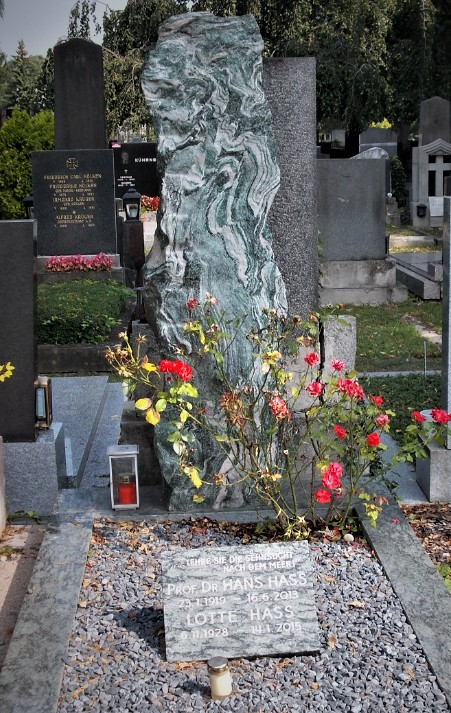
Grave of Hans and Lotte Hass, Vienna

== Diving career ==
When Lotte Baierl joined the International Institute of Submarine Research she “implored” Hans Hass to let her join his next diving expedition. He refused, believing a research ship to be no place for a woman. He felt that her presence would be certain to “make things tricky.” While Hass was away on a lecture tour, she learnt to dive and to take underwater photographs, receiving training from Hass’ assistant, Kurt Schaefer. Some of her early photographs taken under the Danube were published in Wiener Illustrierte. Of her photos Hass said, “Not bad... if you were a man, I could make use of you... pity.”

=== The Red Sea ===
In 1949 she joined Hass’ crew as a secretary for a six-month expedition to shoot a documentary about the Red Sea. While there she learned to use the Drager closed circuit rebreather. Two things happened on the trip that accelerated her diving career. Firstly, the company Sascha-Film who were producing the documentary, decided that the film would appeal to a wider audience with the inclusion of an attractive female lead. Secondly, while testing the diving gear in the Port Sudan hotel pool, the expedition’s cameraman collapsed from the heat and was removed from the team. Lotte, having proved herself to be “cool and courageous with diving apparatus” took his place. During dives with Hass, she continued to act as his secretary, taking notes with a stylus on wax “sitting calmly on a rock, several fathoms down.”

The resulting documentary Abenteuer in Roten Meer was released in 1950 with Lotte starring under her maiden name. It won the international prize for Best Documentary at the Venice Film Festival. It was released as Under the Red Sea, with English narration by Les Tremayne in 1952. Of her Lottie Hass’ diving career, Leslie Leaney, the publisher of Journal of Diving History, wrote that during the 1950s, “it is unlikely that any single lady had more influence in getting people in the water than Lotte did.”

=== Xarifa expeditions ===
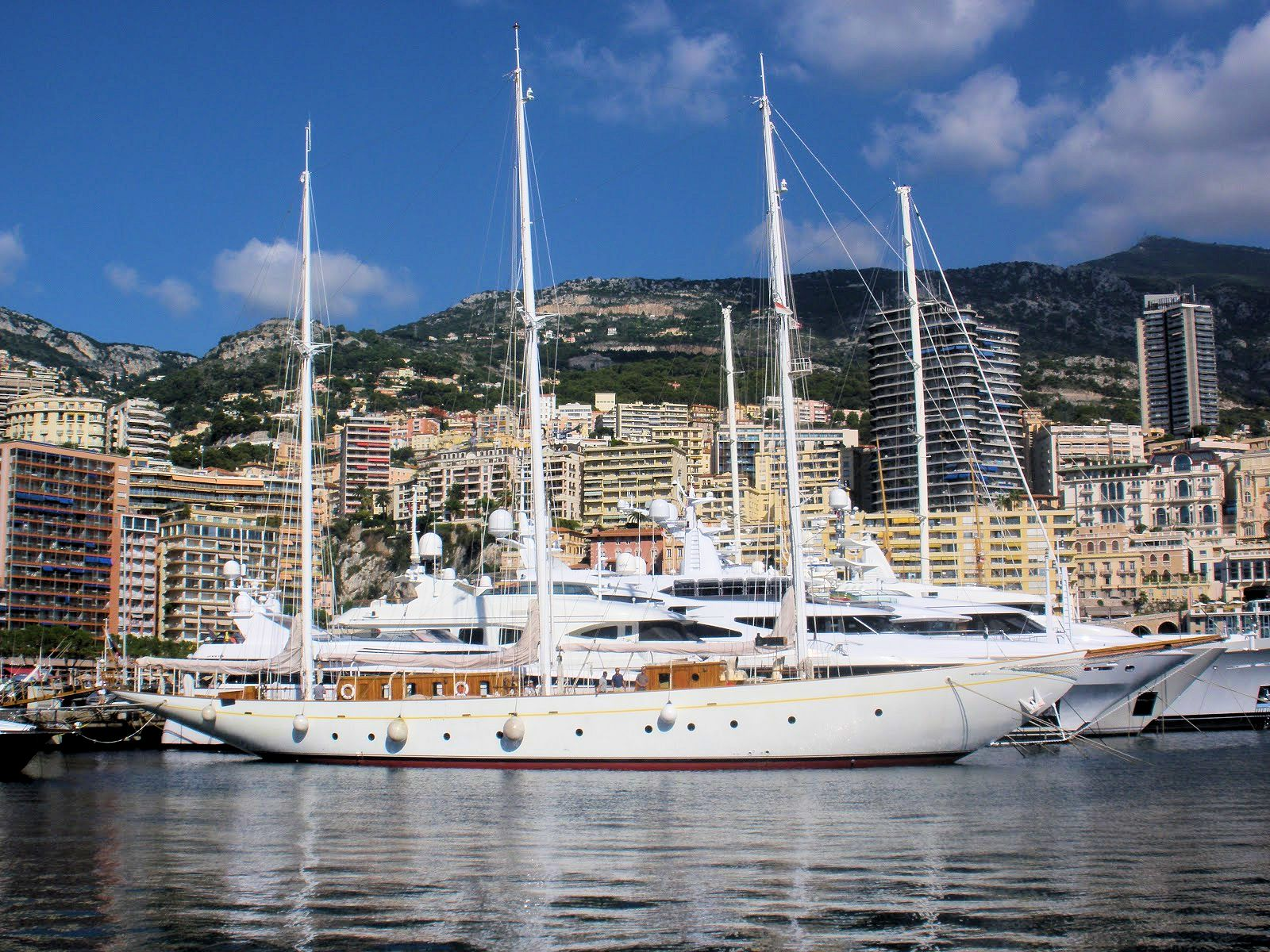
Xarifa moored in Monaco, 2007

Xarifa (Schiff), a three-masted schooner, was her husband’s research ship. (Xarifa means “The beautiful one” in Arabic.) In the 1950s, Lottie, now using her married name of Hass, joined expeditions to Sri Lanka, the Nicobar Islands and islands of Malaysia, working both in front of and behind the camera.

A 1953–54 expedition to the Caribbean Sea and Pacific Ocean resulted in the documentary Unternehmen Xarifa, released in English as “Under the Caribbean”. Hass was unable to join part of a subsequent 1957-8 expedition because she was pregnant, so she asked the on-board zoologist Wolfgang Klausewitz to name a new species of fish in her honour. He chose a whitecap goby, naming it Lotilia graciliosa, Lotilia meaning “belonging to Lotte.”

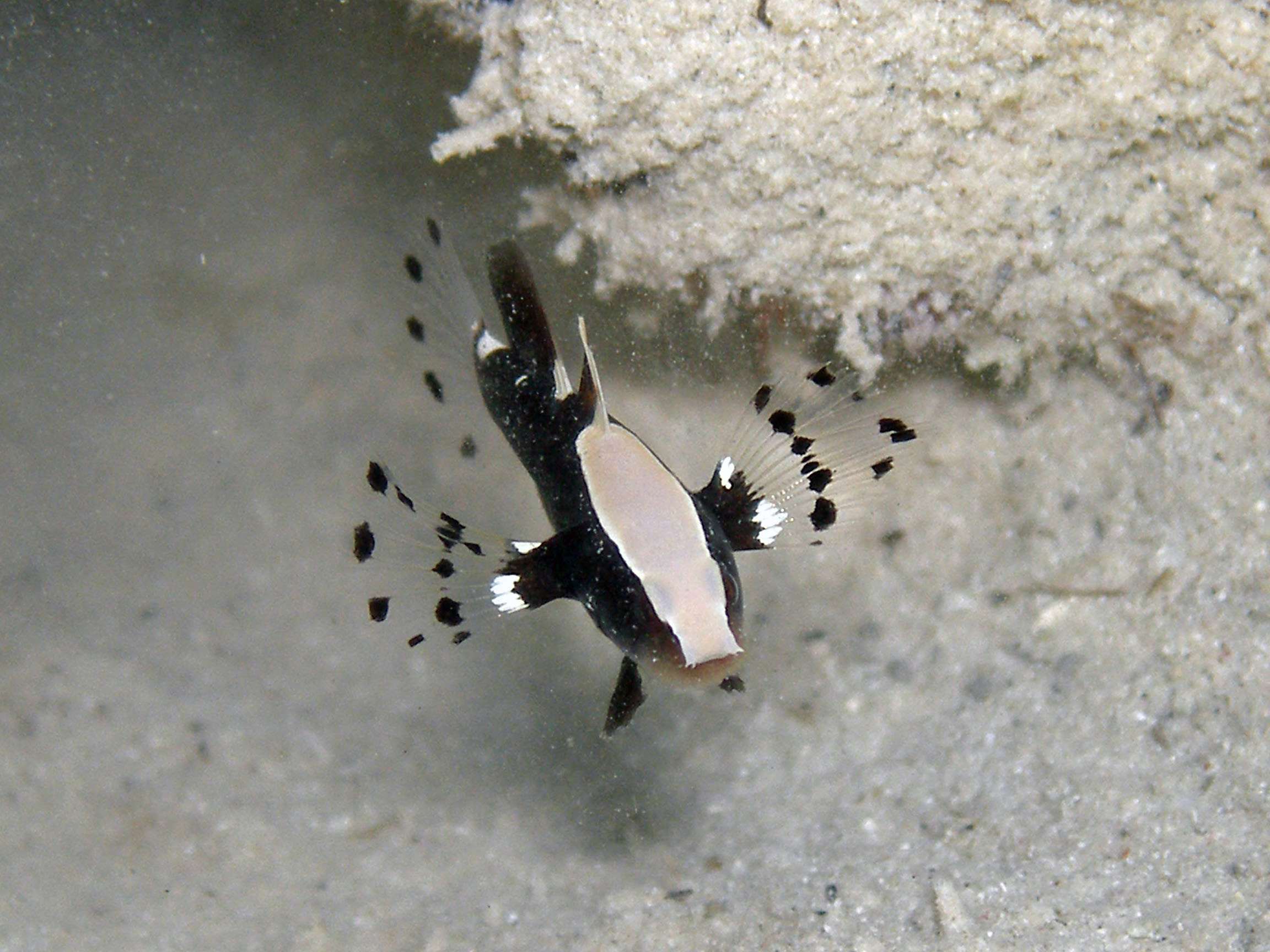
Lotilia graciliosa, named in Hass’ honour

== Film and TV ==
Hans made over 100 films between 1948 and 1960, with Hass appearing in, and later producing “almost all of them” including:

- Abenteuer in Roten Meer (1951)
- Diving to Adventure (1956) a BBC series where Hass and Hans sailed the Red Sea, the Caribbean Sea and the Aegean Sea on Xarifa
- Expedition ins Unbekannte (The Undersea World of Adventure) (1958) a 26-part TV programme made for Sünfunk Stuttgart (SDR) and BBC. Hass was only able to join the latter part of this expedition, from Colombo to Sri Lanka, once her daughter had been born.

In 1976, she had a supporting role, playing the character Frau Parenge, in episode 29 (The Man from Portofino) of the German detective series Derrick (TV series)

== Autobiography ==
In 1970, Hass published her autobiography, Das Mädchen auf dem Meeresgrund: Die Geschichte der Tauchpioniere Lotte und Hans Hass. It was translated into English by Robin Sawyers as A Girl on the Ocean Floor in 1972, with a Polish version in 1976 and an Italian version in 2019. In 2001 it was turned into a film starring Yvonne Catterfeld and Benjamin Sadler, winning Best TV Cinematography award at the Austrian Romy TV awards. The book was also referenced in Juli Zeh’s 2012 novel Nullzeit (Compression).

== Awards and honours ==
- 1989 - IADS-Lifetime Achievement Award from International Association of Diving Schools (USA)
- 1997 – Joined the advisory board of the Historical Diving Society of the USA
- 1997 – Historical Diver Pioneer Magazine Pioneer Award (USA)
- 1998 – HDS Hans and Lotte Hass Film Festival
- 1999 – Trevor Norton dedicated his book Stars Beneath the Sea: The Extraordinary Lives of the Pioneers of Diving to Lotte and Hans Hass
- 2000 – Inducted into the Women Divers Hall of Fame
- 2006 – Beneath the Sea Legends Award (USA)
- 2009 – Gold plaque from Verband Deutscher Sporttaucher (Association of German Sport Divers)
- 2012 – Romy Platinum Award for her life’s work
- 2013 – Inducted into International Scuba Diving Hall of Fame
- 2018 – A street in Vienna was renamed Lotte Hass Weg

== Other reading ==
- Jung, Michael Lotte Hass: A Pictorial Biography The Journal of Diving History, Vol. 16. Issue 3, Summer 2008
- Cardone, Bonnie Women Pioneers in Diving Historical Diver, No. 9, Fall 1996, p20-25
