= Sophie – Braut wider Willen =

- Genre: Telenovela
- Created by: Monica Simon
- Written by: Cornelia Deil-Sanoh
- Country of origin: Germany
- Original language: German
- No. of seasons: 1
- No. of episodes: 65

Production
- Executive producers: Edmund Prylinski; Rainer Wemcken
- Producer: Andrea Nedelmann
- Production locations: Berlin, Germany
- Running time: 25 minutes
- Production company: Grundy UFA TV Produktions GmbH

Original release
- Network: Das Erste
- Release: 8 November 2005 – 9 March 2006

Sophie – Braut wider Willen (Sophie - Reluctant Bride) is a German melodramatic Telenovela set in the 19th century. Yvonne Catterfeld stars as the central character of Countess Sophie. A tale of a forbidden love and intrigue in a Germany of past times. The series premiered on 8 November 2005 on Das Erste. However, after it never matched the networks' expectations, the show was canceled after the episode on 9 March 2006.

== Background ==
Telenovela produced by the Grundy UFA TV Produktions GmbH in the studios in Berlin-Adlershof, as well as Verliebt in Berlin was. In two studios and a purpose-built for the outdoor shoot telenovela hall of 1,400 square meters was created in just three months, a whole different world: A total of 2,600 square meters housed 24 different venues, including a complete historic market square and a castle ruin. Alone in the field of equipment props were partly culled across Europe to replicate the creation of the bourgeois and aristocratic world of the past century. We can therefore speak of the elaborate production of a German telenovela.

The sequence number of the series should be, depending on the success to move from 65 to 130 episodes. The market share remained below expectations and so it came to a happy end after 65 episodes.

== Action ==
The soap opera plays in the second half of the 19th Century.

The young aristocrat Sophie von Ahlen visits to illicit a civil wedding in an urban inn and falls head over heels in there Max Grebe, the son of a seamstress. To avoid being detected, they are made, however, as a maid named Johanna. See later, the two again, and as Max a job as administrator of the estate who accepts from Ahlen, he learns of Sophie's true origin. But since he is disappointed by Sophie lie, the love of the two seems to have no future.

For the industrialist Friedrich Hartstein tried - with the help of his henchman Hans Stallkamp and the gamblers and therefore financially dependent on it Baron Wolfgang von der Fohl - ascend into the aristocratic circles of the city when he applied for membership in a feudal cigarette club. Count Otto von Ahlen, Sophie's father, is the only one to vote against the membership and thus prevents Hartenstein's inclusion in the club. In revenge, Hartenstein ruined with a crafty move on the winery and plays as the ultimate savior. He confesses to Sophie's (honest) can finally love and marry into the family.

But now his ex-mistress, Baroness Valerie Viethoff, knows the exact background and it manages to tell Sophie to front on her wedding night with Frederick the whole truth. This is outraged and tries to flee. The Count of Ahlen is suspicious and slowly begins to investigate. When he does speak for Hartstein, sends him after Hans, who pushes him from the staircase, so that the count breaks his neck. Sophie tries again to escape, but she has no chance of Frederick finds with Lotte in sewing, she pulls back and locks it in his city office. Max finds out and keeps his gun at Frederick. The moment he learns that Frederick is his unprecedented, real father. He lowers the gun, a shot is fired.

Valerie has killed Frederick. Whose hand Langerhans avenges the murder directly, by Valerie suffocated. Max and Sophie are also saved and Sophie's Aunt Marge has nothing more to a wedding. Even Max's friend Benedict, who moved in the meantime for Max in the war, returns and marries Sophie's maid Rike.

== See also ==
- List of German television series
