= Under the Red Sea =

1952 film directed by Hans Hass

- Directed by: Hans Hass
- Written by: Bill Park
- Produced by: Sol Lesser; Hans Hass
- Narrated by: Les Tremayne
- Cinematography: Hans Hass; Lottie Berl
- Edited by: Robert Leo
- Music by: Bert Grund
- Production companies: Thalia Productions; RKO Radio Pictures
- Distributed by: RKO Radio Pictures
- Release date: October 2, 1952 (US)
- Running time: 67 minutes
- Countries: Austria; United States
- Language: English

Under the Red Sea is the 1952 English-language version of a 1951 Austrian documentary film Abenteuer in Roten Meer about the attempts of Austrian marine biologist Hans Hass to record the sounds of marine animals in the Red Sea. It was co-produced by Thalia Productions and RKO Radio Pictures, which released the film on October 2, 1952. The film was narrated by Les Tremayne and starred Lotte Hass.

A book credited to Hans Hass was published in 1953, translated into English by James Cleugh.
