= Move (Yvonne Catterfeld album) =

Studio album by Yvonne Catterfeld
- Released: 7 March 2025
- Length: 30:27
- Label: Seven.One Starwarch

Yvonne Catterfeld chronology
Change (2021)	Move (2025)

Change is the ninth studio album by German recording artist Yvonne Catterfeld. It was released by Vertiable Records and Seven.One Starwarch on 7 March 2025. It marked Catterfeld's second English language album after Change (2021).

== Critical reception ==
Professional ratings
Review scores
Source	Rating
laut.de	3/5 stars
Plattentests	4/10

laut.de editor Philipp Kause found that Move offers polished but mostly unadventurous EDM-pop, driven by smooth melodies, warm production, and a cohesive overall sound. Although he praised songs such as "Chaos In My Head" and "In Between," he argued that the album lacks innovation and truly compelling dance grooves, ultimately describing it as "the perfect soundtrack for good vibes and positive energy” for listeners who enjoy uncomplicated pop music." Plattentests critic Lena Zschirpe felt that the album relies on generic pop and R&B elements that feel interchangeable and quickly forgettable. While acknowledging Catterfeld's vocal talent, she argued that the production and lyrics offer little distinction or emotional depth, concluding that the album ultimately "moves in circles" rather than presenting clear artistic direction.

== Chart performance ==
Change debuted and peaked at number 18 on the German Albums Chart in the week of 14 March 2025 and fell out of the chart in its second week. It marked Catterfeld's highest-charting album since Guten Morgen Freiheit (2017).

== Track listing ==
Move track listing
No.	Title	Length
1.	"Move"	2:25
2.	"Hands On Me"	2:12
3.	"In Between"	2:21
4.	"Lift Me Up"	2:56
5.	"Rock You"	2:50
6.	"Rather Be Alone"	2:47
7.	"The Way I Love You"	2:11
8.	"Get Up"	2:36
9.	"Wanna Dance"	2:26
10.	"Why Don't Ya"	2:56
11.	"Chaos in My Head"	2:26
12.	"Easy Does It"	2:15
Total length:		30:27

== Charts ==
Weekly chart performance for Move
Chart (2025)	Peak position
German Albums (Offizielle Top 100)	18

== Release history ==
Move release history
Region	Date	Format(s)	Label(s)	Ref.
Various	7 March 2026	Digital download; CD; streaming	Veritable; Seven.One Starwarch	
