= Sag mir – Was meinst du? =

Single by Yvonne Catterfeld

from the album Farben meiner Welt
- Released: 4 October 2004
- Length: 2:53
- Label: Hansa; BMG
- Songwriter(s): Vinny Vero; Yvonne Catterfeld; Carl Sahlin; Peter Modén; Peter Ledin; Kerima Holm; Björn Wiese; Britta A. Blum
- Producer(s): Hearsay

Yvonne Catterfeld singles chronology
"Du bleibst immer noch du" (2004)	"Sag mir – Was meinst du?" (2004)	"Glaub an mich" (2005)

"Sag mir – Was meinst du?" (English: Tell Me – What Do You Mean?) is a song by German recording artist Yvonne Catterfeld. Initially titled "I Believe", it was written by Vinny Vero, Carl Sahlin, Peter Modén, Peter Ledin, and Kerima Holm, while production was helmed by Hearsay for Multiplay Music. Catterfeld re-wrote the in German along with Björn Wiese and Britta A. Blum.

== Music video ==
Catterfeld reteamed with Robert Bröllochs to film a music video for "Sag mir – Was meinst du?."

== Track listings ==
CD maxi single
No.	Title	Length
1.	"Sag mir – Was meinst du?" (radio version)	2:53
2.	"Sag mir – Was meinst du?" (Hearsay R'n'b Mix)	3:28
3.	"Sag mir – Was meinst du?" (extended version)	3:29
4.	"I Believe" (original version)	3:12
5.	"Sag mir – Was meinst du?" (instrumental)	3:08

== Charts ==
Weekly chart performance for "Sag mir – Was meinst du?"
Chart (2004)	Peak position
Austria (Ö3 Austria Top 40)	21
Germany (GfK)	14
Switzerland (Schweizer Hitparade)	39
