= Für dich (song) =

Single by Yvonne Catterfeld

from the album Meine Welt
- Released: 5 May 2003
- Length: 4:28
- Label: Hansa
- Songwriter(s): Dieter Bohlen; Klaus Hirschburger; Lukas Hilbert
- Producer(s): Dieter Bohlen

Yvonne Catterfeld singles chronology
"Gefühle" (2003)	"Für dich" (2003)	"Du hast mein Herz gebrochen" (2004)

"Für dich" (English: For You) is a song by German singer Yvonne Catterfeld. It was written by Dieter Bohlen, Klaus Hirschburger and Lukas Hilbert and the produced by the former for her debut studio album, Meine Welt (2003). The ballad was released on 5 May 2003 as the album's fourth single and became a chart topper in Austria, Germany, and Switzerland.

== Chart performance ==
"Für dich" was the fourth single from Meine Welt to precede the album, following "Komm zurück zu mir" (2001) and "Niemand sonst" (2002), both of which were released under Catterfeld's surname, as well as "Gefühle" (2002). The song became her breakthrough single as well as one of the biggest-selling songs of the year, reaching number one in Austria, Germany, and Switzerland. Her biggest-selling single, "Für dich" was certified Platinum by the Bundesverband Musikindustrie (BVMI) and reached Gold status in Austria and Switzerland, respectively.

== Music video ==
The music video for "Für dich" was directed by Robert Bröllochs.

== Track listings ==
All tracks produced by Dieter Bohlen.

CD maxi single
No.	Title	Writer(s)	Length
1.	"Für dich" (full version)	Dieter Bohlen; Klaus Hirschburger; Lukas Hilbert	4:28
2.	"If You" (Instrumental)	Bohlen	3:45
3.	"Für dich" (Instrumental)	Bohlen	3:45

== Charts ==
=== Weekly charts ===
Weekly chart performance for "Für dich"
Chart (2003)	Peak position
Austria (Ö3 Austria Top 40)	1
Germany (GfK)	1
Switzerland (Schweizer Hitparade)	1

=== Year-end charts ===
Year-end chart performance for "Für dich"
Chart (2003)	Position
Austria (Ö3 Austria Top 40)	11
Germany (Media Control GfK)	3
Switzerland (Schweizer Hitparade)	9

== Certifications ==
Certifications for "Für dich"
Region	Certification	Certified units/sales
Austria (IFPI Austria)	Gold	15,000^{*}
Germany (BVMI)	Platinum	300,000^{^}
Switzerland (IFPI Switzerland)	Gold	20,000^{^}
^{*} Sales figures based on certification alone.^{^} Shipments figures based on certification alone.
