= Guten Morgen Freiheit =

Studio album by Yvonne Catterfeld
- Released: 10 March 2017
- Length: 43:17
- Label: Veritable
- Producer: Beatgees; Greatest Kidz

Yvonne Catterfeld chronology
| Lieber so (2013) | Guten Morgen Freiheit (2017) | Change (2021) |

Singles from Guten Morgen Freiheit
- 1. "Irgendwas" Released: 9 December 2016; 2. "Was bleibt" Released: 3 February 2017; 3. "Besser werden" Released: 10 February 2017; 4. "Freisprengen" Released: 17 February 2017; 5. "Tür und Angel" Released: 24 February 2017; 6. "Guten Morgen Freiheit" Released: 3 March 2017

Guten Morgen Freiheit (Good Morning Freedom) is the seventh studio album by German recording artist Yvonne Catterfeld. Released on 10 March 2017, it marked Catterfeld's debut release with her independent record company Veritable Records following her departure from Columbia Records. Her highest-charting album since Unterwegs (2005), it debuted at number four on the Austrian and German Albums Chart, respectively, and peaked at number seven in Switzerland.

== Track listing ==
Guten Morgen Freiheit track listing
| No. | Title | Writer(s) | Length |
|---|---|---|---|
| 1. | "Guten Morgen Freiheit" | Alexander Freund; Sera Finale | 3:24 |
| 2. | "Irgendwas" (featuring Bengio) | Ben-Giacomo Wortmann; Matteo Capreoli | 3:33 |
| 3. | "Was bleibt" | Catterfeld; Michael Kurth; Tom Olbrich | 2:42 |
| 4. | "Besser werden" | Catterfeld; Freund; Finale | 2:57 |
| 5. | "Tür und Angel" (featuring Chima) | Beatgees; Chima Onyele; Fabian Römer | 3:30 |
| 6. | "Freisprengen" | Beatgees; Onyele; Römer | 2:57 |
| 7. | "Schwarz auf weiß" | Catterfeld; Freund | 2:35 |
| 8. | "5 vor 12" (featuring Teesy) | Toni Mudrack | 3:36 |
| 9. | "Mehr als ihr seht (Pt. 1)" | Catterfeld; Onyele; Peter Jordan; Konrad Sommermeyer | 3:09 |
| 10. | "Scheinriesen" | Ali Zuckowski; David Jürgens; Peter Schanowski | 2:46 |
| 11. | "Straßen aus Salz" | Alina Wichmann; Jen Bender; Michael Schlücker; Raphael Schalz | 3:28 |
| 12. | "Mehr als ihr seht (Pt. 2)" (featuring MoTrip) | Catterfeld; Beatgees; Onyele; Jordan; Motrip; Sommermeyer | 4:01 |
| 13. | "Naftali" | Catterfeld | 1:26 |
| 14. | "Pass gut auf dich auf" | Freund; Finale | 3:13 |
| Total length: | | | 43:17 |

== Charts ==
Weekly chart performance for Guten Morgen Freiheit
| Chart (2017) | Peak position |
|---|---|
| Austrian Albums (Ö3 Austria) | 4 |
| German Albums (Offizielle Top 100) | 4 |
| Swiss Albums (Schweizer Hitparade) | 7 |

== Release history ==
Guten Morgen Freiheit release history
| Region | Date | Format(s) | Label(s) |
|---|---|---|---|
| Various | 10 March 2017 | Digital download; CD | Veritable |
