= Lieber so =

Studio album by Yvonne Catterfeld
- Released: 22 November 2013
- Length: 44:02
- Labels: Columbia; Sony Music
- Producer: Roland Spremberg

Yvonne Catterfeld chronology
Blau im Blau (2010)	Lieber so (2013)	Guten Morgen Freiheit (2017)

Lieber so (Better This Way) is the sixth studio album by German recording artist Yvonne Catterfeld, released by Columbia Records and Sony Music on 22 November 2013 in German-speaking Europe. While production of the album was overseen by Roland Spremberg, several musicians contributed to Lieber so, including producers Marcus Brosch and Christian "Crada" Kalla as well as rappers Kitty Kat and Sera Finale, Jennifer Rostock keyboarder Joe Walter, and Swiss pop singer Mia Aegerter.

Upon its release, Lieber so earned mixed to positive reviews from music critics but became a moderate chart success, debuting and peaking at number 14 on the German Albums Chart. A reissue of the album, released in 2015 to accompany Catterfeld's participation in the second season of the reality television series Sing meinen Song - Das Tauschkonzert, the German version of The Best Singers series, surpassed this peak and has since reached number eight in Germany. Also, Lieber so entered the charts in Austria and Switzerland, where it became her highest-charting effort in a decade.

== Critical reception ==
Professional ratings
Review scores
Source	Rating
laut.de	3/5 stars
Hitchecker	4/5 marks

Kai Butterweck editor laut.de rated the album two out of five stars. He found that "the only really new thing is the sound of her voice. Much deeper than usual, the voice indicates a maturing process that fuels hope. Now all that's left is the background. Unfortunately, strained and artificial Winehouse references, no less contrived James Bond excursions and almost embarrassing forays into Silbermond & Co. territory lead to great disillusionment." Hitchecker felt that with a "solid mix of retro soul pop, acoustic chansons and big piano ballads, which is certainly not a coincidence that reminds us of Adele, she is certainly not reinventing the wheel. The wow factor is more her voice, which no longer reaches the heights of a Mariah Carey. The new Catterfeld surprises with a pleasantly deep and warm timbre. It's a good thing that her name is on the CD cover, otherwise you would hardly have recognized her from her singing."

== Chart performance ==
Released on 22 November 2013, Lieber so debuted at number twenty-one on the German Albums Chart in the week of 6 December 2013. It marked Catterfeld's sixth consecutive top forty entry, though it charted significantly higher than Blau im Blau, her fifth album which had peaked at number thirty-seven in 2010. Internationally, Lieber so failed to chart on any foreign music market – her first album to do so in Austria.

Re-released in 2015 to accompany Catterfeld's participation in the second season of the reality television series Sing meinen Song – Das Tauschkonzert, the German version of The Best Singers series, Lieber so re-entered the charts only four days after the broadcast of Catterfeld's episode. Surpassing its initial peak, it opened at number 14 on the German Albums Chart and eventually reached number eight, becoming her highest-charting album since 2005's Unterwegs. Lieber so also made its chart debut in Austria, where it debuted at number 31 on the Ö3 Austria Top 40 and peaked at number 15. In Switzerland, the reissue became Catterfeld's first chart entry in nine years. It peaked at number 20, her highest-charting album since Unterwegs.

== Track listing ==
Lieber so track listing
No.	Title	Writer(s)	Length
1.	"Pendel"	Thomas Dörschel; Johannes Walter-Müller; Alexander Freund	3:27
2.	"Kein Blick zurück"	Roland Spremberg; Steffen Häfelinger	3:35
3.	"Lieber so"	Marcus Brosch; Katharina Löwel	3:39
4.	"Ganz großes Kino"	Spremberg; Sera Finale	3:41
5.	"So viel mehr als Liebe"	Catterfeld; Spremberg; Häfelinger; Justin Balk; Christoph Papendieck; Dörschel	3:37
6.	"Vielleicht ist keine Antwort"	Catterfeld; Häfelinger; Balk; Vassilios Parashidis	2:54
7.	"Amazone"	Catterfeld; Spremberg; Balk	3:40
8.	"Nicht drüber reden"	Walter-Müller; Jonathan Walter; Christian Kalla	3:10
9.	"Jäger der Zeit"	Häfelinger; Mia Aegerter; Chris Buseck	3:42
10.	"Unser Weg"	Catterfeld; Häfelinger	3:06
11.	"Phantomschmerz"	Dörschel; Walter-Müller; Farhot Samadzada	3:26
12.	"Perfekt"	Spremberg; Balk; Tobias Röger	2:59
13.	"Ich bin es nicht"	Spremberg; Balk; Röger	3:06
Total length:			44:02

Lieber so – 2015 reissue (bonus tracks)
No.	Title	Writer(s)	Length
14.	"Meine Mitte"	Florian Sczesny; Peter Trevisan; Spremberg	3:56
15.	"Paarsein"	Balk; Spremberg	2:57
16.	"Soviel mehr als Liebe" (Akustik Live Version)	Catterfeld; Spremberg; Häfelinger; Balk; Papendieck; Dörschel	3:56
17.	"Paarsein" (Akustik Live Version)	Balk; Spremberg	3:40
Total length:			58:33

== Charts ==
Weekly chart performance for Lieber so
Chart (2013–2015)	Peak position
Austrian Albums (Ö3 Austria)	15
German Albums (Offizielle Top 100)	8
Swiss Albums (Schweizer Hitparade)	20

== Certifications ==
Certifications for Lieber so
Region	Certification	Certified units/sales
Germany (BVMI)	Gold	100,000^{‡}
^{‡} Sales+streaming figures based on certification alone.

== Release history ==
Lieber so release history
Region	Date	Format(s)	Label(s)
Various	22 November 2013	Digital download; CD	Columbia; Sony Music
