= Irgendwas =

Single by Yvonne Catterfeld featuring Bengio

from the album Guten Morgen Freiheit
- Released: 9 December 2016
- Genre: Pop
- Length: 3:33
- Label: Veritable
- Songwriter(s): Ben-Giacomo Wortmann, Matteo Capreoli

Yvonne Catterfeld singles chronology
"Lieber so" (2015)	"Irgendwas" (2016)

"Irgendwas" (German: Something) is a song by German recording artist Yvonne Catterfeld, recorded along with Bengio for her seventh studio album Guten Morgen Freiheit (2017). Selected as the album's first single, it was released as a digital download on 9 December 2016. It debuted and peaked at number 27 on the German Singles Chart, becoming her highest-charting lead single since 2006's "Erinner mich, dich zu vergessen".

== Track listing ==
Digital single
No.	Title	Length
1.	"Irgendwas"	3:33

== Charts ==
Chart (2016–17)	Peak position
Austria (Ö3 Austria Top 40)	17
Germany (GfK)	27
Switzerland (Schweizer Hitparade)	41
