= Pendel =

Single by Yvonne Catterfeld

from the album Lieber so
- Released: 8 November 2013
- Length: 3:27
- Label: Polydor; Island
- Songwriter(s): Thomas Dörschel; Johannes Walter-Müller; Alexander Freund
- Producer(s): Roland Spremberg

Yvonne Catterfeld singles chronology
"Blau im Blau" (2010)	"Pendel" (2013)	"Lieber so" (2015)

"Pendel" (English: Pendulum) is a song by German recording artist Yvonne Catterfeld. It was written by Thomas Dörschel, Johannes Walter-Müller, and Alexander Freund and produced by Roland Spremberg for her sixth studio album Lieber so (2013). Built on a hand-clapped rhythm and pulsating beats, the uptempo song's instrumentation consists of soft percussion instruments and a piano. In "Pendel", Catterfeld talk about the changes that come from and may result in fortune, crises, and progress.

== Chart performance ==
Selected as the album's lead single, "Pendel" was released as a digital single in November 2013 and reached number 59 on the German Singles Chart. It marked her lowest-charting single in years.

== Music video ==
An accompanying music video was directed by Christian Schwochow and released on 4 November 2013.

== Track listings ==
Digital single
No.	Title	Writer(s)	Length
1.	"Pendel"	Thomas Dörschel; Johannes Walter-Müller; Alexander Freund	3:27
2.	"Unser Weg"	Steffen Häfelinger; Yvonne Catterfeld	3:04

== Charts ==
Weekly chart performance for "Pendel"
Chart (2013)	Peak position
Germany (GfK)	59
