= Blau im Blau =

Studio album by Yvonne Catterfeld
- Released: 5 March 2010
- Length: 52:05
- Label: Col7one; Sony Music
- Producer: Achille Fonkam

Yvonne Catterfeld chronology
Aura (2006)	Blau im Blau (2010)	Lieber so (2013)

Blau im Blau (Blue in Blue) is the fifth studio album by German recording artist Yvonne Catterfeld, released by Sony Music on 5 March 2010 in German-speaking Europe.

== Track listing ==
Blau im Blau track listing
No.	Title	Writer(s)	Producer(s)	Length
1.	"Intro – Blau im Blau (La la la)"	Beatrice Reszat; Achille Fonkam	Fonkam	0:55
2.	"Zeit"	Reszat; Fonkam	Fonkam	3:21
3.	"Du sagst es nicht"	Reszat; Fonkam	Fonkam	2:55
4.	"Blau im Blau"	Reszat; Fonkam	Fonkam	3:49
5.	"Wind der nicht weht"	Reszat; Fonkam	Fonkam	3:28
6.	"Frag nie warum" (featuring Cassandra Steen)	Reszat; Stevie Wonder; Kenneth Edmonds	Fonkam	5:02
7.	"Immer noch"	Xavier Naidoo; Aiko Rohd	Fonkam	3:33
8.	"Lass mich so wie ich bin"	Reszat; Fonkam	Fonkam	3:33
9.	"Bist du dir sicher"	Catterfeld; Sven Bünger; Oliver Wnuk	Fonkam	3:18
10.	"Traummann"	Catterfeld; Reszat; Fonkam	Fonkam	3:08
11.	"Stille Wasser"	Reszat; Fonkam	Fonkam	3:44
12.	"Träume sind aus Mut gemacht"	Reszat; Fonkam; Nis Kötting	Fonkam	3:19
13.	"Fragen"	Catterfeld; Bünger; Wnuk	Fonkam	4:26
14.	"Wer ich bin"	Fonkam, Wnuk; Kötting	Fonkam	2:40
15.	"December Prayer"	Charlie Midnight; Walter Afanasieff; Idina Menzel	Fonkam	4:54
Total length:				52:05

== Charts ==
Weekly chart performance for Blau im Blau
Chart (2010)	Peak position
Austrian Albums (Ö3 Austria)	44
German Albums (Offizielle Top 100)	37

== Release history ==
Blau im Blau release history
Region	Date	Format(s)	Label(s)
Austria	March 5, 2010	Digital download; CD	Col7one; Sony Music
Germany	March 5, 2010	Digital download; CD	Col7one; Sony Music
Switzerland	March 5, 2010	Digital download; CD	Col7one; Sony Music
