= Niemand sonst =

Single by Yvonne Catterfeld

from the album Meine Welt
- Released: 21 October 2002
- Length: 3:33
- Label: Hansa
- Songwriter(s): Götz von Sydow; Ralf Hildenbeutel
- Producer(s): Schallbau

Yvonne Catterfeld singles chronology
"Komm zurück zu mir" (2001)	"Niemand sonst" (2002)	"Gefühle" (2003)

"Niemand sonst" (English: No One Else) is a song by the German singer Yvonne Catterfeld, recorded for her first album Meine Welt (2003). It was written by Götz von Sydow and Ralf Hildenbeutel and produced by the latter with Matthias Hoffmann and Steffen Britzke under their production name Schallbau. A mid-tempo pop soul track with slight elements of the contemporary R&B genre, it was the second single to precede Meine Welt and reached number 31 on the German Singles Chart.

== Music video ==
The music video for "Niemand sonst" was directed by Robert Bröllochs.

== Track listings ==
All tracks written by Götz von Sydow and Ralf Hildenbeutel.

CD single
No.	Title	Length
1.	"Niemand sonst" (Radio Edit)	3:33
2.	"Niemand sonst" (Extended Version)	4:56
3.	"Niemand sonst" (Instrumental)	3:33
4.	"Niemand sonst" (Backbeat@Bluepm Rmx)	3:42

== Charts ==
Weekly chart performance for "Niemand sonst"
Chart (2002)	Peak position
Germany (GfK)	31
