= Aura (Yvonne Catterfeld album) =

Studio album by Yvonne Catterfeld
- Released: 20 October 2006
- Length: 56:49
- Label: Columbia; Sony Music
- Producer: Walter Afanasieff; Eric Benét; Alex Christensen; Max Herre; Lukas Hilbert; Mousse T.; Lilo Scrimali; OJA Tunes; Jan van der Toorn

Yvonne Catterfeld chronology
Unterwegs (2005)	Aura (2006)	Blau im Blau (2010)

Aura is the fourth studio album by German recording artist Yvonne Catterfeld, released by Sony Music on 20 October 2006 in German-speaking Europe.

== Track listing ==
Aura track listing
No.	Title	Writer(s)	Producer(s)	Length
1.	"Die Zeit ist reif"	Catterfeld; Andy Love; Heike Kospach; Jos Jorgensen; Terry Walker	Mousse T.	3:51
2.	"Ich will nur dich"	Catterfeld; Alan Glass; T. Fraser; T. Blaize; Britta A. Blum	Mousse T.	3:35
3.	"Liebe muss reichen"	Catterfeld; Jan Pelao; Blum; P.O. Block	OJA Tunes	3:43
4.	"Erinner' mich dich zu vergessen"	Lukas Hilbert	Alex Christensen; Lukas Hilbert	3:26
5.	"Hier bin ich"	Catterfeld; Kospach; Pelao; Block	OJA Tunes	3:35
6.	"Neben dir"	Catterfeld; Walter Afanasieff; Hilbert	Afanasieff	4:08
7.	"Mein Tag, mein Licht"	Bill Withers; Lukas Hilbert	Lilo Scrimali	3:22
8.	"Sonnenschein"	Catterfeld; Götz von Sydow; Laith Al-Deen	OJA Tunes	3:56
9.	"Ich lauf einfach los"	Catterfeld; Kospach; Christian Neander	OJA Tunes	3:56
10.	"Diebe der Liebe"	Catterfeld; Nosie Katzmann; Anne Aalrust	Jan van der Toorn	3:21
11.	"Kenn ich dich"	Neander; Tony Cornelissen; Tobias Friedrich; Allan Eshuijs	OJA Tunes	3:40
12.	"Du lässt dich gehen"	Catterfeld; Frank Ramond; Matthias Hass	van der Toorn	3:30
13.	"Schicksal"	Catterfeld; van der Toorn; Kospach; Claus Capek	van der Toorn	3:36
14.	"Alles was du dir erträumst"	Max Herre; Sékou Neblett; Lilo Scrimali; Joy Denalane	Herre; Scrimali	4:34
15.	"Where Does the Love Go" (with Eric Benét)	Benét; Hod David; Andrew Wyatt	Afanasieff; Benét	4:36
Total length:				56:49

== Charts ==
Weekly chart performance for Aura
Chart (2006)	Peak position
Austrian Albums (Ö3 Austria)	17
German Albums (Offizielle Top 100)	10
Swiss Albums (Schweizer Hitparade)	26

== Release history ==
Aura release history
Region	Date	Format(s)	Label(s)
Austria	20 October 2006	Digital download; CD	Columbia; Sony Music
Germany	20 October 2006	Digital download; CD	Columbia; Sony Music
Switzerland	20 October 2006	Digital download; CD	Columbia; Sony Music
