= Du hast mein Herz gebrochen =

Single by Yvonne Catterfeld

from the album Farben meiner Welt
- Language: German
- English title: "You Broke My Heart"
- Released: 12 January 2004
- Length: 3:25
- Label: Hansa; BMG
- Songwriters: Dieter Bohlen; Eko Fresh
- Producer: Dieter Bohlen

Yvonne Catterfeld singles chronology
"Für dich" (2003)	"Du hast mein Herz gebrochen" (2004)	"Du bleibst immer noch du" (2004)

"Du hast mein Herz gebrochen" (English: "You Broke My Heart") is a song by German singer Yvonne Catterfeld. It was written by Dieter Bohlen and Eko Fresh, and produced by the former for Catterfeld's second studio album, Farben meiner Welt (2004).

== Music video ==
A music video for "Du hast mein Herz gebrochen" was directed by Robert Bröllochs.

== Track listing ==
All tracks written by Dieter Bohlen and Eko Fresh; produced by Bohlen.

CD maxi single
No.	Title	Length
1.	"Du hast mein Herz gebrochen"	3:25
2.	"Du hast mein Herz gebrochen" (Acoustic Version)	3:39
3.	"Du hast mein Herz gebrochen" (instrumental)	3:24

== Personnel ==
Personnel are taken from the Farben einer Welt liner notes.

- Arrangement – Lalo Titenkov
- Co-producer – Jeo, Lalo Titenkov
- Artwork – Ronald Reinsberg
- Guitar – Jörg Sander
- Lyrics, music, production – Dieter Bohlen
- Mixing – Jeo

== Charts ==
=== Weekly charts ===
Weekly chart performance for "Du hast mein Herz gebrochen"
Chart (2004)	Peak position
Austria (Ö3 Austria Top 40)	4
Germany (GfK)	1
Switzerland (Schweizer Hitparade)	6

=== Year-end charts ===
Year-end chart performance for "Du hast mein Herz gebrochen"
Chart (2004)	Position
Austria (Ö3 Austria Top 40)	25
Germany (Media Control GfK)	21
Switzerland (Schweizer Hitparade)	49
