= Change (Yvonne Catterfeld album) =

Studio album by Yvonne Catterfeld
- Released: 3 December 2021
- Length: 36:02
- Label: Veritable
- Producer: Hannah V; Truva

Yvonne Catterfeld chronology
Guten Morgen Freiheit (2017)	Change (2021)	Move (2025)

Change is the eighth studio album by German recording artist Yvonne Catterfeld. It was released by Veritable Records on 3 December 2021. Her second full-length release with the independent record company, it marked Catterfeld's first album in English language.

== Critical reception ==
Professional ratings
Review scores
Source	Rating
laut.de	3/5 stars
Plattentests	6/10

laut.de editor Yannik Gölz rated the album three out of five stars. He found that during "the best moments on Change, Catterfeld literally shakes off German pop, does more justice to her inspirations and makes some of the best songs of her career [but] a few of the classic weaknesses of "Change" still remain [...] Ironically, the more the album gets closer to the abstract, big themes, it becomes more and more watered down into nice radio nonsense." Plattentests critic Dominik Steiner felt that "Catterfeld's album is pleasantly simple, without giving in to the temptation to oversimplify everything. A positive surprise from an artist who was unfairly treated as a musical lightweight for a long time."

== Chart performance ==
Change debuted and peaked at number 65 on the German Albums Chart in the week of 10 December 2021 and fell out of the chart in its second week. It marked Catterfeld's lowest-charting album yet.

== Track listing ==
Change track listing
No.	Title	Writer(s)	Producer(s)	Length
1.	"Change"	Yvonne Catterfeld	Hannah V	2:55
2.	"Patience"	Catterfeld; Steven Bashir; Benedikt Schoeller; Timothy Auld; Truva	Truva	2:49
3.	"Back in July"	Catterfeld; Schoeller; Auld	Truva	2:34
4.	"Wake Up"	Catterfeld; Schoeller; Auld	Truva	2:12
5.	"Bullshit"	Catterfeld; Schoeller; Auld	Truva	2:23
6.	"Cold Water"	Catterfeld	Hannah V	3:20
7.	"Words"	Catterfeld; Schoeller; Auld	Truva	2:33
8.	"Tip Toe"	Catterfeld; Schoeller; Auld	Truva	3:24
9.	"Let You Go"	Catterfeld; Schoeller; Auld	Truva	2:52
10.	"I Think I Love You"	Catterfeld; Schoeller; Auld	Truva	2:52
11.	"Broken"	Catterfeld; Schoeller; Auld	Truva	2:27
12.	"Home"	Catterfeld; Schoeller; Auld	Truva	2:30
13.	"Let You Go" (acoustic)	Catterfeld; Schoeller; Auld	Truva	3:05
Total length:				36:02

== Charts ==
Weekly chart performance for Change
Chart (2021)	Peak position
German Albums (Offizielle Top 100)	65

== Release history ==
Change release history
Region	Date	Format(s)	Label(s)	Ref.
Various	3 December 2021	Digital download; CD; streaming	Veritable	
