= Glaub an mich =

2005 single by Yvonne Catterfeld

Single by Yvonne Catterfeld

from the album Unterwegs
- Released: 14 February 2005
- Length: 3:42
- Label: Hansa; BMG
- Songwriters: Steve van Velvet; Yasemin Kaldirim
- Producers: Jeo; Lalo Titenkov

Yvonne Catterfeld singles chronology
"Sag mir – Was meinst du?" (2004)	"Glaub an mich" (2005)	"Eine Welt ohne dich" (2005)

"Glaub an mich" (English: Believe in Me) is a song by German recording artist Yvonne Catterfeld. It was written by Steve van Velvet, Yasemin Kaldirim and produced by Joachim "Jeo" Mezei and Lalo Titenkov for her third studio album Unterwegs (2005). Released by Hansa Records as the album's leading single, it peaked at number three on the German Singles Chart and reached the top in Austria.

== Track listings ==
CD maxi single
No.	Title	Length
1.	"Glaub an mich" (single version)	3:42
2.	"Glaub an mich" (orchester version)	3:42
3.	"Glaub an mich" (R&B remix)	3:38
4.	"Glaub an mich" (instrumental)	3:44

== Credits and personnel ==
Credits taken from the Unterwegs liner notes.

- Madeleine Hettwer – backing vocalist
- Yasemin Kaldirim – writer
- Billy King – choir
- Christoph Leis-Bendorff – backing vocalist
- Anya Mahnken – backing vocalist
- Joachim "Jeo" Mezei – producer
- Lalo Titenkov – producer
- Steve van Velvet – writer

== Charts ==
=== Weekly charts ===
Weekly chart performance for "Glaub an mich"
Chart (2005)	Peak position
Austria (Ö3 Austria Top 40)	6
Germany (GfK)	3
Switzerland (Schweizer Hitparade)	15

=== Year-end charts ===
Year-end chart performance for "Glaub an mich"
Chart (2005)	Position
Austria (Ö3 Austria Top 40)	53
Germany (Media Control GfK)	38
Switzerland (Schweizer Hitparade)	93
