= Unterwegs (album) =

Studio album by Yvonne Catterfeld
- Released: 14 March 2005
- Length: 48:39
- Label: Hansa; BMG
- Producer: Hearsay; Jeo; Peter Ledin; Christoph Leis-Bendorff; Henrik Menzel; Peter Modén; Marek Pompetzki; Dave Roth; Carl Sahlin; Schallbau; Valentin Stilu; Lalo Titenkov

Yvonne Catterfeld chronology
Farben meiner Welt (2004)	Unterwegs (2005)	Aura (2006)

Unterwegs is the third studio album by German recording artist Yvonne Catterfeld, released by Sony Music on 14 March 2005 in German-speaking Europe.

== Track listing ==
Unterwegs track listing
No.	Title	Writer(s)	Producer(s)	Length
1.	"Glaub an mich"	Steve van Velvet; Yasemin Kaldirim	Jeo; Lalo Titenkov	3:42
2.	"Grenzenlos"	Christoph Leis-Bendorff; Rudolf Müssig	Leis-Bendorff	3:39
3.	"Leben lassen"	Götz von Sydow; Ralf Hildenbeutel	Schallbau	4:07
4.	"Unterwegs"	Catterfeld; Britta Arezu Blum; Carl Sahlin; Peter Ledin; Peter Modén; Ronald Johnson; Sandra Tan Mercovich Chammas	Jeo; Sahlin; Ledin; Modén	3:18
5.	"Dreh deine Welt ins Licht"	Catterfeld; Blum; Sahlin; Ledin; Modén; Kerima Holm	Jeo; Sahlin; Ledin; Modén	3:42
6.	"Eine Welt ohne dich"	Catterfeld; van Velvet	Jeo; Lalo Titenkov	3:32
7.	"Sag mir – Was meinst du?" (Hearsay R'n'B Remix)	Catterfeld; Blum; Bjorn Wiese; Sahlin; Ledin; Modén; Holm; Vinny Vero	Hearsay; Jeo	3:29
8.	"Ich halt dich"	Diane Weigmann; Sahlin; Ledin; Modén	Sahlin; Ledin; Modén	3:49
9.	"Als der Herbst kam"	Catterfeld; von Sydow; Hildenbeutel	Schallbau	4:10
10.	"Wieviele Menschen"	Dave Roth; Rebecca Roth; Valentin Stilu	D. Roth; Stilu	3:51
11.	"Licht am Horizont (Sieben Tage)"	Hildenbeutel; von Sydow	Schallbau	3:19
12.	"Als unser Hass noch Liebe war"	van Velvet	Schallbau	3:47
13.	"Zauberwort"	Blum; Paul Holmes; Marek Pompetzki	Henrik Menzel; Pompetzki	3:18
14.	"Superwoman"	Sahlin; Ledin; Modén; Holm	Sahlin; Ledin; Modén	3:06
Total length:				48:39

== Charts ==
=== Weekly charts ===
Weekly chart performance for Unterwegs
Chart (2005)	Peak position
Austrian Albums (Ö3 Austria)	4
German Albums (Offizielle Top 100)	1
Swiss Albums (Schweizer Hitparade)	18

=== Year-end charts ===
Year-end chart performance for Unterwegs
Chart (2005)	Position
German Albums (Offizielle Top 100)	53

== Certifications ==
Certifications for Unterwegs
Region	Certification	Certified units/sales
Germany (BVMI)	Gold	100,000^{^}
^{^} Shipments figures based on certification alone.

== Release history ==
Unterwegs release history
Region	Date	Format(s)	Label(s)
Austria	14 March 2005	Digital download; CD	Hansa; BMG
Germany	14 March 2005	Digital download; CD	Hansa; BMG
Switzerland	14 March 2005	Digital download; CD	Hansa; BMG
