= Hans Hass =

Austrian biologist, film-maker and underwater diving pioneer (1919–2013)

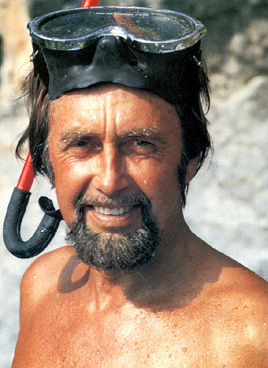
- Born: 23 January 1919; Vienna, Austria
- Died: 16 June 2013 (aged 94)
- Education: University of Berlin
- Occupations: Underwater diver, Documentary filmmaker
- Spouses: Hannelore Schroth (m. 1945–div.1950); Lotte Hass (m. 1950)
- Children: 2
- Scientific career
- Workplaces: Universum Film AG, Babelsberg
- Website: www.hans-hass.org

Hans Hass (23 January 1919 – 16 June 2013) was an Austrian biologist and underwater diving pioneer. He was known mainly for being among the first scientists to popularise coral reefs, stingrays, octopuses and sharks. He pioneered the making of documentaries filmed underwater and led the development of a type of rebreather. He is also known for his energon theory and his commitment to protecting the environment.

== Early years ==
Hass was born in Vienna; his father was an attorney and Hass initially pursued law. However, Hass had a formative encounter with the American diver Guy Gilpatric while on a Riviera holiday in 1938 which included underwater hunting and photography. After making expeditions to the Caribbean Sea and writing his first professional articles in 1938-39, in 1940 Hass switched from reading law to studying zoology and graduated with a Ph.D. from the University of Berlin in 1943 at the Faculty of Biology. His thesis was the first scientific research project that used an autonomous rebreather diving equipment. In his early diving he used rebreathers, which he had made for him by the German diving gear makers Dräger: he had these sets made with the breathing bag on his back, as he did not like the bag-on-chest "frogman look". Hass and his team of researchers logged over 2000 dives utilising oxygen rebreathers from 1942 to 1953.

Although Don Stewart, one of the first scuba operators on the Caribbean island of Bonaire, blames Hass for single-handedly hunting the Atlantic goliath grouper to local extinction in a book by Callum Roberts, the author clearly refutes that claim later in the same paragraph.

== Wartime period ==
Hass published "Diving to Adventure," his first book of underwater photographs, in 1939 and some credit him with developing one of the first underwater cameras. Hass completed his first underwater film called Pirsch unter Wasser (Stalking under Water) in 1940. It was published by the Universum Film AG, originally lasted only 16 minutes and was shown in cinemas before the main film, but would eventually be extended by additional filming done in the Adriatic Sea close to Dubrovnik.

Hass moved from Vienna to Berlin in 1941, where he founded the tax privileged society Expedition für biologische Meereskunde (Expedition for biological oceanography).

Hass was excused from serving in the German military during the Second World War because of poor circulation in his feet caused by Raynaud's disease.

From the proceeds of his hundreds of lectures, Hass was able to buy the sailing ship Seeteufel in 1942. However, he was not able to use the ship for his planned expedition because the ship was in the harbour of Stettin and it was not possible to bring it to the Mediterranean Sea during the war.

Therefore, Hass rented a ship in Piraeus and sailed for several months in the Aegean Sea and the Sea of Crete in 1942. Before the war, this ship had been owned by the University of Vienna. During this expedition he filmed and took photos underwater. Hass had read the book Die Raubfischer in Hellas (The Pirate Fishers in Greece) written in 1939 by Werner Helwig. Hass found this group near Skiathos and was able to film their dynamite fishing under water.

In spring and summer of 1943, Hass stayed for several months at the Stazione Zoologica in Naples and Capri to study and collect Bryozoa, aquatic invertebrate animals, for his doctoral thesis in zoology. In February 1944, he completed the thesis to become a Doctor of Science.

Until the end of the war Hass lived and worked in the film studios of Universum Film AG in Babelsberg near Berlin to cut and finish his film about the expedition in the Aegean Sea. This 84-minute underwater film, Menschen unter Haien (Men among Sharks), was released in 1947. It shows marine life including wrasse, jellyfish, sponges, sea anemones and rays. The highlights of this film include dynamite fishing and interaction of divers with sharks.

In Babelsberg he met Hannelore Schroth, a famous German actress. Hans and Hannelore married in 1945.

== Post war activity and fame ==
In 1945 the Seeteufel was lost when the Soviets captured Königsberg.

In 1947 his film Menschen unter Haien had its world premiere in Zürich, and his most popular book with a very similar title was released in 1948. As a consequence, he got contracts with Herzog-Film (Munich) and Sascha-Film (Vienna). He also went on his first expedition with his new research ship named 'Xarifa', which was mostly financed through photo safaris in the Red Sea and by the BBC.

Hass's marriage to Hannelore Schroth produced a son, Hans Hass, Jr. The marriage ended in 1950 and he married his second wife, Lotte Baierl, that same year.

Hass produced 105 commercial films, many featuring himself and his second wife, who was an expert diver. In 1951, Hass's film Under the Red Sea was awarded the first prize at the Venice Film Festival.

After expeditions in East Africa and South Asia, his first TV series was developed in 1959, in 1961 for the first time about creatures outside the water. This was followed by behavioural research and the 'energon theory' from 1963 to 1966. From his behavioural research, Hass formed his energon hypothesis, the focus of his work in later years. It posits that the behaviours of all life-forms — human, nonhuman animal and plant — have common origins. Combined with management strategies, Hass published about commonalities with evolution in 1969. In the 1970s he addressed environmental and commercial themes and was appointed to a professorship by the University of Vienna. In 1983, he started long term studies and tutorials about predatory instincts in profession. Hass consolidated marine biology, behaviour research and management theories under one umbrella. He believed that his energon theory could not be disproved. In 1989, he addressed himself to environmental themes.

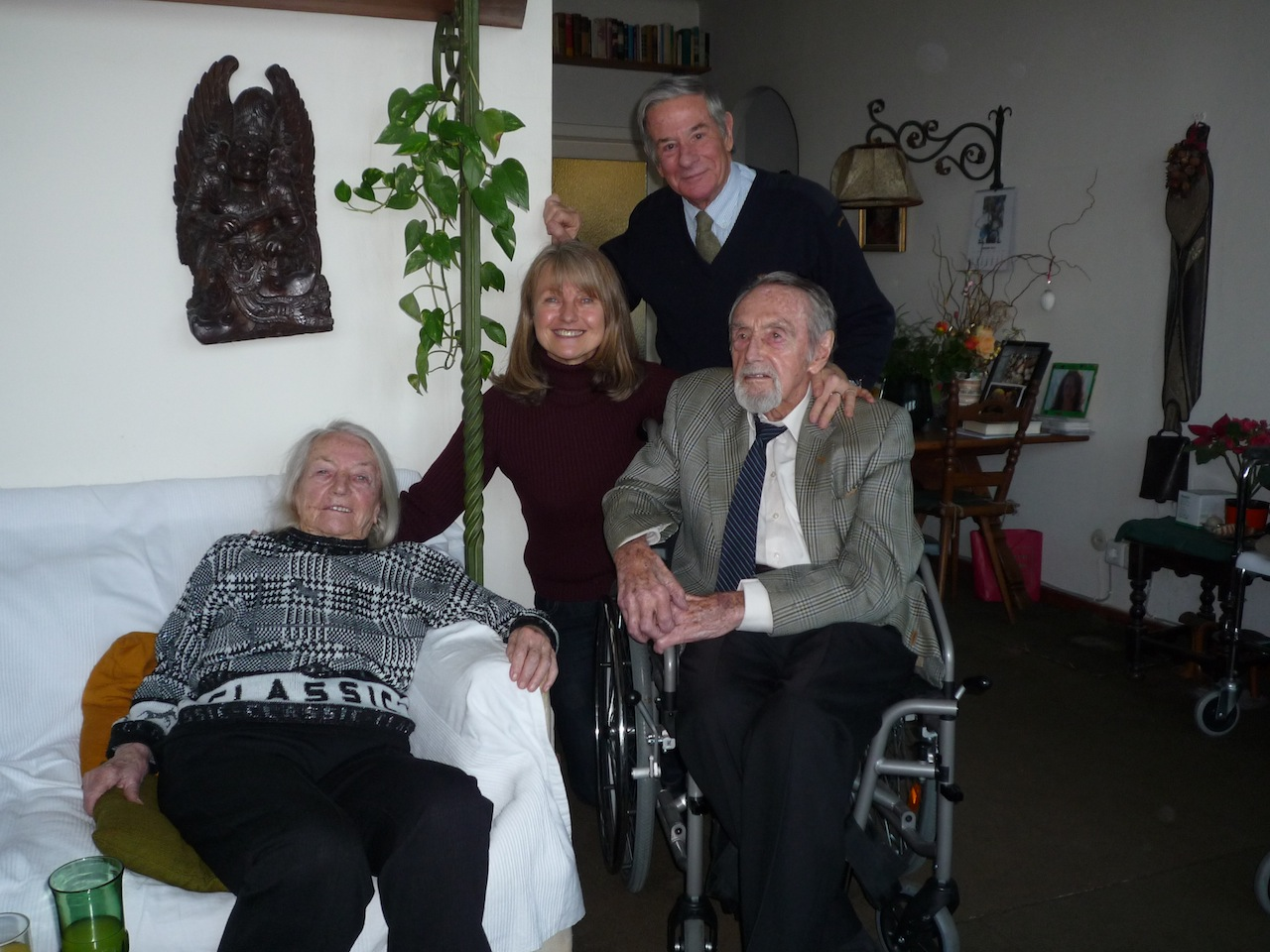
Hass with his family in 2012

After the Australian Prime Minister Harold Holt disappeared in the waters of Cheviot Beach at Portsea, Victoria on 17 December 1967, Hass visited Australia and explored the area where Holt disappeared for his 1971 film documentary Das Geheimnis der Cheviot Bay (The Secret of Cheviot Bay). In an interview with Harry Martin for the ABC's current affairs programme "A.M" Hass said that having observed the underwater conditions of the area with its sharp and jagged rocks, he was convinced that Holt had been trapped in the structure of one of these rocks and his body considerably torn by the nature of the forces of the sea and the sharp rocks.

Hass acknowledged a rivalry with the better-known French scientist Jacques Cousteau; according to the New York Times obituary, Hass told historian Tim Ecott that "For Cousteau there exists only Cousteau. He never acknowledged others or corrected the impression that he wasn't the first in diving or underwater photography." Hans Hass publicly challenged this claim in 1994.

Hass died on 16 June 2013 in Vienna. He was 94 and was survived by his wife and daughter Meta. Lotte Hass died in January 2015. Hass's son Hans Hass Jr., an actor and composer, committed suicide in 2009.

In 2002 the Historical Diving Society established the Hans Hass Award which is awarded to individuals that display international achievement in underwater science, technology, or arts and literature.

== Innovation in diving technology ==
His main innovations in diving technology were:

- 1938: New light-weight UW photo camera for ROBOT
- 1940: First UW colour photos (Catalina Island, USA) and UW film
- 1941: Development of the technique of swim diving for research, industry and sport.
- 1944: Construction of a heliox rebreather (prototype)
- 1949: New system of deep-sea-film and photography (called 'Bathyopthalm')
- 1949: Worldwide patents for a new method of fishing by radio signals (called 'Elektro-Marina')'
- 1949: System Hans Hass swim fin designed by Hans Hass and manufactured from 1949 by Semperit of Vienna and from 1951 by Barakuda of Hamburg and Heinke of London.
- 1950: UW camera housing 'Leica System Hans Hass' with electronic flash
- 1954: UW camera housing 'Rolleimarin System Hans Hass', also as stereo camera
- 1955: Co-development and promotion of a UW watch (ENICAR Sherpa)
- 1956: New patented design of swim fins (called 'Superfish')
- 1973: Construction of a UW habitat (Almeria, Spain)
- 1977: Construction of a small submersible together with the German firm BRUKER for deep-sea research, tourism and oil exploration.
- 1983: Development and promotion of an innovative decompression computer (called 'Deco-Brain')

== Publications ==
- 4 popular films
- about 70 television films
- more than 25 books, including:
  - 1939: Jagd unter Wasser mit Harpune und Kamera (Hunt under water with harpoon and camera)
  - 1941: Unter Korallen und Haien (Among corals and sharks)
  - 1942: Fotojagd am Meeresgrund (Photo-hunt at the sea-bottom)
  - 1947: Drei Jäger auf dem Meeresgrund (Three hunters on the sea-bottom)
  - 1949: Menschen und Haie (Humans and sharks)
  - 1952: Manta, Teufel im Roten Meer (Manta, devil in the Red Sea): English version: Manta, Under the Red Sea with Spear and Camera, English translation by James Cleugh, 1952, Rand McNally & Co., Library of Congress Card Cat. No. 53-6152.
  - 1954: Ich fotografierte in den 7 Meeren (I photographed in the 7 seas)
  - 1957: Wir kommen aus dem Meer (We come from the sea)
  - 1958: Fische und Korallen (Fish and corals)
  - 1961: Expedition ins Unbekannte (Expedition into the unknown)
  - 1968: Wir Menschen. Das Geheimnis unseres Verhaltens (We humans. The secret of our behaviour. Published in English as The Human Animal)
  - 1970: Energon: Das verborgene Geheimnis (Energon: The hidden secret)
  - 1971: In unberührte Tiefen. Die Bezwingung der tropischen Meere. (Into untouched depths. Conquest of the tropical seas)
  - 1972: Vorstoss in die Tiefe. Ein Magazin über Abenteuer bei der Erforschung der Meere. (Raid into the depth. A magazine about adventure while researching the seas)
  - 1973: Welt unter Wasser. Der abenteuerliche Vorstoss des Menschen ins Meer. (World under water. The adventurous raid of humans in the sea)
  - 1976: Eroberung der Tiefe. Das Meer - seine Geheimnisse, seine Gefahren, seine Erforschung. (Conquest of the deeps. The sea - its secrets, its dangers, its research)
  - 1976: Der Hans-Hass-Tauchführer. Das Mittelmeer. Ein Ratgeber für Sporttaucher und Schnorchler. (The Hans Hass dive guide. The Mediterranean. A guide for sport divers and snorkellers.)
  - 1977: Der Hai. Legende eines Mörders. (The shark. Legend of a killer)
  - 1978: Die Schöpfung geht weiter. Station Mensch im Strom des Lebens. (The creation continues. Station of humans in the river of life)
  - 1979: Wie der Fisch zum Menschen wurde. Die faszinierende Entwicklungsgeschichte unseres Körpers. (How fish became humans. The fascinating history of the development of our body)
  - 1980: Im Roten Meer. Wiederkehr nach 30 Jahren. (In the Red Sea. Return after 30 years)
  - 1985: Stadt und Lebensqualität. (City and quality of life)
  - 1986: Abenteuer unter Wasser. Meine Erlebnisse und Forschungen im Meer. (Adventure under water. My experiences and research in the sea)
  - 1987: Der Ball und die Rose (The ball and the rose)
  - 1988: Der Hai im Management. Instinkte steuern und kontrollieren. (The shark in management. Steering and controlling instincts)
  - 1991: Vorstoss in unbekannte Meere (Push into unknown seas)
  - 1994: Die Hyperzeller. Das neue Menschenbild der Evolution. (Hyper-cellular organisms. The new human picture of evolution)
  - 1996: Aus der Pionierzeit des Tauchens. In unberührte Tiefen. (From the pioneer era of diving. Into untouched depths)
  - 2004: Erinnerungen und Abenteuer. (Memories and adventures)

== Awards ==
- First Prize of the Chancellor for the "best movie idea for an Austrian propaganda film" (1949)
- Gold Medal of the Photographic Society in Vienna (1950)
- Biennale Prize (1951)
- The film "Adventure in the Red Sea" received the International Prize for feature-length documentaries at the 2nd Mostra Internazionale del Film Scientifico e del Documentario d'Arte in Venice (1951)
- The TV series "Diving to Adventure" is voted "Programme of the Year" by the BBC (1956)
- Outstanding Underwater Photographer of the Year of the Underwater Photographic Society (USA, International Underwater Film Festival 1959)
- Oscar for extraordinary underwater photography for the film Under the Caribbean (1959)
- Honorary Member of the Association of German Sports Divers (1974)
- Honorary title of "Professor" awarded by Science Minister Hertha Firnberg (1977)
- Honorary Member of the German publishing house Europäische Bildungsgemeinschaft Verlags-GmbH ("European Education Community Publishers Ltd."), Stuttgart (1978)
- Science Medal of the City of Linz (1987)
- IADS Lifetime Achievement Award (International Association of Diving Schools, 1989)
- Golden Badge of Honour of the Association of German Sports Divers (VDST, 1994)
- Honorary President of the Förderkreis Sporttauchen (Sports Diving Support Group) (1994)
- Reg Vallintine Achievement Award for Historical Diving (UK, 1994)
- Reaching Out Award (Diving Equipment & Marketing Association, United States; 1997)
- Diving Pioneer Trophy of the Historical Diving Society (USA, 1997)
- Diving Pioneer Award of the Historical Diving Society (Italy, 1997)
- Austrian Decoration for Science and Art (1997)*
- Two NOGI Awards for Science and Distinguished Service (USA, 1998)
- Gold Medal of Honour of Vienna (1999)
- Honorary President of the PEN Club Liechtenstein (1999)
- Konrad Lorenz Award for Conservation (1999)
- Golden Medal of Honour of the Austrian Federal Guild of Photographers (1999)
- DANUBIUS Donauland Sachbuchpreis (Danubia Non-Fiction Prize) (1999)
- Goldenes Lot (Gold plumb) award of the Association of German surveyors (1999)
- International Scuba Diving Hall of Fame, 2000
- Dieter Plage Lifetime Achievement Award for special achievements in the nature film sector (2001)
- Christopher Parsons Award for outstanding achievement in the field of nature films (2004)
- Peace Prize for Biology of the "World Association of Private Schools and Universities for Complementary Healing Practices" (2005)
- Cayman Islands International Scuba Diving Hall of Fame Award (2006)
- Wyland ICON Award (2006)
- Beneath the Sea Special Award (2006)
- Pannatura Prize for outstanding services in the nature film sector (2006)
- Schmitz-Salue Medal awarded by the Friends of Aquazoo-Löbbecke Museum, Düsseldorf (2009)
- Elisabeth Mann Borgese marine prize (Schleswig-Holstein, 2009)
- DIVA - German Entertainment Prize (2011)
- Platinum Romy award for lifetime achievement (2012)
- A cone snail found in the Philippines was named after him (Protoconus hanshassi) (2012)
- A park in Vienna was named "Hans Hass Park" (2018).

== See also ==
- Hans Hass Award – Award in recognition of contribution made to the advancement of knowledge of the ocean
