= Chima (singer) =

German singer

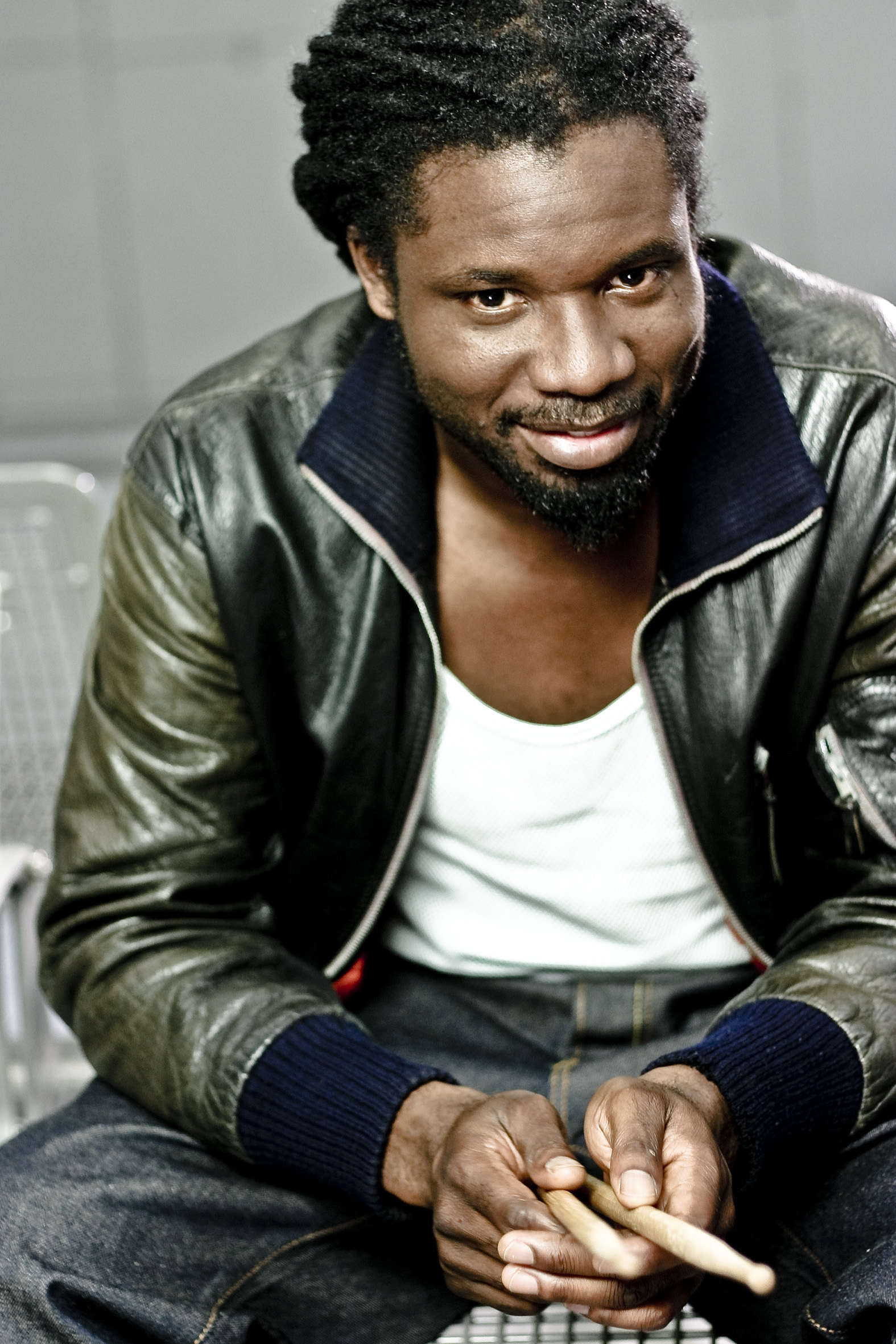
- Chima in 2005

Background information
- Born: November 6, 1972 (age 53); Frankfurt, Germany
- Occupation: Singer

Chimaobinna Enyiakanwanne Onyele (born 6 November 1972, in Frankfurt, Germany), known by the stagename Chima ([t͡ʃiːma]) is a German singer based in Frankfurt. A member of Brothers Keepers, since 2012 he has recorded as a solo artist for Universal Music.

== Life ==
Chima's parents moved in the 1960s from Nigeria to Germany. He was born in 1972 in Frankfurt, where he graduated from the Ernst-Reuter-School. Afterwards he studied Sociology.

== Discography ==
Albums:

- 2002: Reine Glaubenssache
- 2005: Im Rahmen der Möglichkeiten
- 2012: Stille
- 2014: Von Steinen und Elefanten

Singles:

- 2001: Ich leb das
- 2002: Lass los
- 2005: Wundervoll
- 2006: Immer noch
- 2012: Morgen
- 2012: Ausflug ins Blaue
- 2012: Fliegen
- 2014: 100 Elefanten
- 2014: Das große Schweigen (exclusive on Spotify)
