= Farben meiner Welt =

Studio album by Yvonne Catterfeld
- Released: 1 March 2004
- Length: 58:02
- Label: Hansa; BMG
- Producer: Dieter Bohlen; William T. Davis; Frank Hassas; Tom Huber; André Kuntze; Chris LeBlanc; Christoph Leis-Bendorff; Florian Lüttich; Xavier Naidoo; Neil Palmer; Schallbau; David A. Stewart; Philippe van Eecke; Jürgen Wind

Yvonne Catterfeld chronology
Meine Welt (2003)	Farben meiner Welt (2004)	Unterwegs (2005)

Farben meiner Welt (English: Colors of My World) is the second studio album by German recording artist Yvonne Catterfeld, released by Hansa Records and BMG on 1 March 2004.

== Track listing ==
Farben meiner Welt track listing
No.	Title	Writer(s)	Producer(s)	Length
1.	"Du hast mein Herz gebrochen"	Dieter Bohlen; Ekrem Bora	Bohlen	3:25
2.	"Wenn ich"	Bohlen; Diane Weigmann	Bohlen	3:51
3.	"Aus der Sicht des Mondes"	Quickmix; Jürgen Wind; Raimund Rahner	Wind; Frank Hassas	4:05
4.	"Einmal ist keinmal"	Tom Huber; Franxon Meyer; Florian Lüttich; Janna Ji	Chris LeBlanc; Tom Huber; Florian Lüttich	3:32
5.	"Die Zeit des Wartens"	Xavier Naidoo; William T. Davis; Neil Palmer	Naidoo; Davis; Palmer	4:12
6.	"Liebe war es nicht"	Naidoo; Philippe van Eecke	Naidoo; van Eecke	4:06
7.	"Reichtum der Welt"	Holger Biege; Fred Gertz	André Kuntze	3:06
8.	"Ihre Art zu lachen"	Götz von Sydow; Ralf Hildenbeutel	Schallbau	3:17
9.	"Liebesbrief"	von Sydow; Hildenbeutel	Schallbau	3:34
10.	"Halt mich"	von Sydow; Hildenbeutel	Schallbau	4:41
11.	"Ich glaub an dich"	Boris Bruchhaus; Nelifer; Mic Ado	Wind; Hassas	3:55
12.	"Du bleibst immer noch du"	A.C. Ademy; Catterfeld; Christoph Leis-Bendorff	Leis-Bendorff	3:51
13.	"Fliegen ohne Flügel"	Bohlen; A&R Chartbreaker; S. Stadle	Bohlen	4:03
14.	"Für immer und ewig"	Bohlen	Bohlen	4:29
15.	"Farben meiner Welt"	Bohlen; A&R Chartbreaker; Stadle	Bohlen	4:00
16.	"Engel blicken nie zurück"	Michael Kunze; David A. Stewart; Klausnitzer	Stewart	4:31
Total length:				58:02

== Charts ==
=== Weekly charts ===
Weekly chart performance for Farben meiner Welt
Chart (2004)	Peak position
Austrian Albums (Ö3 Austria)	9
German Albums (Offizielle Top 100)	2
Swiss Albums (Schweizer Hitparade)	7

=== Year-end charts ===
Year-end chart performance for Farben meiner Welt
Chart (2004)	Position
German Albums (Official Top 100)	36

== Certifications ==
Certifications for Farben meiner Welt
Region	Certification	Certified units/sales
Germany (BVMI)	Gold	100,000^{^}
^{^} Shipments figures based on certification alone.

== Release history ==
Farben meiner Welt release history
Region	Date	Format(s)	Label(s)
Austria	1 March 2004	Digital download; CD	Hansa; BMG
Germany	1 March 2004	Digital download; CD	Hansa; BMG
Switzerland	1 March 2004	Digital download; CD	Hansa; BMG
