= Meine Welt =

Studio album by Yvonne Catterfeld
- Released: 26 May 2003
- Length: 64:08
- Label: Hansa; BMG
- Producer: Gary B.; Dieter Bohlen; DJ Derezon; FlexibelBetriebe; Achim Jannsen; Chris Kusch; Udo Lindenberg; G. Mart; Mighty KK; O-Jay; Oliver Pinelli; Ingo Politz; Schallbau; Mirko von Schlieffen; Manfred Thiers; Bernd Wendlandt

Yvonne Catterfeld chronology
Meine Welt (2003)	Farben meiner Welt (2004)

Meine Welt (English: My World) is the debut studio album by the German singer Yvonne Catterfeld, released by Hansa Records and BMG on 26 May 2003 in German-speaking Europe. Produced in a period of two years, during which Catterfeld was cast in a main role in the soap opera Gute Zeiten, schlechte Zeiten, she worked with a variety of musicians on the album, including Dieter Bohlen, Lukas Hilbert, Udo Lindenberg, Laith Al-Deen, Annette Humpe, Ingo Politz, and Bernd Wendlandt, among others.

The album debuted at number one on the German Albums Chart and was certified Platinum by the Bundesverband Musikindustrie (BVMI). Elsewhere, it reached top three in Switzerland and the top five in Austria, going Gold in both nations. At the 2004 awards ceremony, Meine Welt won Catterfeld the Echo Music Prize for Best National Rock/Pop Female Artist. Preceded by four singles, it spawned the number one hit "Für dich" which became a chart topper in Austria, Germany, and Switzerland.

== Promotion ==
Meine Welt was preceded by the singles "Komm zurück zu mir" (2001) and "Niemand sonst" (2002), both of which were released under Catterfeld's surname, as well as singles "Gefühle" (2002) and "Für dich" (2003), the latter of which became her breakthrough single as well as one of the biggest-selling songs of the year, reaching number one in Austria, Germany, and Switzerland. Her biggest-selling single, "Für dich" was certified Platinum in Germany and Gold in Austria and Switzerland, respectively.

== Critical reception ==
Professional ratings
Review scores
Source	Rating
laut.de	2/5 stars

laut.de editor Eberhard Dobler rated the album two out of five stars. He found that "mediocre standard arrangements, boring computer sounds and often a clean acoustic guitar dominate the production [...] Yvonne Catterfeld's love songs fortunately do not contain excessive pathos - her voice rather spreads the atmosphere of gentle eroticism. You can only wish her better producers for her next album."

== Chart performance ==
Meine Welt debuted at number one on the German Albums Chart in the week of 9 June 2003. It remained seven weeks within the top ten and was eventually certified Platinum by the Bundesverband Musikindustrie (BVMI) for shipment figures in excess of 200,000 units. Meine Welt also reached the top three in Switzerland and number four on the Austrian Albums Chart.

== Track listing ==
Meine Welt track listing
No.	Title	Writer(s)	Producer(s)	Length
1.	"Für dich"	Dieter Bohlen; Klaus Hirschburger; Lukas Hilbert	Bohlen	4:31
2.	"Abendstern"	Catterfeld; Thomas Rüllich; Mighty KK; Olli Pinelli; Bintia Harris	Pinelli; Mighty KK; DJ Derezon	3:32
3.	"Niemand sonst"	Götz von Sydow; Ralf Hildenbeutel	Schallbau	3:33
4.	"Wenn du mich berührst"	Mighty KK; Harris	Mighty KK	3:44
5.	"Blaue Augen"	Annette Humpe	Pinelli; Mighty KK	4:19
6.	"Die Welt steht still"	Stevie B-Zet; Ralf Hildenbeutel; Laith Al-Deen; A.C. Boutsen	Schallbau	4:21
7.	"Gefühle"	Hirschburger; Mirko von Schlieffen; Achim Jannsen; Manfred Thiers	Jannsen; von Schlieffen; Thiers	3:38
8.	"Sag mir"	Hildenbeutel; von Sydow; Evans	Schallbau	4:30
9.	"Manchmal"	Olaf Jeglitza; Boris Köhler	O-Jay; Gary B.; Chris Kusch	3:36
10.	"Unendlich weit"	Andreas John; Erik McHoll; Alexandra Ziehm	Ingo Politz; Bernd Wendlandt	3:47
11.	"Verwelkt"	John; McHoll; Ziehm	Politz; Wendlandt	3:39
12.	"Komm zurück zu mir"	Jeglitza; Köhler	G. Mart	3:39
13.	"Niemandsland" (featuring Udo Lindenberg)	Lindenberg; Angelina Maccarone	Lindenberg; FlexibelBetriebe	3:52
14.	"Regenbogen"	Pinelli; Daniel Zenke	Pinelli; Mighty KK	4:10
15.	"If I Could"	Hildenbeutel; von Sydow	Schallbau	3:33
16.	"If You"	Bohlen	Bohlen	3:45
Total length:				64:08

== Charts ==
=== Weekly charts ===
Weekly chart performance for Meine Welt
Chart (2003)	Peak position
Austrian Albums (Ö3 Austria)	4
German Albums (Offizielle Top 100)	1
Swiss Albums (Schweizer Hitparade)	3

=== Year-end charts ===
Year-end chart performance for Meine Welt
Chart (2003)	Position
Austrian Albums (Ö3 Austria)	60
German Albums (Official Top 100)	26
Swiss Albums (Schweizer Hitparade)	45

== Certifications ==
Certifications for Meine Welt
Region	Certification	Certified units/sales
Austria (IFPI Austria)	Gold	15,000^{*}
Germany (BVMI)	Platinum	200,000^{^}
Switzerland (IFPI Switzerland)	Gold	20,000^{^}
^{*} Sales figures based on certification alone.^{^} Shipments figures based on certification alone.

== Release history ==
Meine Welt release history
Region	Date	Format(s)	Label(s)
Austria	26 May 2003	Digital download; CD	Hansa; BMG
Germany	26 May 2003	Digital download; CD	Hansa; BMG
Switzerland	26 May 2003	Digital download; CD	Hansa; BMG
