= The Best Singers (series) =

Reality television franchise

- Created by: FTV Rights B.V.
- Original work: De beste zangers van Nederland
- Years: 2009–present

Films and television
- Television series: The Best Singers (see international versions)

Miscellaneous
- Genre: Reality television
- First aired: 5 July 2009
- Distributor: FTV Productions B.V.

The Best Singers, created and owned by FTV Rights B.V., is a reality television series that has been broadcast under various names in a number of European countries.

The original format is produced in the Netherlands by FTV Productions B.V. and broadcast on NPO 1 by public broadcaster AVROTROS (formerly AVRO and TROS. The two broadcasters merged in 2013). The series was originally called De beste zangers van Nederland (meaning The Best Singers of the Netherlands), now it is called Beste Zangers (Best Singers).

== History ==
After its highly successful launch in the Netherlands in 2009, Sweden launched its Swedish series starting 2010 called Så mycket bättre (meaning So Much Better). In Denmark the show is called Toppen af Poppen (meaning Top of the pops), airing two seasons the first year. Norway has started its own show in 2012 as Hver gang vi møtes (meaning Every Time We Meet). The Finnish series was launched also in 2012 under the title Vain elämää (meaning Just Life). Ever since the show has been licensed in France (on TF1, where it is called Stars au grand air), China (on CCTV), Estonia (Laula mu laulu, meaning Sing my song) and most recently it launched very successfully in Germany (Sing meinen Song - Das Tauschkonzert) on VOX. The Spanish adaptation, titled A mi manera (meaning My way), premiered in 2016 on laSexta. In 2020 the series started its local version in Switzerland.

Similar shows are planned in Australia, Brazil, Italy and Russia, the United Kingdom and the United States.

== Format ==
In each episode in any give series, a number of well-known local performers would be picked (varying between 6 and 8 each season) and in each episode, one singer would be centrally focused as the remaining artists sing songs by that specific artist or other songs that are meaningful to that artist. The original artist reflects on the "adaptions" (NOT "covers") of their songs done by the other participants. The final episode is usually dedicated to duets and a revisit to favorite performances during the season.

== International versions ==
Country	Local title (Translation)	Network	Air date	Series completed
Belgium	Liefde voor muziek (Love for Music)	VTM	Season 1 (2014); Season 2 (2015); Season 3 (2017); Season 4 (2018); Season 5 (2019); Season 6 (2020); Season 7 (2021)	7
Denmark	Toppen af Poppen (Top of the Pops)	TV 2	Season 1 (2011); Season 2 (2011); Season 3 (2012); Season 4 (2014); Season 5 (2015); Season 6 (2016); Season 7 (2017); Season 8 (2018); Season 9 (2019); Season 10 (2020); Season 11 (2021) Season 12 (2022) Season 13 (2024) Season 14 (2026)	14
Estonia	Laula mu laulu (Sing My Song)	Kanal 2	Season 1 (spring 2014); Season 2 (autumn 2014); Season 3 (spring 2015); Season 4 (autumn 2015)	4
Finland	Vain elämää (Just Life)	Nelonen	Season 1 (2012); Season 2 (2013); Season 3 (2014); Season 4 (2015); Season 5 (2016); Season 6 (spring 2017); Season 7 (autumn 2017); Season 8 (spring 2018); Season 9 (autumn 2018); Season 10 (2019); Season 11 (2020); Season 12 (2021); Season 13 (2022); Season 14 (2023); Season 15 (2024) Season 16 (2025) Season 17 (2026)	15
France	Stars au grand air	TF1	Season 1 (Early 2014); Season 2 (Fall 2014)	2
Germany	Sing meinen Song – Das Tauschkonzert (Sing My Song – The Exchange Concert)	VOX	Season 1 (2014); Season 2 (2015); Season 3 (2016); Season 4 (2017); Season 5 (2018); Season 6 (2019); Season 7 (2020); Season 8 (2021); Season 9 (2022); Season 10 (2023)	10
Netherlands	Beste Zangers (Best Singers)	AVROTROS	Season 1 (2009); Season 2 (2010); Season 3 (2011); Season 4 (2012); Season 5 (2013); Season 6 (2014); Season 7 (2014); Season 8 (2015); Season 9 (2016); Season 10 (2017); Season 11 (2018); Season 12 (2019); Season 13 (2020); Season 14 (2021); Season 15 (2022); Season 16 (2023); Season 17 (2024)	17
Norway	Hver gang vi møtes (Every Time We Meet)	TV 2	Season 1 (2012); Season 2 (2013); Season 3 (2014); Season 4 (2015); Season 5 (2016); Season 6 (2017); Season 7 (2018); Season 8 (2019); Season 9 (2020); Season 10: jubileum (2020); Season 11 (2021); Season 12 (2022); Season 13 (2023); Season 14 (2024); Season 15 (2025) Season 16 (2026)	15
Spain	A mi manera (My way)	laSexta	Season 1 (2016)	1
Sweden	Så mycket bättre (So Much Better)	TV4	Season 1 (2010); Season 2 (2011); Season 3 (2012); Season 4 (2013); Season 5 (2014); Season 6 (2015); Season 7 (2016); Season 8 (2017); Season 9 (2018); Season 10 (2019); Season 11 (2020); Season 12 (2021); Season 13 (2022); Season 14 (2023); Season 15 (2024)	15
