= Yvonne Catterfeld =

German singer and actress

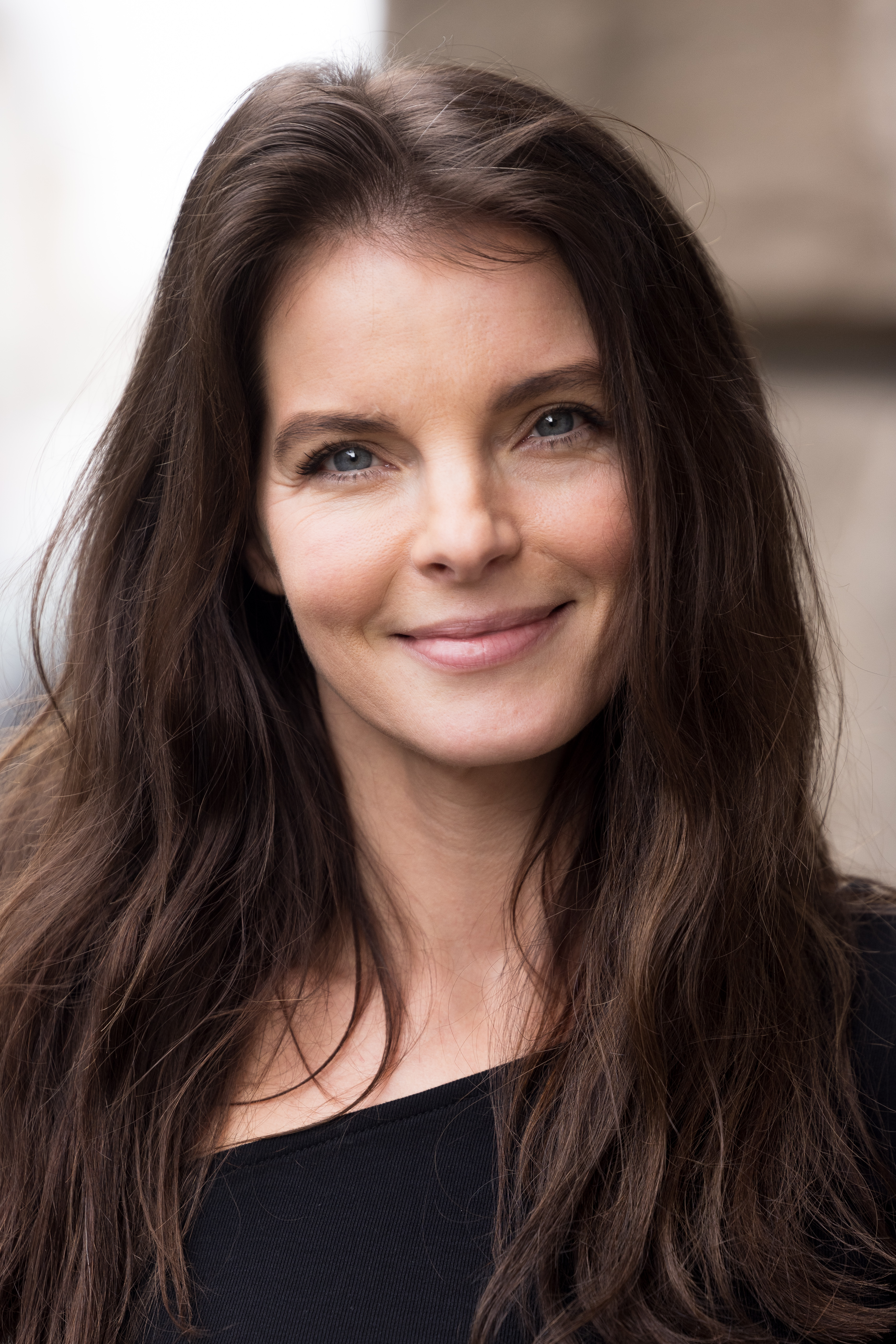
- Catterfeld in 2024
- Born: 2 December 1979 (age 46); Erfurt, East Germany (now Germany)
- Occupations: Singer; actress
- Years active: 2001–present
- Spouse: Oliver Wnuk (2007–2021)
- Children: 1
- Musical career
- Genres: Pop; Soul; R&B
- Instrument: Vocals
- Website: www.yvonnecatterfeld.com

Yvonne Catterfeld (born 2 December 1979) is a German singer, actress and television personality. Born and raised in Erfurt, Thuringia, she later moved to Leipzig to pursue her career in music. In 2000, she participated in the debut season of the singing competition series Stimme 2000, where she came in second place. Catterfeld subsequently signed a recording deal with Hansa Records, which released her debut single "Bum" in 2001. The same year, she was propelled to stardom when she was cast in a main role in the German soap opera Gute Zeiten, schlechte Zeiten. In 2003, Catterfeld made her musical breakthrough when her fifth single, "Für dich", became an international number-one hit and produced the equally successful album Meine Welt.

Catterfeld continued booking success with follow-up albums Farben meiner Welt (2004) and Unterwegs (2005), which spawned the hit singles "Du hast mein Herz gebrochen" and "Glaub an mich". Following her departure from GZSZ and a starring role in the short-living telenovela Sophie – Braut wider Willen, she released her fourth album Aura, which was less successful commercially and led to a decline in her musical career. She transitioned to Sony Music, and after an unsuccessful period, returned to the top of music charts with the reissue of her sixth album Lieber so (2013), when she appeared in the second season of Sing meinen Song - Das Tauschkonzert, the German version of the series The Best Singers.

Throughout a career spanning 15 years, Catterfeld has sold nearly one million records as a solo artist, making her one of the best-known German female music artists. Aside from her commercial accomplishments, her work has earned her numerous awards and accolades, including a Bambi Award, a Goldene Stimmgabel, and an ECHO Award. An established actress, she has appeared in several international television and theatrical films, including Keinohrhasen (2007), The Promise (2011), and Beauty and the Beast (2014). In 2016, 2017, 2018, 2020, and 2024, she was a coach on the German television series The Voice of Germany.

== Early life ==
Catterfeld was born and raised in Erfurt, Thuringia, then part of East Germany. Her father, Jürgen Catterfeld, is a foreman; her mother, Annemarie Catterfeld, is a teacher. A former athlete, Catterfeld started playing the piano and the flute at the age of 15, simultaneously taking her first dance and vocal lessons. After her high school graduation from Albert-Schweitzer-Gymnasium in Erfurt, she relocated to Leipzig to study pop and jazz at the Felix Mendelssohn College of Music and Theatre for two years. In 1998, her seven-song debut release, entitled KIV, hit the market but found little to no recognition in the music industry.

== Career ==
=== 2000–2003 ===
After her studies in Leipzig, Catterfeld participated in the second season of the MDR singing competition series Stimme 2000, where she performed under her short-lived pseudonym Vivianne. Her self-written song "Whenever You Need a Friend" appeared on the show's promotional album Stimme 2000 – Die Finalisten. A critics' favorite, she finished second in the competition, losing to duo UC, consisting of singers Danny Heims and Kathrin Jantke, both of whom failed to sign a recording deal after the final show. Catterfeld, on the other hand, earned a management and recording contract with BMG sub-label Hansa Music by Stimme 2000 jury member and label boss Thomas Stein.

In 2001, Hansa released Catterfeld's first single "Bum", a re-written German uptempo version of British girl group All Saints's 1998 hit single "Never Ever", promoting her under her surname only. The song failed to chart however. In support of her musical ambitions, she auditioned for a supporting role in the long-running RTL Television soap opera Gute Zeiten, schlechte Zeiten the same year. Though generally unenthusiastic about an acting career at the time, Catterfeld accepted RTL's offer to join the cast as character Julia Blum. She first appeared on-screen in episode 2316, broadcast on 20 September 2001. Two months later, her next single "Komm zurück zu mir", a pop soul ballad, was released. A significant shift from the EDM-influenced sound of her debut single, it reached number 76 on the German Singles Chart. In 2002, Catterfeld was handpicked by musician Udo Lindenberg to appear on his 33rd album Atlantic Affairs. She recorded vocals for two songs on the album, which was later re-worked into a revue in which Catterfeld co-starred. Two further singles released by Catterfeld, "Niemand sonst" and "Gefühle", both reached the top forty of the German Singles Chart in 2002.

In March 2003, "Für dich" was released. Composed by Dieter Bohlen and re-written for Catterfeld, the pop ballad was heavily promoted on GZSZ. Upon its release it became an instant success, reaching the top of charts in Austria, Germany, and Switzerland. One of the best-selling singles of 2003, it sold 250,000 copies within three days and was certified platinum by the Bundesverband Musikindustrie (BVMI). In May 2003, Catterfeld's debut album Meine Welt was released. A collection of pop songs and soul ballads with elements of contemporary R&B and dance, it debuted on top of the German Albums Chart and reached the top five in Austria and Switzerland, eventually going platinum. In October 2003, Mariah Carey invited Catterfeld to be the opening act for the German leg of her Charmbracelet World Tour in Hamburg, Berlin, and Munich. Also in 2003, Catterfeld hosted the MDR singing competition Lucky Star 2003, and became a regular co-host on the music event series The Dome.

=== 2004–2008 ===
In 2004, Catterfeld voiced angelfish Angie in the German version of DreamWorks' animated comedy film Shark Tale. "Du hast mein Herz gebrochen", the lead single from her second album, was released in January 2004 and became another number-one success for Catterfeld. Parent album Farben meiner Welt, was released two months later and reached the top ten on the charts. While not as commercially successful as its predecessor, it produced two further singles, both of which entered the top twenty and top thirty, respectively. After several breaks from filming, in late 2004, Catterfeld announced that she would permanently leave Gute Zeiten, schlechte Zeiten to concentrate on her music career. Her last appearance was broadcast on 15 February 2005.

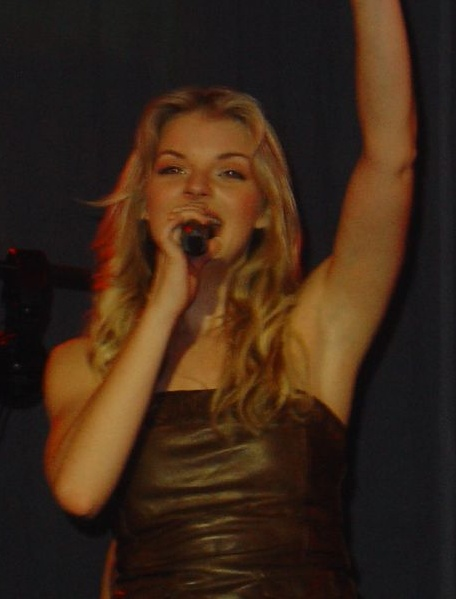
Catterfeld in March 2004

In March 2005, Unterwegs, Catterfeld's third album, was released. It debuted at number one the German Albums Chart and produced the top five single "Glaub an mich". Unterwegs was later certified gold by the Bundesverband Musikindustrie (BVMI). Following its release, Catterfeld ended her management contract with longtime mentor Veronika Jarzombek. In November of the same year, she began starring as fictional central character Countess Sophie von Ahlen in the historical telenovela Sophie – Braut wider Willen. Broadcast to uneven ratings on Das Erste, the series was cancelled in March 2006 after 65 episodes only.

In October 2006, the singer released her fourth studio album, Aura. Mousse T., Walter Afanasieff, and Max Herre contributed to the project which took Catterfeld's work further into the R&B genre and introduced an adult contemporary edge to her pop sound. Upon its release, Aura debuted and peaked at number ten on the German Albums Chart, marking her lowest-charting album yet. While lead single "Erinner mich, dich zu vergessen" became her fourth top ten hit, the album's second and final single "Die Zeit ist reif" failed to reach the upper half of the German Singles Chart. In November, Catterfeld filmed the RTL television film The Secret of the Königssee, a thriller inspired by English author Daphne du Maurier's 1938 novel Rebecca. The film was not released until 2008.

In 2007, she co-starred with Stephan Luca in the romantic comedy Wenn Liebe doch so einfach wär. The television film garnered strong ratings upon its premiere, but received mixed to negative reviews from critics. The same year, Catterfeld made a cameo appearance as herself in Til Schweiger's Rabbit Without Ears, which became a surprise box-office hit and has since ranked among the most successful German films in Germany since the beginning of the audience census in 1968. In 2008, Catterfeld had a supporting role in comedy film U-900, a big screen parody of Wolfgang Petersen's epic war film Das Boot (1981). The satire was universally panned by critics.

=== 2009–2013 ===
Catterfeld's first project of 2009 was the police thriller Schatten der Gerechtigkeit co-starring Richy Müller. The film was well received by critics. Volcano, a two-part disaster film about volcanic caldera lake Laacher See, was broadcast to generally mixed reviews from critics. It was awarded a German Television Award the following year. Engel sucht Liebe, a Christmas comedy film, inspired by Wim Wenders's Wings of Desire (1987), was broadcast to moderate ratings. Also in 2009, Catterfeld had a minor role in Lilly the Witch: The Dragon and the Magic Book, a children's film directed by Stefan Ruzowitzky, and again played herself in Til Schweiger's Rabbit Without Ears 2. Because of her resemblance to actress Romy Schneider, she had also been cast to play the title role in the Warner Bros. film Eine Frau wie Romy. The project was cancelled in July 2009.

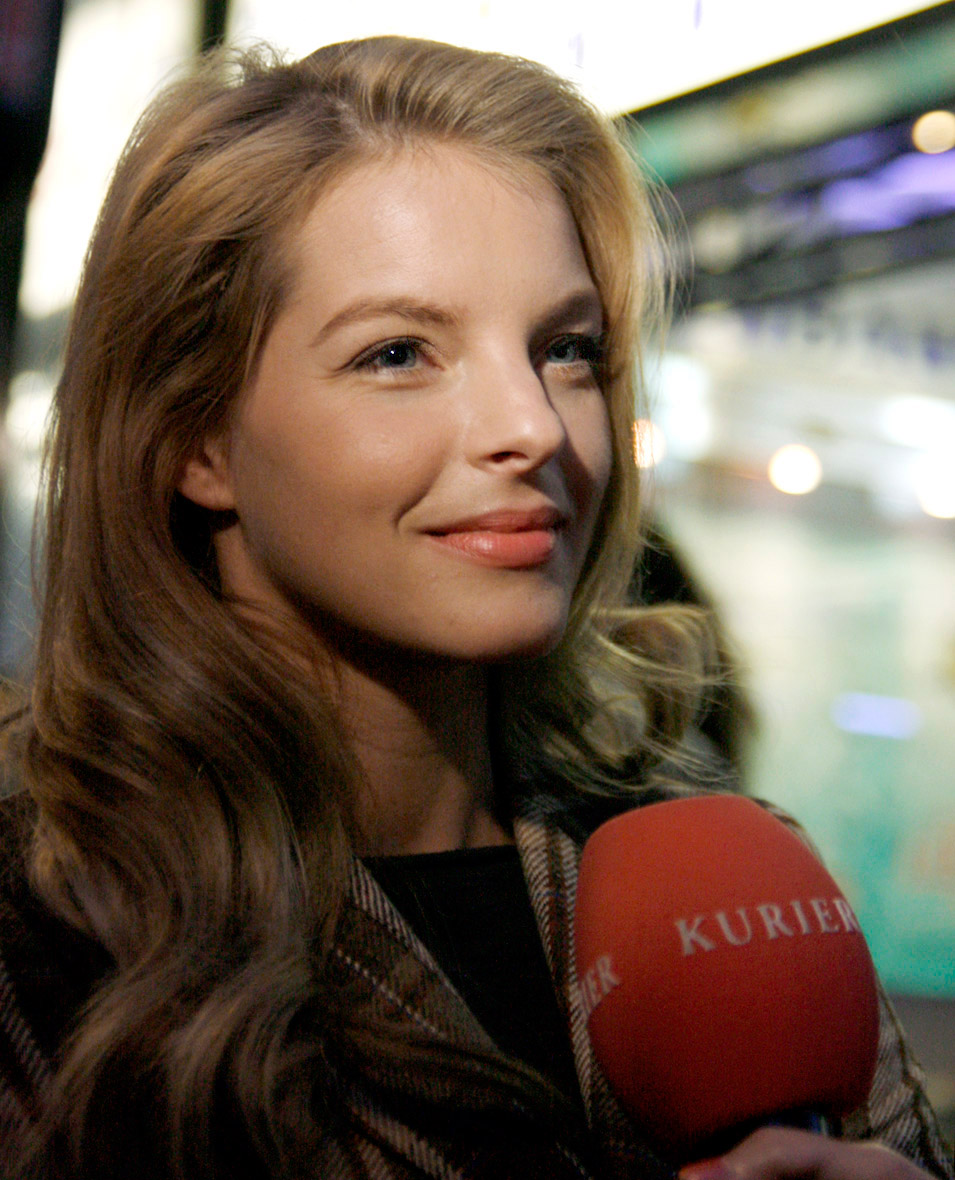
Catterfeld in Vienna in September 2010

In March 2010, Catterfeld released her fifth album Blau im Blau on Columbia Records. Taking Catterfeld's work further toward an adult audience, it was recorded with smaller group of musicians. A moderate commercial success, Blau im Blau reached number 37 on the German Albums Chart. Its same-title lead single, the only track lifted from the album, failed to peak within the top fifty of the German Singles Chart. Also in 2010, Catterfeld appeared in the Sat.1 television film Die Frau des Schläfers, in which she played a call centre operator, whose son is abducted by his Iran father. The drama was broadcast to strong ratings. Catterfeld portrayed a soap opera actress in Dani Levy's comedy film Life Is Too Long, which received a theatrical release in late 2010. The project garnered largely mixed reviews by critics, who called it "enjoyable and exhausting at once."

In 2011, the compilation album The Best of Yvonne Catterfeld – Von Anfang bis jetzt was released. The same year, Catterfeld had a role in the Channel 4 period mini series The Promise, written and directed by Peter Kosminsky. The serial praised by critics, and earned nominations for both the British Academy Television Awards 2011 and the Royal Television Society Programme Awards 2011 in the category of best drama serial. Also in 2011, she starred as Lotte Hass alongside Benjamin Sadler in the film The Girl at on the Ocean Floor about the first dive of Austrian biologist and diving pioneer Hans Hass in 1950. Broadcast in 2011 on ZDF and ORF, it became a rating success and earned Catterfeld favorable reviews for her performance. Catterfeld reunited with Stephan Luca for Am Ende die Hoffnung (2010), a romantic drama revolving around German submarine U-864 in World War II. Filmed in Berlin and Norway, the television film became a mediocre rating success for its network.

Catterfeld's only project of 2012 was Plötzlich 70!. A fantasy comedy about a young woman who ages to retirement age overnight, the actress had to go through four hours of make-up each day to fit the character. Upon its broadcast, the film became a lukewarm critical and commercial success. The following year, Catterfeld appeared in Sputnik (2013), a children's film set days before the fall of the Berlin Wall. It received a positive reception from critics. She had bigger roles in the ZDF musical film Nur eine Nacht opposite Pasquale Aleardi and the ensemble disaster film Heroes. While the former became a critical and commercial flop, Heroes earned strong ratings though it was mostly panned by critics. In November 2013, Catterfeld's sixth album Lieber so was released. It debuted at number twenty-one on the German Albums Chart, marking her sixth consecutive top forty entry.

=== 2014–present ===
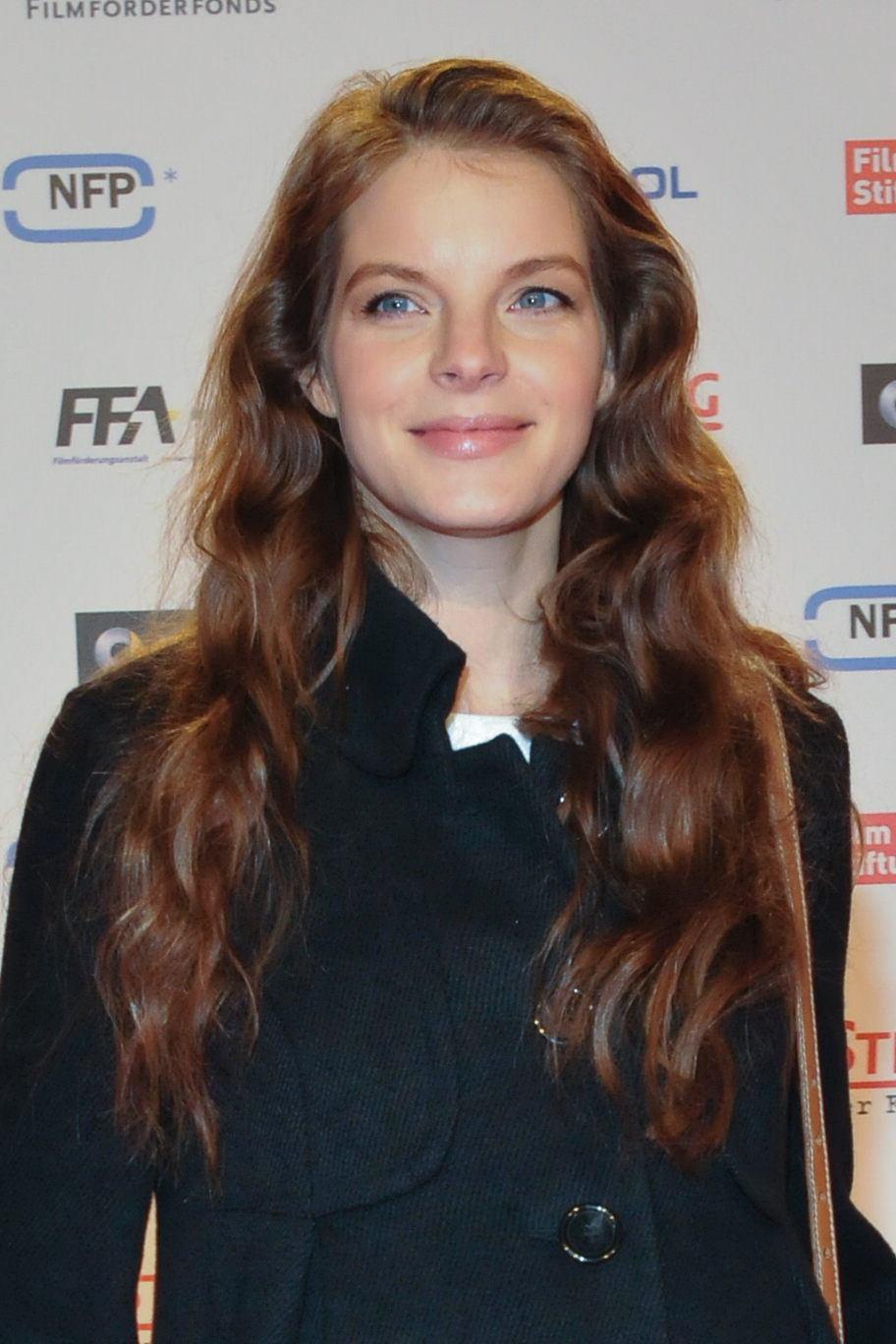
Catterfeld at a Cologne film premiere in 2014

Catterfeld rejected the offer to appear in Fast & Furious 6 (2013) to portray a princess in the Franco-German romantic film Beauty and the Beast starring Léa Seydoux and Vincent Cassel. The film was screened out of competition at the 64th Berlin International Film Festival, and released to positive reviews, becoming a box office success. It was nominated for the People's Choice Award for Best European Film at the 27th European Film Awards, and received three nominations at the 40th César Awards. Also in 2014, Catterfeld starred in the lead role of Amelia in the television films Zwischen Himmel und hier and Mein ganzes halbes Leben, which she had filmed back-to-back in Ireland the year before. Based on a treatment by Irish novelist Cecelia Ahern, the films were broadcast to strong ratings as part of ZDF's Herzkino series. She also appeared in the film adaptation of Dora Heldt's 2013 novel Herzlichen Glückwunsch, Sie haben gewonnen!, which became another commercial success, and had a minor role in the comedy film Bocksprünge.

In mid-2015, Catterfeld participated in the second season of the reality television series Sing meinen Song - Das Tauschkonzert, the German version of the series The Best Singers. Her appearance on the show was accompanied by the re-release of Lieber so, which eventually surpassed its initial peak and reached number eight on the German Albums Chart, becoming her highest-charting album in a decade. Her rendition of Andreas Bourani's song "Hey" reached the top twenty in Germany based on downloads alone and became highest-charting release in years. In August, Catterfeld represented Thuringia in the Bundesvision Song Contest 2015 with her single "Lieber so", placing third in the contest with 114 points.

Catterfeld starred alongside Eliza Bennett, Rosemary Harris, and Matthew Macfadyen in the international co-production The von Trapp Family: A Life of Music, released in November 2015. A remake of the 1956 German film that in turn inspired the Broadway musical The Sound of Music (1959) and the 1965 film of the same name, she plays Maria von Trapp, the stepmother and matriarch of the Trapp Family Singers. Critics dismissed the film as "clichéd heimatfilm". In 2016, Catterfeld appeared in the role of Nora Pilaster in the ZDF mini series A Dangerous Fortune, based on British author Ken Follett's 1993 novel A Dangerous Fortune. The same year, she began starring in the ARD police procedural television series Wolfsland opposite Götz Schubert, and served as a coach on the sixth season of the television series The Voice of Germany. In 2017, Catterfeld released her seventh album Guten Morgen Freiheit. Her highest-charting album since Unterwegs (2005), it debuted at number four on the Austrian and German Albums Chart, respectively, and peaked at number seven in Switzerland. In 2019, after three seasons with the show, Catterfeld announced her departure from The Voice.

== Personal life ==
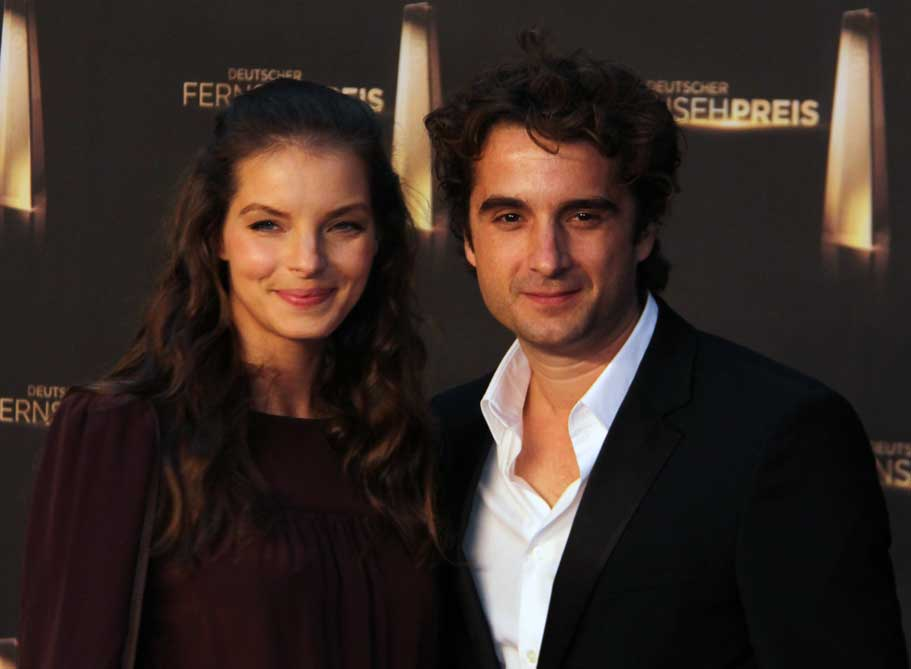
Catterfeld with partner Oliver Wnuk at the Deutscher Fernsehpreis 2012

From 2004 to 2007 Catterfeld had a relationship with actor Wayne Carpendale. In late 2007, she started dating author and actor Oliver Wnuk, after having met on the set of their film U-900. Their son, Charlie, was born on 19 April 2014. They filed for divorce in 2021.

== Discography ==
=== Studio albums ===
- Meine Welt (2003)
- Farben meiner Welt (2004)
- Unterwegs (2005)
- Aura (2006)
- Blau im Blau (2010)
- Lieber so (2013)
- Guten Morgen Freiheit (2017)
- Change (2021)
- Move (2025)

== Filmography ==
=== Film ===
Film
Year	Title	Role	Notes
2004	Shark Tale	Angie (voice)	German version
2007	Rabbit Without Ears	herself	
2008	U-900	Maria	
2009	Lilly the Witch: The Dragon and the Magic Book	Hübsche Blondine	
2009	Rabbit Without Ears 2	herself	
2010	Life Is Too Long	Caro Will	
2012	Little Brother, Big Trouble: A Christmas Adventure	Wilma	German version
2013	Strana khoroshikh detochek		
2013	Sputnik	Katharina Bode	
2014	Beauty and the Beast	Princess	
2014	The Pirate Fairy	Zarina	German version
2014	Bocksprünge	Eva	
2015	The von Trapp Family: A Life of Music	Maria von Trapp	
2018	Tabaluga	Princess Lilli	

=== Television ===
Television
Year	Title	Role	Notes
2001–2005	Gute Zeiten, schlechte Zeiten	Julia Blum	Main role
2005	Hallo Robbie!	Kerstin Steinhage	Episode: "Schicksalhafte Begegnung"
2005	Tatort – Der Name der Orchidee	Junge Frau auf Balkon	Television film
2005–2006	Sophie – Braut wider Willen	Countess Sophie von Ahlen	Main role
2007	Wenn Liebe doch so einfach wär	Katrina Lang	Television film
2008	SOKO 5113	Tiffany Tanner	Episode: "Seifenoper"
2008	The Secret of the Königssee	Marla Hofer/Nora Schiller	Television film
2009	Schatten der Gerechtigkeit	Maria Teiss	Television film
2009	Volcano	Daniela Eisenach	Two-part television film
2009	Engel sucht Liebe	Laura Dierksen	Television film
2010	Die Frau des Schläfers	Karla Ben Yakin	Television film
2011	The Promise	Ziphora	Miniseries
2011	Am Ende die Hoffnung	Ellen Ludwig	Television film
2011	The Girl at the Bottom of the Sea	Lotte Hass	Television film
2011	Nils Holgerssons wunderbare Reise	Gans Daunenfein (voice)	Television film
2012	Plötzlich 70!	Melanie Müller	Television film
2012	Nur eine Nacht	Ina Grede	Television film
2013	Heroes	Andrea Weber	Television film
2014	Zwischen Himmel und hier	Amelia	Television film
2014	Mein ganzes halbes Leben	Amelia	Television film
2014	Herzlichen Glückwunsch, Sie haben gewonnen!	Johanna Jäger	Television film

== Awards and nominations ==
Year	Award	Category	Result
2003	Bambi Awards	Shooting-Star	Won
2003	Goldene Stimmgabel	Erfolgreichste Solistin Pop	Won
2003	Goldener Wuschel	Shooting Star des Jahres	Won
2003	Bravo Otto	TV-Star weiblich	Won
2004	Berliner Bär	Pop	Won
2004	Echo	Künstlerin National Rock/Pop	Won
2004	Echo	Nationaler Nachwuchs-Preis der Deutschen Phono-Akademie (Meine Welt)	Nominated
2004	Echo	Newcomer-Video National ("Für dich")	Nominated
2004	Echo	Rock-Pop-Single des Jahres national ("Für dich")	Nominated
2004	Bravo Otto	TV-Star weiblich	Won
2005	Echo	Künstlerin des Jahres (national)	Nominated
2007	Echo	Künstlerin des Jahres (national)	Nominated
2008	Undine Awards	Best Young Comedian	Nominated
2012	Jupiter Awards	Best German TV Actress	Nominated
2012	Romy	Favorite Actress	Nominated
