= Sasha (German singer) discography =

Sasha discography
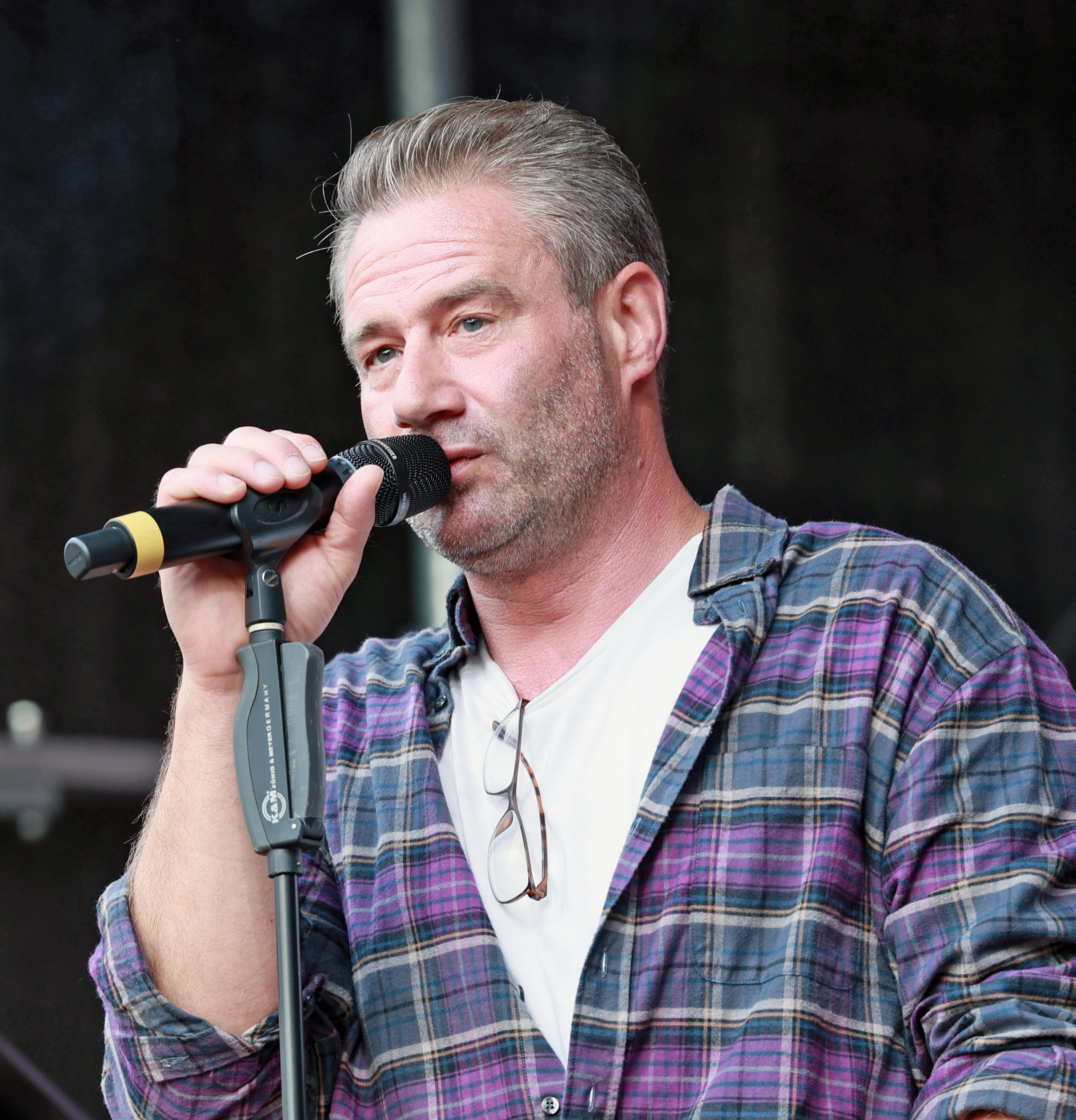
- Sasha on-stage in 2023.
- Studio albums: 10
- Soundtrack albums: 1
- Compilation albums: 1
- Singles: 26

German pop singer Sasha has released ten studio albums, one compilation album, and 17 singles. Originally a backing vocalist, Sasha started his career as the chorus voice for virtual eurodance projects and rap acts such as Sir Prize and Der Wolf. Following a successful feature with rapper Young Deenay, he released his debut album Dedicated to... on Warner Music in the fall of 1998. The album became a major success around Europe, selling more than 400,000 copies in Germany alone, and produced four singles, including "If You Believe", which would become his highest-charting single to date, receiving one platinum and four gold discs. His second album, ...you (2000), was less successful on most international territories but manifested his success throughout German-speaking Europe and was certified double gold by the IFPI. Sasha's third studio album, Surfin' on a Backbeat, was released in 2003 and spawned four singles, including 2002 FIFA World Cup hymn "This Is My Time".

By 2003, Sasha started performing as his alter ego Dick Brave, the lead singer of a rockabilly band called Dick Brave & The Backbeats. Originally conceived as a humorous lark, the quintet released an album called Dick This! (2003) together, which eventually became the singer's first number-one record, and produced a remake of 1961's "Take Good Care of My Baby" as a single. Following the project's discontinuation and a two years-hiatus, Sasha released Open Water in 2006. The album became his lowest-selling effort to date, and produced two moderately successful singles only. His first Greatest Hits compilation was released in late 2006.

== Albums ==
=== Studio albums ===
List of albums, with selected chart positions and certifications
Title	Album details	Peak chart positions									Certifications
Title	Album details	GER	AUT	BEL	FIN	ITA	NL	NOR	POR	SWI	Certifications
Dedicated to...	Released: 16 November 1998; Label: WEA; Formats: CD	4	2	32	19	20	23	8	10	10	IFPI GER: Platinum; AFP: Gold; FIMI: Gold; IFPI AUT: Gold; IFPI CZE: Gold; IFPI DEN: Gold; IFPI SWI: Gold
...you	Released: 2 May 2000; Label: WEA; Formats: CD	2	5	—	—	—	—	—	—	4	GER: Gold
Surfin' on a Backbeat	Released: 12 November 2001; Label: WEA; Formats: CD	7	63	—	—	—	—	—	—	32	GER: Gold
Open Water	Released: 2 February 2006; Label: Warner Music; Formats: CD, digital download	7	24	—	—	—	—	—	—	36	
Good News on a Bad Day	Released: 27 February 2009; Label: Warner Music; Formats: CD, digital download	3	18	—	—	—	—	—	—	33	
The One	Released: 5 December 2014; Label: Sony Music Columbia; Formats: CD, digital download	18	—	—	—	—	—	—	—	59	
Schlüsselkind	Released: 13 April 2018; Label: Sony Music Columbia; Formats: CD, digital download	4	18	—	—	—	—	—	—	38	
This Is My Time. This Is My Life.	Released: 8 September 2023; Label: Sony Music Columbia; Formats: CD, digital download	9	29	—	—	—	—	—	—	—	

==== As Dick Brave ====
List of albums, with selected chart positions and certifications
Title	Album details	Peak chart positions			Certifications
Title	Album details	GER	AUT	SWI	Certifications
Dick This	Released: 3 November 2003; Label: Warner Music; Formats: CD, digital download	1	10	18	GER: 2× Platinum
Rock'n'Roll Therapy	Released: 14 October 2011; Label: Sony Music RCA; Formats: CD, digital download	7	18	18	GER: Gold
Back for Good	Released: 23 January 2026; Label: Stars by Edel; Formats: CD, download, vinyl	4	14	96	
Comin' Home for Christmas	Released: 27 November 2026; Label: Stars by Edel; Formats: CD, download, vinyl	To be released			

=== Compilation albums ===
List of albums, with selected chart positions and certifications
Title	Album details	Peak chart positions			Certifications
Title	Album details	GER	AUT	SWI	Certifications
Greatest Hits	Released: 1 December 2006; Label: Warner Music; Formats: CD, digital download	6	35	42	GER: Platinum

== Singles ==
=== As lead artist ===
Title	Year	Chart positions								Certifications	Album
Title	Year	GER	AUT	BEL	FIN	ITA	NL	SWE	SWI	Certifications	Album
"I'm Still Waitin'" (featuring Young Deenay)	1998	14	16	—	—	—	—	—	18		Dedicated to...
"If You Believe"	1998	3	2	2	—	3	2	15	4	GER: Platinum; AUT: Gold; BEL: Gold; NVPI: Gold; FIMI: Gold	Dedicated to...
"We Can Leave the World"	1999	10	8	23	—	—	—	72	8		Dedicated to...
"I Feel Lonely"	1999	9	14	—	2	—	29	—	8	GER: Gold	Dedicated to...
"Let Me Be the One"	2000	13	24	—	—	—	90	—	16		...you
"Chemical Reaction"	2000	29	39	—	—	—	—	—	32		...you
"Owner of My Heart"	2000	31	54	—	—	—	—	—	61		...you
"Here She Comes Again"	2001	26	43	—	—	—	—	—	42		Surfin' on a Backbeat
"Turn It into Something Special"	2002	35	—	—	—	—	—	—	—		Surfin' on a Backbeat
"This Is My Time"	2002	13	—	—	—	—	—	—	27		Surfin' on a Backbeat
"Rooftop"	2002	54	—	—	—	—	—	—			Surfin' on a Backbeat
"Take Good Care of My Baby" (as Dick Brave)	2004	21	52	—	—	—	—	—	—		Dick This
"Slowly"	2006	26	16	—	—	—	—	—	56		Open Water
"Goodbye"	2006	36	—	—	—	—	—	—	77		Open Water
"Coming Home"	2006	10	24	—	—	—	—	—	—		Greatest Hits
"Lucky Day"	2007	12	18	—	—	—	—	—	—		Greatest Hits
"Hide & Seek"	2007	8	33	—	—	—	—	—	63		Greatest Hits
"Please Please Please"	2009	22	37	—	—	—	—	—	—		Good News on a Bad Day
"There She Goes"	2009	—	—	—	—	—	—	—	—		Good News on a Bad Day
"On the Run"	2009	82	—	—	—	—	—	—	—		Non-album single
"Father and Son" (with Bully)	2009	64	—	—	—	—	—	—	—		Vicky the Viking soundtrack
"Wide Awake" (with Maria Mena)	2009	68	—	—	—	—	—	—	—		Lila, Lila soundtrack
"Just Can't Get Enough" (as Dick Brave)	2011	—	—	—	—	—	—	—	—		Rock'n'Roll Therapy
"Zieh die Schuh' aus"	2014	—	21	—	—	—	—	—	—		Sing meinen Song - Das Tauschkonzert
"Good Days"	2014	38	—	—	—	—	—	—	—		The One
"The One"	2015	—	—	—	—	—	—	—	—		The One
"Enjoy the Ride"	2015	—	—	—	—	—	—	—	—		The One
"Du fängst mich ein"	2018	—	—	—	—	—	—	—	—	—	Schlüsselkind
"Polaroid"	2018	—	—	—	—	—	—	—	—	—	Schlüsselkind
"Genug ist genug"	2018	—	—	—	—	—	—	—	—	—	Schlüsselkind

=== As featured artist ===
Year	Title	Chart positions							Album
Year	Title	GER	AUT	BEL	FIN	NL	SWE	SWI	Album
1997	"Walk on By" (Young Deenay feat. Sasha) (uncredited)	5	—	—	—	—	—	—	Birth
1998	"Wanna Be Your Lover" (Young Deenay feat. Sasha)	7	12	—	—	—	—	11	Birth
2001	"Gib mir Musik" (as part of Edo Zanki & Friends)	44	68	—	—	—	—	61	Die Ganze Zeit
2003	"Wunder geschehen" (as part of Nena & Friends)	9	26	—	—	—	—	88	Nena feat. Nena
2021	"Hypa Hypa" (Electric Callboy feat. Sasha)	—	—	—	—	—	—	—	MMXX - Hypa Hypa Edition

== Miscellaneous ==
=== Appearances ===
Year	Title	Album
1997	"Walk on By" (Young Deenay feat. Sasha) (uncredited)	Birth
1998	"Wanna Be Your Lover" (Young Deenay feat. Sasha)	Birth
2001	"Gib Mir Musik" (Edo Zanki & Friends)	Die Ganze Zeit
2001	"El Burro" (Sasha meets Mittermeier)	Mittermeier & Friends
2003	"Wunder Geschehen" (Nena & Friends)	Nena feat. Nena
2007	"Hide & Seek"	Das Geheimnis der Geisterinsel soundtrack
2009	"Father and Son" (with Bully)	Vicky the Viking soundtrack

== DVDs ==
Year	Album	Chart positions						
Year	Album	GER	AUT	BEL	FIN	NL	NOR	SWI
2002	Livebeats: 2002 live concert in Offenbach; Released: 17 June 2002; Formats: DVD, VHS, DVD-Audio	—	—	—	—	—	—	—
2004	We Want Dick! – Live at Limelight: 2003 live concert in Cologne; Released: 1 March 2004; Formats: DVD	55	—	—	—	—	—	—
"—" denotes releases that did not chart.
