= Greatest Hits (Sasha album) =

Greatest hits album by Sasha
- Released: 1 December 2006
- Recorded: 1998–2006
- Length: 60:33
- Label: Warner
- Producer: Grant Michael B., Dick Brave, Barber, Boyd, Robin Grubert, Pomez di Lorenzo, Sascha Schmitz, Pete Smith, Alexander Zuckowski

Sasha chronology
Open Water (2006)	Greatest Hits (2006)	Good News on a Bad Day (2009)

Singles from Greatest Hits
- 1. "Coming Home" Released: 2006; 2. "Lucky Day" Released: 2007; 3. "Hide & Seek" Released: 2007

Greatest Hits is the first compilation album by German pop singer Sasha. It was released by Warner Music on 1 December 2006 in German-speaking Europe.

== Promotion ==
"Coming Home" became the 85th best-selling single of 2007. "Lucky Day" was the 66th best-selling single of 2007.

== Critical reception ==
Professional ratings
Review scores
Source	Rating
CDStarts	8/10

In her review for CDStarts, Tanja Kraus found that "Sasha's critics always accuse him of being arbitrary and overly catchy in a boring way, but his musical shifts in style prove the opposite. Anyone who listens to this collection of pop gems will be pleasantly surprised by how good it sounds. The newly mentioned songs put the icing on the cake of Sasha’s undeniable quality, as they clearly showcase the artist’s musical development."

== Track listing ==
Greatest Hits track listing
No.	Title	Writer(s)	Producer(s)	Length
1.	"Coming Home" (original radio version)	Sascha Schmitz; Robin Grubert; Alexander Zuckowski	Sasha; Grubert; Zuckowski	3:09
2.	"If You Believe" (radio mix)	Grant Michael B.; Pomez di Lorenzo; Pete Smith	Michael B.; di Lorenzo	3:57
3.	"Slowly" (radio mix)	Schmitz; Grubert; Peter Sagurna; Ali Zuckowski	Smith; Fabio Trentini^{[a]}	4:06
4.	"I Feel Lonely" (European Broadcast version)	Buchanan; Buena; Range; Lipsey; Cameron McVey	Rockstar	3:35
5.	"Rooftop" (new radio version)	Schmitz; Michael B.; di Lorenzo; Pete Smith	Smith; Michael B.; di Lorenzo	3:33
6.	"Owner of My Heart"	Michael B.; di Lorenzo; Smith	Michael B.; di Lorenzo	3:40
7.	"This Is My Time" (radio cut)	Schmitz; Cosmo Klein; Kai Lee; Michael B.; di Lorenzo	Michael B.; di Lorenzo	3:37
8.	"Take Good Care of My Baby" (Dick Brave & The Backbeats)	Carole King; Gerry Goffin	Smith; Dick Brave	2:28
9.	"Lucky Day"	Schmitz; Grubert; Zuckowski	Sasha; Grubert; Zuckowski	3:16
10.	"Turn It into Something Special" (radio cut)	Michael B.; di Lorenzo; Smith; Ronnie Louise Taheny	Smith; Michael B.; di Lorenzo	3:31
11.	"Let Me Be the One" (radio version)	Michael B.; di Lorenzo; Smith	Michael B.; di Lorenzo	3:37
12.	"Here She Comes Again"	Schmitz; Michael B.; di Lorenzo; Smith	Smith	3:54
13.	"I'm Still Waitin'" (unreleased version)	Michael B.; di Lorenzo	Michael B.; di Lorenzo	4:02
14.	"Chemical Reaction" (new radio mix)	Michael B.; di Lorenzo; Smith	Michael B.; di Lorenzo	3:24
15.	"Walk This Way" (Dick Brave & The Backbeats)	Steven Tyler; Joe Perry	Smith; Brave	2:49
16.	"We Can Leave the World" (radio cut)	Michael B.; di Lorenzo; Smith	Michael B.; di Lorenzo	3:47
17.	"Goodbye" (new radio mix)	Schmitz; Grubert; Zuckowski; David Jost	Smith; Trentini^{[a]}	3:42
Total length:				60:33

Notes

- ^{^[a]} denotes co-producer(s)

=== Special edition (2CD) ===
CD1 same as regular edition

CD2

1. If You Believe (New Version 2006)
2. I Feel Lonely (New Version 2006)
3. We Can Leave The World (New Version 2006)
4. This Is My Time (New Version 2006)
5. Rooftop (Remixed New Version 2006)
6. Happy X-mas (War Is Over)
7. Coming Home (X-mas Version)
8. Rooftop (Live 2006)
9. Slowly (Live 2006)

=== Platin edition (CD+DVD) ===
8 June 2007 released

CD same as regular edition

DVD

1. If you believe (Live mit dem Babelsberger Filmorchester)
2. Miracle mile (Live mit dem Babelsberger Filmorchester)
3. I feel lonely (Live mit dem Babelsberger Filmorchester)
4. Good things (Live mit dem Babelsberger Filmorchester)
5. Slowly
6. Breathe
7. This is my time
8. Owner of my heart (Live mit dem Babelsberger Filmorchester)
9. We can leave the world (Live mit dem Babelsberger Filmorchester)
10. Turn It Into Something Special (Live mit dem Babelsberger Filmorchester)
11. Rooftop (Live mit dem Babelsberger Filmorchester)
12. Goodbye (Live mit dem Babelsberger Filmorchester)
13. Coming Home
14. How do you know (Live mit dem Babelsberger Filmorchester)

=== New edition (2CD) ===
16 November 2007 released

CD1

1. Hide & Seek

CD1 tracks 2–18 same as regular edition

CD2 same as special edition CD2

== Charts ==
=== Weekly charts ===
Weekly chart performance for Greatest Hits
Chart (2006)	Peak position
Austrian Albums (Ö3 Austria)	35
German Albums (Offizielle Top 100)	6
Swiss Albums (Schweizer Hitparade)	42

=== Year-end charts ===
Year-end chart performance for Greatest Hits
Chart (2007)	Position
German Albums (Offizielle Top 100)	23

== Certifications ==
Certifications for Greatest Hits
Region	Certification	Certified units/sales
Germany (BVMI)	Platinum	200,000^{^}
^{^} Shipments figures based on certification alone.
