= Freigeistin =

Studio album by Sarah Connor
- Released: 23 May 2025
- Genre: Pop
- Length: 53:32
- Label: Polydor
- Producer: Sarah Connor; Djorkaeff; Yoshi; Phil the Beat; Elias Hadjeus; Jumpa; Menju; Thilo Brandt; Nicolas Rebscher; Tobias Kuhn; Philipp Steinke; Juh-Dee

Sarah Connor chronology
Not So Silent Night (2022)	Freigeistin (2025)

Singles from Freigeistin
- 1. "Heut' ist alles gut" Released: 14 February 2025; 2. "Ficka" Released: 10 April 2025; 3. "Wilde Nächte" Released: 15 May 2025

Freigeistin (German for "free spirit") is the twelfth studio album by German singer Sarah Connor. It was released on 23 May 2025 through Polydor. The album marks her third full-length German-language release and her first in over six years, following Herz Kraft Werke (2019).

Critics generally viewed Freigeistin positively, praising its authenticity and Connor's confident use of her own language, even if it wasn't seen as groundbreaking or consistently strong. While some noted the album could feel overlong or uneven, her powerful voice and heartfelt delivery were widely appreciated. Commercially, the album performed very well, debuting at number one in Germany and Austria and reaching number two in Switzerland.

== Background and themes ==
The title Freigeistin, which translates to "free spirit," describes how Connor feels and thinks about certain issues. "Escaping" and "awakening" are the main themes of the album, referring to the limited space she was given since starting her career and becoming a mother soon after. Now that her children have grown up, the singer has been able to break free from this "density."

Connor delves into a variety of personal themes on the album, including her relationship with her husband and manager Florian Fischer, which is prominently featured on the lead single "Heut' ist alles gut" as well as on tracks like "For Life" and "Tief wie das Meer". For the first time in her career, she finds herself confronting criticism and engages with haters, a theme explored in the second single "Ficka." Throughout the album, Connor also reflects on life's challenges, from her children leaving home to exploring a female love interest. Other themes include her passion for freediving and commitment to marine conservation.

== Critical reception ==
Professional ratings
Review scores
Source	Rating
laut.de	2/5 stars
Plattentests	4/10

Miriam Amro, writing for Der Spiegel, considered the album a success, featuring music that feels "surprisingly uncalculated" this time. The writers of the Kölner Stadt-Anzeiger felt that while the music was neither particularly "meaningful" nor "revolutionary", it was "authentic" and made "with heart" from start to finish. Sven Kabelitz from laut.de felt that Freigeistin "may not be a major breakthrough, but Connor now feels confident enough in her own language that her tenth album ranks among her better works. The songs aren't always undeniably strong, but they're always full of honesty, heart, and passion." Plattentests editor Christopher Sennfelder concluded that "it is difficult to truly dislike Sarah Connor: despite an overlong and occasionally uneven Freigeistin, her strong voice and polished, risk-averse pop sensibility ultimately prevail."

== Chart performance ==
Freigeistin debuted at number one on the German Albums Chart in the week of 30 May 2025, becoming Connor's fourth consecutive and fifth overall studio album to do so. The album also opened atop the Austrian Albums Chart. It was Connor's second project to reach number one after Herz Kraft Werke (2019). In Switzerland, Freigeistin debuted at number two on the Swiss Albums Chart, becoming her highest-charting effort since Muttersprache (2015).

== Track listing ==
Freigeistin track listing
No.	Title	Writer(s)	Producer(s)	Length
1.	"Heut' ist alles gut"	Sarah Connor; Djorkaeff; Yoshi	Connor; Djorkaeff; Yoshi	3:09
2.	"Wilde Nächte"	Connor; Djorkaeff; Phil the Beat; Elias Hadjeus	Connor; Djorkaeff; Phil the Beat	2:28
3.	"Souvenir"	Connor; Takt32; Jumpa; Chris James	Jumpa; Connor	2:32
4.	"Ficka"	Connor; Djorkaeff; Phil the Beat; Menju	Connor; Djorkaeff; Phil the Beat; Menju	2:24
5.	"Geiles Leben"	Connor; Phil the Beat; Djorkaeff; Thilo Brandt	Phil the Beat; Djorkaeff; Connor	3:08
6.	"Schlechte Idee"	Connor; Nicolas Rebscher	Rebscher; Connor	2:07
7.	"My French Girlfriend"	Connor; Tobias Kuhn	Kuhn	2:44
8.	"Ich liebe dich"	Connor; Kuhn	Kuhn	3:41
9.	"Warum sind wir so?"	Connor; Yoshi; Djorkaeff; James	Yoshi; Djorkaeff; Connor	3:10
10.	"Warum hat mir keiner gesagt?"	Connor; Kuhn	Connor; Kuhn; Philipp Steinke	3:54
11.	"Herzen in Aufruhr"	Connor; Phil the Beat; Djorkaeff	Phil the Beat; Djorkaeff; Connor	3:37
12.	"Hölle"	Connor; Juh-Dee	Juh-Dee; Connor	2:28
13.	"For Life"	Connor; Yoshi; Djorkaeff; James	Yoshi; Djorkaeff; Connor	2:33
14.	"Die Fremde"	Connor; Kuhn	Kuhn	3:45
15.	"Du bist da draußen"	Connor; Kuhn	Kuhn; Connor	4:12
16.	"Für immer bei dir"	Connor; Kuhn	Kuhn; Connor	4:10
17.	"Tief wie das Meer"	Connor; Rebscher	Rebscher	3:24
Total length:				53:32

== Charts ==
=== Weekly charts ===
Weekly chart performance for Freigeistin
Chart (2025)	Peak position
Austrian Albums (Ö3 Austria)	1
German Albums (Offizielle Top 100)	1
Swiss Albums (Schweizer Hitparade)	2

=== Year-end charts ===
Year-end chart performance for Freigeistin
Chart (2025)	Position
Austrian Albums (Ö3 Austria)	72

== Release history ==
Release dates and formats for Freigeistin
Region	Date	Edition(s)	Format(s)	Label	Ref.
Various	23 May 2025	Standard	CD; LP; digital download; streaming	Polydor	
Various	5 March 2026	Special deluxe	CD; LP; digital download; streaming	Polydor	
