= Sasha discography =

Sasha discography may refer to:

- Sasha (DJ) discography
- Sasha (German singer) discography
