= Lucky Day =

Lucky Day may refer to:

== Music ==
=== Albums ===
- Lucky Day (album), a 2002 album by Shaggy, or the title song
- Lucky Day, an album by Jonathan Edwards

=== Songs ===
- "Lucky Day" (1926 song), a song written by De Sylva, Brown, and Henderson and recorded by Judy Garland (1956) and Ruth Olay (1959)
- "Lucky Day" (Nicola Roberts song)
- "Lucky Day" (Sasha song)
- "Lucky Day", a 1971 song by the Rascals from The Island of Real
- "Lucky Day", a song by Sasha from Greatest Hits
- "Lucky Day", a song by Thompson Twins from We Are Detective
- "Lucky Day", a song by Tom Waits from The Black Rider

== Film and television ==
- A Lucky Day, a 2002 Argentine and Italian film by Sandra Gugliotta
- Lucky Day, a 2002 television film based on a story by Mary Higgins Clark
- Lucky Day, a 2019 film written and directed by Roger Avary
- Lucky Day, a character in Three Amigos
- "Lucky Day" (Doctor Who), an episode of the 2025 season of Doctor Who

== Other uses ==
- Lucky Day (lottery game), an Iowa state lottery game

== See also ==
- Lucky Daye (born 1985), an American singer-songwriter
- My Lucky Day (disambiguation)
