= Lucky Days =

Lucky Days may refer to:

- Lucky Days (TV series), a 2010 Taiwanese television series
- Lucky Days (film), a 1935 British comedy film
- "Lucky Days" (song), a 2008 song by SS501

== See also ==
- Lucky Day (disambiguation)
