= My Lucky Day =

My Lucky Day may refer to:

- "My Lucky Day" (Bruce Springsteen song), 2008
- "My Lucky Day" (Chicago Fire), a television episode
- "My Lucky Day" (DoReDoS song), represented Moldova in Eurovision 2018
- "My Lucky Day" (The Killing), a television episode
- "My Lucky Day" (Scrubs), a television episode

== See also ==
- Lucky Day (disambiguation)
