= Coming Home (Sasha song) =

Single by Sasha

from the album Greatest Hits
- Released: 24 November 2006
- Genre: Christmas; pop; doo-wop
- Length: 3:09
- Label: Warner
- Songwriter(s): Robin Grubert; Sascha Schmitz; Alexander Zuckowski
- Producer(s): Robin Grubert; Sascha Schmitz; Alexander Zuckowski

Sasha singles chronology
"Goodbye" (2006)	"Coming Home" (2006)	"Lucky Day" (2007)

"Coming Home" is a song by German singer Sasha. It was written and produced by Sasha along with Robin Grubert and Alexander Zuckowski for Sasha's first compilation album Greatest Hits (2006). Released as the album's lead single, it reached the top ten of the German Singles Chart.

== Track listing ==
CD maxi single
No.	Title	Length
1.	"Coming Home" (Original Radio Version)	3:07
2.	"Coming Home" (X-mas Radio Version)	2:59
3.	"Coming Home" (Acapella Karaoke Version)	2:59
4.	"I Feel Lonely" (New Version 2006)	4:52

== Charts ==
=== Weekly charts ===
Chart (2006)	Peak position
Austria (Ö3 Austria Top 40)	24
Germany (GfK)	10

=== Year-end charts ===
Chart (2007)	Position
Germany (Official German Charts)	85
