= Muttersprache (album) =

Studio album by Sarah Connor
- Released: 22 May 2015
- Genre: Pop; R&B
- Length: 46:31
- Label: Polydor; Universal
- Producer: Connor; Beatzarre; Thilo Brandt; Djorkaeff; Daniel Faust; Michael Herberger; Swen Meyer; Xavier Naidoo; Peter Plate; Ulf Leo Sommer; Ali Zuckowski

Sarah Connor chronology
Real Love (2010)	Muttersprache (2015)	Herz Kraft Werke (2019)

Singles from Muttersprache
- 1. "Wie schön du bist" Released: 1 May 2015; 2. "Bedingungslos" Released: 11 September 2015; 3. "Kommst du mit ihr" Released: 4 March 2016; 4. "Bonnie & Clyde" Released: 23 September 2016; 5. "Augen auf" Released: 18 November 2016

Muttersprache (English: "Native language", literally "mother tongue") is the ninth studio album by German recording artist Sarah Connor, released by Polydor Records on 22 May 2015. It is her first album to be primarily recorded in German. After her participation in the reality television series Sing meinen Song - Das Tauschkonzert in 2014, the German version of the series The Best Singers, Connor was encouraged to record songs in German. Muttersprache debuted on top of on the German Albums Chart, marking her second number-one album following 2005's Naughty but Nice. Muttersprache is primarily a pop and R&B album.

== Promotion ==
Selected as the album's leading single, "Wie schön du bist" was released to radios and stores on May 1, 2015. An instant success in German-speaking Europe, it peaked at number two on the German Singles Chart. In Germany, the song became Connor's highest-charting single since 2005 number-one hit "From Zero to Hero." It was eventually certified platinum by the Bundesverband Musikindustrie (BVMI). In Austria and Switzerland, "Wie schön du bist" reached number eleven and number thirty on the national singles charts, where it became her biggest-charting single in seven years.

== Critical reception ==
Professional ratings
Review scores
Source	Rating
CDStarts	6/10
laut.de	2/5 stars

laut.de critic Sven Kabelitz rated the album two out of five stars. He found that "unfortunately, the lyrics linger on the level of late Rosenstolz, while using the same phrasing machine and the sentimentalism of Juli, Silbermond and Luxuslärm for long stretches." Kabelitz described Muttersprache as "sentimental feel-good banalities from the literary cat calendar, in which everyone and no one can find themselves." Matthias Reichel from CDStarts described Connor's switch to German as a "very bold step" that ultimately "works," enabling her to express herself more directly and without taboos. He called the album a "solid comeback" and noted that it never becomes "truly embarrassing," despite its emotional and personal themes. Overall, he concludes she is "on the right path," with nothing essential missing from her new direction. Writing for Süddeutsche Zeitung, Johanna Bruckner viewed Connor's German-language shift as risky but with "hit potential." She criticized "these rhymes" as often simplistic and "annoying," and concluded she is "if anything, the better Helene Fischer."

== Chart performance ==
Upon its release, Muttersprache debuted at number-one on the German Albums Chart. It marked Connor's ninth consecutive top ten album and second effort to reach the top position following the number-one debut of 2005's Naughty but Nice, her fourth studio album. With first week sales of more than 100,000 copies in Germany, Muttersprache was certified gold by the Bundesverband Musikindustrie (BVMI) just days after its release. It has since been certified triple platinum.

In Austria, Muttersprache debuted at number three on the Austrian Albums Chart behind both Conchita Wurst's Conchita and Andreas Gabalier's Mountain Man. It became Connor's highest-charting album since Naughty but Nice which also peaked at number three a decade earlier. In Switzerland, the album debuted at number-one on the Swiss Albums Chart, her first album to do so.

== Track listing ==
Muttersprache – Standard edition
No.	Title	Writer(s)	Producer(s)	Length
1.	"Mit vollen Händen"	Connor; Daniel Faust; Peter Plate; Ulf Leo Sommer	Connor; Faust; Plate; Sommer	3:48
2.	"Wie schön du bist"	Connor; Faust; Plate; Sommer	Connor; Faust; Plate; Sommer	3:38
3.	"Halt mich"	Connor; Faust; Plate; Sommer	Connor; Faust; Plate; Sommer	3:10
4.	"Bedingungslos"	Connor; Faust; Plate; Sommer	Connor; Faust; Plate; Sommer	3:52
5.	"Kommst du mit ihr"	Connor; Faust; Plate; Sommer	Connor; Faust; Plate; Sommer	3:24
6.	"Mein König"	Connor; Faust; Plate; Sommer	Connor; Faust; Plate; Sommer	4:13
7.	"Augen auf"	Connor; Faust; Plate; Sommer	Connor; Faust; Plate; Sommer	4:30
8.	"Deutsches Liebeslied"	Connor; Faust; Plate; Sommer	Connor; Faust; Plate; Sommer	4:46
9.	"Versprochen"	Connor; Faust; Plate; Sommer	Connor; Faust; Plate; Sommer	3:47
10.	"Anorak"	Connor; Faust; Plate; Sommer	Connor; Faust; Plate; Sommer	4:02
11.	"Meine Insel"	Connor; Thilo Brandt; Pille Hillebrand	Connor; Brandt	2:50
12.	"Wenn Du da bist"	Connor; Simon Triebel; Ali Zuckowski	Connor; Zuckowski	3:24
13.	"Das Leben ist schön"	Connor; Triebel; Zuckowski	Connor; Zuckowski	3:17

Muttersprache – Deluxe edition (Disc 2)
No.	Title	Writer(s)	Producer(s)	Length
1.	"Wie geht glücklich"	Connor; Plate; Sommer; Carolina Bigge	Connor; Faust; Plate; Sommer	4:14
2.	"Keiner ist wie Du" (from Sing meinen Song – Das Tauschkonzert)	Gregor Meyle	Xavier Naidoo; Michael Herberger	4:00
3.	"Ich atme ein" (from Sing meinen Song – Das Tauschkonzert)	Frank Ramond; Matthias Hass	Naidoo; Herberger	3:10
4.	"I Feel Lonely" (from Sing meinen Song – Das Tauschkonzert)	Sascha Schmitz; Michel Bernhard Kersting; Stephan Baader	Naidoo; Herberger	3:30
5.	"Unlove You"	Connor; Konstantin Scherer; Silvia Gordon; Vincent Stein	Beatzarre; Djorkaeff	3:03
6.	"Come Home"	Connor; Scherer; Thilo Brandt; Stein	Beatzarre; Djorkaeff	2:39
7.	"Close to Crazy"	Connor; Scherer; Catt Gravitt; Stein	Beatzarre; Djorkaeff	3:32

Muttersprache – Special deluxe edition (Disc 2)
No.	Title	Writer(s)	Producer(s)	Length
1.	"Bonnie & Clyde" (with Henning Wehland)	Connor; Wehland; Brandt	Connor; Swen Meyer	3:12
2.	"Die mit Dir lacht"	Connor; Brandt	Connor; Christian Lohr	3:02
3.	"Warum du"	Connor; Scherer; Nico Santos; Stein	Beatzarre; Djorkaeff	3:23
4.	"Wie geht glücklich"	Connor; Plate; Sommer; Bigge	Connor; Faust; Plate; Sommer	4:14
5.	"Keiner ist wie Du" (from Sing meinen Song – Das Tauschkonzert)	Meyle	Naidoo; Herberger	4:00
6.	"Ich atme ein" (from Sing meinen Song – Das Tauschkonzert)	Ramond; Hass	Naidoo; Herberger	3:10
7.	"I'll Be By Your Side" (featuring Gregory Porter)	Connor; Brandt	Connor; Lohr	4:54
8.	"The World Needs Us"	Connor; Lynne Marti	Connor; Lohr	2:47
9.	"Little Love"	Connor; Duncan Townsend	Connor; Lohr	2:57
10.	"Unlove You"	Connor; Scherer; Gordon; Stein	Beatzarre; Djorkaeff	3:03
11.	"Come Home"	Connor; Scherer; Brandt; Stein	Beatzarre; Djorkaeff	2:39
12.	"Close to Crazy"	Connor; Scherer; Gravitt; Stein	Beatzarre; Djorkaeff	3:32
13.	"I Feel Lonely" (from Sing meinen Song – Das Tauschkonzert)	Schmitz; Kersting; Baader	Naidoo; Herberger	3:30

Muttersprache – Limited special edition (Disc 2)
No.	Title	Writer(s)	Producer(s)	Length
1.	"Wie geht glücklich"	Connor; Plate; Sommer; Bigge	Connor; Faust; Plate; Sommer	4:14
2.	"Keiner ist wie Du" (from Sing meinen Song – Das Tauschkonzert)	Meyle	Naidoo; Herberger	4:00
3.	"Ich atme ein" (from Sing meinen Song – Das Tauschkonzert)	Ramond; Hass	Naidoo; Herberger	3:10
4.	"I Feel Lonely" (from Sing meinen Song – Das Tauschkonzert)	Schmitz; Kersting; Baader	Naidoo; Herberger	3:30
5.	"I'm Falling Down"	Connor; Scherer; Stein	Beatzarre; Djorkaeff	3:25
6.	"Naked"	Connor; Drew Lawrence; Robert Kleiner	Beatzarre; Djorkaeff	3:48
7.	"Best Friend"	Connor; Scherer; Gordon; Stein	Beatzarre; Djorkaeff	2:37
8.	"Das Leben ist schön" (live)	Connor; Triebel; Zuckowski	Connor; Zuckowski	3:20
9.	"Bedingungslos" (live)	Connor; Faust; Plate; Sommer	Connor; Faust; Plate; Sommer	4:09
10.	"Kommst du mit ihr" (live)	Connor; Faust; Plate; Sommer	Connor; Faust; Plate; Sommer	4:07
11.	"Wie schön du bist" (live)	Connor; Faust; Plate; Sommer	Connor; Faust; Plate; Sommer	5:5
12.	"Mein König" (live)	Connor; Faust; Plate; Sommer	Connor; Faust; Plate; Sommer	5:16
13.	"Augen auf" (live)	Connor; Faust; Plate; Sommer	Connor; Faust; Plate; Sommer	7:00

== Charts ==
=== Weekly charts ===
Weekly chart performance for Muttersprache
Chart (2015)	Peak position
Austrian Albums (Ö3 Austria)	3
German Albums (Offizielle Top 100)	1
Swiss Albums (Schweizer Hitparade)	1

=== Year-end charts ===
Year-end chart performance for Muttersprache
Chart (2015)	Position
Austrian Albums (Ö3 Austria)	7
German Albums (Offizielle Top 100)	3
Swiss Albums (Schweizer Hitparade)	23
Chart (2016)	Position
Austrian Albums (Ö3 Austria)	31
German Albums (Offizielle Top 100)	7
Swiss Albums (Schweizer Hitparade)	42
Chart (2017)	Position
German Albums (Offizielle Top 100)	100

=== Decade-end charts ===
Decade-end chart performance for Muttersprache
Chart (2010–2019)	Position
German Albums (Offizielle Top 100)	10

== Certifications and sales ==
Certifications for Muttersprache
Region	Certification	Certified units/sales
Austria (IFPI Austria)	2× Platinum	30,000^{*}
Germany (BVMI)	11× Gold	1,100,000^{‡}
^{*} Sales figures based on certification alone.^{‡} Sales+streaming figures based on certification alone.

== Release history ==
Release dates and formats for Muttersprache
Region	Date	Edition(s)	Format(s)	Label	Ref.
Austria	May 22, 2015	Standard; deluxe	Digital download; CD	Polydor; Universal	
Germany	May 22, 2015	Standard; deluxe	Digital download; CD	Polydor; Universal	
Switzerland	May 22, 2015	Standard; deluxe	Digital download; CD	Polydor; Universal	
Austria	November 4, 2016	Special deluxe; limited special	Digital download; CD	Polydor; Universal	
Germany	November 4, 2016	Special deluxe; limited special	Digital download; CD	Polydor; Universal	
Switzerland	November 4, 2016	Special deluxe; limited special	Digital download; CD	Polydor; Universal	
