= Bedingungslos =

Single by Sarah Connor

from the album Muttersprache
- Released: 4 November 2015
- Length: 3:52
- Label: Polydor
- Songwriters: Sarah Connor; Daniel Faust; Peter Plate; Ulf Leo Sommer
- Producers: Connor; Faust; Plate; Sommer

Sarah Connor singles chronology
"Wie schön du bist" (2015)	"Bedingungslos" (2015)	"Kommst du mit ihr" (2016)

"Bedingungslos" (English: Unconditionally) is a song by German recording artist Sarah Connor. It was written and produced by Connor along with Peter Plate, Ulf Leo Sommer, and Daniel Faust for her ninth studio album Muttersprache (2015). An orchestra-driven pop ballad, the song was released as the album's second single on 4 November in German-speaking Europe, where it reached the top forty on both the German and Swiss Singles Chart.

== Music video ==
A music video for "Bedingungslos," filmed in 2025, was directed by Gregor Erler.

== Track listings ==
Remix EP
No.	Title	Length
1.	"Bedingungslos" (Radio Edit)	3:32
2.	"Bedingungslos" (Rico Bernasconi Remix Edit)	3:57
3.	"Bedingungslos" (Achtabahn Remix Edit)	3:18
4.	"Bedingungslos" (Rico Bernasconi Remix)	5:27
5.	"Bedingungslos" (Achtabahn Remix)	4:30

== Charts ==
Weekly chart performance for "Bedingungslos"
Chart (2015)	Peak position
Austria (Ö3 Austria Top 40)	38
Germany (GfK)	30

== Certifications ==
Certifications for "Bedingungslos"
Region	Certification	Certified units/sales
Germany (BVMI)	Gold	200,000^{‡}
^{‡} Sales+streaming figures based on certification alone.
