= Augen auf =

Single by Sarah Connor

from the album Muttersprache
- Released: 18 November 2016
- Genre: Pop
- Length: 4:30
- Label: Polydor
- Songwriters: Sarah Connor; Daniel Faust; Peter Plate; Ulf Leo Sommer
- Producers: Connor; Faust; Plate; Sommer

Sarah Connor singles chronology
"Bonnie & Clyde" (2016)	"Augen auf" (2016)	"Vincent" (2019)

"Augen auf" (German: Eyes Opened) is a song by German recording artist Sarah Connor. It was written and produced by Connor along with Daniel Faust, Peter Plate, and Ulf Leo Sommer for her ninth studio album Muttersprache (2016).

== Formats and track listings ==
CD single
No.	Title	Length
1.	"Augen auf" (Album version)	4:30
2.	"Augen auf" (Live)	4:31

== Charts ==
Chart (2016)	Peak position
Germany (GfK)	87
