= I'm Still Waitin' =

Single by Sasha featuring Young Deenay

from the album Dedicated to...
- Released: 22 June 1998
- Genre: Pop; reggae fusion
- Length: 3:57
- Label: Warner Music
- Songwriter(s): Grant Michael B.; Pomez di Lorenzo; Sascha Schmitz
- Producer(s): Pomez di Lorenzo; Grant Michael B.

Sasha singles chronology
"Wanna Be Your Lover" (1998)	"I'm Still Waitin'" (1998)	"If You Believe" (1998)

"I'm Still Waitin'" is the debut single recorded by German singer Sasha, featuring rapper Young Deenay. It was written by Sasha along with Grant Michael B. and Pomez di Lorenzo for Sasha's debut studio album Dedicated to... (1998), while production was helmed by the latter two. Their third consecutive collaboration following "Walk on By" and "Wanna Be Your Lover", it was their first song to feature Deenay as the guest vocalist. Warner Music released the reggae-influenced mid-tempo song as the lead single from Dedicated to... on 22 June 1998. It became a top 20 success in Austria, Germany and Switzerland.

== Formats and track listings ==
CD maxi single
No.	Title	Length
1.	"I'm Still Waitin'" (Radio Version)	3:53
2.	"I'm Still Waitin'" (Classic Reggae Radio)	3:49
3.	"I'm Still Waitin'" (Gettin Down Mix)	5:09
4.	"I'm Still Waitin'" (Extended Version)	4:46
5.	"I'm Still Waitin'" (Wicked Reggae Mix)	5:02
6.	"I'm Still Waitin'" (Video Version)	3:29
7.	"I'm Still Waitin'" (Instrumental Version)	3:29

== Credits and personnel ==
Credits adapted from the liner notes of Dedicated to...

- Music and lyrics – Pomez di Lorenzo, Grant Michael B.
- Lead and backing vocals – Sasha
- Rap – Young Deenay
- Mixing – Falk Moller, Michael B.

== Charts ==
=== Weekly charts ===
Chart (1998)	Peak position
Austria (Ö3 Austria Top 40)	16
Germany (GfK)	14
Switzerland (Schweizer Hitparade)	18

=== Year-end charts ===
Chart (1998)	Position
Germany (Official German Charts)	57
