= Schlüsselkind =

Studio album by Sasha
- Released: 13 April 2018
- Length: 49:18
- Label: xray; Polydor
- Producer: Beatgees; Robin Grubert; Michael Herberger; Ricardo Munoz; Xavier Naidoo; Patrick Pyke Salmy; Kaspar Wiens

Sasha chronology
The One (2014)	Schlüsselkind (2018)	This Is My Time. This Is My Life. (2023)

Schlüsselkind (German for "latchkey kid") is the seventh regular studio album by German singer Sasha. It was released by xray Entertainment and Polydor Records on 13 April 2018 in German-speaking Europe. Conceived after his participation in the reality television series Sing meinen Song – Das Tauschkonzert, the German version of the series The Best Singers, in 2014, it is his first album to be primarily recorded in German. Upon its release, Schlüsselkind debuted at number four on the German Albums Chart, becoming his highest-charting project since 2009's Good News on a Bad Day.

== Critical reception ==
Professional ratings
Review scores
Source	Rating
laut.de	2/5 stars

Sven Kabelitz from laut.de felt that "thanks to Sasha's Teflon image, the switch to singing in German on Schlüsselkind goes largely unnoticed. Before you know it, you forget he ever sang in English. The price for this: from now on, he blends seamlessly into the faceless crowd of "song poets" whose album ads are as unremarkable as those of the Trivago guy or the Check24 family." Highly critical of Sasha's decision to record music in German due to its profane lyrics, Die Zeit critic Oskar Piegsa declared the album the "latest nadir of the 1990s revival." Piegsa was more enthusiastic about the technical aspects of the album, writing: "It's all a bit slickly produced, but so shamelessly cobbled together from half a century of pop history that it’s an absolute joy."

== Commercial performance ==
In Germany, Schlüsselkind opened and peaked at number four on the German Albums Chart in the week of 20 April 2018. It marked the singer's eighth top ten album (including his two Dick Brave albums) in Germany as well as his highest-charting project since 2009's Good News on a Bad Day. In Austria, the album debuted and peaked at number 18 on the Austrian Albums Chart, mirroring the performance of Good News on a Bad Day in 2009. In Switzerland, Schlüsselkind reached number 38 on the Swiss Albums Chart. It would remain two further weeks on the chart.

== Track listing ==
Schlüsselkind – Standard edition
No.	Title	Writer(s)	Producer(s)	Length
1.	"Weiße Weste"	Robin Grubert; Sera Finale	Grubert	3:16
2.	"Polaroid"	Sasha; Martin Fliegenschmidt; David Jürgens; Ali Zuckowski	Kaspar Wiens; Grubert	3:50
3.	"Du fängst mich ein"	Sasha; Nico Suave; Ricardo Munoz; Patrick Pyke Salmy; Alex Saenda	Grubert	3:53
4.	"Immer wie immer"	Sasha; Grubert; Zuckowski; Beatgees; Klaas Heufer-Umlauf	Grubert	4:01
5.	"Genug ist genug"	Sasha; Suave; Munoz; Salmy; Simon Allert	Grubert	3:23
6.	"Der Junge"	Sasha; Fliegenschmidt; Jürgens; Zuckowski	Grubert	3:30
7.	"Schlüsselkind"	Sasha; Grubert; Zuckowski	Grubert	2:52
8.	"Leben danach"	Sasha; Fliegenschmidt; Jürgens; Zuckowski	Grubert	3:46
9.	"Gorilla"	Sasha; Suave; Beatgees; Saenda	Beatgees	3:31
10.	"Nichtgeschwindigkeit"	Sasha; Suave; Munoz; Salmy; Julia Röntgen	Grubert	3:21
11.	"Jekyll & Hyde"	Sasha; Fliegenschmidt; Jürgens; Zuckowski	Grubert	4:01
12.	"Zwei Herzen"	Benjamin Bistram; Elias Hadjeus	Grubert	3:35
13.	"Frohes neues Ja"	Sasha; Finale; Beatgees	Beatgees	3:25
14.	"Bauch voller Lieder"	Sasha; Fliegenschmidt; Zuckowski	Grubert	2:55
Total length:				49:18

Schlüsselkind – Deluxe edition (Disc 2)
No.	Title	Writer(s)	Producer(s)	Length
1.	"Schlüsselkind" (featuring Nico Suave)	Sasha; Suave; Grubert; Zuckowski	Grubert	3:04
2.	"Lebenszeichen"	Sasha; Grubert; Zuckowski	Beatgees	3:21
3.	"Guter Tag"	Sasha; Munoz; Salmy; Suave	Munoz; Salmy	4:04
4.	"Freunde fürs Leben"	Sasha; Grubert; Zuckowski	Grubert	3:09
5.	"Bei meiner Seele" (from Sing meinen Song – Das Tauschkonzert)	Xavier Naidoo; Jules Kalmbacher	Naidoo; Michael Herberger	3:32
6.	"Zieh die Schuh' aus" (from Sing meinen Song – Das Tauschkonzert)	Frank Ramond; Matthias Hass	Naidoo; Herberger	3:36
7.	"Hörst du mich" (from Sing meinen Song – Das Tauschkonzert)	Gregor Meyle	Naidoo; Michael Herberger	3:35
8.	"Lass mich dein Pirat sein" (from Nena – Nichts versäumt)	Nena Kerner; Rolf Brendel		3:43

== Charts ==
Weekly chart performance for Schlüsselkind
Chart (2018)	Peak position
Austrian Albums (Ö3 Austria)	18
German Albums (Offizielle Top 100)	4
Swiss Albums (Schweizer Hitparade)	38
