= Kommst du mit ihr =

Single by Sarah Connor

from the album Muttersprache
- B-side: "Go, Get Your Girl!"
- Released: 4 March 2016
- Length: 3:24
- Label: Polydor
- Songwriters: Sarah Connor; Daniel Faust; Peter Plate; Ulf Leo Sommer
- Producers: Connor; Faust; Plate; Sommer

Sarah Connor singles chronology
"Bedingungslos" (2015)	"Kommst du mit ihr" (2016)	"Bonnie & Clyde" (2016)

"Kommst du mit ihr" (English: Are you coming with her?) is a song by German pop singer Sarah Connor. It was written and produced by Connor along with Peter Plate, Ulf Leo Sommer, and Daniel Faust for her ninth studio album Muttersprache (2015). The song was released as the album's third single on 4 March 2016 in German-speaking Europe.

== Track listings ==
2-Track CD single
No.	Title	Length
1.	"Kommst du mit ihr"	3:24
2.	"Go, Get Your Girl!"	4:02

Die Mixe — Remix single
No.	Title	Length
1.	"Kommst du mit ihr" (B-Case Radio Remix)	2:59
2.	"Kommst du mit ihr" (Milk & Sugar Club Radio Mix)	3:12
3.	"Go, Get Your Girl!"	4:02
4.	"Kommst du mit ihr" (Funky House Remix)	3:44
5.	"Kommst du mit ihr" (Dayne S. Radio Mix)	3:01
6.	"Kommst du mit ihr" (Alltag Radio Mix)	2:57
7.	"Kommst du mit ihr" (B-Case Extended Remix)	4:57
8.	"Kommst du mit ihr" (Milk & Sugar Extended Club Remix)	5:22
9.	"Kommst du mit ihr" (Dayne S Extended Remix)	4:47
10.	"Kommst du mit ihr" (Alltag Extended Remix)	5:30

== Charts ==
Weekly chart performance for "Kommst du mit ihr"
Chart (2015)	Peak position
Germany (GfK)	62

== Certifications ==
Certifications for "Kommst du mit ihr"
Region	Certification	Certified units/sales
Germany (BVMI)	Gold	200,000^{‡}
^{‡} Sales+streaming figures based on certification alone.
