= Wie schön du bist =

Single by Sarah Connor

from the album Muttersprache
- Released: 1 May 2015
- Length: 3:39
- Label: Polydor
- Songwriters: Sarah Connor; Daniel Faust; Peter Plate; Ulf Leo Sommer
- Producers: Connor; Faust; Plate; Sommer

Sarah Connor singles chronology
"Real Love" (2010)	"Wie schön du bist" (2015)	"Bedingungslos" (2015)

"Wie schön du bist" (English: How Beautiful You Are) is a song by German recording artist Sarah Connor. It was written and produced by Connor along with Peter Plate, Ulf Leo Sommer, and Daniel Faust for her ninth studio album Muttersprache (2015). An ode to her son Tyler, the uplifting pop ballad was conceived after a dispute with him. Her first single in German, the song was released as the album's lead single on 1 May 2015 in German-speaking Europe; it has since reached number two on the German Singles Chart.

== Background ==
"I'll Kiss It Away" was written by Connor along with Daniel Faust, Peter Plate, Ulf Leo Sommer for her ninth studio album, Sexy as Hell (2008).

== Chart performance ==
In Germany, "Wie schön du bist" was certified gold by the Bundesverband Musikindustrie (BVMI), denoting sales/streams of 260,000 copies, including 240,000 digital downloads.

== Parody ==
In September 2015, German comedian Carolin Kebekus performed a parody of this song in her show PussyTerror TV, mocking dim-witted German nationalists under the title "Wie blöd du bist" (English: How Daft You Are).

== Track listing ==
CD single
No.	Title	Writer(s)	Producer(s)	Length
1.	"Wie schön du bist"	Sarah Connor; Daniel Faust; Peter Plate; Ulf Leo Sommer	Connor; Faust; Plate; Sommer	3:39
2.	"Das Leben ist schön"	Connor; Simon Triebel; Ali Zuckowski	Connor; Zuckowski	3:18

== Charts ==
=== Weekly charts ===
Weekly chart performance for "Wie schön du bist"
Chart (2015)	Peak position
Austria (Ö3 Austria Top 40)	11
Germany (GfK)	2
Switzerland (Schweizer Hitparade)	30

=== Year-end charts ===
Year-end chart performance for "Wie schön du bist"
Chart (2015)	Position
Germany (Official German Charts)	13

== Certifications ==
Certifications for "Wie schön du bist"
Region	Certification	Certified units/sales
Germany (BVMI)	3× Gold	600,000^{‡}
^{‡} Sales+streaming figures based on certification alone.
