= This Is My Time (song) =

2002 single by Sasha

Single by Sasha

from the album Surfin' on a Backbeat
- Released: 24 June 2002
- Genre: Pop; pop rock
- Length: 3:37
- Label: WEA
- Songwriter(s): Grant Michael B.; Cosmo Klein; Kai Kumpann; Pomez di Lorenzo; Pete Boyd Smith; Sascha Schmitz
- Producer(s): Pomez di Lorenzo; Grant Michael B.

Sasha singles chronology
"Turn It into Something Special" (2000)	"This Is My Time" (2002)	"Rooftop" (2000)

"This Is My Time" is a song by German singer Sasha.

== Music video ==
The music video for the song was filmed at the Westfalenstadion in Dortmund. Professional footballers Sebastian Kehl and Christoph Metzelder appear in the clip. It was premiered on 19 May 2002 on German television broadcasting station Sat.1.

== Formats and track listings ==
CD maxi single
No.	Title	Length
1.	"This Is My Time" (radio cut)	3:37
2.	"This Is My Time" (acoustic mix)	3:57
3.	"This Is My Time" (original version)	4:25
4.	"This Is My Time" (instrumental)	3:43
5.	"We Can Leave the World" (live version)	5:26

== Charts ==
=== Weekly charts ===
Chart (2002)	Peak position
Germany (GfK)	13
Switzerland (Schweizer Hitparade)	27
