= Open Water (album) =

Studio album by Sasha
- Released: 3 March 2006
- Recorded: 2005–2006
- Genre: Pop, rock
- Length: 47:53
- Label: Warner Music
- Producer: Grant Michael B., Barber, Boyd, Pomez di Lorenzo, Pete Smith

Sasha chronology
Dick This! (2003)	Open Water (2006)	Greatest Hits (2006)

Singles from Open Water
- 1. "Slowly" Released: 2006; 2. "Goodbye" Released: 2006

Professional ratings
Review scores
Source	Rating
laut.de	3/5 stars

Open Water is the fourth regular studio album by German pop singer Sasha, released by Warner Music on 3 March 2006 in German-speaking Europe.

Although the album charted significantly higher than its predecessor Surfin' on a Backbeat (2001) throughout Europe, reaching number seven on the German Albums Chart and the top forty in Austria and Switzerland, it failed to match its sales, eventually becoming Sasha's lowest-selling album, to date. Open Water produced two singles only, including "Slowly" and "Goodbye."

== Track listing ==
1. "I'm Alive" — 3:51
2. "Automatic" — 3:40
3. "Slowly" — 4:17
4. "Different Me" — 3:57
5. "Open Water" — 3:33
6. "Breathe" — 4:31
7. "Paralyzed" — 4:08
8. "Miracle Mile" — 2:58
9. "Good Things" — 3:36
10. "How Do You Know" — 4:20
11. "Wake the Sun" — 5:23
12. "Goodbye" — 3:33

== Charts ==
=== Weekly charts ===
Chart (2006)	Peak position
Austrian Albums (Ö3 Austria)	24
German Albums (Offizielle Top 100)	7
Swiss Albums (Schweizer Hitparade)	36
