= Real Love (Sarah Connor album) =

Studio album by Sarah Connor
- Released: 22 October 2010
- Length: 55:25 (standard edition); 66:33 (deluxe edition)
- Label: X-Cell
- Producer: Nalle Ahlstedt; Philippe-Marc Anquetil; BNA; Kay Denar; Björn Djupstrom; Alexander Geringas; Robin Grubert; Michelle Leonard; Erik Lewander; Radio Nation; Jaako Sakari Saalovaara; Lloyd Bentley Scott; Rob Tyger

Sarah Connor chronology
Sexy as Hell (2008)	Real Love (2010)	Muttersprache (2015)

Singles from Real Love
- 1. "Cold as Ice" Released: 5 October 2010; 2. "Real Love" Released: 10 December 2010

Real Love is the eighth studio album by German recording artist Sarah Connor. It was released by X-Cell Records, a division of the Universal Music Group, on 22 October 2010 in German-speaking Europe. Connor's first album in two years, it involves production by Alexander Geringas, Robin Grubert, Michelle Leonard, and Erik Lewander as well as her frequent contributors Kay Denar and Rob Tyger.

Released to a lukewarm reception by critics, the album debuted at number eight on the German Albums Chart and reached number fifteen and twenty-two in Austria and Switzerland respectively. Altogether, Real Love produced two singles, including "Cold as Ice," which reached the top twenty on the German Singles Chart, and its title track. Following the underperformance of the album and both of its singles, Connor went on a hiatus after which she would release the commercially successful German-language album Muttersprache in 2015. Connor would return to English-language material in 2022, with her second Christmas album Not So Silent Night.

== Background ==
In late 2008, Connor separated from her husband Marc Terenzi. In 2009, she was featured on the Central European version of Enrique Iglesias' song "Takin' Back My Love". Later that year, she released the song "Standing On Top Of The World" as a download, available through a code on Always packaging for a limited time. The song, retitled "Top Of The World", was then included on the deluxe edition of Real Love. In August of 2010, two months before the album's release, Connor made her relationship with Florian Fischer public.

== Critical reception ==
Professional ratings
Review scores
Source	Rating
CDStarts	3/10
laut.de	2/5 stars
Die Welt	1/5 stars

Real Love earned largely mixed to negative reviews from music critics. laut.de critic Sarah-Nina Rademacher wrote: "Known for her soulful powerhouse voice, Sarah pushes it to the limit on Real Love — only to run it through an aggressive electro filter. The result? Disco fox fit for a dance school, featuring horribly distorted, robotic vocals, wrapped in sticky pop and lukewarm beats [...] The conclusion is clear: it’s high time Sarah and her mentor George Glueck should go their separate ways." In his reviews for Die Welt, Michael Pilz noted that "not much has happened since "From Sarah with Love" nearly ten years ago [...] She's back to singing songs that often sound quite different from what their titles suggest — like the upbeat, sweaty "Cold As Ice," or "It Only Hurts When I Breathe," where all bravery drowns in self-pity."

Albert Ranner from CDStarts gave the album a 3/10 rating. He found that Real Love "doesn’t feel like a new album from the Delmenhorst native, but more like the debut of a talent show winner — one that puts a strong emphasis on variety without depth, in order to gauge audience feedback and use it to define a rough stylistic direction for future releases. Deep down, Sarah probably knows herself that she doesn't need to go through this process at all." In a positive review, MusikWoche wrote: "You can really hear and feel that this is a woman standing at a crossroads in her career — torn between celebrity life and music. And fortunately, she has now clearly chosen to prioritize the music."

== Commercial performance ==
In Germany, Real Love opened and peaked at number eight on the German Albums Chart. While it was her lowest-charting project since Key to My Soul (2003), it also marked Connor's seventh consecutive top ten album in her home country. In Austria, Real Love reached number 15 on the Austrian Albums Chart. It would remain three further weeks on the chart. In Switzerland, the album debuted and peaked at number 22, making it Connor's lowest charting album yet.

== Track listing ==
Real Love track listing
No.	Title	Writer(s)	Producer(s)	Length
1.	"Cold as Ice"	Rob Tyger; Kay Denar	Tyger; Denar	4:12
2.	"Carry Me Home"	Nalle Ahlstedt; Michelle Leonard; Jaakko Saalovaara	Ahlstedt; Leonard; Saalovaara	3:56
3.	"Leave with a Song"	Alex Cantrall; Dwight Watson; Erica Watson; Jonas Jeberg	Radio Nation	3:08
4.	"Real Love"	Alexander Geringas; Bernd Klimpel; Rike Boomgaarden; Charlie Mason	Geringas	3:08
5.	"Stand Up"	Hiten Bharadia; Björn Djupström; Dion Howell	Djupstrom	3:12
6.	"Break My Chains"	Tyger; Denar	Tyger; Denar	4:09
7.	"Can't Get Over You"	Tyger; Denar	Tyger; Denar	4:27
8.	"It Only Hurts When I Breathe"	Tyger; Denar	Tyger; Denar	3:50
9.	"Back from Your Love"	Bharadia; Philip Hochstrate; Emma Stakes	Philippe-Marc Anquetil	3:22
10.	"Time 2"	Bharadia; Anquetil; Christopher Lee-Joe; Sarah West	BNA	3:30
11.	"Rodeo"	Robin Grubert; Ali Zuckowski; Mason	Grubert	3:30
12.	"Better Man"	Lloyd Bentley Scott	Scott	3:20
13.	"Keep the Fire Burnin"	Tyger; Denar	Tyger; Denar	3:52
14.	"Miss U Too Much"	Tyger; Denar	Tyger; Denar	3:57
15.	"Soldier with a Broken Heart"	Sarah Connor; Erik Lewander; Hayden Bell; Bharadia	Lewander	3:51
Total length:				55:25

Deluxe Edition bonus tracks
No.	Title	Writer(s)	Producer(s)	Length
16.	"Top of the World"	Bharadia; Anquetil; Lee-Joe	BNA	3:13
17.	"This Is What It Feels Like"	Bharadia; Anquetil; Lee-Joe; Connor	BNA	3:52
18.	"In Love Alone"	Bharadia; Anquetil; Connor	BNA	4:05
Total length:				66:33

== Charts ==
Weekly chart performance for Real Love
Chart (2010)	Peak position
Austrian Albums (Ö3 Austria)	15
German Albums (Offizielle Top 100)	8
Swiss Albums (Schweizer Hitparade)	22

== Release history ==
Real Love release history
Region	Date	Format	Label	Ref(s)
Various	October 22, 2010	CD; Digital download	X-Cell	
