= Bonnie & Clyde (Sarah Connor and Henning Wehland song) =

Single by Sarah Connor & Henning Wehland

from the album Muttersprache
- Released: 23 September 2016
- Genre: Pop
- Length: 3:11
- Label: Polydor
- Songwriter(s): Sarah Connor; Henning Wehland; Thilo Brandt
- Producer(s): Connor; Swen Meyer

Sarah Connor singles chronology
"Kommst du mit ihr" (2016)	"Bonnie & Clyde" (2016)	"Augen auf" (2016)

"Bonnie & Clyde" is a duet by German recording artists Sarah Connor and Henning Wehland. It was recorded for the reissued deluxe edition of Connor's ninth studio album Muttersprache (2016).

== Formats and track listings ==
Download
No.	Title	Length
1.	"Bonnie & Clyde"	3:11

== Charts ==
=== Weekly charts ===
Chart (2016)	Peak position
Austria (Ö3 Austria Top 40)	39
Germany (GfK)	24
Switzerland (Schweizer Hitparade)	64

== Certifications ==
Region	Certification	Certified units/sales
Germany (BVMI)	Gold	200,000^{‡}
^{‡} Sales+streaming figures based on certification alone.
