= Not So Silent Night =

Studio album by Sarah Connor
- Released: 18 November 2022
- Length: 41:12
- Label: Polydor
- Producer: Sarah Connor; Tommy D; Kalli; Jules Kalmbacher; Nicolas Rebscher; Karsten Roeder; Jens Schneide; Jens Sprenger; Thomas Stieger; Max Wolfgang

Sarah Connor chronology
Herz Kraft Werke (2019)	Not So Silent Night (2022)	Freigeistin (2025)

Singles from Not So Silent Night
- 1. "Ring Out the Bells" Released: 4 November 2022

Not So Silent Night is the eleventh studio album by German singer Sarah Connor. It was released on 18 November 2022 by Polydor Records. Her second Christmas album after Christmas in My Heart (2005) and a follow-up to Herz Kraft Werke (2019), it marked Connor's first English language album since Real Love (2010). A breakaway from most modern Christmas albums, the album omits cover versions of Christmas standards and carols, but instead features twelve original songs, co-written by Connor.

The album earned generally mixed reviews from music critic. It debuted at number one on the German Albums Chart, becoming Connor's third consecutive and fourth overall studio album to do so, and also entered the top ten of the charts in Austria and the top 20 in Switzerland. The release of Not So Silent Night was preceded by lead single "Ring Out the Bells." A reissue, entitled Not So Silent Night – The Cozy Edition, featuring three news songs, was released in November 2023.

== Background ==
In 2019, Connor released her second German language album Herz Kraft Werke. It debuted at number one in both Austria and Germany, earning double platinum status in each country. After a period of not releasing any new albums, Connor aimed to release a concept album in 2022, although she was initially uncertain whether to record an album of children's songs or, 17 years after Christmas in My Heart, produce another Christmas album. She ultimately decided to pursue the latter and constulted her long-time collaborator Nicolas Rebscher to co-produce the album with her. Accompanied by a team of songwriters, including Max Wolfgang, Ali Zuckowski, Kelvin Jones, Nico Santos, and Kalli & Joe, they traveled to Santorini to spend one week each in January and February 2022 working on new songs at the Black Rock Studios. Although she had set out to approach the album as a broader collaborative effort, Connor was certain that it would be a Christmas album consisting of original songs — and that, following two German-language records, the lyrics should be in English once again.

== Promotion ==
On 13 November 2021, Connor released a new recording of the Robert Wells/Mel Tormé classic "The Christmas Song" and its music video as an Amazon Music original. The song, alongside "Don't You Know That It's Christmas", is included as a bonus track on the deluxe edition of the album. Connor had previously recorded and performed the song in two versions, the first one being included on her first Christmas album Christmas in My Heart in 2005, the second one being part of the Christmas show in the first season of the German TV Show Sing meinen Song – Das Tauschkonzert in 2014. On 4 November 2022, "Ring Out the Bells" was released as the album's first official single. In the weeks leading up to the album's release, several music videos were released to visually promote the album, including visuals for "Not So Silent Night", "Christmas 2066" and "Jolly Time of Year." As with the music video for "Ring Out the Bells," they were directed by Tatjana Wenig.

== Critical reception ==
Professional ratings
Review scores
Source	Rating
laut.de	2/5 stars
mix1	7/8
Plattentests	6/10
Vinylist	3/5 stars

In her review for laut.de, Kerstin Kratochwill wrote that "the perfectly polished pop" on Not So Silent Night "shines like an over-decorated Christmas tree." WDR 2 critic Oliver Rustemeyer found that Not So Silent Night is "also a typical Christmas album, but it not only sounds contemplative, but also wild and at least partly rocky." Enwie Kej from Der Vinylist found that "the flow and impulsiveness of the first three songs is lost on the rest of the album. Of course, the work impresses with Sarah Connor's incredible voice and with a different album title the expectations would probably have been different. This leaves a nice Christmas album." mix1 noted that "the new songs vary in sound from a Motown feel to messages of peace and a countdown to the turn of the year." Michael Albl from Plattentests felt that the "accolade for the finest Christmas album of the year rightfully belongs to none other than Sarah Connor." He added: "The twelve new tracks on Not So Silent Night tell stories that are at times amusing and at others touching, offering a musically diverse yet consistently coherent flow throughout the album. [...] As the finger instinctively returns to the "repeat" button, one can only tip their Christmas hat in appreciation and conclude that, for this year, the soundtrack to the festive season has been found."

== Chart performance ==
Not So Silent Night debuted at number one on the German Albums Chart in the week of 25 November 2022. It would mark Connor's third consecutive and fourth overall studio album to do so. GfK Entertainment ranked it 44th on its 2002 year-end chart. In November 2023, the album re-entered the chart at number eight, following the release of Not So Silent Night – The Cozy Edition. Elsewhere, it reached number seven in Austria and number 17 in Switzerland. It was Connor's eighth studio album to reach the top ten on the Austrian Albums Chart.

== Track listing ==
Not So Silent Night track listing
No.	Title	Writer(s)	Producer(s)	Length
1.	"Jolly Time of Year"	Connor; Zuckowski; Wolfgang	Connor; Nicolas Rebscher	2:03
2.	"Ring Out the Bells"	Connor; Nicolas Rebscher; Wolfgang	Connor; Rebscher	3:59
3.	"Not So Silent Night"	Connor; Zuckowski; Wolfgang	Connor; Rebscher; Wolfgang	2:45
4.	"Blame It On the Mistletoe"	Connor; Pascal Reinhardt; Joe Walter	Connor; Kalli	2:28
5.	"24th"	Connor; Rebscher; Wolfgang	Connor; Rebscher	3:24
6.	"(1, 2, 3, 4) Shots of Patron"	Connor; Nico Santos; Rebscher; Wolfgang	Connor; Rebscher	2:59
7.	"Christmas 2066"	Connor; Zuckowski; Wolfgang	Connor; Rebscher; Wolfgang	3:18
8.	"Santa, If You're There"	Connor; Reinhardt; Walter	Connor; Kalli	3:03
9.	"Quiet White"	Connor; Kelvin Jones; Wolfgang	Connor; Rebscher	3:56
10.	"Come Home"	Connor; Jones; Rebscher; Wolfgang	Connor; Rebscher	3:42
11.	"I Think I'm in Love with You"	Connor; Rebscher	Connor; Rebscher	3:04
Total length:				34:26

Deluxe Edition bonus tracks
No.	Title	Writer(s)	Producer(s)	Length
12.	"Don't You Know That It's Christmas"	Connor; Reinhardt; Walter	Connor; Kalli	2:31
13.	"The Christmas Song"	Robert Wells; Mel Tormé	Rebscher; Tommy D	4:15
Total length:				41:12

=== Not So Silent Night – The Cozy Edition ===
Disc 1
No.	Title	Writer(s)	Producer(s)	Length
1.	"Jolly Time of Year"	Connor; Zuckowski; Wolfgang	Connor; Rebscher	2:03
2.	"Ring Out the Bells"	Connor; Rebscher; Wolfgang	Connor; Rebscher	3:59
3.	"Christmas Train (Destination Hope)"	Connor; Zuckowski; Rebscher	Connor; Jules Kalmbacher; Jens Schneider; Thomas Stieger	3:39
4.	"Not So Silent Night"	Connor; Zuckowski; Wolfgang	Connor; Rebscher; Wolfgang	2:45
5.	"I Wonder" (featuring Naturally 7)	Connor; Zuckowski; Walter	Connor; Kalmbacher; Jens Sprenger	2:57
6.	"Blame It On the Mistletoe"	Connor; Reinhardt; Walter	Connor; Kalli	2:28
7.	"24th"	Connor; Rebscher; Wolfgang	Connor; Rebscher	3:24
8.	"(1, 2, 3, 4) Shots of Patron"	Connor; Santos; Rebscher; Wolfgang	Connor; Rebscher	2:59
9.	"Christmas 2066"	Connor; Zuckowski; Wolfgang	Connor; Rebscher; Wolfgang	3:18
10.	"Santa, If You're There"	Connor; Reinhardt; Walter	Connor; Kalli	3:03
11.	"Quiet White"	Connor; Jones; Wolfgang	Connor; Rebscher	3:56
12.	"Come Home"	Connor; Jones; Rebscher; Wolfgang	Connor; Rebscher	3:42
13.	"I Think I'm in Love with You"	Connor; Rebscher	Connor; Rebscher	3:04
14.	"Don't You Know That It's Christmas"	Connor; Reinhardt; Walter	Connor; Kalli	2:31
15.	"The Christmas Song"	Wells; Tormé	Rebscher; Tommy D	4:15
16.	"Happy New Year"	Connor; Zuckowski; Mia Aegerter; Martin Fliegenschmidt	Connor; Kalmbacher; Sprenger; Stieger	4:02

Disc 2
No.	Title	Writer(s)	Producer(s)	Length
1.	"Jolly Time of Year" (live 2022)	Connor; Zuckowski; Wolfgang	Karsten Roeder	2:33
2.	"Blame It On the Mistletoe" (live 2022)	Connor; Reinhardt; Walter	Roeder	2:35
3.	"The Christmas Song" (live 2022)	Wells; Tormé	Roeder	4:35
4.	"Sleigh Ride" (live 2022)	Leroy Anderson; Mitchell Parish	Roeder	2:56
5.	"The Best Side of Life" (live 2022)	Marc Lennard; Jojo HF	Roeder	3:55
6.	"24th" (live 2022)	Connor; Rebscher; Wolfgang	Roeder	3:47
7.	"Christmas 2066" (live 2022)	Connor; Zuckowski; Wolfgang	Roeder	3:22
8.	"Quiet White" (live 2022)	Connor; Jones; Wolfgang	Roeder	4:13
9.	"Christmas Medley" (live 2022)	Sammy Cahn; Jule Styne; Johnny Marks; Robert Alexander Anderson; James Lord Pierpont; Johnny Marks; J. Fred Coots; Haven Gillespie; Mariah Carey; Walter Afanasieff	Roeder	14:19
10.	"Santa, If You're There" (live 2022)	Connor; Reinhardt; Walter	Roeder	3:22
11.	"Come Home" (live 2022)	Connor; Jones; Rebscher; Wolfgang	Roeder	3:48
12.	"Don't You Know That It's Christmas" (live 2022)	Connor; Reinhardt; Walter	Roeder	3:49
13.	"(1, 2, 3, 4) Shots of Patron" (live 2022)	Connor; Santos; Rebscher; Wolfgang	Roeder	5:33
14.	"Ring Out the Bells" (live 2022)	Connor; Rebscher; Wolfgang	Roeder	6:01
15.	"Have Yourself a Merry Little Christmas" (live 2022)	Hugh Martin; Ralph Blane	Roeder	3:30
16.	"Christmas in My Heart" (live 2022)	Rob Tyger; Kay Denar	Roeder	5:40
17.	"Not So Silent Night" (live 2022)	Connor; Zuckowski; Wolfgang	Roeder	5:16
Total length:				131:16

Notes

- "Christmas Medley" comprises "Let It Snow! Let It Snow! Let It Snow!", "Rudolph the Red-Nosed Reindeer", "Mele Kalikimaka", "Jingle Bells", "Rockin' Around the Christmas Tree", "Santa Claus Is Comin' to Town", and "All I Want for Christmas Is You."

== Charts ==
=== Weekly charts ===
Weekly chart performance for Not So Silent Night
Chart (2022)	Peak position
Austrian Albums (Ö3 Austria)	7
German Albums (Offizielle Top 100)	1
Swiss Albums (Schweizer Hitparade)	17

=== Year-end charts ===
2022 year-end chart performance for Not So Silent Night
Chart (2022)	Position
German Albums (Offizielle Top 100)	44

2023 year-end chart performance for Not So Silent Night
Chart (2023)	Position
German Albums (Offizielle Top 100)	71

== Release history ==
Release dates and formats for Not So Silent Night
Region	Date	Edition(s)	Format(s)	Label	Ref.
Various	19 November 2022	Standard	CD; LP; digital download; streaming	Polydor	
Various	17 November 2023	The cozy edition	CD; LP; digital download; streaming	Polydor	
