= Vincent (Sarah Connor song) =

2019 pop song

Single by Sarah Connor

from the album Herz Kraft Werke
- Released: 5 April 2019
- Genre: Pop
- Length: 4:43
- Label: Polydor
- Songwriters: Sarah Connor; Peter Plate; Ulf Sommer

Sarah Connor singles chronology
"Augen auf" (2016)	"Vincent" (2019)	"Ich wünsch dir" (2019)

"Vincent" is a song by German singer Sarah Connor, released on 5 April 2019 by Polydor Records as the lead single from her tenth studio album Herz Kraft Werke. It was released along with the album announcement. Connor co-wrote the song with Peter Plate and Ulf Sommer.

== Background ==
Connor wrote the track after hearing from a mother that her teenage son had come out as gay. She said that the song "stands symbolically for all boys and girls in puberty, in search of orientation and identity". The name is fictitious.

== Critical and commercial reception ==
Idolator called the track a "soaring pop anthem".

On 12 April 2019 "Vincent" debuted in the German charts at number 29 before dropping down to number 77 by the middle of May, by which time the song had been censored or banned by some radio stations on account of the sexual content of its opening lyrics. Consistent with the Streisand effect the song subsequently rose to a peak position of number 9 as the track remained in the German charts for the rest of 2019.

== Promotion ==
Connor announced the track on her Instagram in early April 2019.

== Charts ==
=== Weekly charts ===
Chart (2019)	Peak position
Austria (Ö3 Austria Top 40)	2
Germany (GfK)	9
Switzerland (Schweizer Hitparade)	38

=== Year-end charts ===
Chart (2019)	Position
Austria (Ö3 Austria Top 40)	7
Germany (Official German Charts)	15

== Certifications ==
Region	Certification	Certified units/sales
Austria (IFPI Austria)	Platinum	30,000^{‡}
Germany (BVMI)	Platinum	400,000^{‡}
^{‡} Sales+streaming figures based on certification alone.
