= Cold as Ice (Sarah Connor song) =

Single by Sarah Connor

from the album Real Love
- Released: 8 October 2010
- Length: 4:12
- Label: X-Cell
- Songwriter(s): Rob Tyger; Kay Denar
- Producer(s): Tyger; Kay D.

Sarah Connor singles chronology
"Takin' Back My Love" (2009)	"Cold as Ice" (2010)	"Real Love" (2010)

"Cold as Ice" is a song by German recording artist Sarah Connor. A dance-pop song with slight contemporary R&B elements, it was written and produced by Kay Denar and Rob Tyger for Connor's seventh studio album, Real Love (2010). Released as the album's first single on 5 October 2010 in German-speaking Europe, the song peaked at number sixteen on the German Singles Chart and reached number twenty-seven in Austria, making it Connor's lowest-charting leading single to date. The song failed to chart in Switzerland.

== Track listings ==
CD, maxi-single
No.	Title	Writer(s)	Producer(s)	Length
1.	"Cold as Ice"	Rob Tyger; Kay Denar	Tyger; Denar	4:12
2.	"Cold as Ice" (PH Electro Remix)	Tyger; Denar	Tyger; Denar; Paul Hutsch^{[a]}	6:09

Digital single
No.	Title	Writer(s)	Producer(s)	Length
1.	"Cold as Ice"	Tyger; Denar	Tyger; Denar	4:12
2.	"Cold as Ice" (Extended Mix)	Tyger; Denar	Tyger; Denar	6:21
3.	"Cold as Ice" (PH Electro Remix)	Tyger; Denar	Tyger; Denar; Hutsch^{[a]}	6:09
4.	"Cold as Ice" (PH Electro Radio Edit)	Tyger; Denar	Tyger; Denar; Hutsch^{[a]}	3:53

Notes

- ^{^a} denotes additional producer

== Credits and personnel ==
- Vocals: Sarah Connor
- Writers: Rob Tyger, Kay Denar
- Publisher: George Glueck
- All music: Tyger, Denar
- Arrangement and recording: Tyger, Denar
- Mixing: Tyger, Denar
- Mastering: Tyger, Denar

== Charts ==
Chart (2010)	Peak position
Austria (Ö3 Austria Top 40)	27
Germany (GfK)	16
