= Rike Boomgaarden =

German singer and songwriter

- Birth name: Rike Boomgaarden
- Born: Hamburg, Germany
- Genres: Pop, Rock, EDM, J-pop
- Occupation(s): Singer, songwriter
- Instrument(s): Vocals, guitar, piano
- Years active: 2010–present

Rike Boomgaarden is a German singer and songwriter. She has written songs for many European and Japanese pop stars including Namie Amuro, Jolin Tsai, and Sarah Connor.

== Biography ==
Rike Boomgaarden began singing at age five and subsequently started learning to play various instruments. In her late teens, she started touring around Europe with several cover bands to gain exposure. During the intermittent breaks in her touring schedule, she began "demo singing" for various songwriting pitches. This eventually lead to her becoming a ghost singer for various major label projects throughout Europe.

Boomgaarden started crafting her own records for pitch with fellow songwriter Alex Geringas. Through these co-writings Rike was able to secure a publishing deal with Universal Music Publishing Group in 2010. Since 2010 she has written songs for Namie Amuro, Jolin Tsai, Sarah Connor (singer), BoA, Lidia Kopania, and Natalia.

== Discography ==
Year	Title	Artist	Album
2009	"Feeling”	Natalia (Belgian singer)	Wise Girl
2009	"I Don't Wanna Leave”	Lidia Kopania	Eurovision Song Contest 2009
2010	"Real Love”	Sarah Connor	Real Love
2010	"Believe in Love"	Anna Tsuchiya	Rule
2010	"In the Darkness”	Bis aufs Blut – Brüder auf Bewährung (Movie)	Bis aufs Blut-Original Motion Picture Soundtrack
2011	"La La La”	Debbi	Touch the Sun
2011	"Milestone”	BoA	‘’Who's Back’’
2012	"Fantasy"	Jolin Tsai	Muse
2012	"What have you done”	GEM	Xposed
2012	"Timeless”	After School	Flashback
2013	"Supernatural Love”	Namie Amuro	Feel
2013	"Sisters Forever”	Hanni & Nanni	Hanni & Nanni 3 Soundtrack
2015	"Supernatural Love" (re-release)	Namie Amuro	Namie Amuro: Live Style Deluxe edition 2015
