= Real Love (Sarah Connor song) =

Single by Sarah Connor

from the album Real Love
- Released: 7 December 2010
- Length: 3:08
- Label: X-Cell
- Songwriter(s): Alexander Geringas; Bernd Klimpel; Rike Boomgaarden; Charlie Mason
- Producer(s): Alexander Geringas

Sarah Connor singles chronology
| "Cold as Ice" (2010) | "Real Love" (2010) | "Wie schön du bist" (2015) |

"Real Love" is a song by German singer Sarah Connor from her same-titled eighth studio album (2010). It was written by Alexander Geringas, Bernd Klimpel, Rike Boomgaarden, and Charlie Mason and produced by the former. The piano-led pop ballad was released by X-Cell Records as the album's second single on 7 December 2010. A breakaway from parent album Real Love which largely deals with Connor's separation from her husband Marc Terenzi, "Real Love" was inspired by her relationship with Florian Fischer.

The song debuted and peaked at number 54 on the German Singles Chart and fell out of the top 100 in its third week, becoming Connor's first single to miss the top 30. Visuals for "Real Love," filmed by Oliver Sommer in Schwielowsee, depict Connor visiting her grandfather's abandoned house. The song would remain the singer's final English language single until the release of "Ring Out the Bells" twelve years later, as she has been performing in her native language German in the time between.

== Background ==
"Real Love" was by Alexander Geringas, Bernd Klimpel, Rike Boomgaarden, and Charlie Mason, while production was overseen by the former. Recorded late into the production of parent album Real Love, the song marked a departure for Connor, who up to that point had primarily recorded material telling of her separation from her husband Marc Terenzi. "Real Love" was largely inspired by her relationship with her manager, Florian Fischer, member of the 1990s pop group The Boyz. In October 2010, the singer told Bild: "Title song "Real Love" [...] was written a few months ago and my voice sounds brighter than it has for a long time. You can hear that it's the first time in a long time that I'm truly happily in love."

== Chart performance ==
"Real Love" was released by X-Cell Records on 7 December 2010 as the second and final single from Connor's eighth studio album Real Love (2010). It debuted and peaked at number 54 on the German Singles Chart in the week of 24 December 2010. This marked a considerable commercial decline from the singer's previous singles, all of who had reached the top 30 in Germany at least. The song would remain one further week inside the top 100 of the chart. It became Connor's first single to miss the Austrian Singles Chart.

== Music video ==
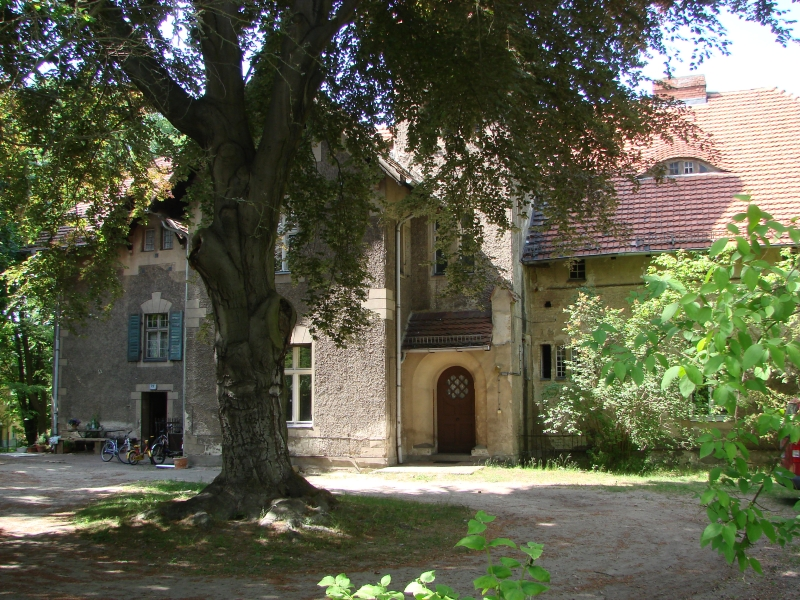
A building in Caputh, Brandenburg served as the video's main filming location.

Connor reteamed with frequent collaborator Oliver Sommer to film a music video for "Real Love". Produced by AVA Studios, much of the visuals were filmed on the shore of the Schwielowsee lake, particularly the village Caputh, a remote residential area, where a mansion in Schwielowseestraße served as the main filming location. In the video, Connor returns to her grandfather's abandoned house, where she recalls memories of their time together during her childhood.

== Track listings ==
Digital single
| No. | Title | Writer(s) | Producer(s) | Length |
|---|---|---|---|---|
| 1. | "Real Love" (Radio Mix) | Alexander Geringas; Bernd Klimpel; Rike Boomgaarden; Charlie Mason | Geringas | 3:30 |
| 2. | "Real Love" (Album Version) | Geringas; Klimpel; Boomgaarden; Mason | Geringas | 3:08 |
| 3. | "Real Love" (Lexland Radio Mix) | Geringas; Klimpel; Boomgaarden; Mason | Geringas | 3:10 |
| 4. | "Faded" | Sarah Connor; Erik Lewander; Hayden Belln | Lewander | 4:14 |

== Credits and personnel ==
Credits adapted from the liner notes of Real Love.

- Rike Boomgaarden – writer
- Kay Denar – recording engineer
- Alexander Geringas – mixing engineer, producer, writer
- Bernd Klimpel – writer
- Charlie Mason – writer
- Marc Schettler – mixing engineer
- Rob Tyger – recording engineer

== Charts ==
Weekly chart performance for "Real Love"
| Chart (2010) | Peak position |
|---|---|
| Germany (GfK) | 54 |

== Release history ==
Release dates and formats for "Real Love"
| Region | Date | Format | Label | Ref |
|---|---|---|---|---|
| Various | 7 December 2010 | Digital download; streaming | X-Cell Records | |
