= Turn It into Something Special =

Single by Sasha

from the album Surfin' on a Backbeat
- Released: 8 March 2002
- Genre: Pop; pop rock
- Length: 4:41
- Label: WEA
- Songwriter(s): S. Esteban; B. Moore; Michael Amoroso; Ronnie Louise Taheny
- Producer(s): Boyd Barber

Sasha singles chronology
"Here She Comes Again" (2001)	"Turn It into Something Special" (2002)	"This Is My Time" (2002)

"Turn It into Something Special" is a song recorded by German recording artist Sasha. It was written by S. Esteban, B. Moore, Ronnie Louise Taheny and Michael Amoroso for his third studio album Surfin' on a Backbeat (2001), while production was helmed by Boyd Barber. Released as the album's second single, while also serving as the theme song for the 2002 German teleplay Die Affäre Semmeling, the ballad reached the top forty of the German Singles Chart.

== Formats and track listings ==
CD single
No.	Title	Length
1.	"Turn It into Something Special" (Radio Cut)	3:32
2.	"Turn It into Something Special"	4:42
3.	"Turn It into Something Special" (Svengali's Remix für Elisa)	4:25
4.	"Why Does Everybody Hurt" (Quartette Version)	3:33
5.	"Turn It into Something Special" (Instrumental Version)	4:41

== Charts ==
=== Weekly charts ===
Chart (2002)	Peak position
Germany (GfK)	35
