= My Lucky Day (Chicago Fire) =

- Chicago Fire episode
- Hermann and Cruz reunite outside the building fire after being rescued from the elevator
- Episode no.: Season 9 Episode 5
- Directed by: Reza Tabrizi
- Written by: Michael Gilvary & Andrea Newman & Derek Haas
- Cinematography by: Lisa Wiegand
- Editing by: Jeff Cenkner
- Production code: 905
- Original air date: February 3, 2021 (Note: This episode was originally scheduled to air on January 20, 2021, in the United States and Canada, but was preempted in the United States for news coverage of the inauguration of Joe Biden.)
- Running time: 42 minutes

Guest appearances
- Baize Buzan as Holly; Brian King as Trevor Kincaid; Randy Flagler as Harold Capp; Anthony Ferraris as Tony Ferraris

Episode chronology
← Previous "Funny What Things Remind Us"	Next → "Blow This Up Somehow"
- Chicago Fire (season 9)

"My Lucky Day" is the fifth episode of the ninth season of Chicago Fire. It is also the one hundredth and eighty-fourth episode overall. The episode was directed by Reza Tabrizi and written by Michael Gilvary & Andrea Newman & Derek Haas. The episode aired on February 3, 2021, on the National Broadcasting Company (NBC) In the episode two characters, Lieutenant Christopher Hermann and Firefighter Joe Cruz, get trapped in a freight elevator during a building fire and are unable to contact anyone for assistance. It was designed as a bottle episode to cut higher production costs during the COVID-19 pandemic. The episode received positive reviews and series stars David Eigenberg and Joe Miñoso were praised by Haas, crew members, and critics for their performance in the episode.

== Plot ==
At the beginning of shift a call comes in for a structure fire. On the way to call Joe Cruz seems spaced out while Christopher Hermann mentions that a fortune cookie he opened the day before said it would be his lucky day. Everyone enters the building including Holly, the building manager, who Hermann escorts inside. Hermann, Holly, a construction contractor named Trevor, and a reluctant Cruz board the elevator alone. On the way up an elevator cable snaps causing it to stop during which Trevor sustains a broken leg. Hermann attempts to radio outside for help to no avail while Cruz aims to calm a panicked Holly. Trevor talks about his son ultimately causing Cruz to reveal that his wife Chloe is pregnant. Cruz finds and opens an elevator escape hatch as another cable snaps. Trevor says that Cruz knows a lot about elevators and Cruz mentions Otis. Cruz, using Otis' knowledge thinks the best option is to open the elevator panel and reset it. More radio static comes through the radio allowing them to hear that Mouch is missing in the fire with his condition unknown. Holly panics again at the smell of smoke and gets electrocuted by the panel attempting to reset it herself.

Hermann and Cruz tend to an injured Holly who has second-degree burns. Cruz finally resets the panel but it ends up being fried and unusable. Hermann and Cruz attempt to lighten the load by getting rid of maintenance equipment causing unneeded weight. Sparks from the panel almost cause a fire in the elevator but Hermann stops it. Cruz attempts to get the escape hatch open again while Holly and Trevor unite to help him. Smoke begins to fill the elevator just as Cruz gets the escape hatch open. The four climb into the elevator shaft and hear that Mouch was rescued while also being able to radio for help themselves. Squad 3 rescue the four from the shaft and everyone reunites outside. Holly and Trevor receive treatment and the two make plans for a date. Hermann tells Cruz that there isn't anyone else he'd rather have been trapped in the elevator with and they agree that Otis' spirit was also in the elevator. Cruz then tells Hermann that he can't tell anyone about Chloe's pregnancy. Hermann reunites with Mouch as he exits the building and everyone begins to head home.

== Production ==
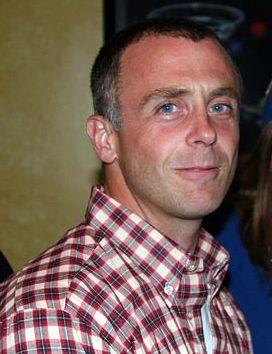
Showrunner Derek Haas praised Eigenberg's performance in the episode calling it "his best of the series."

"My Lucky Day" was written and filmed as a bottle episode utilizing a singular set of a freight elevator for the majority of filming. The idea for the episode came to be after network executives at NBC requested a lower-costing episode after a series of higher-costing episodes caused by the COVID-19 pandemic. Derek Haas, the showrunner for the series, described the episode as being more written like a play as opposed to a regular television episode with actors performing entire acts in one take compared to the ten to twelve scenes that are normally filmed for a single act.

Director Reza Tabriz used nine cameras placed around the set of which six were GoPros; the series usually utilizes two cameras to film. Haas also said that the longest filmed scene of the episode was 28-minutes long which is unusual for the series. The episode primarily featured series stars David Eigenberg and Joe Miñoso as well as guest stars Baize Buzan and Brian King with the remainder of the series regulars of the series only being featured in minor roles. Eigenberg's performance was called "his best of the series" by Haas who also said that Eigenberg and Miñoso both "truly delivered". It was also noted that Eigenberg and Miñoso received cheers and applause from the production crew after filming concluded.

== Reception ==
=== Viewing figures ===
In the United States the episode was viewed live by 7.31 million viewers. Meanwhile, in Canada the episode was watched by 1.3 million viewers and was ranked thirteenth on the list of top viewed programs of the week.

=== Critical response ===
Laura Hurley with Cinema Blend stated that the episode may be "television's most epic bottle episode." Meanwhile, CarterMatt said "This is an emotional gut-punch of an episode, one that looks and feels different than almost any other." Medium's Shain E. Thomas noted the intensity of the drama in the episode despite the majority taking place on the same set. The episode was also noted for its use of remembering characters who died within the series, most notably Yuri Sardarov's Otis.
