= If You Believe (Sasha song) =

Single by Sasha

from the album Dedicated to...
- Released: 26 October 1998
- Genre: Pop
- Length: 3:57
- Label: Warner Music
- Songwriters: Grant Michael B.; Pomez di Lorenzo
- Producers: Pomez di Lorenzo; Grant Michael B.

Sasha singles chronology
"I'm Still Waitin'" (1998)	"If You Believe" (1998)	"We Can Leave the World" (1999)

"If You Believe'" is a song recorded by German singer Sasha. It was written by Grant Michael B., Pomez di Lorenzo and Pete Smith and produced by the former two for Sasha's debut studio album Dedicated to... (1998). His most successful release to date, it reached the top five in Austria, Flanders, Germany, Italy, the Netherlands and Switzerland and reached number 15 of the Swedish Singles Chart.

== Credits and personnel ==
Credits adapted from the liner notes of Dedicated to...

- Music and lyrics – Pomez di Lorenzo, Grant Michael B.
- Lead and backing vocals – Sasha
- Mixing – Falk Moller, Michael B.

== Charts ==
=== Weekly charts ===
Weekly chart performance for "If You Believe"
Chart (1998–1999)	Peak position
Austria (Ö3 Austria Top 40)	2
Belgium (Ultratop 50 Flanders)	2
Belgium (Ultratop 50 Wallonia)	26
Germany (GfK)	3
Italy (FIMI)	4
Italy Airplay (Music & Media)	9
Netherlands (Dutch Top 40)	3
Netherlands (Single Top 100)	2
Sweden (Sverigetopplistan)	15
Switzerland (Schweizer Hitparade)	4

=== Year-end charts ===
Annual chart rankings for "If You Believe"
Chart (1998)	Position
Germany (Official German Charts)	50
Chart (1999)	Position
Austria (Ö3 Austria Top 40)	13
Belgium (Ultratop Flanders)	22
Belgium (Ultratop Wallonia)	84
Europe (Radio Top 50)	75
Europe Border Breakers (Music & Media)	10
Germany (Official German Charts)	35
Italy (Musica e dischi)	12
Netherlands (Dutch Top 40)	6
Netherlands (Single Top 100)	9
Romania (Romanian Top 100)	61
Switzerland (Schweizer Hitparade)	32

=== Decade-end charts ===
Chart (1990–1999)	Rank
Netherlands (Dutch Top 40)	67

== Certifications ==
Certifications and sales for "If You Believe"
Region	Certification	Certified units/sales
Austria (IFPI Austria)	Gold	25,000^{*}
Germany (BVMI)	Platinum	500,000^{^}
Switzerland (IFPI Switzerland)	Gold	25,000^{^}
^{*} Sales figures based on certification alone.^{^} Shipments figures based on certification alone.
