= Chemical Reaction (song) =

2000 single by Sasha

Single by Sasha

from the album ...you
- Released: 26 June 2000
- Genre: Pop; reggae
- Length: 4:25
- Label: WEA
- Songwriters: Grant Michael B.; Pomez di Lorenzo; Sascha Schmitz
- Producers: Pomez di Lorenzo; Grant Michael B.

Sasha singles chronology
"Let Me Be the One" (2000)	"Chemical Reaction" (2000)	"Owner of My Heart" (2000)

"Chemical Reaction" is a song by German singer Sasha. It was written by Sasha, Pete Boyd Smith, Michael Kersting, and Stephan Baader for Sasha's second studio album ...you (2000), while production was overseen by the latter two. Released as the album's second single, it reached number seven in the Flemish portion of Belgium and the top 40 in Austria, Germany and Switzerland.

== Credits and personnel ==
Credits adapted from the liner notes of ...you

- Music and lyrics – Pomez di Lorenzo, Grant Michael B.
- Lead and backing vocals – Sasha
- Mixing – Falk Moller, Michael B.

== Charts ==
=== Weekly charts ===
Weekly chart performance for "Chemical Reaction"
Chart (2000)	Peak position
Austria (Ö3 Austria Top 40)	39
Belgium (Ultratop 50 Flanders)	7
Czech Republic (IFPI)	7
Germany (GfK)	29
Switzerland (Schweizer Hitparade)	32

Annual chart rankings for "Chemical Reaction"
Chart (2000)	Rank
European Airplay (Border Breakers)	72
