= Herz Kraft Werke =

Studio album by Sarah Connor
- Released: 31 May 2019
- Length: 58:28
- Language: German
- Label: Polydor
- Producer: Djorkaeff

Sarah Connor chronology
Muttersprache (2015)	Herz Kraft Werke (2019)	Not So Silent Night (2022)

Singles from Herz Kraft Werke
- 1. "Vincent" Released: 5 April 2019; 2. "Ich wünsch dir" Released: 6 September 2019

Herz Kraft Werke is the tenth studio album by German singer Sarah Connor. It was released on 31 May 2019 by Polydor Records. Connor recorded the album in Nashville and London. Herz Kraft Werke debuted at number one in Austria and Germany. Its lead single "Vincent" was released along with the album announcement on 5 April.

== Background ==
Connor co-wrote lead single "Vincent" with Peter Plate and Ulf Sommer, and also enlisted cellists Rosie Danvers, Nico Rebscher, Simon Triebel and Ali Zuckowski and producer Djorkaeff for the album.

== Critical reception ==
Professional ratings
Review scores
Source	Rating
CDStarts	8/10
laut.de	2/5 stars

Sven Kabelitz from laut.de wrote that: "Aside from a few songs – mostly made up of tame ballads—two teams share the spotlight with Sarah on Herz Kraft Werke. On one side is the old Rosenstolz crew led by Peter Plate and Ulf Leo Sommer; on the other, Konstantin "Djorkaeff" Scherer and Wim Treuner. The clear winners of this duel are the Rosenstolz members, who prove far more adept in the schlager environment with their exuberant piano and string arrangements. As the album is roughly divided into two halves, with Scherer/Treuner taking over the second, there is a noticeable drop in tension. This decline causes the album to end on a weaker note than it initially promised."

== Track listing ==
The deluxe edition of the album features 24 tracks; one disc with 15 tracks, and the second with nine.

Standard edition
No.	Title	Lyrics	Music	Producer(s)	Length
1.	"Vincent"	Sarah Connor; Peter Plate; Ulf Leo Sommer	Connor; Plate; Sommer; Daniel Faust	Connor; Plate; Sommer; Faust; Konstantin "Djorkaeff" Scherer; Benjamin Bistram	4:43
2.	"Ich wünsch dir"	Connor; Tobias Kuhn; Julian Philipp David	Connor; Kuhn; David	Connor; Kuhn; David	3:52
3.	"Ruiniert"	Connor; Plate; Sommer	Connor; Plate; Sommer; Faust	Connor; Plate; Sommer; Daniel Faust	4:41
4.	"Flugzeug aus Papier (Für Emmy)"	Connor; Pille Hillebrand	Connor; Nicolas Rebscher	Connor; Rebscher	4:45
5.	"Hör auf deinen Bauch"	Connor	Connor; Rebscher	Connor; Rebscher	3:54
6.	"Keiner pisst in mein Revier"	Connor; Plate; Sommer	Connor; Plate; Sommer; Faust	Connor; Rebscher	3:33
7.	"Mein Jetzt mein Hier"	Connor; Simon Triebel; Ali Zuckowski	Connor; Triebel; Zuckowski	Connor; Djorkaeff; Bistram; Triebel; Zuckowski	2:55
8.	"Unendlich"	Connor	Connor; Scherer	Connor; Djorkaeff	3:35
9.	"Zelt am Strand"	Connor	Connor; Scherer	Connor; Djorkaeff	3:46
10.	"Unter alten Jacken"	Connor	Connor; Scherer; Tim Wreuner	Connor; Djorkaeff	3:09
11.	"Schloss aus Glas"	Connor; Plate; Sommer	Connor; Plate; Sommer; Faust	Connor; Plate; Sommer; Faust	4:10
12.	"Weisst du noch Herz"	Connor	Connor; Scherer; Wreuner	Connor; Djorkaeff	3:28
13.	"Kleinstadtsymphonie"	Connor; Plate; Sommer	Connor; Plate; Sommer; Faust	Connor; Plate; Sommer; Faust	4:41
14.	"Es war gut"	Connor	Connor; Scherer	Connor; Djorkaeff; Bistram	3:26
15.	"Dank dir"	Connor; Triebel; Zuckowski	Connor; Triebel; Zuckowski	Connor; Djorkaeff; Bistram	3:50
Total length:					58:28

Deluxe edition – bonus disc
No.	Title	Lyrics	Music	Producer(s)	Length
1.	"Töten dafür"	Connor; Gregor Meyle	Connor	Connor	3:30
2.	"Drachen"	Connor; Hillebrand	Connor; Scherer	Connor; Djorkaeff; Bistram	3:39
3.	"Es war gut" (Fan-Version)	Connor	Connor; Scherer	Connor; Djorkaeff; Bistram	4:35
4.	"Vincent" (akustisch)	Connor; Plate; Sommer	Connor; Plate; Sommer; Faust	Connor; Plate; Sommer; Faust; Djorkaeff; Bistram	4:45
5.	"Ich wünsch dir" (akustisch)	Connor; Kuhn; David	Connor; Kuhn; David	Connor; Kuhn; David	3:49
6.	"Zelt am Strand" (akustisch)	Connor	Connor; Scherer	Connor; Djorkaeff; Bistram	5:17
7.	"Mein Jetzt mein Hier" (akustisch)	Connor; Triebel; Zuckowski	Connor; Triebel; Zuckowski	Connor; Djorkaeff; Bistram; Triebel; Zuckowski	3:00
8.	"Kleinstadtsymphonie" (akustisch)	Connor; Plate; Sommer	Connor; Plate; Sommer; Faust	Connor; Plate; Sommer; Faust	4:18
9.	"Hör auf deinen Bauch" (akustisch)	Connor	Connor; Rebscher	Connor; Rebscher	4:00
Total length:					36:53

Special deluxe edition – bonus disc
No.	Title	Lyrics	Music	Producer(s)	Length
1.	"Bye Bye"	Connor	Connor; Kuhn	Connor; Kuhn	3:16
2.	"Stark"	Connor	Connor; Kuhn	Connor; Kuhn	3:34
3.	"Blau"	Connor	Connor; Kuhn	Connor; Kuhn	3:24
4.	"Alles in mir will zu dir"	Connor	Connor; Rebscher	Connor; Rebscher	3:26
5.	"Freibadpommes"	Connor	Connor; Rebscher	Connor; Rebscher	2:32
6.	"Dazwischen sind wir Freunde"	Connor	Connor; Scherer; Bistram; Vincent "Beatzarre" Stein	Connor; David Bonk; Beatzarre; Sommer; Djorkaeff; Bistram	3:06
7.	"Töten dafür"	Connor; Meyle	Connor	Connor	3:30
8.	"Drachen"	Connor; Hillebrand	Connor; Scherer	Connor; Djorkaeff; Bistram	3:39
9.	"Es war gut" (Fan-Version)	Connor	Connor; Scherer	Connor; Djorkaeff; Bistram	4:35
10.	"Vincent" (akustisch)	Connor; Plate; Sommer	Connor; Plate; Sommer; Faust	Connor; Plate; Sommer; Faust; Djorkaeff; Bistram	4:45
11.	"Ich wünsch dir" (akustisch)	Connor; Kuhn; David	Connor; Kuhn; David	Connor; Kuhn; David	3:49
12.	"Zelt am Strand" (akustisch)	Connor	Connor; Scherer	Connor; Djorkaeff; Bistram	5:17
13.	"Mein Jetzt mein Hier" (akustisch)	Connor; Triebel; Zuckowski	Connor; Triebel; Zuckowski	Connor; Djorkaeff; Bistram; Triebel; Zuckowski	3:00
14.	"Kleinstadtsymphonie" (akustisch)	Connor; Plate; Sommer	Connor; Plate; Sommer; Faust	Connor; Plate; Sommer; Faust	4:18
15.	"Hör auf deinen Bauch" (akustisch)	Connor	Connor; Rebscher	Connor; Rebscher	4:00
Total length:					36:53

== Charts ==
=== Weekly charts ===
Weekly chart performance for Herz Kraft Werke
Chart (2019)	Peak position
Austrian Albums (Ö3 Austria)	1
German Albums (Offizielle Top 100)	1
Swiss Albums (Schweizer Hitparade)	3

=== Year-end charts ===
2019 year-end chart performance for Herz Kraft Werke
Chart (2019)	Position
Austrian Albums (Ö3 Austria)	2
German Albums (Offizielle Top 100)	2
Swiss Albums (Schweizer Hitparade)	36

2020 year-end chart performance for Herz Kraft Werke
Chart (2020)	Position
German Albums (Offizielle Top 100)	3

2021 year-end chart performance for Herz Kraft Werke
Chart (2021)	Position
German Albums (Offizielle Top 100)	39

== Certifications ==
Certifications for Herz Kraft Werke
Region	Certification	Certified units/sales
Austria (IFPI Austria)	2× Platinum	30,000^{‡}
Germany (BVMI)	2× Platinum	400,000^{‡}
^{‡} Sales+streaming figures based on certification alone.

== Release history ==
Herz Kraft Werke release history
Region	Date	Format	Label	Ref(s)
Various	31 May 2019	CD; Digital download; Streaming; Vinyl	Polydor	
Various	21 May 2021	CD; Digital download; Streaming; Vinyl	Polydor	
