= The One (Sasha album) =

Studio album by Sasha
- Released: 5 December 2014
- Length: 40:40
- Label: Columbia
- Producer: Robin Grubert; Peter Seifert; Stefan Skarbek

Sasha chronology
Good News on a Bad Day (2009)	The One (2014)	Schlüsselkind (2018)

The One is the sixth regular studio album by German pop singer Sasha, released by Columbia Records on 5 December 2014 in German-speaking Europe. It marked his first studio album in five years, following the release of 2009's Good News on a Bad Day and Rock'n'Roll Therapy (2011), his second album with Dick Brave & The Backbeats.

== Critical reception ==
Professional ratings
Review scores
Source	Rating
laut.de	2/5 stars

Kai Butterweck from laut.de rated the album two out of five stars. He felt that the "album, at least in its danceable moments, hits the coolness level of a chill pad basking in the sun [...] Sasha’s voice still melts hearts in candlelight mode. But once the instrumentals pick up speed, it fades into something pale and monotonous. And yet, the path to a better, more authentic future was paved long ago – thanks to Dick Brave. In her review for T-Online, Julia Brummert noted that downtempo tracks "are still Sasha’s thing, but the affected coolness doesn't suit the singer very well." She was critical with Sasha's decision to experiment with "spoken word, funk, reggae, and scratch elements" on the album. Hitchecker magazine found that "on his new album, Sasha sounds like he did 15 years ago [...] which makes him feel like yesterday’s news [...] The flaw in this concept is easy to spot: a pop album that sounds like it was produced in 1998 feels terribly outdated and stale in 2014."

== Commercial performance ==
In Germany, The One debuted and peaked at number 18 on the German Albums Chart in the week of 19 December 2014. It was a considerable decline from Sasha's previous efforts, all of which had at least reached the top 10 on the chart. In Switzerland, the album reached number 59 on the Swiss Albums Chart. It marked the singer's first album to miss the top 40. The One failed to chart elsewhere, becoming Sasha's first album not to chart in Austria.

== Track listing ==
The One track listing
No.	Title	Writer(s)	Producer(s)	Length
1.	"Enjoy the Ride"	Sasha; Ben Cullum; Julie Thompson	Peter "Jem" Seifert	3:24
2.	"Good Days"	Sasha; Robin Grubert; Stefan Skarbek	Grubert; Skarbek	3:03
3.	"Mad Love"	Sasha; Rob Kleiner; Whitney Phillips	Grubert; Skarbek	2:59
4.	"Rock Within the Breakers"	Sasha; Skarbek	Grubert; Skarbek	3:00
5.	"Sleeping with the Lights On"	Sasha; Grubert; Ali Zuckowski	Grubert; Skarbek	3:59
6.	"Me and My Gorilla"	Sasha; Justin Balk; Zuckowski; Oliver Rüger	Grubert; Skarbek	2:49
7.	"Can't Quit Loving You"	Sasha; Zuckowski; Martin Fliegenschmidt	Seifert	3:58
8.	"A Girl Like You"	Sasha; Zuckowski; Simon Triebel	Seifert	3:20
9.	"Working for Love"	Sasha; Grubert; Jon Ingoldsby	Grubert; Skarbek	4:11
10.	"Skyline"	Sasha; Balk; Zuckowski	Seifert	3:44
11.	"Silver Linings" (featuring Lynne)	Sasha; Grubert; Zuckowski; Seidensticker	Grubert	3:29
12.	"The One"	Sasha; Grubert; Skarbek	Grubert; Skarbek	2:45
Total length:				40:40

== Charts ==
Weekly chart performance for The One
Chart (2014)	Peak position
German Albums (Offizielle Top 100)	18
Swiss Albums (Schweizer Hitparade)	59
