= Here She Comes Again =

Single by Sasha

from the album Surfin' on a Backbeat
- Released: 12 October 2001
- Genre: Pop; pop rock
- Length: 3:55
- Label: WEA
- Songwriter(s): Sascha Schmitz; S. Esteban; B. Moore; Michael Amoroso
- Producer(s): Boyd Barber

Sasha singles chronology
"Owner of My Heart" (2000)	"Here She Comes Again" (2001)	"Turn It into Something Special" (2002)

"Here She Comes Again" is a song recorded by German recording artist Sasha. It was written by S. Esteban, B. Moore, Michael Amoroso, and Sasha for his third studio album Surfin' on a Backbeat (2001). The production was helmed by Boyd Barber and Grant Michael B. It was released as the album's lead single and reached the top thirty of the German Singles Chart.

== Formats and track listings ==
CD single
No.	Title	Length
1.	"Here She Comes Again" (Album Version)	3:55
2.	"Here She Comes Again" (Radio Version)	3:25
3.	"Here She Comes Again" (Extended Version)	5:20
4.	"Here She Comes Again" (Instrumental Version)	3:53

== Charts ==
=== Weekly charts ===
Chart (2001)	Peak position
Austria (Ö3 Austria Top 40)	43
Germany (GfK)	26
Switzerland (Schweizer Hitparade)	42
