= Let Me Be the One (Sasha song) =

2000 single by Sasha

Single by Sasha

from the album ...you
- Released: 20 March 2000
- Genre: Pop
- Length: 4:15
- Label: WEA
- Songwriter(s): Grant Michael B.; Pomez di Lorenzo; Pete Boyd Smith; Sascha Schmitz
- Producer(s): Pomez di Lorenzo; Grant Michael B.

Sasha singles chronology
"I Feel Lonely" (1999)	"Let Me Be the One" (2000)	"Chemical Reaction" (2000)

"Let Me Be the One" is a song by German singer Sasha. It was written by Sasha, Pete Boyd Smith, Michael Kersting, and Stephan Baader for Sasha's second studio album ...you (2000), while production was overseen by the latter two under their production moniker Grant Michael B. and Pomez di Lorenzo. Released as the album's lead single, it reached the top in the Flemish portion of Belgium and the top 20 in Germany and Switzerland.

== Track listing ==
CD maxi single
No.	Title	Length
1.	"Let Me Be the One" (Radio Version)	3:36
2.	"Let Me Be the One" (Album Version)	4:14
3.	"Let Me Be the One" (Extended Version)	5:34
4.	"Let Me Be the One" (Instrumental Version)	3:36

== Credits and personnel ==
Credits adapted from the liner notes of ...you.

- Music and lyrics – Pomez di Lorenzo, Grant Michael B.
- Lead and backing vocals – Sasha
- Guitar – Raymond Blake Jr.
- Mixing – Falk Moller, Michael B.

== Charts ==
=== Weekly charts ===
Chart (2000)	Peak position
Austria (Ö3 Austria Top 40)	24
Belgium (Ultratop 50 Flanders)	7
Czech Republic (IFPI)	2
Germany (GfK)	13
Netherlands (Dutch Top 40)	90
Switzerland (Schweizer Hitparade)	16
