= Good News on a Bad Day =

Studio album by Sasha
- Released: 27 February 2009
- Recorded: 2008
- Genre: Pop, R&B
- Length: 47:37
- Label: Warner Music
- Producer: Edo Zanki

Sasha chronology
Greatest Hits (2006)	Good News on a Bad Day (2009)	The One (2014)

Singles from Good News on a Bad Day
- 1. "Please Please Please" Released: 2009; 2. "There She Goes" Released: 2009

Professional ratings
Review scores
Source	Rating
CDStarts	6.5/10 stars
laut.de	2/5 stars

Good News on a Bad Day is the fifth regular studio album by German pop singer Sasha, released by Warner Music on 27 February 2009 in German-speaking Europe.

Featuring main production by Edo Zanki, the album became Sasha's highest-charting album since 2000's ...you, reaching number three on the German Albums Chart and the top twenty in Austria. It produced two singles, "Please Please Please" and "There She Goes".

The song "Wide Awake" features in the 2009 German film Lila, Lila, starring Daniel Brühl and Hannah Herzsprung.

== Track listing ==
1. "Please Please Please" — 3:34
2. "There She Goes" — 3:13
3. "Good News on a Bad Day" — 2:37
4. "Growing Egos" — 3:53
5. "Why Did You Call" — 2:55
6. "15 Minutes Older" — 3:34
7. "Lipstick on the Mirror" — 5:09
8. "High & Low" — 3:35
9. "Read My Mind" — 4:27
10. "Everybody's Fool" — 3:21
11. "Life Designer" — 3:39
12. "Wide Awake" — 4:05

== Charts ==
=== Weekly charts ===
Chart (2009)	Peak position
Austrian Albums (Ö3 Austria)	18
German Albums (Offizielle Top 100)	3
Swiss Albums (Schweizer Hitparade)	33
