= Owner of My Heart =

2000 single by Sasha

Single by Sasha

from the album ...you
- Released: 13 November 2000
- Genre: Pop
- Length: 4:15
- Label: WEA
- Songwriter(s): Grant Michael B.; Pomez di Lorenzo; Pete Boyd Smith; Sascha Schmitz
- Producer(s): Pomez di Lorenzo; Grant Michael B.

Sasha singles chronology
"Chemical Reaction" (2000)	"Owner of My Heart" (2000)	"Here She Comes Again" (2000)

"Owner of My Heart" is a song by German singer Sasha. It was written by Sasha, Pete Boyd Smith, Michael Kersting, and Stephan Baader for Sasha's second studio album ...you (2000), while production was overseen by the latter two under their production moniker Grant Michael B. and Pomez di Lorenzo. Released as the album's third and final single, it became a moderate commercial success, reached the top 40 in Germany.

== Formats and track listings ==
CD maxi single
No.	Title	Length
1.	"Owner of My Heart" (Boogieman Radio Mix)	3:42
2.	"Owner of My Heart" (Boogieman's Video Mix)	3:42
3.	"Owner of My Heart" (Album Version)	3:40
4.	"Owner of My Heart" (Cuban Latin Mix)	3:47
5.	"Owner of My Heart" (Instrumental Original)	3:41

== Credits and personnel ==
Credits adapted from the liner notes of ...you.

- Music and lyrics – Pomez di Lorenzo, Grant Michael B.
- Lead and backing vocals – Sasha
- Mixing – Falk Moller, Michael B.

== Charts ==
Chart (2000)	Peak position
Austria (Ö3 Austria Top 40)	54
Germany (GfK)	31
Switzerland (Schweizer Hitparade)	61
Poland (Polish Airplay Chart)	5
