= Lucky Day (Sasha song) =

Single by Sasha

from the album Greatest Hits
- Released: 9 March 2007
- Genre: Pop
- Length: 3:16
- Label: Warner
- Songwriters: Robin Grubert; Sascha Schmitz; Alexander Zuckowski
- Producers: Robin Grubert; Sascha Schmitz; Alexander Zuckowski

Sasha singles chronology
"Coming Home" (2006)	"Lucky Day" (2007)	"Hide & Seek" (2007)

"Lucky Day" is a song by German singer Sasha. It was written and produced by Sasha along with Robin Grubert and Alexander Zuckowski for Sasha's first compilation album, "Greatest Hits"(2006). Released as the album's second single, it reached the top 20 of the Austrian Singles Chart and the German Singles Chart.

== Track listing ==
CD maxi single
No.	Title	Length
1.	"Lucky Day" (Album Version)	3:16
2.	"Lucky Day" (New Radio Version)	3:17
3.	"Lucky Day" (Instrumental)	3:16
4.	"Miracle Mile" (Live)	3:24

== Charts ==
=== Weekly charts ===
Chart (2007)	Peak position
Austria (Ö3 Austria Top 40)	18
Germany (GfK)	12

=== Year-end charts ===
Chart (2007)	Position
Germany (Official German Charts)	66
