= Dedicated to... =

Dedicated to…

Studio album by Sasha
- Released: 26 October 1998
- Recorded: 1998
- Genres: Pop; rock
- Labels: Warner Music; Reprise
- Producers: Grant Michael B.; Pomez di Lorenzo; Pete Smith

Sasha chronology
Dedicated to… (1998)	...you (2000)

Singles from Dedicated to...
- 1. "I'm Still Waitin'" Released: 1998; 2. "If You Believe" Released: 1998; 3. "We Can Leave the World" Released: 1999; 4. "I Feel Lonely" Released: 1999

Professional ratings
Review scores
Source	Rating
AllMusic	3/5 stars
PopMatters	(mixed)
Die Welt	(mixed)

Dedicated to… is the debut studio album by German pop singer Sasha, released by Warner Music on 26 October 1998 in German-speaking Europe. A compiled edition, also including songs of follow-up album ...you (2000), was released under the same name on 27 March 2001 in Canada and the United States.

A "blend of romantic ballads and quicker funk- and reggae-inspired tracks," according to Billboard, the album was initially released in fall 1998 and became a major success around Europe, selling more than 400,000 copies in Germany alone. It reached the top ten of the albums charts in Austria, Germany, Norway, and Switzerland, and was certified platinum and quintuple gold around Europe.

The album produced four singles, including "If You Believe," which would become his highest-charting single to date and reached the top five in Austria, Belgium, Germany, the Netherlands and Switzerland, receiving one platinum and four gold discs. With lead single "I'm Still Waitin'", "We Can Leave the World" and "I Feel Lonely" the album spawned two further top ten hits.

== Track listing ==
Dedicated to... – Standard edition
No.	Title	Writer(s)	Producer(s)	Length
1.	"If You Believe"	Pete Smith; Michael B.; Lorenzo	Grant Michael B.; Pomez di Lorenzo	4:29
2.	"Don't Say Good-bye"	Michael B.; Lorenzo	Michael B.; Lorenzo	4:12
3.	"I Feel Lonely"	Michael B.; Lorenzo; Sascha Schmitz	Michael B.; Lorenzo	3:58
4.	"I'm Still Waitin'(Unreleased Album Version)"	Michael B.; Lorenzo; Schmitz	Michael B.; Lorenzo	4:02
5.	"Keep on Runnin'"	Smith; Michael B.; Lorenzo	Michael B.; Lorenzo	4:17
6.	"Easy"	Lionel Richie	Michael B.; Lorenzo	4:06
7.	"Get Down (I Wanna Get Up)"	Michael B.; Lorenzo; Schmitz	Michael B.; Lorenzo	4:18
8.	"Lost in Your Blue Eyes"	Michael B.; Lorenzo	Michael B.; Lorenzo	4:55
9.	"Let Me Have You Girl"	Smith; Michael B.; Lorenzo	Michael B.; Lorenzo	4:10
10.	"Right on Time"	Smith; Michael B.; Lorenzo	Michael B.; Lorenzo	4:02
11.	"Raindrops"	Michael B.; Lorenzo	Michael B.; Lorenzo	3:30
12.	"We Can Leave the World"	Smith; Michael B.; Lorenzo	Michael B.; Lorenzo	5:31

Dedicated to... – Tour edition
No.	Title	Writer(s)	Producer(s)	Length
13.	"We Can Leave the World" (Mokran Mix)	Smith; Michael B.; Lorenzo	Michael B.; Lorenzo; Peter Mokran^{[A]}	5:15
14.	"If You Believe" (Lenny B Radio Edit)	Smith; Michael B.; Lorenzo	Michael B.; Lorenzo; Lenny Bertoldo^{[A]}	4:09
15.	"If You Believe" (The Groove Brothers Remix)	Smith; Michael B.; Lorenzo	Michael B.; Lorenzo; The Groove Brothers^{[A]}	4:23
16.	"If You Believe" (Mokran Mix)	Smith; Michael B.; Lorenzo	Michael B.; Lorenzo; Mokran^{[A]}	4:07
17.	"Another Minute"		David Kahne	4:50

Notes

- ^{^[A]} denotes additional producer

== Charts ==
=== Weekly charts ===
Chart (1998–1999)	Peak position
Austrian Albums (Ö3 Austria)	2
Belgian Albums (Ultratop Flanders)	32
Dutch Albums (Album Top 100)	23
Finnish Albums (Suomen virallinen lista)	19
German Albums (Offizielle Top 100)	4
Norwegian Albums (VG-lista)	8
Portuguese Albums (AFP)	10
Swiss Albums (Schweizer Hitparade)	10

=== Year-end charts ===
Chart (1999)	Rank
Austrian Albums (Ö3 Austria)	10
German Albums (Official Top 100)	10
Swiss Albums (Schweizer Hitparade)	22

== Certifications ==
Region	Certification	Certified units/sales
Austria (IFPI Austria)	Gold	25,000^{*}
Germany (BVMI)	Platinum	500,000^{^}
Switzerland (IFPI Switzerland)	Gold	25,000^{^}
^{*} Sales figures based on certification alone.^{^} Shipments figures based on certification alone.
