= Surfin' on a Backbeat =

Studio album by Sasha
- Released: 29 October 2001
- Recorded: 2001
- Genres: Pop, rock
- Length: 47:37
- Label: Warner Music
- Producers: Grant Michael B., Barber, Boyd, Pomez di Lorenzo, Pete Smith

Sasha chronology
...you (2000)	Surfin' on a Backbeat (2001)	Dick This! (2003)

Singles from Surfin' on a Backbeat
- 1. "Here She Comes Again" Released: 2001; 2. "Turn It into Something Special" Released: 2002; 3. "This Is My Time" Released: 2002; 4. "Rooftop" Released: 2002

Professional ratings
Review scores
Source	Rating
laut.de	(in German)

Surfin' on a Backbeat is the third studio album by German pop singer Sasha, released by Warner Music on 29 October 2001 in German-speaking Europe.

Taking Sasha's work further into pop rock, Surfin' on a Backbeat reached the top ten of the albums charts in Germany, but charted significantly lower than its predecessors. It was however, certified gold by the German leg of the IFPI for more than 200,000 sold copies. The album and its re-release produced four singles, including leading single "Here She Comes Again" and "This Is My Time", the 2002 FIFA World Cup television hymn. A reissue of the album was released on 22 July 2002, containing two previously unreleased tracks.

== Track listing ==
1. "Rooftop" – 4:09
2. "Blown Away" – 3:21
3. "Turn It into Something Special" – 4:41
4. "One Look in Your Eyes" – 4:13
5. "Here She Comes Again" – 3:55
6. "Everybody Loves You" – 4:31
7. "On and On" – 4:02
8. "Let's Get Closer" – 3:17
9. "Just a Second Away" – 4:14
10. "Drive My Car" – 3:45
11. "Days Like These" – 3:54
12. "Why Does Everybody Hurt" – 3:35

=== 2002 reissue ===
1. "This Is My Time" – 3:37
2. "Rooftop" – 4:09
3. "Blown Away" – 3:21
4. "Turn It into Something Special" – 4:41
5. "One Look in Your Eyes" – 4:13
6. "Here She Comes Again" – 3:55
7. "Everybody Loves You" – 4:31
8. "On and On" – 4:02
9. "Let's Get Closer" – 3:17
10. "Just a Second Away" – 4:14
11. "Drive My Car" – 3:45
12. "Days Like These" – 3:54
13. "Why Does Everybody Hurt" – 3:35
14. "Through the Barricades" – 6:16

== Charts ==
=== Weekly charts ===
Chart (2001)	Peak position
Austrian Albums (Ö3 Austria)	63
German Albums (Offizielle Top 100)	7
Swiss Albums (Schweizer Hitparade)	32

== Certifications ==
Region	Certification	Certified units/sales
Germany (BVMI)	Gold	150,000^{^}
^{^} Shipments figures based on certification alone.
