= We Can Leave the World =

Single by Sasha

from the album Dedicated to...
- Released: 8 March 1999
- Genre: Pop
- Length: 5:31
- Label: Warner Music Group
- Songwriters: Grant Michael B.; Pomez di Lorenzo; Sascha Schmitz
- Producers: Pomez di Lorenzo; Grant Michael B.

Sasha singles chronology
"If You Believe" (1998)	"We Can Leave the World" (1999)	"I Feel Lonely" (1999)

"We Can Leave the World" is a song recorded by German singer Sasha. It was written by Pete Smith, Michael "Grant Michael B." Kersting, and Stephan "Pomez di Lorenzo" Baader for Sasha's debut studio album Dedicated to... (1998), while production was overseen by the latter two. Released as the album's third single, the song became a top ten success in Austria, Germany, and Switzerland.

== Credits and personnel ==
Credits adapted from the liner notes of Dedicated to...

- Music and lyrics – Pomez di Lorenzo, Grant Michael B.
- Lead and backing vocals – Sasha
- Mixing – Falk Moller, Michael B.

== Charts ==
=== Weekly charts ===
Weekly chart performance for "We Can Leave the World"
Chart (1999)	Peak position
Austria (Ö3 Austria Top 40)	8
Belgium (Ultratop 50 Flanders)	23
Germany (GfK)	10
Netherlands (Single Top 100)	72
Switzerland (Schweizer Hitparade)	8

=== Year-end charts ===
Annual chart rankings for "We Can Leave the World"
Chart (1999)	Rank
Europe Border Breakers (Music & Media)	42
Germany (Official German Charts)	63
Romania (Romanian Top 100)	75
