= Young Deenay =

German rapper

Fatima Napo
- Born: 14 January 1979 (age 47); Bandiagara, Mali
- Genre: Hip hop
- Occupation: Musician
- Years active: 1997–99
- Labels: WEA Records, Warner Music Germany

Fatima Napo (born 14 January 1979), better known by her stage name Young Deenay, is a former German rapper.

== History ==
Fatima Napo studied Psychology at Goethe University in Frankfurt, Germany. At the age of 18, Napo signed with now defunct record label WEA Records. Napo's first single "Walk On By" (1997) stayed in the German charts for 14 weeks. Her second single "Wannabe Your Lover" (1998) introduced Sasha and paved the way for his career. In his first hit "I'm Still Waitin'" (1998), Young Deenay only has a supporting feature.
