= ...you =

Studio album by Sasha
- Released: 2 May 2000
- Recorded: 2000
- Genre: Pop; rock; reggae
- Label: Warner
- Producer: Grant Michael B.; Pomez di Lorenzo; Pete Smith

Sasha chronology
Dedicated to... (1998)	...you (2000)	Surfin' on a Backbeat (2001)

Singles from ...you
- 1. "Let Me Be the One" Released: 2000; 2. "Chemical Reaction" Released: 2000; 3. "Owner of My Heart" Released: 2000

...you is the second studio album by German pop singer Sasha, released by Warner Music on 2 May 2000 in German-speaking Europe, chiefly produced by Grant Michael B. and Pomez di Lorenzo.

Following the Europe-wide breakthrough success of his debut album Dedicated to..., ...you charted noticeably lower in most international territories. It however manifested Sasha's success throughout German-speaking Europe where it reached higher peak positions than its predecessor on the album charts in Austria, Germany and Switzerland, and was eventually certified double gold by the IFPI. Altogether the album produced three singles, of which only lead single "Let Me Be the One" reached the top 20.

== Track listing ==
No.	Title	Length
1.	"Let Me Be the One"	4:15
2.	"Love Is All Around"	5:01
3.	"Take Good Care"	3:51
4.	"Something Stupid" (featuring Shemsi)	4:19
5.	"Chemical Reaction"	4:25
6.	"Club c'est la vie"	3:53
7.	"Pretty Thing"	4:07
8.	"Take My Hands"	3:30
9.	"Don't You Forget Me"	4:07
10.	"Owner of My Heart"	3:40
11.	"It Ain't That Bad"	3:54
12.	"Reach Inside"	4:41

== Charts ==
=== Weekly charts ===
Chart (2000)	Peak position
Austrian Albums (Ö3 Austria)	5
German Albums (Offizielle Top 100)	2
Swiss Albums (Schweizer Hitparade)	4

=== Year-end charts ===
Chart (2000)	Rank
German Albums (Official Top 100)	46
Swiss Albums (Schweizer Hitparade)	88

== Certifications ==
Region	Certification	Certified units/sales
Germany (BVMI)	Gold	150,000^{^}
^{^} Shipments figures based on certification alone.
