= I Feel Lonely =

Single by Sasha

from the album Dedicated to...
- Released: 21 June 1999
- Genre: Pop; reggae
- Length: 3:58
- Label: Warner Music Group
- Songwriters: Grant Michael B.; Pomez di Lorenzo; Sascha Schmitz
- Producers: Pomez di Lorenzo; Grant Michael B.

Sasha singles chronology
"We Can Leave the World" (1999)	"I Feel Lonely" (1999)	"Let Me Be the One" (2000)

"I Feel Lonely" is a song recorded by German singer Sasha. It was written by Sasha, Michael "Grant Michael B." Kersting, and Stephan "Pomez di Lorenzo" Baader for Sasha's debut studio album Dedicated to... (1998), while production was overseen by the latter two. Released as the album's fourth and final single, the reggae-influenced mid-tempo track became a top ten success in Belgium, Finland, Germany, India, and Switzerland.

In 2014, a jazzy cover version of the song, recorded by Sarah Connor, reached number 44 on the Austrian Singles Chart after her performance on the reality television series Sing meinen Song – Das Tauschkonzert, the German version of The Best Singers series, in which she appeared with Sasha.

== Credits and personnel ==
Credits adapted from the liner notes of Dedicated to...

- Music and lyrics – Pomez di Lorenzo, Grant Michael B.
- Lead and backing vocals – Sasha
- Mixing – Falk Moller, Michael B.

== Charts ==
=== Weekly charts ===
Weekly chart performance for "I Feel Lonely"
Chart (1999)	Peak position
Austria (Ö3 Austria Top 40)	14
Belgium (Ultratip Bubbling Under Flanders)	9
Czech Republic (IFPI)	3
Finland (Suomen virallinen lista)	2
Germany (GfK)	9
Italy (FIMI)	25
Netherlands (Dutch Top 40)	27
Netherlands (Single Top 100)	29
Switzerland (Schweizer Hitparade)	8

=== Year-end charts ===
Year-end chart performance for "I Feel Lonely"
Chart (1999)	Position
Europe Border Breakers (Music & Media)	30
Germany (Media Control)	68
Netherlands (Dutch Top 40)	142
Romania (Romanian Top 100)	44

== Certifications ==
Certifications and sales for "I Feel Lonely"
Region	Certification	Certified units/sales
Germany (BVMI)	Gold	250,000^{^}
^{^} Shipments figures based on certification alone.
