= Sasha (German singer) =

German singer (born 1972)

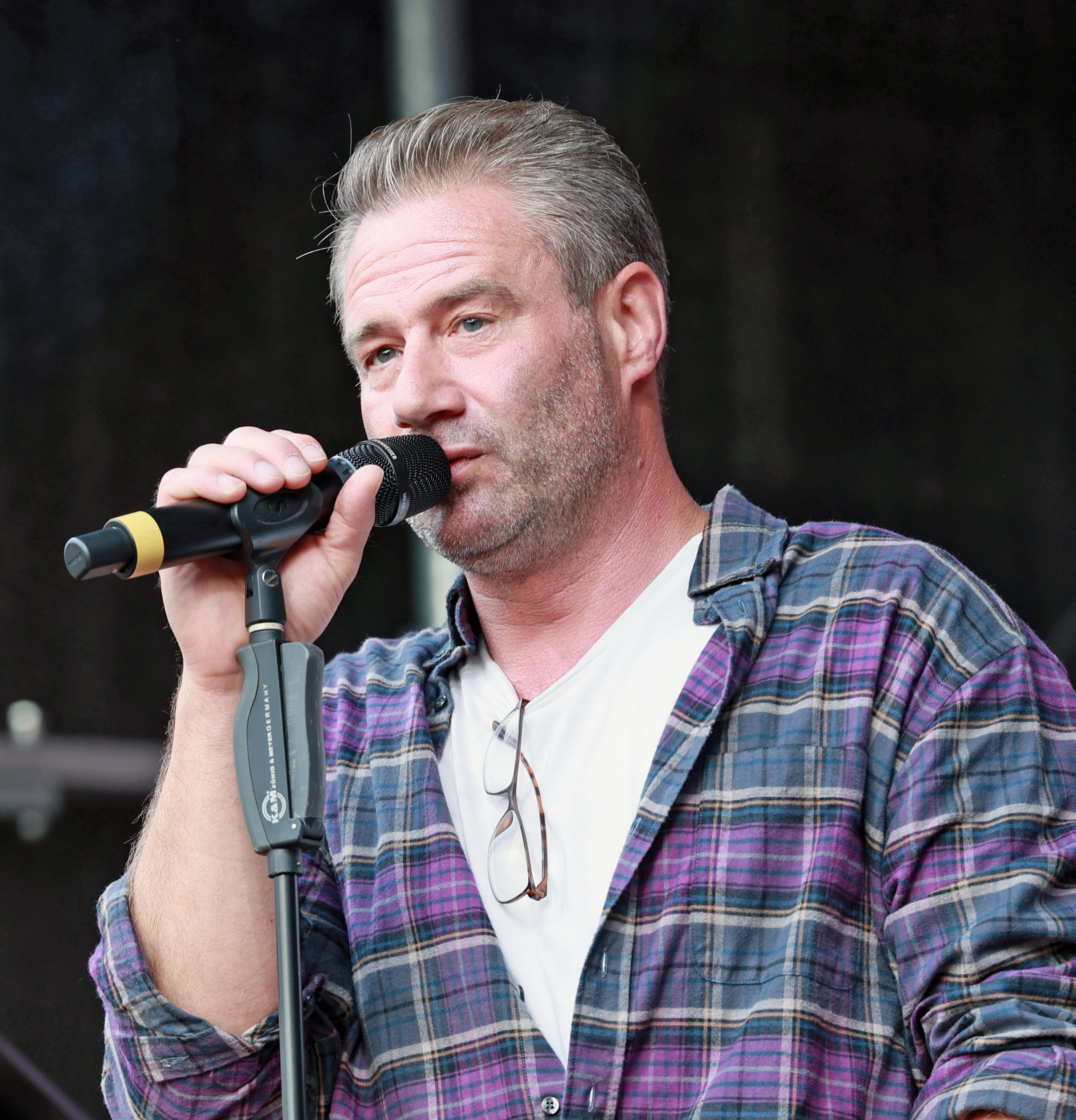
- Sasha in 2023

Background information
- Also known as: Dick Brave; Sasha Alexander; Sasha Röntgen-Schmitz
- Born: Sascha Schmitz; 5 January 1972 (age 54); Soest, West Germany
- Genres: Pop, rock
- Occupations: Singer, songwriter
- Years active: 1998–present
- Label: Warner Music
- Website: sasha.de

Sascha Röntgen-Schmitz (né Schmitz; born 5 January 1972), better known by his stage name Sasha, is a German singer and songwriter. He is also known by his alter ego Dick Brave, as part of the group Dick Brave & the Backbeats. Due to a legal dispute with the Welsh DJ also named Sasha, he is known as Sasha Alexander in the United States.

== Early life ==
Sasha is the elder of two children born to Fritz Schmitz, a former Bundeswehr soldier, and his wife Ramona, a nursery nurse. Raised in a Christian home alongside his younger brother Norman (born 1976), Sasha spent his childhood in Soest, North Rhine-Westphalia, following his parents' divorce.

His early musical interest grew when he started his first school band, called Bad to the Bone, which "was exactly as bad as the name suggests", he later stated. Sasha's first professional band was called Junk Food and modelled on bands such as Nirvana and the Red Hot Chili Peppers. Although the band was never offered a recording contract, they played live all over their area, resulting in occasional busking sessions with his friend Benedict, with whom he also performed as the 'Hin und Hair Schmitz' duo. In 1992, Junk Food won a local talent contest which entitled them to record demo tapes at the Click Music Studios in Werl with producers Michael "Grant Michael F." Kersting and Stephan "Pomez Di Lorenzo" Baader. While the band broke up shortly thereafter, Grant and Di Lorenzo recognized his singing talents and hired Sasha as a backing vocalist for several of their projects.

== Recording career ==
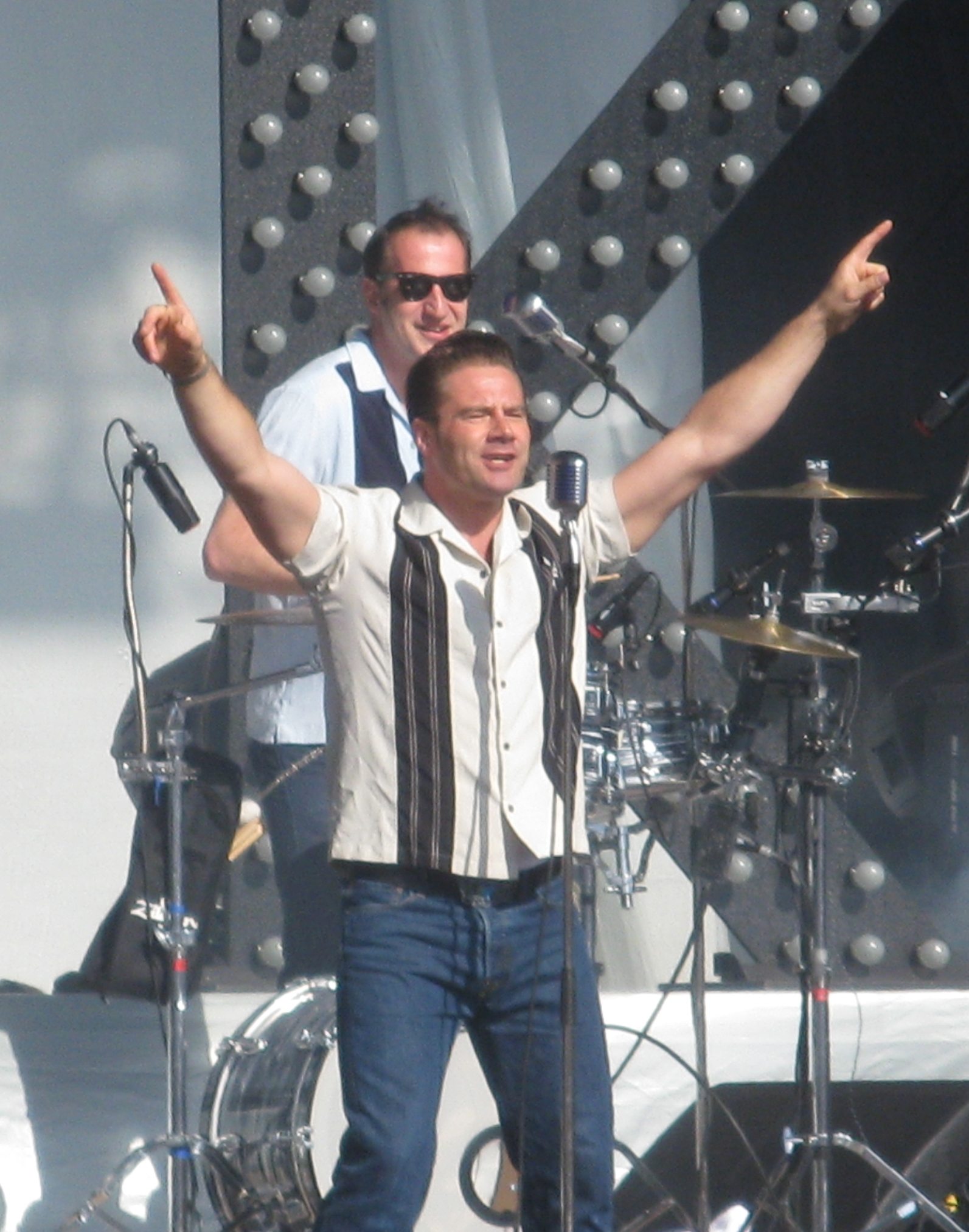
Sasha (foreground) performing as Dick Brave in 2012

=== 1996–2002 ===
During the following years, Sasha earned his money as a background singer for several artists, including virtual euro-dance projects H.I.M and Sir Prize, whose singles "Lookin' Out 4 Luv" and "Don't Go Away" were released in German-speaking Europe, but led to short promotional tours in Tunisia. His contribution to German rapper Der Wolf's debut single "Gibt's doch gar nicht" however, scored him his first uncredited appearance on the German and Swiss Singles Charts in early 1997. Soon thereafter, Sasha was consulted to sing on "Walk on By", the début single of rapper Young Deenay. The song became a top ten hit in Central Europe and resulted in a second collaboration, entitled "Wanna Be Your Lover", on which he received his first credited solo part and filmed a music video for.

In 1998, Sasha signed a solo contract with Warner Music. He worked with Grant, Di Lorenzo and Pete Smith on the majority of his début album Dedicated to..., whose reggae-influenced début single "I'm Still Waitin'" saw him re-teaming with Deenay and reached the top twenty of the charts in summer 1998. The track was followed by "If You Believe", which would become his highest-charting single to date and reached the top five in Austria, Belgium, Germany, the Netherlands, and Switzerland, receiving one platinum and four gold discs. A "blend of romantic ballads and quicker funk- and reggae-inspired tracks", according to Billboard, the album was eventually released in fall 1998 and sold more than 400,000 copies in Germany alone. With "We Can Leave the World" and "I Feel Lonely" the album spawned two further top ten hits, which Sasha performed on a tour between September and October 1999. The following two years he was awarded several international prizes such as a Bambi, a Comet, an ECHO, and the Goldene Europa, the Goldene Kamera and became the first German singer to be nominated for Best Male Act International at MTV Europe Music Awards.

In May 2000, Sasha released his second album ...you throughout Central Europe. Although neither its leading single "Let Me Be the One", nor follow-up singles "Chemical Reaction" and "Owner of My Heart" managed to reach the top ten on the charts, ...you debuted within the top five of the albums charts in Austria, Germany and Switzerland, receiving a gold certification by the Austrian and the German leg of the IFPI. Surfin' on a Backbeat, Sasha's third album was released in October 2001. It reached the top ten of the albums charts in Germany, but charted significantly lower than its predecessors throughout the rest of Europe, reaching the top forty in Switzerland only. It was certified gold by the German leg of the IFPI for more than 200,000 sold copies. A reissue of the album, containing two previously unreleased tracks, was released in July 2002 and produced the 2002 FIFA World Cup television theme "This Is My Time".

=== 2003–2004 ===
By 2003, Sasha started performing as his alter ego Dick Brave, the lead singer of a rockabilly band called Dick Brave & The Backbeats, whose members shared a fictional band history. Inspired by Nick Cave & the Bad Seeds and originally conceived as a humorous lark (Sasha and his fellow musicians André "Adriano Batolba" Tolba, Maik "Mike Scott" Schott, Felix "Phil X Hanson" Wiegand and Martell "Matt L. Hanson" actually "acted" as their alter egos on-stage and during interviews), the quintet recorded a whole album together, including re-arranged cover versions of songs such as Pink's "Get the Party Started", George Michael's "Freedom", and Michael Jackson's "Black or White". Dick This! eventually became Sasha's first number-one record, and produced a remake of 1961's "Take Good Care of My Baby", as a single.

In November 2004, the project was discontinued, following a final concert at the Dortmunder Westfalenhalle on 22 November 2004. On 7 January 2006, the band re-formed temporarily to perform at the wedding party of Pink and motocross racer Carey Hart in Costa Rica.

=== 2005–present ===
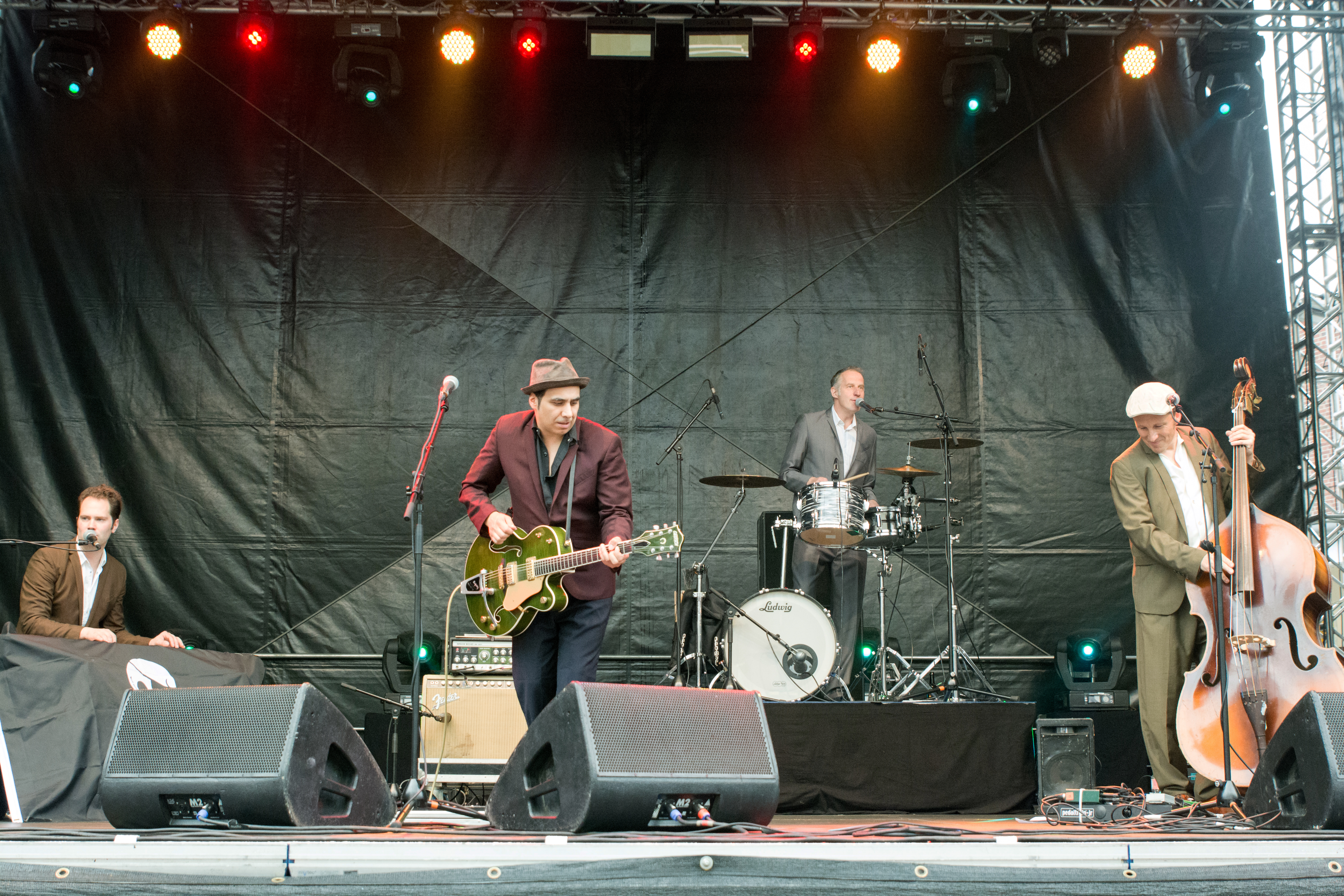
The Backbeats 2016

Following a two years-hiatus, Sasha returned in 2006 with his fourth regular album Open Water. Sasha was heavily involved in the album's writing and production process, for which he consulted musicians Fabio Trentini and Robin Grubert. The album charted significantly higher than its predecessor Surfin' on a Backbeat (2001) throughout Europe, reaching number seven on the German Albums Chart and the top 40 in Austria and Switzerland, but is Sasha's lowest-selling album, to date. Open Water produced two singles only, including "Slowly" and "Goodbye".

In fall 2006, a Greatest Hits compilation was released which reached number six on the German charts and was eventually certified platinum. In 2007, Sasha released "Hide & Seek", the theme song for the German motion picture Die drei ??? – Das Geheimnis der Geisterinsel, as a single. The song peaked at number eight on the German Singles Chart and, in addition, appeared on a re-release edition of the greatest hits album. On 7 July 2007, he performed at the German leg of Live Earth in Hamburg.

In 2009, his fifth studio album Good News on a Bad Day was released, it had the best sales so far since ...you. In 2011, he returned to his alter ego and released his second album as Dick Brave, Rock'n'Roll Therapy.

In late 2014, Sasha's sixth studio album, The One, was released. On 7 May 2021, Sasha was featured on a remix of the song "Hypa Hypa" by German metalcore band Electric Callboy (formerly Eskimo Callboy).

== Acting career ==
In 2006, Sasha made his big screen debut with a small role in the German comedy film Goldene Zeiten, directed by Peter Thorwarth. The following year he accepted a supporting role in the film adaptation of Why Men Don't Listen and Women Can't Read Maps (2007) alongside Benno Fürmann and Jessica Schwarz. In the film he portrayed the comedic role of a brutal biker. In 2008, Sasha appeared in the German movie Ossi's Eleven, for which he contributed two songs to the soundtrack under the pseudonym Nelson Rogers.

== Discography ==
Studio albums

- Dedicated to... (1998)
- ...you (2000)
- Surfin' on a Backbeat (2001)
- Open Water (2006)
- Good News on a Bad Day (2009)
- The One (2014)
- Schlüsselkind (2018)
- This Is My Time. This Is My Life. (2023)

== Filmography ==
=== Movies ===
- Goldene Zeiten (2006) — guest 3
- Warum Männer nicht zuhören und Frauen schlecht einparken (2007) — Sven
- Ossi's Eleven (2008) — Tommy Beck
- C.I.S. – Chaoten im Sondereinsatz — Lukas Maler (lead role)

=== Television shows ===
- I Can See Your Voice (2020) — first season guest artist
