= Sarah Connor discography =

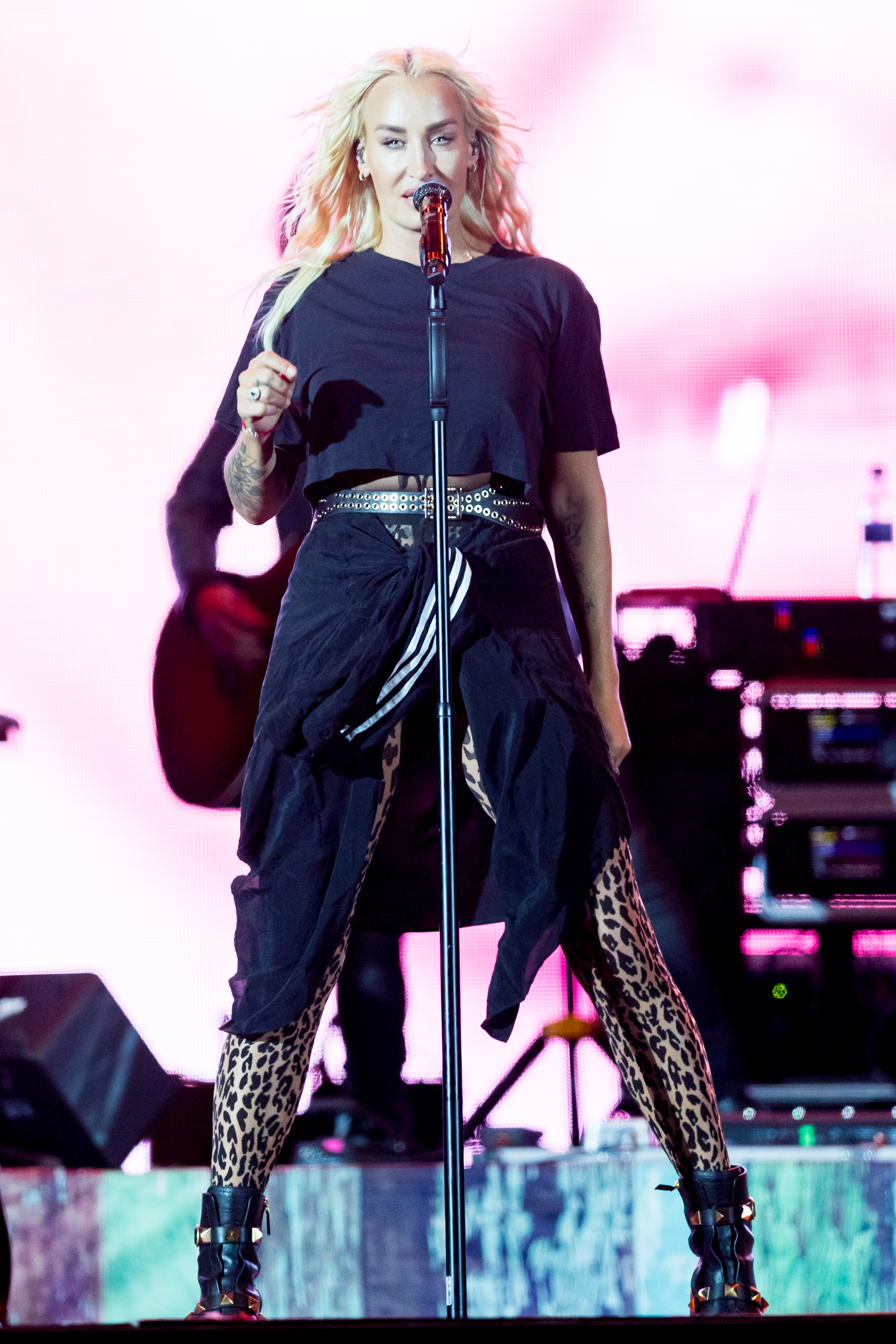
- Connor at Hockenheimring in 2023.
- Studio albums: 11
- Live albums: 3
- Singles: 25
- Video albums: 2
- Music videos: 21

German singer Sarah Connor has released eleven studio albums, one compilation album, two video albums, and more than three dozen singles and music videos. Her debut studio album, Green Eyed Soul, was released in November 2001. It received mixed reviews, but became a commercial success in Germany, where it reached number two on the German Albums Chart and earned triple Gold certification from the Bundesverband Musikindustrie (BVMI). The album's singles "Let's Get Back to Bed – Boy!" and "From Sarah with Love" became international hits, the latter of which reached number one in Germany and Switzerland, the top ten in Austria, Belgium (Flanders), Hungary, and the Netherlands, and was nominated for "Best National Single" at the 2002 ECHO Awards.

Unbelievable, Connor's second album, reached the top ten in Germany and earned a Gold certification from the BVMI. The album's singles "One Nite Stand (Of Wolves and Sheep)", "Skin on Skin", "He's Unbelievable" and "Bounce" charted in various European territories. "Bounce", which samples Mary J. Blige's 2001 single "Family Affair", peaked within the top twenty on the Australian Singles Chart and was certified Gold by the Australian Recording Industry Association (ARIA). Connor's third album, Key to My Soul, produced the number one singles "Music Is the Key" and "Just One Last Dance", which were both certified Gold by the BVMI. Her fourth record, Naughty but Nice, became her first domestic number one and charted within the top three in Austria and Switzerland. Like its predecessor, it produced two German number-one singles, "Living to Love You" and "From Zero to Hero," that were certified Gold.

In 2005, Connor released Christmas in My Heart, her first Christmas album, which reached number six in Germany, Austria and Switzerland, and contained two top five singles, "Christmas in My Heart" and "The Best Side of Life," both of which would rechart frequently in the years after. The singer's fifth studio album, Soulicious, was released in 2007 and mainly composed of cover versions of Motown music from the 20th century. One year later, her sixth album Sexy as Hell was released, and subsequently charted within the top ten on the Austrian, German and Swiss album charts. Its lead single "Under My Skin" reached number four on the German Singles Chart. In 2009, she collaborated with Enrique Iglesias on the top-ten hit "Takin' Back My Love".

Real Love, her first album released in the 2010s, peaked at number eight on the German Albums Chart. It produced two singles, none of which managed to reach the top ten. Following a longer hiatus, Connor released her first German album, Muttersprache, in 2015. It debuted at number-one in Austria and Germany and became the biggest seller within Connor's discography yet, reaching 11× Gold status in Germany. Its lead single "Wie schön du bist" peaked at number two on the German Singles Chart, marking her highest-charting single in a decade. Muttersprache was followed by Herz Kraft Werke, her third chart topper in Germany and first album to reached number-one album on the Austrian Albums Chart. The album was certified double Platinum in Germany and spawned the top ten single "Vincent." In 2022, Connor released her second Christmas album Not So Silent Night. It became her fourth number-one album in Germany.

== Albums ==
=== Studio albums ===
List of studio albums, with selected chart positions and certifications
Title	Album details	Peak chart positions								Certifications
Title	Album details	GER	AUT	POL	HUN	NLD	NOR	SWI	US	Certifications
Green Eyed Soul	Released: 26 November 2001; Label: X-Cell; Format: CD	2	4	4	33	28	17	3	—	BVMI: 3× Gold; IFPI AUT: Gold; IFPI SWI: Gold
Unbelievable	Released: 30 September 2002; Label: X-Cell; Format: CD	10	21	22	—	—	—	19	—	BVMI: Gold; IFPI SWI: Platinum
Key to My Soul	Released: 17 November 2003; Label: X-Cell; Format: CD	8	11	—	—	—	—	12	—	BVMI: Platinum
Sarah Connor	Released: 9 March 2004; Label: Sony; Formats: CD, digital download	—	—	—	—	—	—	—	104	
Naughty but Nice	Released: 21 March 2005; Label: X-Cell; Formats: CD, digital download	1	3	10	—	—	—	3	—	BVMI: Platinum; IFPI AUT: Gold; IFPI SWI: Gold
Christmas in My Heart	Released: 18 November 2005; Label: X-Cell; Formats: CD, digital download	6	6	—	—	—	—	6	—	BVMI: Platinum; IFPI SWI: Gold
Soulicious	Released: 30 March 2007; Label: X-Cell; Formats: CD, digital download	6	8	—	—	—	—	10	—	
Sexy as Hell	Released: 22 August 2008; Label: X-Cell; Formats: CD, digital download	3	5	—	—	—	—	7	—	
Real Love	Released: 22 October 2010; Label: X-Cell; Formats: CD, digital download	8	15	—	—	—	—	22	—	
Muttersprache	Released: 22 May 2015; Label: Polydor, Universal; Formats: CD, LP, digital download, streaming	1	3	—	—	—	—	1	—	BVMI: 11× Gold; IFPI AUT: 3× Platinum
Herz Kraft Werke	Released: 31 May 2019; Label: Polydor, Universal; Formats: CD, LP, digital download, streaming	1	1	—	—	—	—	3	—	BVMI: 2× Platinum; IFPI AUT: 2× Platinum; IFPI SWI: Platinum
Not So Silent Night	Released: 18 November 2022; Label: Polydor, Universal; Formats: CD, LP, digital download, streaming	1	7	—	—	—	—	17	—	
Freigeistin	Released: 23 May 2025; Label: Polydor, Universal; Formats: CD, LP, digital download, streaming	1	1	—	—	—	—	2	—	BVMI: Gold
"—" denotes releases that did not chart or was not released.

=== Live albums ===
List of live albums
Title	Album details
Muttersprache Live – Ganz nah	Released: 27 November 2015; Label: Polydor, Universal; Format: CD, digital download
Muttersprache – Live	Released: 26 November 2016; Label: Polydor, Universal; Format: CD, digital download
Herz Kraft Werke – Live	Released: 6 December 2019; Label: Polydor, Universal; Format: CD, digital download

=== Video albums ===
List of video albums, with selected chart positions
Title	Album details	Peak chart positions
Title	Album details	GER
A Night to Remember: Pop Meets Classic	Released: 13 October 2003; Label: X-Cell; Format: DVD	56
Christmas in My Heart	Released: 1 December 2006; Label: X-Cell; Format: DVD	—
"—" denotes releases that did not chart or was not released.

== Singles ==
=== As a main artist ===
List of singles, with selected chart positions and certifications
Title	Year	Peak chart positions										Certifications	Album
Title	Year	GER	AUS	AUT	BEL (FL)	HUN	NLD	ROM	SWE	SWI	UK	Certifications	Album
"Let's Get Back to Bed – Boy!" (featuring TQ)	2001	2	—	5	31	—	57	—	38	9	16	BVMI: Gold; IFPI AUT: Gold	Green Eyed Soul
"French Kissing"	2001	26	—	18	40	—	44	—	—	53	—		Green Eyed Soul
"From Sarah with Love"	2001	1	—	2	6	3	6	2	38	1	—	BVMI: 3× Gold; IFPI AUT: Gold; BEA: Gold; IFPI SWI: Platinum	Green Eyed Soul
"If U Were My Man"	2001	—	—	—	—	—	—	—	—	—	—		Green Eyed Soul
"One Nite Stand (Of Wolves and Sheep)" (featuring Wyclef Jean)	2002	5	—	12	45	10	25	—	57	16	—		Unbelievable
"Skin on Skin"	2002	5	—	5	24	37	35	3	36	16	—		Unbelievable
"He's Unbelievable"	2003	16	77	36	—	—	42	6	—	50	86		Unbelievable
"Bounce"	2003	12	14	20	33	25	—	19	—	14	14	ARIA: Gold	Unbelievable
"Music is the Key" (with Naturally 7)	2003	1	—	6	3	—	—	—	64	2	—	BVMI: Gold	Key to My Soul
"Just One Last Dance" (featuring Natural)	2004	1	—	5	—	—	—	—	—	8	—	BVMI: Gold	Key to My Soul
"Living to Love You"	2004	1	—	2	—	—	—	—	—	1	—	BVMI: Gold; IFPI SWI: Gold	Naughty but Nice
"From Zero to Hero"	2005	1	—	2	—	24	—	40	—	5	—	BVMI: Gold	Naughty but Nice
"Christmas in My Heart"	2005	4	—	6	—	—	—	—	—	4	—	BVMI: Gold	Christmas in My Heart
"The Best Side of Life"	2006	4	—	12	—	—	—	—	—	15	—	BVMI: Platinum	Christmas in My Heart
"The Impossible Dream (The Quest)"	2007	8	—	25	—	—	—	—	—	19	—		Soulicious
"Sexual Healing" (featuring Ne-Yo)	2007	11	—	45	—	—	—	—	—	41	—		Soulicious
"Under My Skin"	2008	4	—	11	—	—	—	—	—	79	—		Sexy as Hell
"I'll Kiss It Away"	2008	21	—	46	—	—	—	—	—	67	—		Sexy as Hell
"Cold as Ice"	2010	16	—	27	—	—	—	—	—	—	—		Real Love
"Real Love"	2010	54	—	—	—	—	—	—	—	—	—		Real Love
"Wie schön du bist"	2015	2	—	11	—	—	—	—	—	30	—	BVMI: 3× Gold; IFPI AUT: 2× Platinum	Muttersprache
"Bedingungslos"	2015	30	—	38	—	—	—	—	—	—	—	BVMI: Gold	Muttersprache
"Kommst du mit ihr"	2016	62	—	—	—	—	—	—	—	—	—	BVMI: Gold	Muttersprache
"Bonnie & Clyde" (with Henning Wehland)	2016	24	—	39	—	—	—	—	—	64	—	BVMI: Gold; IFPI AUT: Gold	Muttersprache
"Augen auf"	2016	87	—	—	—	—	—	—	—	—	—		Muttersprache
"Vincent"	2019	9	—	2	—	—	—	—	—	38	—	BVMI: Platinum; IFPI AUT: 3× Platinum; IFPI SWI: Platinum	Herz Kraft Werke
"Ich wünsch dir"	2019	—	—	—	—	—	—	—	—	—	—	IFPI AUT: Gold	Herz Kraft Werke
"Sind wir bereit?"	2020	—	—	—	—	—	—	—	—	—	—		Herz Kraft Werke
"Bye Bye"	2020	32	—	—	—	—	—	—	—	—	—		Herz Kraft Werke
"Alles in mir will zu dir"	2021	—	—	—	—	—	—	—	—	—	—		Herz Kraft Werke
"Stark"	2021	71	—	—	—	—	—	—	—	—	—		Herz Kraft Werke
"Ring Out the Bells"	2022	41	—	55	—	—	—	—	—	64	—		Not So Silent Night
"Christmas Train (Destination Hope)"	2023	—	—	—	—	—	—	—	—	—	—		Not So Silent Night
"I Wonder" (with Naturally 7)	2023	—	—	—	—	—	—	—	—	—	—		Not So Silent Night
"Heut' ist alles gut"	2025	—	—	—	—	—	—	—	—	—	—		Freigeistin
"Ficka"	2025	33	—	—	—	—	—	—	—	—	—		Freigeistin
"—" denotes a recording that did not chart or was not released in that territory.

=== As a featured artist ===
List of singles, with selected chart positions
Title	Year	Peak chart positions			Album
Title	Year	GER	AUT	SWI	Album
"Takin' Back My Love" (Enrique Iglesias featuring Sarah Connor)	2009	9	19	23	Greatest Hits

=== Other charted songs ===
List of other charted songs, with selected chart positions and certifications
Title	Year	Peak chart positions			Album
Title	Year	GER	AUT	SWI	Album
"I Feel Lonely"	2014	—	44	—	Sing meinen Song – Das Tauschkonzert
"Zuckerpuppen"	2014	63	49	—	Sing meinen Song – Das Tauschkonzert
"Keiner ist wie du"	2014	12	9	22	Sing meinen Song – Das Tauschkonzert
"Das Leben ist schön"	2015	49	—	—	Muttersprache
"Keine ist wie du" (Gregor Meyle & Sarah Connor)	2015	94	71	—	Meylensteine
"The Christmas Song"	2021	57	37	—	Not So Silent Night

== Music videos ==
List of music videos, showing year released and director(s)
Title	Year	Director(s)
"Let's Get Back to Bed – Boy!"	2001	Oliver Sommer
"From Sarah with Love"	2001	Oliver Sommer
"If U Were My Man"	2001	Oliver Sommer
"French Kissing"	2002	Hannes Rossacher, Frank Wilde
"One Nite Stand (Of Wolves and Sheep)"	2002	Daniel Lwowski, Frank Wilde
"Skin on Skin"	2002	Daniel Lwowski, Frank Wilde
"He's Unbelievable"	2003	Phil Griffin
"Bounce"	2003	Daniel Lwowski
"Music Is the Key" (with Naturally 7)	2003	Oliver Sommer
"Just One Last Dance" (with Natural)	2004	Oliver Sommer
"Living to Love You"	2004	Oliver Sommer
"From Zero to Hero"	2005	Oliver Sommer
"Christmas in My Heart"	2005	Oliver Sommer
"The Best Side of Life"	2006	Oliver Sommer
"The Impossible Dream (The Quest)"	2007	Oliver Sommer
"Sexual Healing"	2007	Oliver Sommer
"Under My Skin"	2008	Joern Heitmann
"I'll Kiss It Away"	2008	Oliver Sommer
"Takin' Back My Love" (with Enrique Iglesias)	2009	Ray Kay
"Cold as Ice"	2010	Daniel Lwowski
"Real Love"	2010	Oliver Sommer
"Wie schön du bist"	2015	Gregor Erler
"Bedingungslos"	2015	Gregor Erler
"Kommst du mit ihr"	2016	Julia Patey
"Vincent"	2019	Joern Heitmann
"Ich wünsch dir"	2019	Joern Heitmann
"Sind wir bereit?"	2020	Joern Heitmann
"Bye Bye"	2020	Sarah Connor
"Alles in mir will zu dir"	2021	Joern Heitmann
"Stark"	2021	Joern Heitmann
"The Christmas Song"	2021	Joern Heitmann
"Ring Out the Bells"	2022	Tatjana Wenig
"Not So Silent Night"	2022	Tatjana Wenig
"Christmas 2066"	2022	Tatjana Wenig
"Jolly Time of Year"	2022	Tatjana Wenig
"Heut' ist alles gut"	2025	Ralph Remstedt
"Ficka"	2025	Blaank
"Wilde Nächte"	2025	Jörn Heitmann
