= Sarah Connor (album) =

Studio album by Sarah Connor
- Released: 9 March 2004
- Recorded: 2000–2004
- Genre: R&B; pop
- Length: 42:55
- Label: Sony; Epic
- Producer: Mekong Age; Bülent Aris; Adam Charon; Kay Denar; Jerry Duplessis; Dirk van Gercum; Wyclef Jean; Rufi-Oh; Rob Tyger

Sarah Connor chronology
Key to My Soul (2003)	Sarah Connor (2004)	Naughty but Nice (2005)

Sarah Connor is a studio album by German recording artist Sarah Connor. It was released by Epic Records and Sony Music on 9 March 2004 in the United States, marking her North American debut. It compiles selected songs from her first three studio albums Green Eyed Soul (2001), Unbelievable (2002) and Key to My Soul (2003). Comprising nearly all of her singles released up to then, Sarah Connor includes the number-one hits "From Sarah with Love" and "Music Is the Key", both produced by frequent collaborators Rob Tyger and Kay Denar, as well as production by Bülent Aris, Mekong Age, and American musicians Jerry Duplessis, and Wyclef Jean.

Propelled by the unexpected success of her single "Bounce", the album reached the lower half of US Billboard 200 and debut atop Billboard's Top Heatseekers, the latter of which highlights the sales by new and developing musical recording artists. The collection garnered a mixed reception from American music critics, who felt that the "tracks work because they're qualified by their Europop context. Like the brightest of that genre, they shine like flashy and disposable glowsticks before ultimately terminating."

== Background ==
Sarah Connor was released in 2004 in response to the success of the lead single "Bounce". Connor is Germany's biggest-selling female pop star, but despite singing in English she never seriously attempted to take her music outside of German-speaking countries (she released "Bounce" in England in 2003 with little promotion though as in America it reached the top 20).

In Fall 2003 Sarah released "Key to My Soul" early on during her pregnancy. It was around this time her song "Bounce" was found by some American DJs, who put it on their playlists. Soon "Bounce" featured on playlists across the US and reached number 54. Sony realized they had a potential hit on their hands and decided to try and release a Sarah Connor CD in the US. With no time to record and Sarah on a baby break they decided to release a compilation of her previous singles from all three albums. The album's cover is the same as that of Green Eyed Soul, albeit with the text Green Eyed Soul removed.

The version of "Bounce" included on this compilation is the clean radio edit. This is the mix that was released to US radio (and also featured on the US compilation Now That's What I Call Music! Volume 15, released in March 2004).

== Critical response ==
Professional ratings
Review scores
Source	Rating
AllMusic	3/5 stars
USA Today	2/4 stars

Elysa Gardner, writing for USA Today, found that "Connor may not have the technical prowess of, say, Christina Aguilera or Kelly Clarkson, but her vocal approach, which veers from breathy ostentation to bombastic belting, will sound painfully familiar. So will helium-fueled hip-hop workouts such as the hit "Bounce" and maudlin ballads such as "Music Is the Key," one of several predictable collaborations with male rap and R&B artists. Connor fares better on the relatively crisp, breezy He's Unbelievable and the blithely funky Mary Jane Girls cover "In My House," but in general, her green-eyed soul is a pale facsimile of the real thing." AllMusic editor Johnny Loftus wrote that "like most of Sarah Connor, the tracks work because they're qualified by their Europop context. Like the brightest of that genre, they shine like flashy and disposable glowsticks before ultimately terminating."

== Chart performance ==
Released on 9 March 2004 in Canada and the United States, Sarah Connor debuted and peaked at number 106 on the US Billboard 200. It also debuted atop Billboard's Top Heatseekers chart. Connor was not able to promote the album stateside since she was heavily pregnant with her first child at that time.

== Track listing ==
Credits adapted from the liner notes of Sarah Connor.

No.	Title	Writer(s)	Producer(s)	Length
1.	"Bounce"	Bülent Aris; Toni Cottura; Anthony Freeman	Aris; Dirk van Gercum	3:42
2.	"French Kissing"	Kay Denar; Dr. Dre; Chauncey Hannibal; Teddy Riley; William Steward; Rob Tyger; Lynise Walters	Denar; Tyger	3:36
3.	"Let's Get Back to Bed – Boy!" (featuring TQ)	Denar; Terrance Quaites; Tyger	Denar; Tyger	3:59
4.	"Skin on Skin"	Denar; Tyger	Denar; Tyger	4:03
5.	"One Nite Stand (Of Wolves and Sheep)" (featuring Wyclef Jean)	Connor; Jerry Duplessis; O.G. Fortuna; Jean	Duplessis; Jean	3:58
6.	"He's Unbelievable"	Denar; Tyger	Denar; Tyger	3:27
7.	"Music Is the Key" (featuring Naturally 7)	Denar; Tyger	Denar; Tyger	4:04
8.	"Love Is Color-Blind" (featuring TQ)	Denar; Quaites; Tyger	Denar; Tyger	4:47
9.	"I'm Gonna Find You (Osla Suite)"	Narada Michael Walden; Florian Richter; Shawn Casselle	Denar; Tyger	4:47
10.	"In My House"	Rick James	Adam Charon; Mekong Age; Rufi-Oh	3:15
11.	"Turn Off the Lights"	Denar; Tyger	Denar; Tyger	3:23

Japanese edition
No.	Title	Writer(s)	Producer(s)	Length
1.	"Bounce"	Bülent Aris; Toni Cottura; Anthony Freeman	Aris; Dirk van Gercum	3:42
2.	"French Kissing"	Kay Denar; Dr. Dre; Chauncey Hannibal; Teddy Riley; William Steward; Rob Tyger; Lynise Walters	Denar; Tyger	3:36
3.	"Let's Get Back to Bed – Boy!" (featuring TQ)	Denar; Terrance Quaites; Tyger	Denar; Tyger	3:59
4.	"One Nite Stand (Of Wolves and Sheep)" (featuring Wyclef Jean)	Connor; Jerry Duplessis; O.G. Fortuna; Jean	Duplessis; Jean	3:58
5.	"He's Unbelievable"	Denar; Tyger	Denar; Tyger	3:27
6.	"Music Is the Key" (featuring Naturally 7)	Denar; Tyger	Denar; Tyger	4:04
7.	"Love Is Color-Blind" (featuring TQ)	Denar; Quaites; Tyger	Denar; Tyger	4:47
8.	"I'm Gonna Find You (Osla Suite)"	Narada Michael Walden; Florian Richter; Shawn Casselle	Denar; Tyger	4:47
9.	"Wait 'Til You Hear from Me"	Denar; Tyger	Denar; Tyger	4:19
10.	"From Sarah with Love"	Connor; Denar; Tyger	Denar; Tyger	5:08
11.	"Turn Off the Lights"	Denar; Tyger	Denar; Tyger	3:23
12.	"Bounce" (Cool & Dre Urban Remix)	Aris; Cottura; Freeman	Cool & Dre	3:42
13.	"Bounce" (Album Version)	Aris; Cottura; Freeman	Denar; Tyger	3:42

Sample credits

- "Bounce" contains a sample from "Family Affair" (2001), performed by Mary J. Blige.
- "French Kissing" contains samples from "Tom's Diner" (1987) and "No Diggity" (1996), performed by American singer Suzanne Vega and Blackstreet respectively.
- "He's Unbelievable" contains a sample from "California Love" (1995), performed by Tupac Shakur.
- "Love Is Color-Blind" interpolates "Canon in D Major" (1680), written by Johann Pachelbel.

== Charts ==
Chart (2004)	Peak position
US Billboard 200	106
US Heatseekers Albums (Billboard)	1
