= A Night to Remember: Pop Meets Classic =

2003 live concert film

- Directed by: Rudie Dolezal; Hannes Rossacher
- Produced by: George Glueck
- Starring: Sarah Connor
- Edited by: Tatia Stubb, Michaela Kalleyer
- Music by: The Vision Symphony Orchestra Choir & Band
- Distributed by: Sony Entertainment Germany
- Release date: October 13, 2003 (Germany)
- Running time: 125 minutes

Sarah Connor Live in Concert – A Night to Remember: Pop Meets Classic is the first live DVD released by German pop star Sarah Connor. It was recorded live on January 24, 2003, at Altes Kesselhaus in Düsseldorf, Germany.

There are three sets. The first set starts with 5 of Sarah's songs all performed in a bit of a classical way. The second set involves 4 of Sarah's more pop like tracks and more dancing. The third and final set involves covering some pop standards such as "I Say a Little Prayer" and "Summertime". The concert finishes with her signature song "From Sarah with Love" and her then current single "One Nite Stand (of Wolves and Sheep)". All the songs performed were from Sarah's first two albums, Green Eyed Soul and Unbelievable, as well as the four covers.

The DVD features a bonus track (a cover of The Beatles' "Yesterday"), a making of featurette, gallery, special web link, an interview with Connor about the songs, a discography with song snippets, and performances of two songs with multiple angles. The DVD also offers English subtitles (the songs were in English, but she spoke in German).

== Track listing ==
=== Ballad set ===
1. Overture
2. That's The Way I Am
3. He's Unbelievable
4. Beautiful
5. Where Did U Sleep Last Night?
6. Skin on Skin

=== Pop/R&B set ===
1. Bounce
2. In My House
3. If U Were My Man
4. Let's Get Back to Bed – Boy!

=== Covers set ===
1. Get Here
2. I Say a Little Prayer
3. A Natural Woman
4. Summertime

=== Finale ===
1. From Sarah with Love
2. One Nite Stand (of Wolves and Sheep)
3. Yesterday (bonus track)

== Charts ==
Chart	Position
German Charts	56
