= Naughty but Nice (album) =

Naughty But Nice

Studio album by Sarah Connor
- Released: 21 March 2005
- Length: 55:43
- Label: X-Cell
- Producers: Bülent Aris; Kay D.; Rob Tyger

Sarah Connor chronology
Sarah Connor (2004)	Naughty But Nice (2005)	Christmas in My Heart (2005)

Singles from Naughty but Nice
- 1. "Living to Love You" Released: 8 November 2004; 2. "From Zero to Hero" Released: 7 March 2005

Naughty but Nice is the fourth studio album by German singer Sarah Connor. It was released by X-Cell and Epic Records on 21 March 2005 in German-speaking Europe. As with her previous projects, Connor consulted production and songwriting duo Rob Tyger and Kay Denar to work with her on the album, with frequent collaborator Bülent Aris also returning following his absence on Key to My Soul (2003). In addition, Johnny Douglas, Terri Bjerre, Emily Friendship, and Ivo Moring scored songwriting credits.

The album earned largely mixed to negative reviews from critics. A commercial success however, Naughty but Nice became Connor's first album to reach the top of the German Albums Chart. It also peaked at number three in both Austria and Switzerland, becoming her highest-charting album in Austria yet. It was eventually certified platinum by the Bundesverband Musikindustrie (BVMI) and reached gold status in Austria and Switzerland, making it Connor's biggest-selling album since her debut (2001).

Heavily promoted through her ProSieben reality show Sarah and Marc in Love (2005), Naughty but Nice spawned two singles, including Connor's third consecutive number-one hit "Living to Love You", and her fourth number-one single "From Zero to Hero," the latter of which served as the theme song to 20th Century Fox' animated film Robots. In promotion of the album, Connor embarked on her third concert tour, the Naughty but Nice Tour, from October to November 2005.

== Promotion ==
Naughty but Nice was preceded by lead single "Living to Love You," released on 8 November 2004. The ballad became her third consecutive number-one hit on the German Singles Chart, following "Music Is the Key" (2003) and "Just One Last Dance" (2003), as well as her fourth overall. The song also reached number two in Austria and became Connor's second chart topper on the Swiss Singles Chart.

Follow-up single "From Zero to Hero;" issued on 7 March 2005, also served as the theme song to 20th Century Fox' animated film Robots (2005) in which Connor voiced the character Cappy (originally voiced by Halle Berry). It became her fifth number-one hit on the German Singles Chart and peaked at number two in Austria and number five in Switzerland. Album cut "I Just Started Being Bad" was used as the theme song for Connor's reality show Sarah and Marc in Love (2005). In promotion of the album, Connor embarked on her third concert tour, the Naughty but Nice Tour, from October to November 2005.

== Critical reception ==
Professional ratings
Review scores
Source	Rating
AllMusic	3/5 stars
CDStarts	5/10
laut.de	1/5 stars
MTV Asia	1/10

The album earned largely mixed to negative reviews from critics. CDStarts critic Matthias Reichel found that the album heavily tried and tested ideas from other songwriters but noted: "Nevertheless, the present work leaves a better impression than its predecessor Key to My Soul, which cannot only be described as a quick release in retrospect. With Naughty but Nice the quality curve points slightly upwards again." AllMusic rated the album three out of five stars.

In a negative review, Michael Schuh from laut.de found that Naughty but Nice "offers 15 warbling numbers that were made for the ringtone industry, and of course you'll look in vain for guitar riffs as well as good beats in these unimaginative soul adaptations [...] Musically, with Naughty But Nice, [Connor] remains at most a role model for people like Jeanette Biedermann, who haven't yet made their mark in the US, but have otherwise made quite a professional contribution to the further development of a very special genre: lower class music. Ivan Thomasz from MTV Asia called Naughty but Nice a "bland pop album" and added: "Backed by saccharine commercial contempo-pop instrumental accompaniment, Sarah's singing is bland and soulless."

== Commercial performance ==
Naughty but Nice debuted at number one on the German Albums Chart in the week of 4 April 2005. While all of the previous album's had reached the top ten of the chart, it marked Connor's first album to claim the top spot. In 2007, Naughty but Nice was certified Platinum by the Bundesverband Musikindustrie (BVMI). Elsewhere, the album reached number three in Austria and Switzerland, where it also reached Gold status the same year. In Austria, Naughty but Nice became Connor's highest-charting album up to then.

== Track listing ==
Naughty but Nice track listing
No.	Title	Writer(s)	Producer(s)	Length
1.	"Living to Love You"	Rob Tyger; Kay Denar	Tyger; Kay D.	4:18
2.	"Paradise" (featuring Mr. Freeman)	Bülent Aris; Terri Bjerre; Ivo Moring; Anthony Freeman	Aris	3:45
3.	"From Zero to Hero"	Tyger; Denar	Tyger; Kay D.	3:46
4.	"I Just Started Being Bad"	Tyger; Denar	Tyger; Kay D.	3:40
5.	"Thank You"	Aris; Freeman	Aris	4:45
6.	"You're the Kinda Man"	Johnny Douglas; Emily Friendship	Tyger; Kay D.	4:43
7.	"One More Night (Part Two of The Osla Suite Trilogy)"	June Rollocks; Aris	Aris	4:22
8.	"Keep Imagining"	Aris; Freeman	Aris	3:59
9.	"Happy Anniversary"	Connor; Marc Terenzi; Freeman	Aris	3:09
10.	"You Are My Desire"	Tyger; Denar	Tyger; Kay D.	3:51
11.	"Change"	Tyger; Denar; Shawn Casselle	Tyger; Kay D.	3:36
12.	"Dolce Vita"	Tyger; Denar; Connor	Tyger; Kay D.	3:57
13.	"Call Me"	Aris; Bjerre; T. Berlin	Aris	4:03
14.	"Ohhh (Private Party)"	Aris; Freeman	Aris	3:46

== Charts ==
=== Weekly charts ===
Weekly chart performance for Naughty but Nice
Chart (2005)	Peak position
Austrian Albums (Ö3 Austria)	3
German Albums (Offizielle Top 100)	1
Swiss Albums (Schweizer Hitparade)	3

=== Year-end charts ===
Year-end chart performance for Naughty but Nice
Chart (2005)	Position
Austrian Albums (Ö3 Austria)	43
German Albums (Official Top 100)	16
Swiss Albums (Schweizer Hitparade)	39

== Certifications and sales ==
Certifications for Naughty but Nice
Region	Certification	Certified units/sales
Austria (IFPI Austria)	Gold	15,000^{*}
Germany (BVMI)	Platinum	200,000^{^}
Switzerland (IFPI Switzerland)	Gold	20,000^{^}
^{*} Sales figures based on certification alone.^{^} Shipments figures based on certification alone.
