= Christmas in My Heart =

Christmas in My Heart may refer to:

- Christmas in My Heart (Sarah Connor album), 2005 album by German pop singer Sarah Connor
  - "Christmas in My Heart" (Sarah Connor song), 2005 single from Sarah Connor's album of the same name
  - Christmas in My Heart (DVD), 2005 live DVD from Sarah Connor
- "Christmas in My Heart" (The Jets song), 1986 single from The Jets' album Christmas with The Jets
- Christmas in My Heart (Connie Francis album), 1959 album by American singer Connie Francis
- Christmas in My Heart (Gretchen Wilson album), 2013
- Christmas in My Heart (film), a 2021 Hallmark television film
