= Sarah Connor =

Sarah Connor may refer to:

- Sarah Connor (singer), German pop and R&B singer
  - Sarah Connor (album), 2004 album by the singer above
- Sarah Connor (Terminator), fictional character in the Terminator movie franchise
  - Terminator: The Sarah Connor Chronicles, television series featuring the above fictional character

== See also ==
- Sarah O'Connor, American molecular biologist
