= Soulicious =

Soulicious may refer to:

- Soulicious (Cliff Richard album)
- Soulicious (Sarah Connor album)
