= Sarah & Marc in Love =

- Also known as: Sarah and Marc in Love
- Genre: Reality television
- Starring: Marc Terenzi; Sarah Connor; Frank Matthée; Lulu Lewe; Full starring see: Cast
- Country of origin: Germany
- Original language: German
- No. of episodes: 14

Production
- Running time: approx. 60:00 (per episode)

Original release
- Network: ProSieben
- Release: 28 June – 16 August 2005

Sarah & Marc in Love is a German reality television series following German pop singer Sarah Connor and her American former boy band member fiancé Marc Terenzi as they prepare for their wedding ceremony. Described as a "docusoap", the series was broadcast over nine weeks in the summer of 2005 and achieved strong ratings for the ProSieben network.

== Background ==
Sarah Connor and Marc Terenzi were both big stars in Germany when they met in 2003. Marc was a member of the boy band Natural at the time and Sarah was releasing her highly successful second album Unbelievable. At the time Marc's manager Lou Pearlman had wanted the relationship kept quiet but when Sarah became pregnant with their son in 2003 it could no longer be kept quiet. The two eloped and Sarah gave birth to their son Tyler in February 2004.

In the summer of 2005 the couple participated in a reality show called Sarah and Marc in Love. The episodes were an hour long and in the style of other celebrity couple reality shows such as Newlyweds: Nick and Jessica. The show was mainly in German though there were parts in English with German subtitles (usually when the couple fought and Marc only spoke English.)

The episodes mainly revolved around planning the wedding and the hardships accompanying that though other episodes had different themes such as Marc recording his album, Sarah recording her part for Robots, and Sarah's German national anthem scandal. The finale was an extended episode showing the day and night of the wedding, where the couple successfully remarried. Sarah's next single "Living to Love You" went to No. 1 and Marc's song "Love to be Loved by You" (which was his wedding present to Sarah and sung during the ceremony) went to No. 3.

A DVD of the series was released on 25 November 2005 in Germany.

== Cast ==
- Sarah Connor
- Marc Terenzi
- Tyler (son)
- Frank (wedding planner)
- Soraya (Sarah's mother)
- Michael Leve (Sarah's father)
- Sophia Luisa (Sarah's sister)
- Valentina (Sarah's sister)
- Marisa (Sarah's sister)
- Anna Maria (Sarah's sister)
- Robin (Sarah's brother)
- Mike (Marc's cousin)

== Episodes ==
- Aller Anfang ist schwer (Every Beginning Is Hard)
- Memories
- Wasserspiele (Playing in Water)
- Allianz-Arena
- Knock out
- Relax, Sarah
- Ich mach dich "fresh" (I'll Make You "Fresh")
- Sarah in Sorge (Sarah in Trouble)
- Man muss auch mal NEIN sagen können (Sometimes One Must Be Able to Say NO)
- Ein Indianer kennt keinen Schmerz (An Indian Does Not Know Pain)
- Wer ist der Killer? (Who Is the Killer?)
- Wild, Wild West
- Ich sehe was, was du nicht siehst (I Spy with My Little Eye)
- Die Party des Jahres (The Party of the Year)
