= Just One Last Dance =

2004 single by Sarah Connor

Single by Sarah Connor featuring Natural

from the album Key to My Soul
- Released: 1 March 2004
- Length: 4:29
- Label: X-Cell; Epic
- Songwriters: Rob Tyger; Kay Denar
- Producers: Kay D.; Rob Tyger

Sarah Connor singles chronology
"Music Is the Key" (2003)	"Just One Last Dance" (2004)	"Living to Love You" (2004)

Natural singles chronology
"Let Me Just Fly" (2004)	"Just One Last Dance" (2004)	"Why It Hurts" (2005)

"Just One Last Dance" is a song by German recording artist Sarah Connor. It was written and produced by Kay Denar and Rob Tyger for her third studio album, Key to My Soul (2003). X-Cell Records released a duet version of the song, featuring guest vocals by Connor's then-husband Marc Terenzi's former band, Natural, on 1 March 2004 as the second and final single from the album. Lyrically, "Just One Last Dance" alludes to couple's final dance in a Spanish cafe before they are forced to part ways.

The song attained commercial success throughout Central Europe. In Germany, it became Connor's third chart-topper, after "From Sarah with Love" and previous single "Music Is the Key", as well as one of the 30 best-selling singles of 2004, eventually reaching gold status. Elsewhere in Europe, "Just One Last Dance" reached the top 10 in Austria, the Czech Republic, and Switzerland. A music video, directed by Oliver Sommer and filmed in Orlando, portrays Connor and Terenzi as a high school couple.

== Critical reception ==
Eberhard Dobler, writing for laut.de, found that on "Just One Last Dance" Connor's "velvety, sometimes lasciviously roughened voice [...] indulges in the kitschy side of soul pop." CDStarts critic Matthias Reichel called "Just One Last Dance" a "mix of "From Sarah with Love" and "Skin on Skin"."

== Chart performance ==
"Just One Last Dance" debuted at number one on the German Singles Chart in the week of 15 March 2004. It became Connor's third chart topper in Germany after "From Sarah with Love" (2001) and previous single "Music Is the Key" (2003). It would remain seven weeks within the chart's top ten and was eventually certified Gold by the Bundesverband Musikindustrie (BVMI).

== Music video ==
A music video for "Just One Last Dance" was directed by Oliver Sommer and filmed in Orlando, Florida. Inspired by West Side Story, it portrays Connor as a high school girl who falls in love with a rivaling football player (Terenzi), much to her brother's dismay. Terenzi's band mates Ben Bledsoe, Michael "J" Horn, Michael Johnson, and Patrick King also appear in the visuals.

== Track listings ==
All tracks written and produced by Kay Denar and Rob Tyger.

CD single
No.	Title	Length
1.	"Just One Last Dance" (radio version)	4:11
2.	"Just One Last Dance" (college radio version)	4:02

CD maxi single
No.	Title	Length
1.	"Just One Last Dance" (radio version)	4:11
2.	"Just One Last Dance" (college radio version)	4:02
3.	"Just One Last Dance" (Kayrob dance RMX)	3:53
4.	"Just One Last Dance" (video version)	4:28
5.	"Work It Right Tonight"	5:00
6.	"Just One Last Dance" (video)	4:28

== Charts ==
=== Weekly charts ===
2004 weekly chart performance for "Just One Last Dance"
Chart (2004)	Peak position
Austria (Ö3 Austria Top 40)	5
CIS Airplay (TopHit) Kayrod Dance remix	40
Czech Republic (IFPI)	3
Europe (European Hot 100 Singles)	11
Germany (GfK)	1
Russia Airplay (TopHit) Kayrod Dance remix	29
Switzerland (Schweizer Hitparade)	8
Ukraine Airplay (TopHit) Kayrod Dance remix	68

2008 weekly chart performance for "Just One Last Dance"
Chart (2008)	Peak position
Ukraine Airplay (TopHit) Kayrod Dance remix	55

=== Year-end charts ===
Year-end chart performance for "Just One Last Dance"
Chart (2004)	Position
Austria (Ö3 Austria Top 40)	39
CIS Airplay (TopHit)	183
Germany (Media Control GfK)	22
Russia Airplay (TopHit)	118
Switzerland (Schweizer Hitparade)	32

== Certifications ==
Certifications for "Just One Last Dance"
Region	Certification	Certified units/sales
Germany (BVMI)	Gold	150,000^{^}
^{^} Shipments figures based on certification alone.
