= From Zero to Hero =

2005 single by Sarah Connor

Single by Sarah Connor

from the album Naughty but Nice
- B-side: "When a Woman Loves a Man"
- Released: 7 March 2005
- Length: 3:46
- Label: X-Cell; Epic
- Songwriters: Rob Tyger; Kay Denar
- Producers: Kay D.; Rob Tyger

Sarah Connor singles chronology
"Living to Love You" (2004)	"From Zero to Hero" (2005)	"Christmas in My Heart" (2005)

"From Zero to Hero" is a song by German recording artist Sarah Connor, written and produced by Rob Tyger and Kay Denar for Connor's fourth studio album, Naughty but Nice (2005). The song was released on 7 March 2005 as the album's second and final single and moreover served as the European theme song for the 2005 20th Century Fox animated film Robots, in which Connor voiced the character of Cappy. It became Connor's fifth number-one hit (and fourth in a row) in Germany, staying atop the German Singles Chart for three nonconsecutive weeks.

== Track listings ==
European CD single

1. "From Zero to Hero" (single version) – 3:45
2. "From Zero to Hero" (I-Wanna-Funk-with-You radio cut) – 4:01

European maxi-CD single

1. "From Zero to Hero" (single version) – 3:45
2. "From Zero to Hero" (I-Wanna-Funk-with-You radio cut) – 4:01
3. "From Zero to Hero" (I-Wanna-Funk-with-You extended version) – 5:47
4. "When a Woman Loves a Man" – 4:31

== Charts ==
=== Weekly charts ===
Chart (2005)	Peak position
Austria (Ö3 Austria Top 40)	2
CIS Airplay (TopHit)	100
Europe (Eurochart Hot 100)	6
Germany (GfK)	1
Hungary (Editors' Choice Top 40)	24
Romania (Romanian Top 100)	40
Russia Airplay (TopHit)	103
Switzerland (Schweizer Hitparade)	5
Ukraine Airplay (TopHit)	78

=== Year-end charts ===
Chart (2005)	Position
Austria (Ö3 Austria Top 40)	23
Europe (Eurochart Hot 100)	73
Germany (Media Control GfK)	15
Romania (Romanian Top 100)	68
Switzerland (Schweizer Hitparade)	38

== Certifications ==
Region	Certification	Certified units/sales
Germany (BVMI)	Gold	150,000^{^}
^{^} Shipments figures based on certification alone.
