= The Best Side of Life =

Single by Sarah Connor

from the album Christmas in My Heart
- Released: 24 November 2006
- Length: 3:45
- Label: X-Cell
- Songwriter(s): Marc Lennard; JoHo HF
- Producer(s): Kay D.; Rob Tyger

Sarah Connor singles chronology
"Christmas in My Heart" (2005)	"The Best Side of Life" (2006)	"The Impossible Dream (The Quest)" (2007)

"The Best Side of Life" is a song by German recording artist Sarah Connor. It was released by X-Cell Records as the lead single from the 2006 reissue of her first Christmas album, Christmas in My Heart (2005), accompanying the release of Connor's DVD of the same name. Written by Marc Lennard and Achim Heider under his pseudonym JoHo HF, the Christmas song was produced by frequent collaborators, duo Kay D. and Rob Tyger. A midtempo love song, the instrumentation includes bell chimes and harp sounds. The song's lyrics declare that the protagonist wants for Christmas to be united with her lover and family for the holidays.

The song replaced Melanie Thornton's "Wonderful Dream (Holidays are Coming)" in Coca-Cola's Christmas promotional campaign throughout German-speaking Europe. Commercially, "The Best Side of Life" peaked at number four on the German Singles Chart and reached the top twenty in Austria and Switzerland. It has since made several re-entries on the Media Control Charts, in December of the years 2007 to 2009, and of the years since 2017.

== Music video ==
A music video for "The Best Side of Life" was directed by Oliver Sommer.

== Track listing ==
All tracks produced by Kay Denar and Rob Tyger.

European CD single
No.	Title	Writer(s)	Length
1.	"The Best Side of Life"	Marc Lennard; JoHo HF	3:49
2.	"A Ride in the Snow"	Kay Denar; Rob Tyger	4:02

European CD maxi single
No.	Title	Writer(s)	Length
1.	"The Best Side of Life"	Lennard; HF	3:49
2.	"A Ride in the Snow"	Denar; Tyger	4:02
3.	"Why Does It Rain"	Denar; Tyger	4:28
4.	"A Ride in the Snow" (Live video)		4:10

Notes

- "Why Does It Rain" was inspired by the German christmas carol "Schneeflöckchen, Weißröckchen".

== Charts ==
=== Weekly charts ===
Weekly chart performance for "The Best Side of Life"
Chart (2006–07)	Peak position
Austria (Ö3 Austria Top 40)	12
Czech Republic (Rádio Top 100 Oficiální)	53
Germany (GfK)	4
Switzerland (Schweizer Hitparade)	15

=== Year-end charts ===
Year-end chart performance for "The Best Side of Life"
Chart (2007)	Position
Germany (Official German Charts)	74

== Certifications ==
Certifications for "The Best Side of Life"
Region	Certification	Certified units/sales
Germany (BVMI)	Platinum	300,000^{‡}
^{‡} Sales+streaming figures based on certification alone.
