= Christmas in My Heart (Sarah Connor song) =

Single by Sarah Connor

from the album Christmas in My Heart
- Released: 25 November 2005
- Genre: Pop, soul, Christmas
- Length: 4:46 (album version); 4:14 (single version)
- Label: X-Cell
- Songwriters: Rob Tyger, Kay Denar
- Producers: Kay D., Rob Tyger

Sarah Connor singles chronology
"From Zero to Hero" (2005)	"Christmas in My Heart" (2005)	"The Best Side of Life" (2006)

"Christmas in My Heart" is a song by German singer–songwriter Sarah Connor. It was her first Christmas single and the lead single from her first Christmas album, Christmas in My Heart (2005). Male vocals were provided by Naturally 7 member Dwight Stewart.

After the success of Naughty but Nice, Connor decided to release her first album of Christmas music entitled Christmas in My Heart. The title track "Christmas in My Heart" was released to promote the album and Connor's tour at the time. The single peaked at number four on the German Singles Chart and was Germany's seventy-seventh best-selling single of 2006. It made brief re-entries in the German charts in December of the three years after its release, and, after 12 years of absence, in the years since 2020. It was the last single Connor released until late 2006 when the album was reissued with a new single. The song is also featured on a DVD of the same name released with the reissue in 2006.

== Track listings ==
European CD single

1. "Christmas in My Heart" (Single Version) – 4:14
2. "Christmas in My Heart" (Soulful Xmas Mix) – 4:02

European CD maxi single

1. "Christmas in My Heart" (Single Version) – 4:14
2. "Christmas in My Heart" (Soulful Xmas Mix) – 4:02
3. "Christmas in My Heart" (Full Length Version) – 4:46
4. Xmas Greetings from Sarah – 0:38
5. "A Look Behind the Tour" (Clip) – 3:44

== Charts ==
=== Weekly charts ===
Chart (2005–06)	Peak position
Austria (Ö3 Austria Top 40)	6
Germany (GfK)	4
Switzerland (Schweizer Hitparade)	4

=== Year-end charts ===
Chart (2006)	Position
Germany (Media Control GfK)	77
Switzerland (Schweizer Hitparade)	88

== Certifications ==
Region	Certification	Certified units/sales
Germany (BVMI)	Gold	300,000^{‡}
^{‡} Sales+streaming figures based on certification alone.
