= Living to Love You =

2004 single by Sarah Connor

Single by Sarah Connor

from the album Naughty but Nice
- B-side: "Change"
- Released: 8 November 2004
- Length: 4:16
- Label: X-Cell
- Songwriters: Kay Denar; Rob Tyger
- Producers: Kay D.; Rob Tyger

Sarah Connor singles chronology
"Just One Last Dance" (2004)	"Living to Love You" (2004)	"From Zero to Hero" (2005)

"Living to Love You" is a song by German singer–songwriter Sarah Connor from her fourth studio album, Naughty but Nice (2005). It was written and produced by Rob Tyger and Kay Denar and released as the album's lead single on 8 November 2004. The song reached number one in Germany and Switzerland, becoming Connor's third consecutive chart-topper on the German Singles Chart and fourth overall. "Living to Love You" was the 39th-best-selling single of 2004 and the 35-best-selling single of 2005 in Germany.

== Track listings ==
CD single
No.	Title	Writer(s)	Producer(s)	Length
1.	"Living to Love You" (Single Version)	Rob Tyger; Kay Denar	Tyger; Denar	4:19
2.	"Change"	Tyger; Denar; Shawn Casselle	Tyger; Denar	3:36

Maxi-CD single
No.	Title	Writer(s)	Producer(s)	Length
1.	"Living to Love You"	Tyger; Denar	Tyger; Denar	4:19
2.	"Living to Love You" (78BPM Mix)	Tyger; Denar	Tyger; Denar	3:54
3.	"Living to Love You" (College Radio Version)	Tyger; Denar	Tyger; Denar	4:19
4.	"Change"	Tyger; Denar; Casselle	Tyger; Denar	3:36
5.	"CD Extra Part"

== Personnel and credits ==
Credits adapted from the liner notes of Naughty but Nice.

- Sarah Connor – vocals
- Kay Denar – arranger, producer, writer
- George Glueck – executive producer
- Rob Tyger – arranger, producer, writer

== Charts ==
=== Weekly charts ===
Chart (2004)	Peak position
Austria (Ö3 Austria Top 40)	2
CIS Airplay (TopHit)	149
Europe (Eurochart Hot 100)	6
Germany (GfK)	1
Russia Airplay (TopHit)	130
Switzerland (Schweizer Hitparade)	1

=== Year-end charts ===
Chart (2004)	Position
Austria (Ö3 Austria Top 40)	49
Germany (Media Control GfK)	39
Switzerland (Schweizer Hitparade)	58

Chart (2005)	Position
Austria (Ö3 Austria Top 40)	54
Europe (Eurochart Hot 100)	90
Germany (Media Control GfK)	35
Switzerland (Schweizer Hitparade)	17

== Certifications ==
Region	Certification	Certified units/sales
Germany (BVMI)	Gold	150,000^{^}
^{^} Shipments figures based on certification alone.
