= Key to My Soul =

Studio album by Sarah Connor
- Released: 17 November 2003
- Length: 52:06
- Label: Epic
- Producer: Kay D.; Brock Landers; Stephen Shape; Rob Tyger

Sarah Connor chronology
Unbelievable (2002)	Key to My Soul (2003)	Sarah Connor (2004)

Singles from Key to My Soul
- 1. "Music Is the Key" Released: 3 November 2003; 2. "Just One Last Dance" Released: 1 March 2004

Professional ratings
Review scores
Source	Rating
CDStarts.de	4/10 stars
laut.de	2/5 stars

Key to My Soul is the third studio album by German recording artist Sarah Connor. It was released by X-Cell and Epic Records on 17 November 2003 in German-speaking Europe. As with her previous albums, Green Eyed Soul (2001) and Unbelievable (2002), Connor reunited with songwriting and production duo Rob Tyger and Kay Denar to work on the majority of the album, with Diane Warren, TQ, Wayne Wilkins, and Connor's then-husband Marc Terenzi receiving songwriting credits and Brock Landers and Stephen Shape producing "Daddy's Eyes".

The album received generally mixed reviews from critics, with laut.de declaring its mixture of mainstream pop, contemporary R&B and soft hip hop beats as too polished and repetitive. Upon its release, Key to My Soul peaked at number eight on the German Albums Chart, becoming Connor's third consecutive top 10 album, while reaching the top 20 in Austria and Switzerland. Released weeks ahead the birth of her first child, the album spawned two singles only, including "Music Is the Key" featuring American a cappella group Naturally 7 and a remix version of "Just One Last Dance" featuring American boy band Natural, both of which became number-one hits in Germany.

== Track listing ==
Key to My Soul track listing
No.	Title	Writer(s)	Producer(s)	Length
1.	"Music Is the Key" (featuring Naturally 7)	Rob Tyger; Kay Denar	Tyger; Kay D.	4:37
2.	"Love Is Color-Blind" (featuring TQ)	Tyger; Denar; Terrance Quaites	Tyger; Kay D.	4:46
3.	"Just One Last Dance"	Tyger; Denar	Tyger; Kay D.	4:29
4.	"My Intuition"	Tyger; Denar; Wayne Wilkins; Avril MacKintosh; Maya Singh	Tyger; Kay D.	4:29
5.	"Daddy's Eyes"	Brock Landers; Stephen Shape	Landers; Shape	4:08
6.	"Whatcha Wearing?" (Interlude)	Tyger; Denar	Tyger; Kay D.	0:45
7.	"¡Hasta la vista!"	Tyger; Denar	Tyger; Kay D.	3:44
8.	"I'm Gonna Find You (Osla Suite)"	Tyger; Denar; Shawn Casselle	Tyger; Kay D.	4:46
9.	"When Two Become One"	Tyger; Denar; Sarah Connor	Tyger; Kay D.	4:51
10.	"Are U Ready to Ride?"	Tyger; Denar; Casselle	Tyger; Kay D.	3:34
11.	"For the People"	Tyger; Denar	Tyger; Kay D.	3:19
12.	"I Want Some of That"	Diane Warren	Tyger; Kay D.	3:38
13.	"At the Station" (Interlude)	Tyger; Denar; Connor	Tyger; Kay D.	0:44
14.	"Every Moment of My Life"	Tyger; Denar; Connor; Marc Terenzi	Tyger; Kay D.	4:15
15.	"Turn Off the Lights"	Tyger; Denar	Tyger; Kay D.	3:23
Total length:				52:06

== Charts ==
=== Weekly charts ===
Weekly chart performance for Key to My Soul
Chart (2003)	Peak position
Austrian Albums (Ö3 Austria)	11
German Albums (Offizielle Top 100)	8
Swiss Albums (Schweizer Hitparade)	12

=== Year-end charts ===
Year-end chart performance for Key to My Soul
Chart (2004)	Position
German Albums (Official Top 100)	58

== Certifications ==
Certifications for Key to My Soul
Region	Certification	Certified units/sales
Germany (BVMI)	Platinum	200,000^{^}
^{^} Shipments figures based on certification alone.
