= Robots (2005 film) =

2005 American animated film

- Theatrical release poster
- Directed by: Chris Wedge
- Screenplay by: David Lindsay-Abaire; Lowell Ganz; Babaloo Mandel
- Story by: Ron Mita; Jim McClain; David Lindsay-Abaire
- Produced by: Jerry Davis; John C. Donkin; William Joyce
- Starring: Ewan McGregor; Halle Berry; Greg Kinnear; Mel Brooks; Amanda Bynes; Drew Carey; Robin Williams
- Edited by: John Carnochan
- Music by: John Powell
- Production companies: 20th Century Fox Animation; Blue Sky Studios
- Distributed by: 20th Century Fox
- Release dates: March 6, 2005 (Mann Village Theatre); March 11, 2005 (United States and Canada)
- Running time: 90 minutes
- Country: United States
- Language: English
- Budget: $75–80 million
- Box office: $262.5 million

Robots is a 2005 American animated science fiction comedy film directed by Chris Wedge and written by David Lindsay-Abaire, Lowell Ganz and Babaloo Mandel. Produced by 20th Century Fox Animation and Blue Sky Studios, it stars the voices of Ewan McGregor, Halle Berry, Greg Kinnear, Mel Brooks, Amanda Bynes, Drew Carey and Robin Williams. The story follows ambitious robot inventor Rodney Copperbottom (McGregor), who seeks employment at the company of his idol Bigweld (Brooks) in Robot City, but discovers a plot by its new CEO Phineas T. Ratchet (Kinnear) and his mother (Broadbent) to forcibly upgrade the city's populace and eradicate struggling robots, known as "outmodes".

Development of the film began in 2000, following a failed attempt by Wedge and children's author William Joyce to adapt Joyce's children's book Santa Calls. They instead decided to create an original story based on robots. The project was approved by executive producer Chris Meledandri in 2001 and production began the next year.

Robots premiered at the Mann Village Theatre in Westwood, Los Angeles, on March 6, 2005, and was released in the United States on March 11 by 20th Century Fox. The film received positive reviews from critics, with praise for its humor, animation and performances, while its story was deemed somewhat formulaic. The film was commercially successful, grossing $262.5 million worldwide against a $75–80 million budget. A sequel was discussed but never produced due to the studio’s heavier focus on its flagship franchise, Ice Age.

== Plot ==
In a world of robots, Rodney Copperbottom, son of Herb and Lydia Copperbottom, is an aspiring young inventor from the city of Rivet Town. He idolizes Bigweld, a famous inventor and philanthropist whose company, Bigweld Industries, employs other inventors and provides poor robots with spare parts. Rodney develops the diminutive Wonderbot to assist his father, who works as a dishwasher in a restaurant. When Herb's boss, Mr. Gunk, confronts them, however, Wonderbot malfunctions and wreaks havoc in the kitchen.

To help Herb pay for the damages, Rodney travels to Robot City, hoping to present Wonderbot to Bigweld Industries. However, upon his arrival, Rodney is ejected from Bigweld Industries by its new CEO, Phineas T. Ratchet. In Bigweld's absence, Ratchet has discontinued production of spare parts and inventions for the poor outmoded robots, prioritizing expensive "upgrades". Meanwhile, Ratchet's mother Madame Gasket runs the Chop Shop, a facility that recycles scrap metal collected by her Sweepers, including that of deceased or outmoded robots, into ingots for upgrades.

Rodney befriends Fender Pinwheeler, a ne'er-do-well who introduces him to a group of outmoded robots known as the "Rusties". Rodney and his new friends help to fix outmodes throughout the neighborhood, but they are eventually unable to cope with the demand due to the spare part shortage. Hoping to enlist Bigweld's help, Rodney and Fender infiltrate the Bigweld Ball, but Ratchet announces that Bigweld will not attend. An enraged Rodney confronts Ratchet, who orders his security team to eliminate him. Cappy, an executive opposed to Ratchet, rescues Rodney and Fender. While Fender is captured and taken to the Chop Shop by a Sweeper, he discovers their plan to scrap all outmoded robots with new machines designed to destroy them.

Rodney and Cappy fly to Bigweld's mansion, where he lives as a recluse and reveals that Ratchet's greed led to his resignation and refuses to help them. A distraught Rodney calls his parents, but Herb inspires him to fight for his dreams. Fender escapes the Chop Shop and exposes Ratchet's plot. Rodney rallies the Rusties, and Bigweld, reinvigorated by Rodney's spirit, joins them to stop Ratchet. Rodney and his friends return to Bigweld Industries where Ratchet attempts to dispose of Bigweld, who ends up being rolled into the Chop Shop. Rodney upgrades the Rusties and leads them in a battle against Ratchet, Gasket, and their army of workers and Sweepers. Gasket is eventually flung into the incinerator and destroyed, and Ratchet is stripped of his upgrades and left chained with his father.

Retaking control of Bigweld Industries, Bigweld holds a public ceremony in Rivet Town, where he nominates Rodney as his new second-in-command and eventual successor. Rodney provides Herb with new replacement parts and a flugelhorn-like instrument to fulfill his life-long dream of being a musician. Herb leads the townspeople in a rendition of "Get Up Offa That Thing".

== Voice cast ==
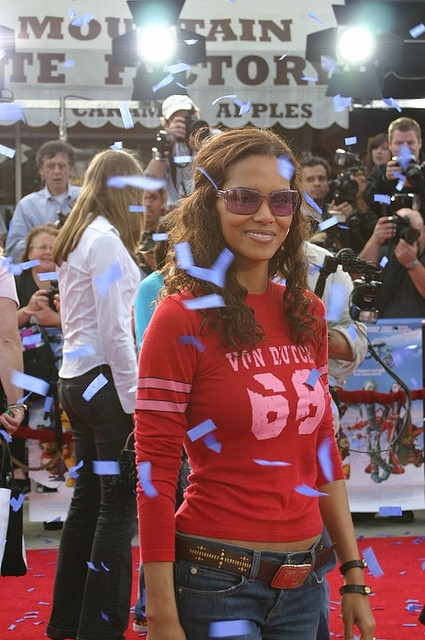
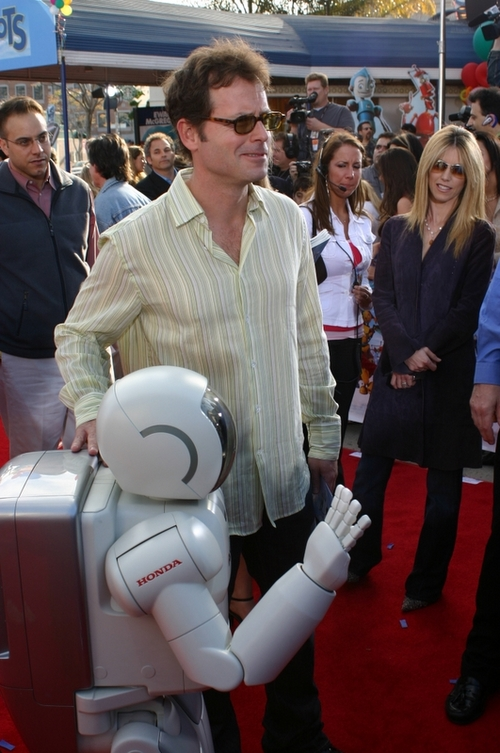
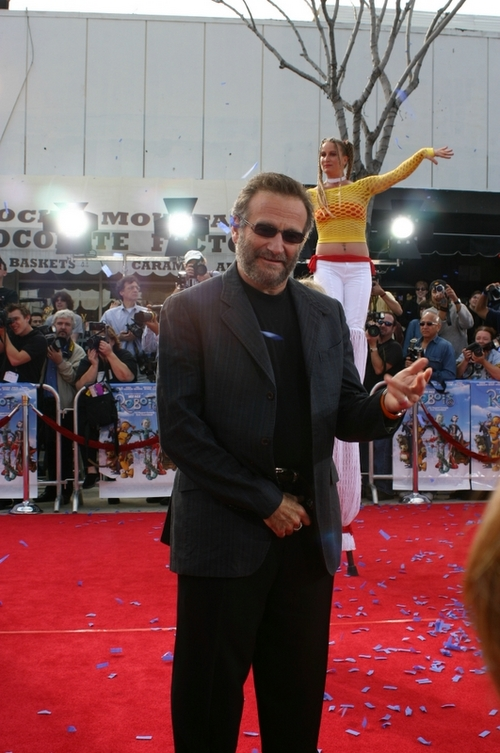
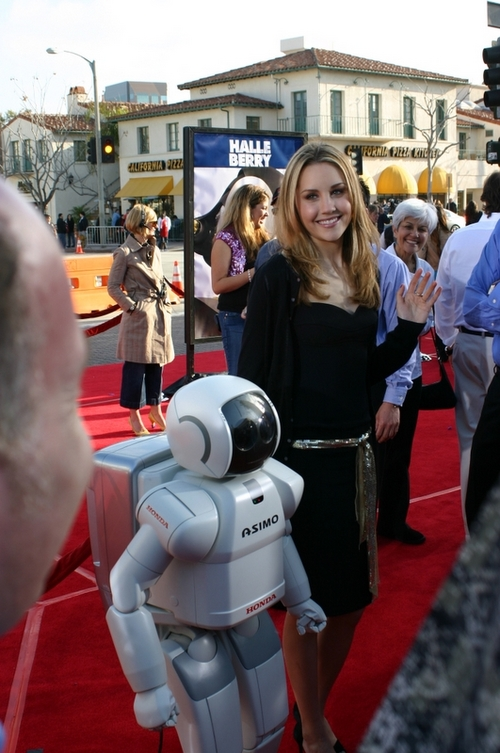
Halle Berry (Cappy), Greg Kinnear (Ratchet), Robin Williams (Fender), Amanda Bynes (Piper) and Honda's ASIMO robot at the film's premiere in Westwood, Los Angeles
- Ewan McGregor as Rodney Copperbottom, an idealistic young blue robot and aspiring inventor
  - Will Denton and Crawford Wilson as young Rodney
  - Jansen Panettiere as younger Rodney
  - Dylan Denton as youngest Rodney
- Halle Berry as Cappy, a straight-laced executive at Bigweld Industries and Rodney's love interest
- Robin Williams as Fender Pinwheeler, a mischievous red blender-like robot who befriends Rodney and is constantly falling apart
- Mel Brooks as Bigweld, an elderly spherical robot who is the caring inventor, philanthropist and founder of Bigweld Industries; he was also the host of The Bigweld Show from Rodney's childhood
- Greg Kinnear as Phineas T. Ratchet, the menacing and arrogant right-hand-robot of Bigweld, and Madame Gasket's son
- Jim Broadbent as Madame Gasket, the evil owner of the Chop Shop and Ratchet's mother
- Amanda Bynes as Piper Pinwheeler, a plucky yellow tomboy robot who is Fender's younger sister and has a crush on Rodney
- Drew Carey as Crank Casey, a cynical orange vacuum cleaner-like robot who befriends Rodney
- Jennifer Coolidge as Aunt Fanny (or Aunt Fan in the UK and Australian dubs), a motherly snail-like robot who takes in outmoded and homeless robots
- Harland Williams as Lugnut or "Lug", an imposing but good-natured green muscular robot who befriends Rodney along with his best friend Diesel, a slim, mute robot who lacks a voice box
- Stanley Tucci as Herb Copperbottom, Rodney's father and a dishwasher at Gunk's Greasy Spoon
- Dianne Wiest as Lydia Copperbottom, Rodney's mother
- Chris Wedge as Wonderbot, a small cup-like robot with a propeller who is Rodney's invention
  - Wedge also voices a Phone Booth
- Natasha Lyonne (US dub) / Cat Deeley (UK dub) / Jackie O (Australian dub) as Loretta Geargrinder, a receptionist at Bigweld Industries and Fender's love interest
- Paul Giamatti as Tim, the mean-spirited puppet gatekeeper at Bigweld Industries
- Dan Hedaya as Mr. Gunk, Herb's cynical, inconsiderate boss
- Alan Rosenberg as Jack Hammer, a rusty copperish orange robot who works at a hardware store
- Brian Scott McFadden (US dub)/Vernon Kay (UK dub) as Trashcan Bot
- Jay Leno as Fire Hydrant
- Lucille Bliss as Pigeon Lady
- Paula Abdul and Randy Jackson (US dub) / Isabella Rullo, Alannah Hayes, Kirstyn Clews, Caleb Pirie, Lizzy Hickey, and Eloise Givney (Australian dub) as Wristwatches
- Al Roker as Mailbox
- Marshall Efron as a Lamp Post
  - Efron also voices a Toilet Bot, a bass drum, and a microphone
- Randall Montgomery as Zinc, a ramshackle car robot
- Stephen Tobolowsky (US dub) / Eamonn Holmes (UK dub) as Bigmouth Executive
  - Tobolowsky also voices Forge
- Tim Nordquist as Tin Man
- Damien Fahey (US dub) / Chris Moyles (UK dub) as stage announcer
- Lowell Ganz (US dub) / Terry Wogan (UK dub) as Mr. Gasket, Madame Gasket's husband and Ratchet's father

Archival recordings from James Earl Jones and James Brown are used for voice boxes that the silent robot Diesel tries.

== Production ==
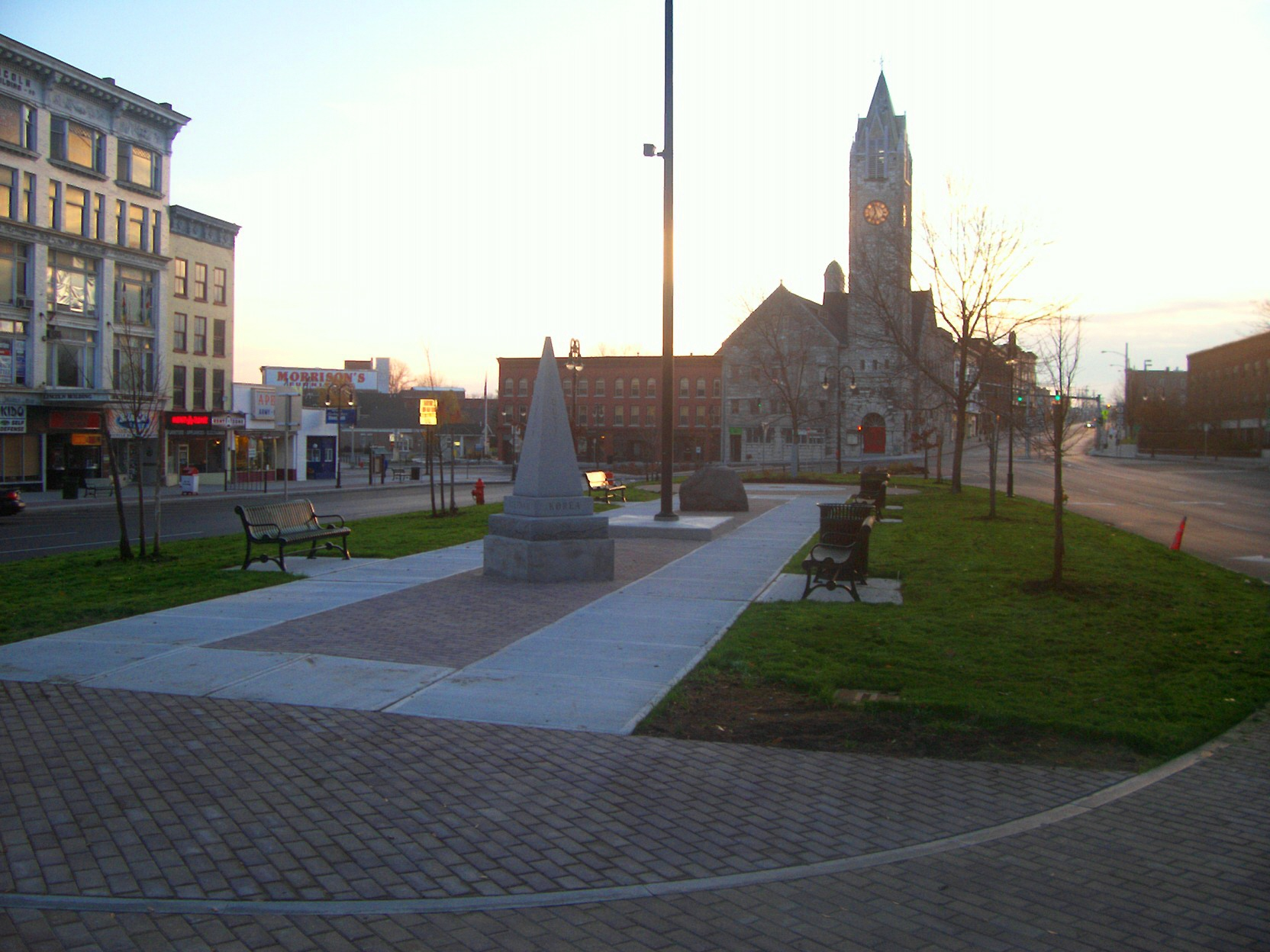
Rivet Town was rumored to be based on Watertown, New York, where director Chris Wedge lived during his teens. However, Wedge dismissed this in an interview.

Initially, Chris Wedge and William Joyce wanted to make a film adaptation of Joyce's 1993 book Santa Calls. After a failed animation test in 2000 (which resulted in 20th Century Fox Animation declining to make the film), Wedge and Joyce decided to instead develop an original story about a world of robots. In 2001, the duo pitched the concept to Fox Animation president Chris Meledandri, as a visual idea. Although not initially impressed, Meledandri agreed to greenlight the film and served as its executive producer. The film began production in 2002, shortly after Ice Age was released. Wedge reunited with the crew from his first film, including Carlos Saldanha as the co-director. In June 2003, the film was announced by Fox at the American Museum of Natural History's IMAX theater. This announcement confirmed the entire cast and slated the film for its 2005 release.

== Release ==
Robots was originally scheduled for a 2004 release, but the release date was changed to 2005. The film had its world premiere on March 6, 2005, in Westwood, Los Angeles, and it was released theatrically on March 11, 2005. The film was the first to feature the new trailer for Star Wars: Episode III – Revenge of the Sith; it was reported that Star Wars fans went to see the movie just to see the trailer and hear the voice of Ewan McGregor, who also played Obi-Wan Kenobi in the Star Wars prequel trilogy, as Rodney Copperbottom. The film also featured the exclusive trailer for Blue Sky's next film Ice Age: The Meltdown, then called Ice Age 2. Robots was digitally re-mastered into IMAX format (IMAX DMR) and released in select IMAX theaters around the world. It was the first 20th Century Fox film that was released on the same day on IMAX and conventional 35mm screens. It was also the first IMAX DMR film released in the spring season, and the second IMAX DMR film distributed by Fox.

=== Home media ===
Robots was released on DVD and VHS in both fullscreen and widescreen versions on September 27, 2005, by 20th Century Fox Home Entertainment. The film's DVD release was accompanied by an original short animated film based on Robots, titled Aunt Fanny's Tour of Booty. The short is a prequel to the film, as it takes place during Fender's arrival in Robot City. In the short, Aunt Fanny gives a tour of the Robot City Train Station to a motley collection of robots, including Fender Pinwheeler, Zinc, Tammy, Hacky and an Old Lady-Bot.

The film was released in high definition on Blu-ray on March 22, 2011.

== Reception ==
=== Box office ===
The film was released on March 11, 2005, in the United States and Canada and grossed $36 million in 3,776 theaters in its opening weekend, ranking #1 at the box office. It grossed a total of $260.7 million worldwide: $128.2 million in the United States and Canada, and $132.5 million in other territories.

=== Critical response ===
On Rotten Tomatoes, the film has an approval rating of 64% based on 181 reviews, with an average rating of 6.6/10. The site's consensus reads: "Robots delights on a visual level, but the story feels like it came off an assembly line." Metacritic gives the film a weighted average score of 64 out of 100 based on 33 reviews, indicating "generally favorable reviews". Audiences surveyed by CinemaScore gave the film an "A" on a scale of A+ to F.

Roger Ebert of the Chicago Sun-Times gave the film three and a half stars out of four, stating that "this is a movie that is a joy to behold entirely apart from what it is about. It looks happy, and, more to the point, it looks harmonious."

Caroline Westbrook of Empire magazine gave the film a three stars out of five, and said, "Kids will love it and their adult companions will be warmly entertained—but it's far from a computer-animated classic."

Rob Mackie of The Guardian gave the film three stars out of five, saying that it "skillfully combines adult and kids' comedy. But for all the imaginative splendours and a sharp script, Robots is never quite as distinctive as its predecessor, Ice Age."

Common Sense Media gave the film four stars out of five, calling it an "endearing 'follow your dreams' story with plenty of laughs".

=== Accolades ===
Robots won an ASCAP award in the category of top box-office films. The movie received two Annie Award nominations (Outstanding Character Design in a Feature Production and Outstanding Production Design in an Animated Feature Production; both for William Joyce and Steve Martino for the latter) and two Kids' Choice Award nominations (Favorite Animated Movie and Favorite Voice From an Animated Movie for Robin Williams's performance as Fender). Robots was also nominated for a Teen Choice Award (Choice Movie: Animated/Computer Generated) and a Visual Effects Society Award.

The film is recognized by American Film Institute in these lists:

- 2008: AFI's 10 Top 10: Nominated Animation Film

== Music ==
=== Score ===
Robots: Original Motion Picture Score

Film score by John Powell
- Released: March 15, 2005
- Recorded: 2004
- Genre: Score
- Length: 43:41
- Labels: Varèse Sarabande; Fox Music

Robots: Original Motion Picture Score was composed by John Powell, conducted by Pete Anthony, performed by the Hollywood Studio Symphony and released on March 15, 2005, by Varèse Sarabande and Fox Music.

| No. | Title | Length |
|---|---|---|
| 1. | "Overture" | 4:02 |
| 2. | "Rivet Town Parade" | 0:54 |
| 3. | "Bigweld TV / Creating Wonderbot" | 2:45 |
| 4. | "Wonderbot Wash" | 2:08 |
| 5. | "Train Station" | 3:50 |
| 6. | "Crosstown Express" | 1:19 |
| 7. | "Wild Ride" | 1:36 |
| 8. | "Madame Gasket" | 1:00 |
| 9. | "Chop Shop" | 1:50 |
| 10. | "Meet The Rusties" | 2:06 |
| 11. | "Bigweld Workshop" | 3:13 |
| 12. | "Phone Booth" | 1:29 |
| 13. | "Gathering Forces" | 3:28 |
| 14. | "Escape" | 4:42 |
| 15. | "Deciding to Fight Back" | 1:13 |
| 16. | "Attack of the Sweepers" | 1:26 |
| 17. | "Butt Whoopin'" | 3:42 |
| 18. | "Homecoming" | 1:33 |
| 19. | "Dad's Dream" | 1:25 |
| Total length: | | 43:41 |

Other songs in the film include

- "Underground" – Tom Waits
- "Shine" – Ricky Fanté (end credits)
- "Can't Get Enough of Your Love, Babe" – Barry White
- "...Baby One More Time" – Britney Spears
- "See Me" – Melanie Blatt
- "Eye of the Tiger" – Survivor
- "From Zero to Hero" – Sarah Connor
- "Gonna Make You Sweat (Everybody Dance Now)" – C+C Music Factory and Freedom Williams
- "(There's Gotta Be) More to Life" – Stacie Orrico
- "Right Thurr" – Chingy
- "Low Rider" – War
- "I Like That" – Houston
- "Get Up Offa That Thing" – James Brown
- "Un Héroe Real" - Aleks Syntek
- "Wonderful Night" - Fatboy Slim
- "Walkie Talkie Man" - Steriogram

== Video games ==
A video game based on the film was released on February 24, 2005, for the Game Boy Advance, GameCube, Nintendo DS, PlayStation 2, Xbox, and Windows. It was developed by Eurocom for home consoles and Windows, and by Griptonite Games for the Game Boy Advance and Nintendo DS. It was published by Vivendi Universal Games. The game received mixed or average reviews from critics.

== Legacy ==
=== Cancelled sequel ===
Following the success of the first film, both Wedge and Joyce have expressed interest in making a sequel. Plans for the sequel were being worked on, but the film was left unproduced and cancelled.

=== Proposed director's cut ===
In light of the Release the Snyder Cut movement and the closure of Blue Sky Studios, a movement to release a director's cut of Robots gained traction in 2022. A proposed director's cut was first mentioned on the film's original DVD audio commentary with Wedge and Joyce, in which Wedge said that there would be alternate takes in certain scenes, and that Cappy would have been more fleshed out.
