= Soulicious (Sarah Connor album) =

Soulicous

Studio album by Sarah Connor
- Released: 30 March 2007
- Studio: Saal 4 (Berlin, Germany)
- Length: 52:22
- Label: X-Cell
- Producer: Kay D.; Rob Tyger

Sarah Connor chronology
Christmas in My Heart (2005)	Soulicous (2007)	Sexy as Hell (2008)

Singles from Soulicious
- 1. "The Impossible Dream (The Quest)" Released: 30 March 2007; 2. "Sexual Healing" Released: 29 June 2007; 3. "Son of a Preacher Man" Released: 2007

Soulicious is the sixth studio album by German singer–songwriter Sarah Connor, released in German-speaking Europe on 30 March 2007 by X-Cell Records. Entirely produced by Kay Denar and Rob Tyger, the album consists of a collection of cover versions of Motown music from the 1960s, 1970s, and 1980s, apart from two original tracks, "Soothe My Soul" and the title track "Soulicious".

== Critical reception ==
Professional ratings
Review scores
Source	Rating
CDStarts	4/10
laut.de	2/5 stars

AllMusic editor Jon O'Brien found that Soulicious features "faithful renditions of '60s, '70s, and '80s Motown classics." Jochim Gauger from laut.de rated the album two stars out of five.

== Track listing ==
Soulicious track listing
No.	Title	Writer(s)	Length
1.	"The Impossible Dream (The Quest)"	Joe Darion; Mitch Leigh	3:35
2.	"Soothe My Soul"	Sarah Connor; Rob Tyger; Kay Denar	4:18
3.	"Your Precious Love" (duet with Marvin Gaye)	Nickolas Ashford; Valerie Simpson	3:27
4.	"Get It Right"	Luther Vandross; Marcus Miller	4:19
5.	"Part Time Love"	David Gates	3:30
6.	"Sexual Healing"	Marvin Gaye; Odell Brown; David Ritz	4:10
7.	"Son of a Preacher Man"	John Hurley; Ronnie Wilkins	2:31
8.	"Soulicious"	Connor; Tyger; Denar	3:47
9.	"Love on a Two-Way Street"	Sylvia Robinson; Bert Keyes	3:45
10.	"One Day I'll Fly Away"	Joe Sample; Will Jennings	4:20
11.	"I've Got to Use My Imagination"	Gerry Goffin; Barry Goldberg	3:17
12.	"I Never Loved a Man (The Way I Love You)"	Ronnie Shannon	2:59
13.	"Same Old Story (Same Old Song)"	Sample; Jennings	4:23
14.	"If It's Magic"	Stevie Wonder	3:11
Total length:			52:22

== Charts ==
=== Weekly charts ===
Weekly chart performance for Soulicious
Chart (2007)	Peak position
Austrian Albums (Ö3 Austria)	8
European Top 100 Albums (Billboard)	24
German Albums (Offizielle Top 100)	6
Swiss Albums (Schweizer Hitparade)	10

=== Year-end charts ===
Year-end chart performance for Soulicious
Chart (2007)	Position
German Albums (Official Top 100)	84
