= Christmas in My Heart (Sarah Connor album) =

Studio album by Sarah Connor
- Released: 18 November 2005
- Length: 46:05
- Label: X-Cell
- Producer: Rob Tyger; Kay Denar

Sarah Connor chronology
Naughty but Nice (2005)	Christmas in My Heart (2005)	Soulicious (2007)

Singles from Christmas in My Heart
- 1. "Christmas in My Heart" Released: 25 November 2005; 2. "The Best Side of Life" Released: 24 November 2006

Christmas in My Heart is the first Christmas album and the fifth studio album by German recording artist Sarah Connor. It was released by X-Cell Records on 18 November 2005 in German-speaking Europe. Produced by frequent collaborators Rob Tyger and Kay Denar, Christmas in My Heart consists of twelve tracks, featuring two original songs and ten cover versions of Christmas standards and carols, some of which were translated from German into English for the first time.

The album peaked at number six on the charts in Austria, Germany, and Switzerland, eventually earning gold certification in Switzerland and platinum in Germany. Its lead single, "Christmas in My Heart," became a top-five Christmas hit in both Germany and Switzerland. In 2006, a reissue of the album was released, featuring the previously unreleased song "The Best Side of Life." In February 2007, a live DVD of the same name was released, featuring Connor performing songs from the album at a Christmas concert in Ischgl.

== Promotion ==
Christmas in My Heart was preceded by its same-titled lead single, released in November 2005. The song reached number four in Germany and Switzerland and peaked at number six on the Austrian Singles Chart. To promote the album's 2006 reissue, X-Cell Records released the previously unreleased tracks "The Best Side of Life" as a single. Featured in Coca-Cola's German Christmas promotional campaign, it also reached number four on the German Singles Chart. Elsewhere, "The Best Side of Life" became a top 20 hit in Austria and Switzerland.

== Critical reception ==
Professional ratings
Review scores
Source	Rating
CDStarts	6/10

Matthias Reichel from CDStarts gave the album a 6/10 rating. He wrote: "The arrangements blending R&B and pop, combined with new English lyrics for classic German Christmas [...] create a unique atmosphere and sometimes lead to astonished disbelief [...] For Connor fans and non-purists, Christmas in My Heart is a great way to get into the Christmas spirit. But on December 24th, the originals have to come back out — because "Oh du Fröhliche, oh du Selige" as a pumping funk groover is just a bit too much."

== Commercial performance ==
In Germany, Christmas in My Heart opened at number nine on the German Albums Chart in the week of 2 December 2005. It eventually peaked at number six the following week and earned a platinum certification from the Bundesverband Musikindustrie (BVMI) for shipments figures in excess of 200,000 units. In Austria, the album opened at number 17 on the Austrian Albums Chart. It peaked at nunber six in the week ending 6 January 2006. In Switzerland, Christmas in My Heart debuted at number twelve on the Swiss Albums Chart. It also peaked number six on in the week of 25 December 2005. Still in 2005, it was certified gold by the International Federation of the Phonographic Industry (IFPI).

== Track listing ==
All songs produced by Rob Tyger and Kay D.

Christmas in My Heart – Standard edition
No.	Title	Writer(s)	Length
1.	"Ave Maria"	Rob Tyger; Kay Denar; Franz Schubert	3:58
2.	"Christmas in My Heart"	Tyger; Denar	4:48
3.	"Be Thankful"	Traditional; Tyger; Denar	3:33
4.	"White Christmas"	Irving Berlin	3:36
5.	"Sweet Is the Song"	Traditional; Tyger; Denar	3:40
6.	"A Ride in the Snow"	Tyger; Denar	4:02
7.	"Why Does It Rain"	Traditional; Tyger; Denar	4:28
8.	"The Christmas Song"	Bob Wells; Mel Tormé	3:16
9.	"Tonight's The Night"	D.J. Falk; Tyger; Denar	4:06
10.	"A New Kingdom"	Eduard Ebel; Tyger; Denar	3:45
11.	"Come Together"	Traditional; Tyger; Denar	4:12
12.	"Have Yourself a Merry Little Christmas"	Hugh Martin; Ralph Blane	2:47

Christmas in My Heart – Reissue edition
No.	Title	Writer(s)	Length
1.	"The Best Side of Life"	Marc Lennard; Achim "Jojo HF" Heider	3:49
2.	"Ave Maria"	Rob Tyger; Kay Denar; Franz Schubert	3:58
3.	"Christmas in My Heart"	Tyger; Denar	4:48
4.	"Be Thankful"	Traditional; Tyger; Denar	3:33
5.	"White Christmas"	Irving Berlin	3:36
6.	"Sweet Is the Song"	Traditional; Tyger; Denar	3:40
7.	"A Ride in the Snow"	Tyger; Denar	4:02
8.	"Why Does It Rain"	Traditional; Tyger; Denar	4:28
9.	"The Christmas Song"	Bob Wells; Mel Tormé	3:16
10.	"Tonight's The Night"	D.J. Falk; Tyger; Denar	4:06
11.	"A New Kingdom"	Eduard Ebel; Tyger; Denar	3:45
12.	"Come Together"	Traditional; Tyger; Denar	4:12
13.	"Have Yourself a Merry Little Christmas"	Hugh Martin; Ralph Blane	2:47

Notes

- "Be Thankful" is an English language interpretation of "Vom Himmel hoch, da komm ich her".
- "Sweet Is the Song" is an English language interpretation of "Süßer die Glocken nie klingen".
- "Why Does It Rain" is an English language interpretation of "Schneeflöckchen, Weißröckchen".
- "Tonight's the Night" is an English language interpretation of "O du fröhliche".
- "A New Kingdom" is an English language interpretation of "Leise rieselt der Schnee".
- "Come Together" is an English language interpretation of "Morgen, Kinder wird's was geben".

== Charts ==
Chart performance for Christmas in My Heart
Chart (2005)	Peak position
Austrian Albums (Ö3 Austria)	6
German Albums (Offizielle Top 100)	6
Swiss Albums (Schweizer Hitparade)	6

== Certifications and sales ==
Certifications for Christmas in My Heart
Region	Certification	Certified units/sales
Germany (BVMI)	Platinum	200,000^{^}
Switzerland (IFPI Switzerland)	Gold	15,000^{^}
^{^} Shipments figures based on certification alone.

== Release history ==
Christmas in My Heart release history
Region	Date	Format	Edition(s)
Austria	18 November 2005	Digital download; CD	Standard
Germany	18 November 2005	Digital download; CD	Standard
Switzerland	18 November 2005	Digital download; CD	Standard
Austria	24 November 2006	Digital download; CD	Reissue
Germany	24 November 2006	Digital download; CD	Reissue
Switzerland	24 November 2006	Digital download; CD	Reissue
Austria	16 November 2007	Digital download; CD	Reissue digipack
Germany	16 November 2007	Digital download; CD	Reissue digipack
Switzerland	16 November 2007	Digital download; CD	Reissue digipack
