= Sarah Connor (singer) =

German singer (born 1980)

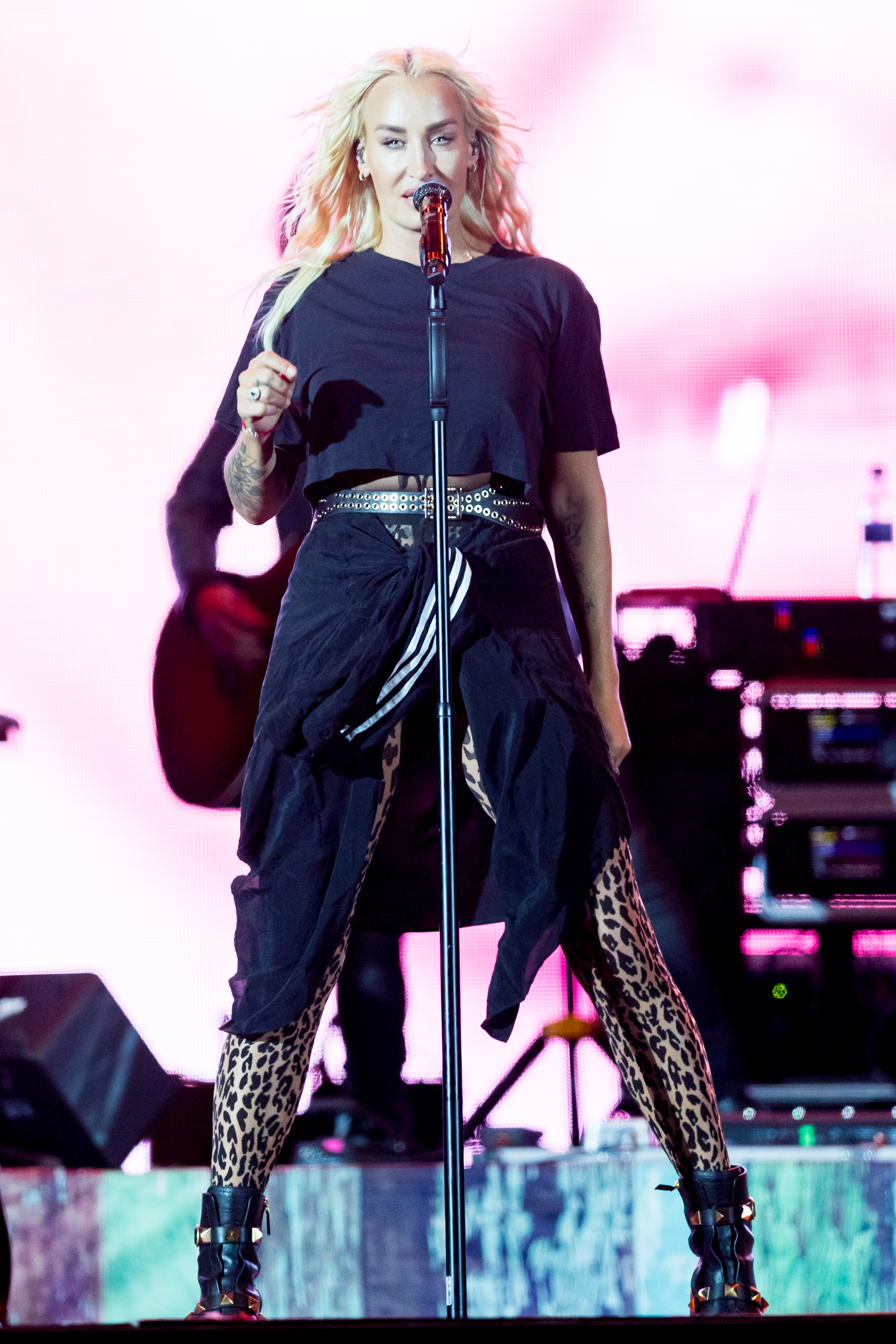
- Connor performing in 2023

Background information
- Born: Sarah Marianne Corina Lewe; 13 June 1980 (age 46); Delmenhorst, West Germany
- Genres: Pop; R&B
- Occupations: Singer; songwriter
- Years active: 2000–present
- Spouse: Marc Terenzi (m. 2004; div. 2010) Florian Fischer (m. 2013)
- Website: sarah-connor.com

Sarah Terenzi-Fischer (born Sarah Marianne Corina Lewe; 13 June 1980), known professionally as Sarah Connor, is a German pop singer. She rose to prominence after she signed with X-Cell Records in 2000 and released her debut album Green Eyed Soul (2001) the following year. She followed it with a series of successful albums, including Unbelievable (2002), Key to My Soul (2003), Naughty but Nice (2005), Christmas in My Heart (2005), Soulicious (2007), Sexy as Hell (2008) and Real Love (2010). Several songs from these albums became hit singles on the pop record charts, including the number-one hits "From Sarah with Love", "Music is the Key", "Just One Last Dance", "Living to Love You" and "From Zero to Hero". In 2015, Connor's first German language project Muttersprache became her second chart-topper after a decade.

Her popularity was further enhanced by the ProSieben reality television series Sarah & Marc in Love (2005) and Sarah & Marc Crazy in Love (2008) alongside her then-husband Marc Terenzi, chronicling their marriage and careers. In 2010, she returned to television to become a judge on the debut season of the German X Factor adaptation of which she remained part for two further seasons. In 2014, she joined the cast of the debut season of Sing meinen Song – Das Tauschkonzert, the German version of the series The Best Singers whose accompanying compilation album topped the Austrian and German Albums Chart. The following year, she served as a guest coach on the RTL II remake of the talent series Popstars 2015.

Connor has sold seven million albums worldwide and is recognized as one of the most successful German vocalists to emerge in the 2000s. According to GfK Entertainment, she is the first recording act to ever have scored four consecutive chart-topping hits on the German Singles Chart. In 2017, Deutsche Welle ranked her third on its list of the top ten German solo acts who have enjoyed international success. A 13-time nominee, Connor won two Echo Music Prize and has been the recipient of four Comets, a Top of the Pops Award, a Goldene Kamera, a Goldene Europa, and a World Music Award. Separated from Terenzi, father of her first two children, Connor has been in a relationship with her manager Florian Fischer since 2010. The couple have another two children of their own.

== Early life ==
Connor is the eldest of six siblings born to Michael Lewe, a copywriter from New Orleans, and his wife Soraya Lewe-Tacke (née Gray), a former fashion model and homemaker of Scottish, Irish, and German descent, in Hamburg. She has four sisters, including Anna-Maria Lagerblom, the wife of German rapper Bushido, as well as Marisa, Sophia-Luisa, and Valentina; and one brother, Robin. Her maternal half-brothers Mick and Lex were born in 2008, Connor grew up listening to soul music, mostly influenced by her paternal grandfather, a former jazz and R&B pianist from New Orleans. A church choir provided her with her first experience in gospel music at the age of six. In 1989, the family relocated from Hamburg to Delmenhorst, where Connor attended the Max-Planck-Gymnasium (high school). She also enrolled at the local performing arts school, where she received dancing, singing, and acting lessons, which she paid for through waitressing and modelling jobs. After dropping out of school, she completed an internship with RTL Television.

In 1997, Connor and her sister Anna-Maria were picked to sing with the backing choir during the performances of "Earth Song" and "Heal the World" at Michael Jackson's HIStory World Tour in Bremen, Germany. Overwhelmed by a personal meeting with Jackson at the end of the show, she began to record a number of demo tapes under the pseudonym Sarah Gray, including cover versions such as "Silent Night" and "This Christmas" as well as the local radio success "Ula la Ula". In 1998, her boyfriend Martin Scholz, member of the boy band Touché, arranged for Connor to sign a management deal with the group's manager. She subsequently served as their opening act for a Bremen concert in July 1998. Unhappy with her management though, Connor transitioned to the manager Carlo Vista and began work on the single "This Christmas" with the producers Oliver Hintz and Thomas Nöhre. It was released through Villa Records in 1999. Also that year, she provided the leading vocals for the German producer Marc van Linden's trance remix of the 1982 record "Last Unicorn", which reached number eighty-six on the German singles chart. In 2000, music manager George Glueck eventually signed her as Sarah Connor with the Sony subsidiary X-Cell Records.

== Career ==
=== 2001–2003: Breakthrough with "From Sarah with Love" ===
Connor fluctuated between Berlin, Hamburg, and Hanover to work on her R&B and hip hop-driven debut album, involving German music producers Bülent Aris, Rob Tyger and Kay Denar as well as international collaborators such as Eddie Martin and rapper TQ. Its release was preceded by the top five and top 20 hit singles "Let's Get Back to Bed – Boy!" and "French Kissing", respectively, as well as her breakthrough hit, the ballad "From Sarah with Love", which reached the top position in Germany, Poland, Portugal and Switzerland and raised Connor's fame all over Europe. Eventually released in November 2001, Green Eyed Soul generally had mixed reception from music critics, who declared it a mixed bag but considered it a solid career launcher. The album debuted at number two on the German albums chart, and charted within the top five in Austria, Finland and Switzerland, reaching gold status in Austria, Czech Republic, Poland, Portugal and Switzerland, while earning platinum certifications in Finland and Germany. Connor was subsequently awarded a Goldene Europa and won the Echo Music Prize for Best National Rock/Pop Female Artist, among three nominations.

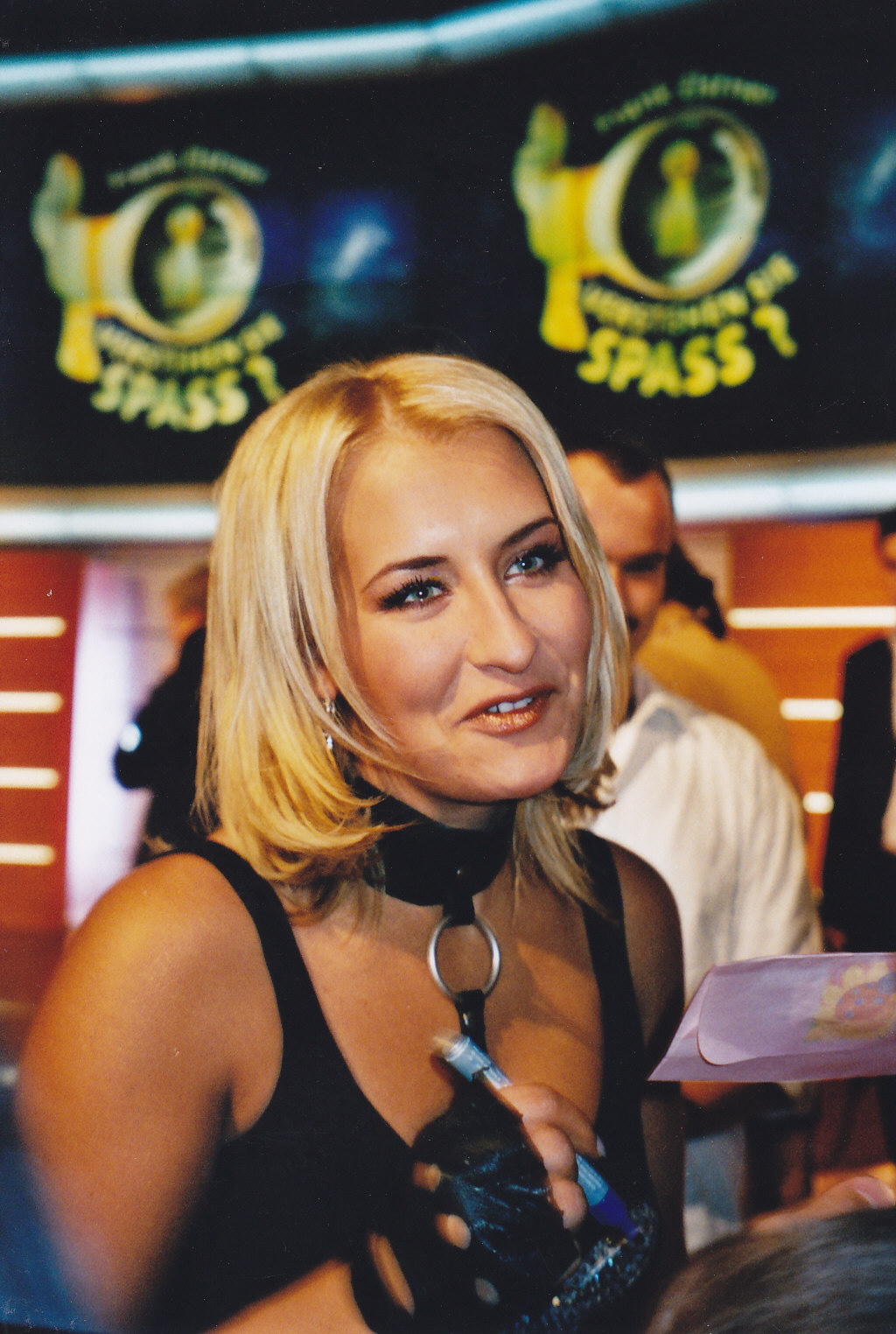
Connor in 2002 at Verstehen Sie Spaß?

The following year, Connor embarked on the Green Eyed Soul Tour in 2002 and began production on her second studio album Unbelievable. A continuation of Green Eyed Soul, she reteamed with Aris, Denar and Tyger to work on the majority of the album, with American musicians Wyclef Jean, Jerry Duplessis, and Diane Warren also joining the project. Jean wrote, produced and rapped on the album's lead single, "One Nite Stand (of Wolves and Sheep)", which once again entered the top 5. Unbelievable simultaneously achieved gold status in Germany within 48 hours and spawned another three singles, including "Skin on Skin", "He's Unbelievable" and "Bounce".

In October 2003, Connor released a live DVD branded Sarah Connor Live – A Night to Remember: Pop Meets Classic, whose performance had been recorded at the Alten Kasselhaus in Düsseldorf on 24 January, including individual performances of own songs with a classical orchestra backing her up. In November 2003, in spite of being heavily pregnant with her first child, Connor released her third album called, Key to My Soul. The album's first single, "Music Is the Key" featuring New York a cappella singers Naturally 7, became her second number-one hit in Germany. "Just One Last Dance", the album's second and final single, was a re-recorded edition of the album's original version, including new vocals by Marc Terenzi's band Natural. The duet once again reached number-one in Austria, Germany, and Switzerland and the top 20 on a composite World Top 40.

The album Sarah Connor featured the first single, "Bounce". It was released in many countries, including Japan, Australia, New Zealand, Canada and the United States. In Germany, the single made it to number 14 on the charts. In England and Ireland, it peaked at number 14 and was certified gold in Australia. In America, the song only managed a number 54 on the Billboard Hot 100. The album made it to number 106 and took off in the U.S., selling almost 100.000 copies.

=== 2004–2008: International success ===
After a lengthy hiatus that saw the birth of her son Tyler, Connor returned to music in fall 2004 with the release of her single "Living to Love You". The ballad reached number-one in Germany and Switzerland, becoming her third consecutive chart-topper, and preceded her fourth album Naughty But Nice (2005). Connor re-teamed with longtime contributors Booya, Kay Denar und Rob Tyger to work on the album, whose release coincided with the broadcast of her ProSieben reality series Sarah & Marc in Love. Her highest-charting effort yet, Naughty But Nice debuted on top of the German Albums Chart and reached the top three in Austria and Switzerland, selling 100,000 copies within the first two days of its release. Critical reaction toward the album was generally-mixed, with Allmusic rating it three starts out of five, and laut.de summing it as "underclass music for the disco around the corner". Spawning just one another single, "From Zero to Hero" was picked to be used as the theme song to the animated film Robots (2005). The song became her fifth chart-topping single in Germany and the fourth number-one hit single in a row. Addidtionally she voiced Cappy in the German dub of the film.

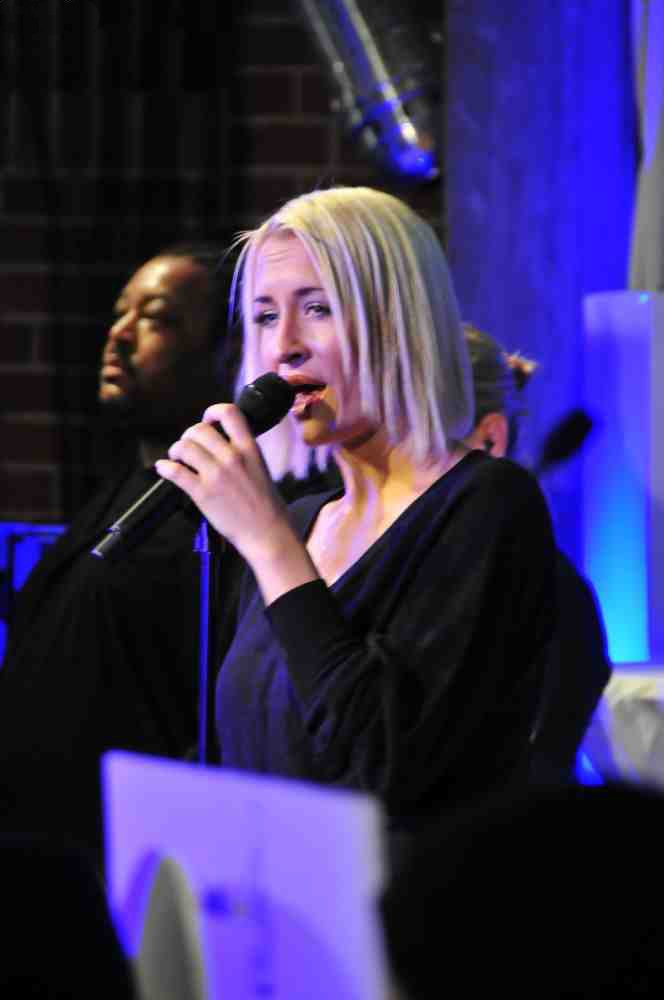
Connor performing live in 2008

In fall 2005, Connor embarked on the Naughty but Nice concert tour. Compiling twenty-three dates in Austria, Germany and Switzerland, the tour concluded a month later. In December 2005, she released a holiday album named Christmas in My Heart. Containing a mix of traditional but contemporary English standards and re-written German songs in English language, both the album and its same-titled lead single reached number four on the charts. Eventually certified platinum by the IFPI, the album was re-released the following year, including the previously unreleased single "The Best Side of Life", another top four success.

Returning from yet another hiatus after the birth of her daughter Summer in 2006, Connor released her sixth studio album Soulicious in March 2007. Mainly made up of 1960s and 70s Motown covers, but also including two original songs, recording for the entire album took place at the former main building of the Berliner Rundfunk, where Connor was backed by a symphonic orchestra of forty-eight musicians. Upon its release, the album reached the top ten in Austria, Germany and Switzerland, where it each reached gold status. Critics, again, gave Soulicious a mixed response, with CDStarts.de calling it "a sterile soul adaption for The Dome stage". Leading single "The Impossible Dream (The Quest)", which was featured in a publicity campaign for the comeback fight of German boxer Henry Maske, and "Sexual Healing", a duet with American singer Ne-Yo, reached the top ten and top twenty of the singles charts respectively.

Heading into a new musical direction, Connor intensified work on her next original album with producers such as Remee, Thomas Troelsen and J. R. Rotem. In May 2008, it was announced Connor and her family would once again participate in an eight-part reality show titled Sarah and Marc: Still Crazy in Love" on ProSieben. The special began airing on 3 July 2008 and followed the recording and promotional events for the new album, branded Sexy as Hell. Its first single, "Under My Skin", co-written by Troelsen, was released on 1 August 2008, in German-speaking Europe, with the album following on 22 August 2008. Subsequently, she was nominated for an ECHO.

=== 2009-present: X-Factor, Real Love, and Muttersprache ===
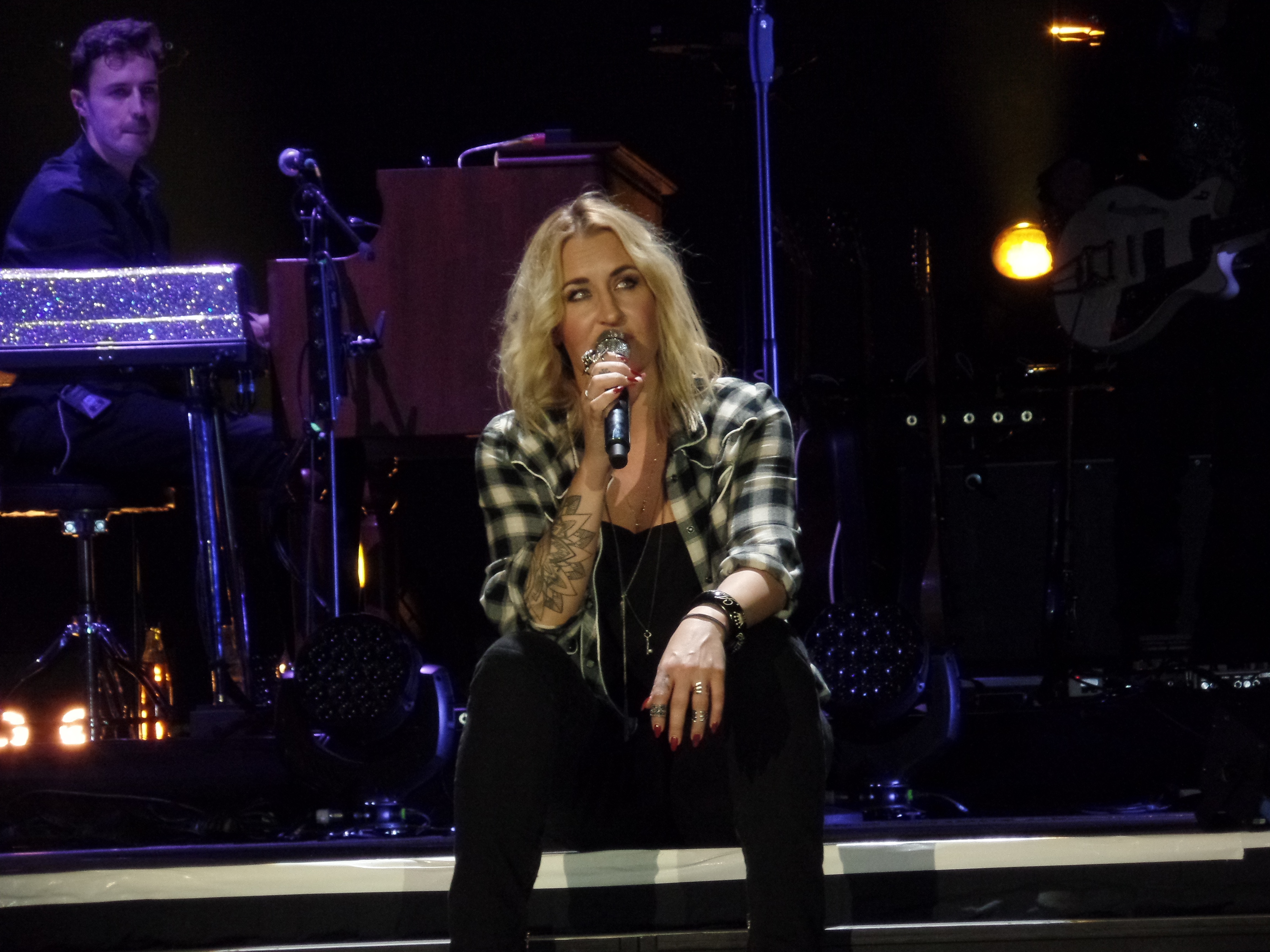
Connor performing at the Muttersprache Tour in March 2016

In 2009, Connor contributed to a re-recorded version of Enrique Iglesias' duet "Takin' Back My Love", replacing American singer Ciara's original vocals on the song. Released as the second single from Iglesias' 2008 Greatest Hits album in German-speaking Europe, Poland and the Czech Republic, it reached the top ten of the German singles chart. In April 2010, it was announced that Connor would appear alongside mentor George Glueck and musician Till Brönner as a judge on the debut series of X Factor, broadcast on the German VOX network. Connor was given the 16-24s category (made up of solo contestants between 16 and 24) but failed to reach the final show when her contestant Mati Gavriel was eliminated in his seventh week and Edita Abdieski was crowned the winner of X Factor instead. Amid her appearances on X Factor, Connor released her eighth studio album Real Love on 22 October 2010. It earned a lukewarm reception by critics, and debuted at number eight on the German albums chart. Altogether, Real Love produced two singles, including "Cold as Ice", which reached the top twenty on the German singles chart, and its title track, both of which became her lowest-charting singles in years. Connor returned for the second and third X Factor series in 2011 and 2012 and was given the groups and over 25s categories, respectively. Again, her contestants Nica & Joe and Björn Paulsen each placed third, losing to David Pfeffer and Mrs. Greenbird.

Following a hiatus, in 2014, Connor appeared in the reality television series Sing meinen Song – Das Tauschkonzert, the German version of The Best Singers series. In 2015, Connor released her ninth studio album Muttersprache, her first album to be entirely recorded in German. Encouraged to record songs in her native language, following her performances on Sing meinen Song, Connor worked with a smaller range of producers on the album, including Daniel Faust, Peter Plate, and Ulf Leo Sommer. Upon its release, Muttersprache debuted on top of on the German albums chart, becoming her second number-one album following 2005's Naughty but Nice. With first week sales of more than 100,000 copies in Germany, Muttersprache was certified gold by the Bundesverband Musikindustrie (BVMI) just days after its release. It has since been certified platinum. The album also debuted at number-one on the Swiss Albums Chart, her first album to do so. "Wie schön du bist" became Connor's highest-charting single in a decade, reaching number two on the German singles chart, and sold over 260,000 copies.

== Personal life ==
Connor met Marc Terenzi, the lead singer of American boy band Natural, at the Bravo Happy Holidays festival in Rust, Germany, in July 2002. The pair began dating, and in June 2003, it was announced they were engaged and expecting their first child, Tyler Marc Terenzi, who was born on 2 February 2004 in Orlando, Florida. The couple married the same month. They renewed their vows with a wedding ceremony in Spain in August 2005, which was the subject of their ProSieben reality show Sarah and Marc in Love. On 23 June 2006, Connor gave birth to their second child, a girl named Summer Antonia Soraya. In November 2008, Connor announced her separation from Terenzi, which resulted in their divorce in 2010.

In April 2010, Connor announced that she was in a relationship with her manager, Florian Fischer, the singer of the 1990s pop group The Boyz. In February 2011, the two confirmed that they were expecting a child. Their daughter Delphine Malou was born in September 2011. They married in 2013 and welcomed their son Jax Llewyn in January 2017.

== Discography ==
=== Studio albums ===
- Green Eyed Soul (2001)
- Unbelievable (2002)
- Key to My Soul (2003)
- Naughty but Nice (2005)
- Christmas in My Heart (2005)
- Soulicious (2007)
- Sexy as Hell (2008)
- Real Love (2010)
- Muttersprache (2015)
- Herz Kraft Werke (2019)
- Not So Silent Night (2022)
- Freigeistin (2025)

== Tours ==
- Green-eyed Soul Tour (2002)
- Sarah Connor Live (2003–2004)
- Naughty but Nice Tour (2005)
- Sexy as Hell Tour (2009)
- Sarah Connor China Tour (Beijing/Guangzhou) (2010–2012)
- Christmas in my Heart Live (2012–2013)
- Muttersprache Live (2015–2017)

== Television ==
Television guest appearances
Year	Title	Role	Notes
2005	Sarah & Marc in Love	Herself	Reality television
2008	Sarah & Marc Crazy in Love	Herself	Reality television, promo for Sexy as Hell
2009	Leo Piepmatz rockt das Haus: Eine Mut-Mach-Geschichte für kleine Löwen und große Rockstars	Herself	Audiobook
2010–2012	X-Factor	Herself	Main juror
2014	Sing meinen Song – Das Tauschkonzert	Herself	Television music show by VOX; Season 1
2014	Sing meinen Song – Das Tauschkonzert (Das Weihnachtskonzert)	Herself	Television music show by VOX; Season 1
2021	The Voice of Germany	Herself	Coach; season 11

== Awards ==
- 1Live Krone
  - 2005 – Best Female Artist
- BMI Pop Awards
  - 2005 – Pop Award ("Bounce") – WON
- Bravo Otto
  - 2001 – Female Singer – Silver
  - 2003 – Female Singer – Bronze
  - 2004 – Female Singer – GOLD
  - 2005 – Female Singer – GOLD
  - 2006 – Female Singer – GOLD
  - 2007 – Female Singer – Bronze
  - 2008 – Female Singer – GOLD
- Comet
  - 2001 – Best National Newcomer
  - 2005 – Best Female Artist
  - 2007 – Best Female Artist
  - 2009 – Best Female Artist
- DIVA-Award
  - 2005 – Music Artist of the Year
- ECHO (including nominations)
  - 2002 – Best National Newcomer (Green Eyed Soul) – nominated
  - 2002 – Best National Female Pop/Rock Artist (Green Eyed Soul) – WON
  - 2002 – Best National Single – From Sarah with Love – nominated
  - 2003 – Best National Female Pop/Rock Artist (Unbelievable) – nominated
  - 2004 – Best National Female Pop/Rock Artist (Key to My Soul) – nominated
  - 2006 – Best National Female Pop/Rock Artist (Naughty But Nice) – nominated
  - 2007 – Best National Female Pop/Rock Artist (Christmas in my Heart) – nominated
  - 2008 – Best National Female Pop/Rock Artist (Soulicious) – nominated
  - 2009 – Best National Female Pop/Rock Artist (Sexy as Hell) – nominated
  - 2011 – Best National Female Pop/Rock Artist (Real Love) – nominated
  - 2015 – Partner of the Year (Sing meinen Song) – WON
  - 2016 – Best National Female Pop/Rock Artist (Muttersprache) – nominated
  - 2016 – Album of the Year (Muttersprache) – nominated
- Goldene Europa
  - 2002 – Most Successful German Female Singer
- Goldene Kamera
  - 2005 – Pop National
- MAXIM
  - 2002 – Woman of the Year – Pop Star
- Neo Award
  - 2004 – Most Downloaded Album – Key to My Soul
- Radio Regenbogen Award
  - 2002 – Best Hit 2001 – From Sarah with Love
- Top of the Pops Award
  - 2001 Best German Newcomer
- World Music Award
  - 2004 – Best Selling German Artist
- World of Music Award
  - 2008 – Best National Female Artist
