= He's Unbelievable =

2003 single by Sarah Connor

Single by Sarah Connor

from the album Unbelievable
- B-side: "Please Take Him Back"
- Released: 24 March 2003
- Length: 4:20
- Label: X-Cell, Epic
- Songwriters: Rob Tyger, Kay Denar
- Producers: Kay D., Rob Tyger

Sarah Connor singles chronology
"Skin on Skin" (2002)	"He's Unbelievable" (2003)	"Bounce" (2003)

"He's Unbelievable" is a song by German singer-songwriter Sarah Connor from her second studio album, Unbelievable (2002). Written and produced by Rob Tyger and Kay Denar, it was released as the album's third single on 24 March 2003. The track contains elements of 2Pac's 1996 hit "California Love" featuring Dr. Dre.

== Track listings ==
German CD single

1. "He's Unbelievable" (Kayrob Video Mix) – 3:26
2. "Please Take Him Back" – 3:43

German CD maxi single

1. "He's Unbelievable" (Kayrob Video Mix) – 3:26
2. "He's Unbelievable" (Kayrob Radio Rmx) – 3:52
3. "He's Unbelievable" (UK Radio Edit) – 3:26
4. "Please Take Him Back" – 3:43
5. "He's Unbelievable" (Detroit Club Mix featuring Strawberry) – 4:04
6. "He's Unbelievable" (Ced Solo Club Remix featuring Strawberry) – 4:13
7. "He's Unbelievable" (Video - German Version) – 3:26

European CD single

1. "He's Unbelievable" (Radio Edit) – 3:26
2. "He's Unbelievable" (Album Rmx Version) – 3:54

European CD maxi single

1. "He's Unbelievable" (UK Radio Edit) – 3:26
2. "He's Unbelievable" (Kayrob Radio Rmx) – 3:52
3. "He's Unbelievable" (Album Version) – 4:20
4. "He's Unbelievable" (Detroit Club Mix) – 4:03
5. "He's Unbelievable" (Ced Solo Club Mix featuring Strawberry) – 4:13
6. "He's Unbelievable" (Ced Solo NYC Street Mix featuring Strawberry) – 4:02
7. "He's Unbelievable" (Video - UK Version) – 3:26

UK CD single

1. "He's Unbelievable" (Radio Edit) – 3:26
2. "He's Unbelievable" (Ced Solo Club Mix featuring Strawberry) – 4:13
3. "He's Unbelievable" (Ced Solo NYC Street Mix featuring Strawberry) – 4:02
4. "He's Unbelievable" (D-Bop Mix/Radio Edit) – 3:41
5. "He's Unbelievable" (Video - UK Version) – 3:26

UK cassette single

1. "He's Unbelievable" (UK Radio Edit)
2. "He's Unbelievable" (Ced Solo Club Remix featuring Strawberry)

Australian CD single

1. "He's Unbelievable" (Kayrob Radio Rmx) – 3:52
2. "He's Unbelievable" – 4:19
3. "He's Unbelievable" (Detroit Club Mix) – 4:03
4. "He's Unbelievable" (Ced Solo NYC Street featuring Strawberry the Preachers Daughter - Main Mix) – 4:00

== Charts ==
=== Weekly charts ===
Chart (2003–2004)	Peak position
Australia (ARIA)	77
Austria (Ö3 Austria Top 40)	36
Belgium (Ultratip Bubbling Under Flanders)	5
Belgium (Ultratip Bubbling Under Wallonia)	3
Europe (Eurochart Hot 100)	56
France (SNEP)	46
Germany (GfK)	16
Netherlands (Single Top 100)	49
Poland (Polish Airplay Chart)	18
Romania (Romanian Top 100)	6
Scotland Singles (Official Charts)	86
Switzerland (Schweizer Hitparade)	50
UK Singles (Official Charts)	86

=== Year-end charts ===
Chart (2003)	Position
Germany (Media Control GfK)	99
Romania (Romanian Top 100)	30

== Release history ==
Region	Date	Format(s)	Label(s)	Ref.
Europe	21 February 2003	Radio	X-Cell, Epic	
Germany	24 March 2003	CD	X-Cell, Epic	
United Kingdom	7 April 2003	CD; cassette	Epic	
Australia	24 September 2004	CD	Epic	
