= Music Is the Key =

2003 single by Sarah Connor

Single by Sarah Connor featuring Naturally 7

from the album Key to My Soul
- Released: 3 November 2003
- Length: 4:37
- Label: X-Cell
- Songwriters: Rob Tyger; Kay Denar
- Producers: Kay D.; Rob Tyger

Sarah Connor singles chronology
"Bounce" (2003)	"Music Is the Key" (2003)	"Just One Last Dance" (2004)

Naturally 7 singles chronology
"Music Is the Key" (2004)	"Feel It (In the Air Tonight)" (2007)

"Music Is the Key" is a song by German recording artist Sarah Connor and all-male American a cappella group Naturally 7. The song was written and produced by longtime collaborators Rob Tyger and Kay Denar and recorded for Connor's third studio album, Key to My Soul (2003). The track talks about the power of music, and eventually finding your own melody through listening.

"Music Is the Key" was positively reviewed by music critics, many of whom complimented its lyrical content and vocals. Selected as the lead single from Key to My Soul and released on 3 November 2003, it became an instant success, reaching number one on the German Singles Chart and peaking within the top five in Belgium and Switzerland.

== Music video ==
A music video for "Music Is the Key" was directed by Oliver Sommer and filmed in Orlando, Florida.

== Track listing ==
All tracks written and produced by Kay Denar and Rob Tyger.

2-track CD single
No.	Title	Length
1.	"Music Is the Key" (video version)	4:04
2.	"Music Is the Key" (album version)	4:37

CD maxi single
No.	Title	Length
1.	"Music Is the Key" (video version)	4:04
2.	"Music Is the Key" (album version)	4:37
3.	"Music Is the Key" (acappella version)	4:04
4.	"Music Is the Key" (video – director's cut)	4:37

== Charts ==
=== Weekly charts ===
Weekly chart performance for "Music Is the Key"
Chart (2003–2004)	Peak position
Austria (Ö3 Austria Top 40)	6
Belgium (Ultratip Bubbling Under Flanders)	3
Belgium (Ultratip Bubbling Under Wallonia)	11
CIS Airplay (TopHit)	94
Europe (Eurochart Hot 100)	5
Germany (GfK)	1
Russia Airplay (TopHit)	96
Switzerland (Schweizer Hitparade)	2
Ukraine Airplay (TopHit)	100

=== Year-end charts ===
2003 year-end chart performance for "Music Is the Key"
Chart (2003)	Position
Austria (Ö3 Austria Top 40)	68
Germany (Media Control GfK)	38
Switzerland (Schweizer Hitparade)	56

2004 year-end chart performance for "Music Is the Key"
Chart (2004)	Position
Austria (Ö3 Austria Top 40)	47
Germany (Media Control GfK)	56
Switzerland (Schweizer Hitparade)	40

== Certifications ==
Certifications for "Music Is the Key"
Region	Certification	Certified units/sales
Germany (BVMI)	Gold	150,000^{^}
^{^} Shipments figures based on certification alone.
