= Bounce (Sarah Connor song) =

2003 single by Sarah Connor

Single by Sarah Connor

from the album Unbelievable
- B-side: "Where Did U Sleep Last Nite?"
- Released: 21 July 2003
- Length: 4:12 (album version); 3:43 (US radio version)
- Label: X-Cell; Epic
- Songwriters: Bülent Aris; Toni Cottura; Anthony Freeman
- Producer: Bülent Aris

Sarah Connor singles chronology
"He's Unbelievable" (2003)	"Bounce" (2003)	"Music Is the Key" (2004)

"Bounce" is a song by German recording artist Sarah Connor, taken from her second studio album, Unbelievable (2002). Written by Bülent Aris, Toni Cottura, and Anthony Freeman, with production helmed by the former, the song samples Mary J. Blige's 2001 song "Family Affair", while featuring guest vocals by Wyclef Jean. "Bounce" was originally released as the album's fourth and final single in Central Europe on 21 July 2003, amid Connor's first pregnancy. It reached the top 20 in Austria, Germany, and Switzerland.

== Chart performance ==
"Bounce" was released by X-Cell Records on 21 July 2003 as the fourth and final single from Sarah Connor's second album debut album Unbelievable (2002). It initially debuted at number 16 on the German Singles Chart in the week of 4 August 2003, before rising to number twelve, its peak position, in the following week. The song would spend 12 weeks inside the top 100 of the chart. GfK ranked it 68th on its 2003 year-end singles chart. Elsewhere in German-speaking Europe, "Bounce" reached number 20 in Austria and number 14 in Switzerland, where it charted significantly higher than previous single "He's Unbelievable" (2003).

In the United States, radio programmers at 106.9 K-HITS in Tulsa, Oklahoma, received an import copy of the "Bounce"'s physical single and gave it airplay, which cued Epic Records to promote the song nationwide. The song subsequently reached number 11 on the US Billboard Mainstream Top 40 chart and number 54 on the Billboard Hot 100, scoring Connor her first and only US entry to date. "Bounce" was also released in Australia and the United Kingdom, where it reached number 14 in both countries. It was Connor's sole entry on the Australian music charts. It further reached number 23 on the Irish Singles Chart.

== Music video ==
A music video for "Bounce," featuring both Connor and Anthony Freeman, was directed by Daniel Lwowski and filmed in Berlin-Pankow in May 2003.

== Track listings ==
=== 2003 release ===
German maxi-CD single

1. "Bounce" (Kayrob radio mix) – 3:13
2. "Bounce" (Jiggy Joint radio remix) – 3:39
3. "Bounce" (original version) – 4:12
4. "Bounce" (Kayrob vs. Goldkind remix) – 3:44
5. "Bounce" (Jiggy Joint club remix) – 3:56
6. "Bounce" (video clip) – 3:12

German mini-CD single and European CD1

1. "Bounce" (Kayrob radio mix) – 3:13
2. "Bounce" (Jiggy Joint radio remix) – 3:39

European CD2

1. "Bounce" (French radio edit) – 3:44
2. "Bounce" (album version) – 4:12

=== 2004 release ===
European CD1

1. "Bounce" (US radio version) – 3:43
2. "Bounce" (Kayrob radio mix) – 3:13

European CD2

1. "Bounce" (US radio version) – 3:43
2. "Bounce" (Jiggy Joint club remix) – 3:56
3. "Bounce" (Kayrob radio mix) – 3:13
4. "Where Did U Sleep Last Nite?" (single edit) – 4:10
5. "Bounce" (video—US edit) – 3:11

UK CD single

1. "Bounce" (US radio version) – 3:43
2. "Bounce" (Cool & Dre urban remix) – 3:21

US and Canadian CD single

1. "Bounce" (radio version) – 3:43
2. "Where Did U Sleep Last Nite?" (single edit) – 4:10

Australian CD single

1. "Bounce" (Kayrob radio mix) – 3:13
2. "Bounce" (Jiggy Joint radio remix) – 3:39
3. "Bounce" – 4:11
4. "Bounce" (Kayrob vs. Goldkind Remix) – 3:44
5. "Bounce" (Jiggy Joint club remix) – 3:56

== Charts ==
=== Weekly charts ===
Weekly chart performance for "Bounce"
Chart (2003–2004)	Peak position
Australia (ARIA)	14
Austria (Ö3 Austria Top 40)	20
Belgium (Ultratop 50 Flanders)	33
Belgium (Ultratip Bubbling Under Wallonia)	16
Germany (GfK)	12
Hungary (Editors' Choice Top 40)	25
Ireland (IRMA)	23
Romania (Romanian Top 100)	19
Scotland Singles (Official Charts)	14
Switzerland (Schweizer Hitparade)	14
UK Singles (Official Charts)	14
US Billboard Hot 100	54
US Pop Airplay (Billboard)	11

=== Year-end charts ===
2003 year-end chart performance for "Bounce"
Chart (2003)	Position
Germany (Media Control GfK)	68

2004 year-end chart performance for "Bounce"
Chart (2004)	Position
Australia (ARIA)	84
US Mainstream Top 40 (Billboard)	69

== Certifications ==
Certifications for "Bounce"
Region	Certification	Certified units/sales
Australia (ARIA)	Gold	35,000^{^}
^{^} Shipments figures based on certification alone.

== Release history ==
Release dates and formats for "Bounce"
Region	Date	Format(s)	Label	Ref.
Germany	21 July 2003	CD; maxi-CD	X-Cell	
United States	19 January 2004	Rhythmic contemporary; contemporary hit radio	Epic	
Australia	23 April 2004	CD	Epic	
United States	4 May 2004	CD	Epic	
United Kingdom	24 May 2004	CD	Epic	
