= One Nite Stand (Of Wolves and Sheep) =

2002 single by Sarah Connor

Single by Sarah Connor featuring Wyclef Jean

from the album Unbelievable
- B-side: "1 + 1 = 2"
- Released: 2 September 2002
- Studio: Platinum Sound (New York City)
- Length: 3:58
- Label: X-Cell, Epic
- Songwriters: Wyclef Jean, Jerry Duplessis, O.G. Fortuna, Sarah Connor
- Producers: Wyclef Jean, Jerry "Wonder" Duplessis

Sarah Connor singles chronology
"If U Were My Man" (2001)	"One Nite Stand (Of Wolves and Sheep)" (2002)	"Skin on Skin" (2002)

Wyclef Jean singles chronology
"Two Wrongs" (2002)	"One Nite Stand (Of Wolves and Sheep)" (2002)	"Party to Damascus" (2003)

"One Nite Stand (Of Wolves and Sheep)" is a song by German singer–songwriter Sarah Connor featuring Haitian rapper Wyclef Jean. Written by Jean, Jerry Duplessis, O.G. Fortuna, and Connor, the song was released in German-speaking Europe on 2 September 2002 as the lead single from Connor's second studio album, Unbelievable (2002).

Connor debuted the song at the Popkomm 2002. It charted at number five on the German Singles Chart and reached the top 20 in Austria and Switzerland. "One Nite Stand (Of Wolves and Sheep)" was also planned for a UK release on 30 September 2002; however, the plans were eventually scrapped.

== Track listings ==
European CD single

1. "One Nite Stand (Of Wolves and Sheep)" (radio version) – 3:32
2. "One Nite Stand (Of Wolves and Sheep)" (video version) – 3:58

European maxi-CD single

1. "One Nite Stand (Of Wolves and Sheep)" (radio version) – 3:32
2. "One Nite Stand (Of Wolves and Sheep)" (video version) – 3:58
3. "One Nite Stand (Of Wolves and Sheep)" (Buddha Groove mix) – 4:05
4. "1 + 1 = 2" – 5:01

German 12-inch single

1. "One Nite Stand (Of Wolves and Sheep)" (club version with Shea's Club Keys)
2. "One Nite Stand (Of Wolves and Sheep)" (radio version)
3. "One Nite Stand (Of Wolves and Sheep)" (a capella version)

== Charts ==
=== Weekly charts ===
Chart (2002–2003)	Peak position
Austria (Ö3 Austria Top 40)	12
Belgium (Ultratop 50 Flanders)	45
Belgium (Ultratip Bubbling Under Wallonia)	2
Europe (Eurochart Hot 100)	24
Germany (GfK)	5
Hungary (Single Top 40)	10
Netherlands (Dutch Top 40)	25
Netherlands (Single Top 100)	20
New Zealand (Recorded Music NZ)	26
Sweden (Sverigetopplistan)	57
Switzerland (Schweizer Hitparade)	16

=== Year-end charts ===
Chart (2002)	Rank
Germany (Media Control)	84
