= Skin on Skin (Sarah Connor song) =

2002 single by Sarah Connor

Single by Sarah Connor

from the album Unbelievable
- Released: 4 November 2002
- Length: 4:44
- Label: X-Cell; Epic
- Songwriters: Kay Denar; Rob Tyger
- Producers: Kay D.; Rob Tyger

Sarah Connor singles chronology
"One Nite Stand (Of Wolves and Sheep)" (2002)	"Skin on Skin" (2002)	"He's Unbelievable" (2003)

"Skin on Skin" is a song by German singer Sarah Connor from her second studio album, Unbelievable (2002). Written and produced by Rob Tyger and Kay Denar, it was released by X-Cell Records as the album's second single on 4 November 2002 and reached the top 10 in Austria, the Czech Republic, Germany, and Portugal.

== Music video ==
A music video for "Skin on Skin " was directed by Daniel Lwowski and filmed on Mallorca in late September 2002.

== Track listings ==
German CD single

1. "Skin on Skin" (radio version) – 4:02
2. "Skin on Skin" (US college radio version) – 4:02

European CD single

1. "Skin on Skin" (radio version) – 4:02
2. "Skin on Skin" (Kayrob dance remix) – 4:03

European CD maxi-single

1. "Skin on Skin" (radio version) – 4:02
2. "Skin on Skin" (US college radio version) – 4:02
3. "Skin on Skin" (album version) – 4:44
4. "Skin on Skin" (Kayrob dance remix) – 4:03
5. "En Mi Piel" (Spanish radio version) – 4:02
6. "Skin on Skin" (video) – 4:02

== Charts ==
=== Weekly charts ===
Weekly chart performance for "Skin on Skin"
Chart (2002–2003)	Peak position
Austria (Ö3 Austria Top 40)	5
Belgium (Ultratop 50 Flanders)	24
Belgium (Ultratop 50 Wallonia)	24
Czech Republic (IFPI)	2
Europe (Eurochart Hot 100)	20
Germany (GfK)	5
Hungary (Rádiós Top 40)	37
Hungary (Single Top 40)	18
Netherlands (Dutch Top 40)	35
Netherlands (Single Top 100)	37
Portugal (AFP)	9
Romania (Romanian Top 100)	3
Switzerland (Schweizer Hitparade)	16

=== Year-end charts ===
Year-end chart performance for "Skin on Skin"
Chart (2003)	Position
Germany (Media Control GfK)	95
Romania (Romanian Top 100)	7
