= Unbelievable (Sarah Connor album) =

Studio album by Sarah Connor
- Released: September 30, 2002
- Length: 67:16
- Label: X-Cell
- Producer: Bülent Aris; Kay Denar; Jerry 'Wonder' Duplessis; Wyclef Jean; Sugar P.; Triage; Rob Tyger

Sarah Connor chronology
Green Eyed Soul (2001)	Unbelievable (2002)	Key to My; Soul (2003)

Singles from Unbelievable
- 1. "One Nite Stand (Of Wolves and Sheep)" Released: 2 September 2002; 2. "Skin on Skin" Released: 4 November 2002; 3. "He's Unbelievable" Released: 24 March 2003; 4. "Bounce" Released: 21 July 2003

Unbelievable is the second studio album by German recording artist Sarah Connor, released by X-Cell Records on September 30, 2002 in German-speaking Europe. Connor re-teamed with Rob Tyger and Kay Denar to work on the majority of the production of the album, consulting additional help from Wyclef Jean, Jerry Duplessis, Bülent Aris, Sugar P, and Triage.

While the album failed to link on the success of its predecessor Green Eyed Soul, it peaked at number 10 on the German Media Control albums chart, selling more than 250,000 copies domestically. Unbelievable also was released in a Spanish edition. Altogether the album spawned four singles: Jean-produced and featured "One Nite Stand (of Wolves and Sheep)", the ballad "Skin on Skin", "He's Unbelievable" (based on a sample of Tupac Shakur's "California Love"), and Connor's North American debut single "Bounce".

== Critical reception ==
Professional ratings
Review scores
Source	Rating
AllMusic	2.5/5 stars
laut.de	3/5 stars
MTV Asia	5/10

AllMusic editor Kingsley Marshall found that Unbelievable has Connor's "unarguably powerful voice soaring above the rock-solid production of sometime-Backstreet Boys desk man Bülent Aris. As is par for the course with the genre, ill-advised ballads handicap an album which didn't realistically require 17 tracks, but these slight indiscretions are unlikely to put off fans baying for a second album of Connor's slick pop."

== Track listing ==
Unbelievable track listing
No.	Title	Writer(s)	Producer(s)	Length
1.	"One Nite Stand (of Wolves and Sheep)" (featuring Wyclef Jean)	Wyclef Jean, Jerry Duplessis, Sarah Connor, O.G. Fortuna	W. Jean, J. Duplessis	3:58
2.	"He's Unbelievable"	Rob Tyger, Kay Denar	Rob Tyger, Kay D.	4:20
3.	"I Wanna Touch U There"	Diane Warren	Rob Tyger, Kay D.	3:25
4.	"The Loving Permission"	Tyger, Denar	Rob Tyger, Kay D.	4:50
5.	"Where Did You Sleep Last Nite?"	Tyger, Denar, Connor	Tyger, Kay D.	4:53
6.	"Bounce"	Bülent Aris, Toni Cottura, Anthony Freeman	Aris	4:14
7.	"Skin on Skin"	Tyger, Denar, Connor	Tyger, Kay D.	4:44
8.	"Wait 'Til You Hear from Me"	Tyger, Denar	Tyger, Kay D.	4:19
9.	"1 + 1 = 2"	Tyger, Denar	Tyger, Kay D.	5:02
10.	"Put Your Eyez on Me"	Tyger, Denar	Tyger, Kay D.	4:04
11.	"That's the Way I Am"	June Rollocks, Aris, T. Berlin, F. Dursthoff	Aris	3:34
12.	"Beautiful"	Rollocks, Aris, Dursthoff	Aris, Sugar P.	4:14
13.	"That Girl"	Tyger, Denar	Tyger, Kay D.	3:18
14.	"Sweet Thang"	Tyger, Denar	Tyger, Kay D.	4:04
15.	"Make My Day"	The Hitman, Mekong Age, Rufi-Oh	Triage	3:35
16.	"Teach U Tonite"	Tyger, Denar	Tyger, Kay D.	4:29
Total length:				67:16

German Limited Edition #1 bonus track
No.	Title	Producer(s)	Length
17.	"Better Half"	Triage	4:06
Total length:			72:05

German Limited Edition #2 bonus track
No.	Title	Producer(s)	Length
17.	"20,000 Feet"	Triage	3:58
Total length:			71:04

Special Edition bonus tracks
No.	Title	Writer(s)	Producer(s)	Length
17.	"One Nite Stand (Of Wolves And Sheep) (Club Version W/ Shea's Club Keys)"	W. Jean, J. Duplessis, S. Connor, O.G. Fortuna	W. Jean, J. Duplessis	4:09
18.	"Make My Day (Wicked Kid Urb'n Remix)"	The Hitman, Mekong Age, Rufi-Oh	Triage	3:52
Total length:				75:07

Spanish Edition
No.	Title	Writer(s)	Producer(s)	Length
13.	"Sweet Thang"	Tyger, Denar	Tyger, Kay D.	4:04
14.	"Teach U Tonite"	Tyger, Denar	Tyger, Kay D.	4:29
15.	"From Sarah With Love"	Tyger, Denar	Tyger, Kay D.	5:07
16.	"En Mi Piel"	Tyger, Denar, Victoria Castelo	Tyger, Kay D.	4:45
17.	"Quiero Encender Tu Piel"	Warren, Castelo	Tyger, Kay D.	3:25
18.	"De Sarah, Tu Amor"	Tyger, Denar, Castelo	Tyger, Kay D.	5:07
Total length:				78:41

== Charts ==
Chart performance for Unbelievable
Chart (2002)	Peak position
Austrian Albums (Ö3 Austria)	21
Finnish Albums (Suomen virallinen lista)	21
German Albums (Offizielle Top 100)	10
Swiss Albums (Schweizer Hitparade)	19

== Certifications ==
Certifications for Unbelievable
Region	Certification	Certified units/sales
Germany (BVMI)	Gold	150,000^{^}
Switzerland (IFPI Switzerland)	Platinum	40,000^{^}
^{^} Shipments figures based on certification alone.
