= List of number-one singles of 2012 (Poland) =

This is a list of the songs that reached number-one position in official Polish single chart in ZPAV in 2012.

== Chart history ==
Issue Date	Song	Artist(s)	Reference(s)
January 7	"Someone like You"	Adele	
January 14	"We Found Love"	Rihanna featuring Calvin Harris	
January 21	"Somebody That I Used to Know"	Gotye featuring Kimbra	
January 28	"Somebody That I Used to Know"	Gotye featuring Kimbra	
February 4	"Somebody That I Used to Know"	Gotye featuring Kimbra	
February 11	"Ai se eu te pego!"	Michel Teló	
February 18	"Somebody That I Used to Know"	Gotye featuring Kimbra	
February 25	"Somebody That I Used to Know"	Gotye featuring Kimbra	
March 3	"Somebody That I Used to Know"	Gotye featuring Kimbra	
March 10	"Somebody That I Used to Know"	Gotye featuring Kimbra	
March 17	"Somebody That I Used to Know"	Gotye featuring Kimbra	
March 24	"Somebody That I Used to Know"	Gotye featuring Kimbra	
March 31	"Stronger (What Doesn't Kill You)"	Kelly Clarkson	
April 7	"Lullaby"	Nickelback	
April 14	"Za każdym razem"	Jula	
April 21	"Za każdym razem"	Jula	
April 28	"We Are Young"	Fun. featuring Janelle Monáe	
May 5	"Lullaby"	Nickelback	
May 12	"Lullaby"	Nickelback	
May 19	"Friends"	Aura Dione featuring Rock Mafia	
May 26	"Friends"	Aura Dione featuring Rock Mafia	
June 2	"Endless Summer"	Oceana	
June 9	"Endless Summer"	Oceana	
June 16	"Endless Summer"	Oceana	
June 23	"Call Me Maybe"	Carly Rae Jepsen	
June 30	"Call Me Maybe"	Carly Rae Jepsen	
July 7	"Whistle"	Flo Rida	
July 14	"Whistle"	Flo Rida	
July 21	"Back in Time"	Pitbull	
July 28	"Back in Time"	Pitbull	
August 4	"Prawdziwe powietrze"	Loka	
August 11	"Nie zatrzymasz mnie"	Jula	
August 18	"Addicted to You"	Shakira	
August 25	"Nie zatrzymasz mnie"	Jula	
September 1	"Nie zatrzymasz mnie"	Jula	
September 8	"Euphoria"	Loreen	
September 15	"Euphoria"	Loreen	
September 22	"Nieodporny rozum"	Ewelina Lisowska	
September 29	"Nieodporny rozum"	Ewelina Lisowska	
October 6	"Lights"	Ellie Goulding	
October 13	"Burn It Down"	Linkin Park	
October 20	"Nieodporny rozum"	Ewelina Lisowska	
October 27	"Nieodporny rozum"	Ewelina Lisowska	
November 3	"I Follow Rivers"	Lykke Li	
November 10	"I Follow Rivers"	Lykke Li	
November 17	"I Follow Rivers"	Lykke Li	
November 24	"I Follow Rivers"	Lykke Li	
December 1	"Summertime Sadness"	Lana Del Rey	
December 8	"One Day / Reckoning Song (Wankelmut Rmx)"	Asaf Avidan	
December 15	"Summertime Sadness"	Lana Del Rey	
December 22	"I Follow Rivers"	Lykke Li	
December 29	"Summertime Sadness"	Lana Del Rey	

== Number-one artists ==
Position	Artist	Weeks at #1		
1	Gotye	9		
1	Kimbra (as featuring)	9		
2	Jula	5		
2	Lykke Li	5		
3	Ewelina Lisowska	4		
4	Nickelback	3		
4	Oceana	3		
4	Lana Del Rey	3		
4	5	3	Aura Dione	2
Pitbull	5			2
Rock Mafia (as featuring)	5			2
Carly Rae Jepsen	5			2
Flo Rida	5			2
Loreen
1	Adele	1		
1	Rihanna	1		
1	Calvin Harris (as featuring)	1		
1	Michel Teló	1		
1	Kelly Clarkson	1		
1	Fun.	1		
1	Janelle Monáe (as featuring)	1		
1	Loka	1		
1	Shakira	1		
1	Ellie Goulding	1		
1	Linkin Park	1		
1	Asaf Avidan	1		

== See also ==
- Polish Music Charts
- List of number-one albums of 2012 (Poland)
