= Song for Sophie (I Hope She Flies) =

Single by Aura Dione

from the album Columbine
- B-side: "Clean Hands"
- Released: 27 April 2010
- Recorded: Delta Lab Studios, Copenhagen, Denmark
- Genre: Pop
- Length: 3:18
- Label: Island
- Songwriter: Aura Dione
- Producers: Kenneth Bager, Thomas Troelsen

Aura Dione singles chronology
"I Will Love You Monday (365)" (2009)	"Song for Sophie (I Hope She Flies)" (2010)	"Something from Nothing" (2010)

"Song for Sophie (I Hope She Flies)" is a song by Danish singer-songwriter Aura Dione from her debut album Columbine. It was released as Dione's second single in 2007 in Denmark, following "Something from Nothing". In Germany, Austria and Switzerland, it was released on 27 April 2010 by Island Records as Dione's second single.

The song peaked at number twelve in Germany and at number eighteen in Austria. It also charted within Billboard's European Hot 100 Singles chart at number 49.

== Track listings ==
German digital download
No.	Title	Length
1.	"Song for Sophie (I Hope She Flies)"	3:18
2.	"Clean Hands"	3:49
3.	"Song for Sophie (I Hope She Flies)" (Wippenberg Remix)	8:24
4.	"Song for Sophie (I Hope She Flies)" (Jean Claude Ades Radio Edit)	3:03
5.	"Song for Sophie (I Hope She Flies)" (Acoustic Version)	3:19

German CD single
No.	Title	Length
1.	"Song for Sophie (I Hope She Flies)"	3:18
2.	"Clean Hands"	3:49

== Chart performance ==
=== Charts ===
Chart (2008)	Peak position
Denmark (Tracklisten)	16
Chart (2010)	Peak position
Austria (Ö3 Austria Top 40)	18
European Hot 100 Singles (Billboard)	49
Germany (GfK)	12
Slovakia Airplay (ČNS IFPI)	83
Switzerland (Schweizer Hitparade)	68

=== Year-end charts ===
Chart (2010)	Position
Germany (Media Control AG)	84
