= Thomas Troelsen =

Danish singer, songwriter, and producer

- Born: Thomas Troelsen
- Origin: Skive, Denmark
- Genres: Pop; Rock; Pop rock Dance; Dance-pop
- Occupations: Singer, songwriter, record producer
- Instruments: Vocals, sampler, keyboards, synthesizer, vocoder, guitar, bass guitar
- Years active: 1996–present
- Labels: Universal Music, EMI Music Publishing

Thomas Troelsen is a Danish singer, songwriter, and producer from Skive. Troelsen has written and produced songs for Pitbull, Flo Rida, Justin Bieber, David Guetta, Lil Wayne, Drengene fra Angora, Nile Rodgers, Jason Derulo, Charlie Puth, Chris Brown, Afrojack, Akon, Meghan Trainor, Girls' Generation, SHINee, EXO, NCT Dream and Junior Senior.

In 2018, Troelsen co-wrote "Say My Name" by David Guetta featuring J Balvin and Bebe Rexha. He also co-wrote, co-produced and is a featured vocalist on the Lil Wayne song "Can't Be Broken" from the platinum album Tha Carter V.

In 2016, Troelsen co-wrote "I Love Me" by Meghan Trainor and This One's For You by David Guetta featuring Zara Larsson, the UEFA 2016 official song.

In 2015, Troelsen co-wrote the song "Company" by Justin Bieber from his album Purpose. He also wrote 3 songs for Flo Rida, including the single "I Don't Like It, I Love It" featuring Robin Thicke, and the single "Heatwave" for Robin Schulz featuring Akon.

In 2014, Troelsen co-wrote and co-produced "We Are One (Ole Ola)", the Official 2014 FIFA World Cup Song, featuring Pitbull and Jennifer Lopez.

== History ==
As a writer and producer, Troelsen's work has charted globally, with hits such as Lil Wayne's "Can't Be Broken" (#1 Billboard 200), Junior Senior's "Move Your Feet" (#2 UK), "I Don't Like It, I Love It" by Flo Rida feat. Robin Thicke (#7 UK), Aura Dione's "Geronimo" (#1 Germany), Monrose's "Hot Summer" (#1 Germany), and Private's "My Secret Lover" (#1 Denmark).

In 2014, Troelsen co-wrote and co-produced "We Are One (Ole Ola)," the Official 2014 FIFA World Cup Song, featuring Pitbull, Jennifer Lopez, and Claudia Leitte. The song was performed by Pitbull and Jennifer Lopez at the Opening Ceremony of the 2014 World Cup and was included on the "Official 2014 FIFA World Cup Album," released by Sony.

In Asia, Troelsen is regarded as one of the most successful and prolific writers and producers of K-Pop. Troelsen's compositions have sold over 10 million units in Korean and Japan to date. Troelsen wrote TVXQ's single "Mirotic", whose eponymous album was the best-selling album of 2008 in South Korea. Other major K-Pop songs written and produced by Troelsen include SHINee's "Love Like Oxygen", EXO's "History," and TVXQ's "Humanoids."

Troelsen also fronts the pop group Private, whose single "My Secret Lover" was remixed by Diplo and Egyptian Lover and was featured as Record of the Week on Scott Mills and Nick Grimshaw's shows on BBC Radio 1. The song was also featured in a Prada commercial in 2010.

Troelsen owns a recording studio, Delta Lab Studios, in Copenhagen, Denmark, whose design was inspired by Verner Panton and has a vast collection of analog equipment.

Troelsen has been profiled in publications such as Dazed & Confused, NME, and Monocle.

Since July 2011, Troelsen is signed to EMI Music Publishing.

== Music in film, television and video games ==
Thomas Troelsen's compositions have appeared in the following:

- Gossip Girl ("Last Dance" and "Suicide")
- EA's FIFA 10 ("The Sound of Swing")
- Fuel TV ("Suicide")
- Lifetime's "Seven Deadly Sins" ("Bang!")
- 90210 ("Hot Summer")
- EA's Boogie Superstar ("Hot Summer")
- Clicknet ("Fragment Eight")
- Poppy Shakespeare ("Fragment One," "The Sound of Swing" and "The First Picture")
- Dong Energy ("The Sound of Swing")
- Renault ("The Sound of Swing")
- Rock Band 3 ("Last Dance")
- Patagonia ("On the Floor")
- Google Chromebook ("Move Your Feet")
- White Chicks ("Move Your Feet")

Thomas has also written jingles for Gametap, Dong Energy, Lalandia, and DK TV.

== Discography ==
=== Select writing credits & productions ===
- 2002: Move Your Feet by Junior Senior (single) -- featured vocals (chorus), production
- 2004: Baby by Melody Club (song/single)
- 2004: "We Love to Boogie", "I'm on Fire", "No.1", "Bombs", "On the Moon" by Remee
- 2004: "Jul I Angora", "De Skal Ha' Baghjul Nede I Touren", "Ridder-Problemer", "Tennisbolden" from Drengene fra Angora
- 2006: "Fragment 1 (and I Kept Hearing)", "Fragment 2 (the First Picture) feat. Julee Cruise, "Fragment 8 (The Sound of Swing)" by Kenneth Bager from Fragments from a Space Cadet
- 2006: Back in Town, Bold as Love, It should be me, It should be you by Whyte Seeds
- 2007: Hot Summer by Monrose (single)
- 2007: Strictly Physical by Monrose (album)
- 2007: Was Ist Los by Sistanova
- 2007: The Way That You Love Me (Contigo Pierdo El Control) by Morgana feat. Domino Saints
- 2007: Hold Nu Kay by JaConfetti from The Rainbow Express
- 2008: Song for Sophie and Something from Nothing by Aura Dione from Columbine
- 2008: Disappear by No Angels
- 2008: Forever or Never (Single),Dysfunctional Family, and How Does it Feel by Cinema Bizarre
- 2008: Sexy as Hell by Sarah Connor (singer) (album, five tracks)
- 2008: Under My Skin by Sarah Connor (single)
- 2008: Show The World, Magic Lover, Report to the Dancefloor, Mission Impossible, Rock the Party, Girls, Girls, Girls, The Secret by Martin
- 2008: Mirotic by TVXQ (single)
- 2008: Eat You Up by BoA (single)
- 2008: SHINee World by SHINee
- 2008: "Dead or Alive" from Electric Cabaret by Infernal
- 2009: In and Out of Control by The Raveonettes (album)
- 2009: Material Boy (Don't Look Back) by Jeanette from Undress to the Beat
- 2009: Back to the 80's by Aqua
- 2009: Oxygen by Alien Beat Club from "Diversity"
- 2009: "Hot Winter" by Jolin Tsai from "Butterfly"
- 2010: "My Secret Lover" by PRIVATE
- 2010: Run Devil Run by Girls' Generation (single)
- 2010: Echo by Girls' Generation from Oh!
- 2010: Hurricane Venus by BoA (album, two songs)
- 2010: Nu ABO by f(x) (album, two tracks)
- 2010: "Saturday" by Basshunter (single)
- 2010: "Plastic Fantastic", "Gunshot", "The Weekend and I" by Infernal from Fall from Grace
- 2010: Sonrisa by Ana Torroja
- 2010: "The Sound of Swing, Pt. 2 (Oh Na Na) feat. Aloe Blacc, "Fragment 13 (Go Underground)", "Fragment 16 (I Can't Wait)" by Kenneth Bager from "Fragments from a Space Cadet 2"
- 2011: Showtime by TV-2 (album)
- 2011: "Mirror Mirror" by Sash! (album)
- 2011: "Gigolo" and "Army of Love" by Anders-Fahrenkrog
- 2011: "Hot Summer" by f(x) (single)
- 2011: Pinocchio by f(x) (album, two songs, "Gangsta Boy" and "Hot Summer")
- 2011: Perfection by Super Junior-M (EP, one track, "Perfection")
- 2011: Mr. Simple by Super Junior (Album, two tracks, "Opera" and "Perfection")
- 2011: "Geronimo" from Before the Dinosaurs by Aura Dione
- 2011: "Pistolskud" by Infernal from Toppen af Poppen
- 2011: How R U Doin? by Aqua
- 2011: "You Could Be the One" by Bream & Blinders
- 2012: "Everywhere" by PRIVATE feat. O.T. Genasis
- 2012: "History" by EXO (single)
- 2011: "Lazy Girl" by Girls' Generation
- 2012: "Criminal" by Vox Halo feat La Dolla
- 2012: "Single Ladies" and "Hollywood Ending" by Remady & Manu-L feat. J-Son (single)
- 2012: "Spy" by Super Junior
- 2012: "Outsider" by Super Junior
- 2012: "Sherlock", "Clue" and "Note" by Shinee
- 2012: "Humanoids" by TVXQ!
- 2012: "Señorita" by Abraham Mateo
- 2012: "Tonight" by Alexandra Burke from Heartbreak on Hold
- 2012: "Out the Water" by Fabio Lendrum from Alpha
- 2012: "Hate That I Love You" by Kristoffer Rahbek
- 2013: "Why Not" by 2YOON from Harvest Moon
- 2013: "Spoiler" by Shinee from Chapter 1. Dream Girl – The Misconceptions of You
- 2013: "Girls, Girls, Girls" by Shinee from Chapter 1. Dream Girl – The Misconceptions of You
- 2013: "Punch Drunk Love" by Shinee from Chapter 1. Dream Girl – The Misconceptions of You
- 2013: "Like a Fire" by Shinee from Chapter 2. Why So Serious? – The Misconceptions of Me
- 2013: "More Than Friends", "Tonight", "World of Love" by Inna from Party Never Ends
- 2013: "Marabou" by Antonia
- 2013: "Get You Back" by Wally Lopez feat. Ricki-Lee
- 2013: "Waiting for the End" by Marco V
- 2013: "Everybody" by Shinee
- 2013: "Fridays Are Forever" by The Fooo
- 2013: "What's Your Name Girl?" by Jealous Much? feat. The Airplane Boys
- 2013: "Why Not" by 2YOON from "Harvest Moon"
- 2014: "We Are One (Ole, Ola)" by Pitbull feat. Jennifer Lopez and Claudia Leitte
- 2014: "Good Time" by Inna feat. Pitbull from LatINNA
- 2014: "Butterfly" by f(x) from Red Light
- 2014: "Danger" by TAEMIN (Shinee) from ACE
- 2014: "Body And The Sun" by Inna from Summer Days
- 2014: "Kiss You" by Sasha Lopez
- 2014: "Who I Am" by Abraham Mateo from Who I AM
- 2014: "Save The Night" by Dirty Dasmo
- 2014: "Happy People" by Robots Don't Sleep
- 2014: "The Way That You Love Me" by Morgana
- 2014: "Remember to Forget" by Carlprit feat. Jaicko
- 2015: "I Don't Like It, I Love It" by Flo Rida feat. Robin Thicke and Verdine White
- 2015: "Here it Is" by Flo Rida feat. Chris Brown
- 2015: "That's What I Like" by Flo Rida feat. Fitz
- 2015: "Need Somebody" by M. Pokora from R.E.D.
- 2015: "God Invented Fridays" by DJ Luis López
- 2015: "Back in the Old School" by Chic feat. Nile Rodgers
- 2015: "We Wanna" by Alexandra Stan & Inna feat. Daddy Yankee
- 2015: "Chemicals" by Tiësto & Don Diablo feat. Thomas Troelsen
- 2015: "Heatwave" by Robin Schulz feat. Akon from Sugar
- 2015: "Day Trippin'" by Kaskade feat. Estelle from Automatic
- 2015: INNA by Inna (5 tracks, Bop Bop, "Walking On the Sun", "Rendez Vous", "Body and The Sun", "Sun Goes Up")
- 2015: "Company" by Justin Bieber from Purpose
- 2015: "Dirty Mind" by Flo Rida
- 2015: "Fired Cuz I Was Late" by AronChupa
- 2016: "Up All Night" by Charlie Puth from Nine Track Mind
- 2016: "Hello Friday" by Flo Rida feat. Jason Derulo
- 2016: "I Love Me" by Meghan Trainor feat. LunchMoney Lewis
- 2016: "This One's For You by David Guetta feat. Zara Larsson
- 2016: "Who Did You Love" by Flo Rida feat. Arianna
- 2016: "Kiss The Sky" by Jason Derulo
- 2016: "Debut" by Maria Hazell
- 2016: "Karma" by Julian Perretta
- 2016: "Chewing Gum" by NCT Dream
- 2017: "I Got Love" by Taeyeon
- 2017: "Yes" by Sam Feldt featuring Akon
- 2017: "Private Dancer" by Julian Perretta and Feder
- 2017: "Nirvana", "In My Dreams" by Inna from Nirvana
- 2018: "Found You" by Don Diablo featuring Bullysongs from Future
- 2018: "Bed of Roses" by Afrojack featuring Stanaj
- 2018: "Jennie" by Felix Jaehn featuring R. City
- 2018: “Who’s Up” by LunchMoney Lewis
- 2018: "Do You Wanna Party?" by Nile Rodgers & Chic featuring LunchMoney Lewis
- 2018: "Say My Name" by David Guetta featuring J Balvin and Bebe Rexha from 7
- 2018: "Diamond Heart" by Alan Walker featuring Sophia Somajo from Different World
- 2018: "Can't Be Broken" by Lil Wayne from Tha Carter V
- 2018: "Lost Control" by Alan Walker from Different World
- 2018: "Truth" by TVXQ from New Chapter #2: The Truth of Love
- 2018: "Alabama" by Almeda feat. Burak Yeter
- 2019: "Leyla" by Mesto
- 2019: "Sober" by Afrojack featuring Rae Sremmurd & Stanaj
- 2019: "BITCH (takes one to know one)" by Lennon Stella
- 2019: "Show Me" by Key
- 2019: "Girls Gotta Live" by FAKY
- 2019: "Last Man in the World" by Aura Dione
- 2019: "Follow" by Yunho from True Colors
- 2019: "I Can't Stand the Rain" by Super M
- 2020: "Chocolate" by Changmin from Chocolate
- 2020: "Piano" by Changmin from Chocolate
- 2020: "All Day" by Asher Angel
- 2020: "Go to God", "Toilet Paper", "Quarantine Blues", "Thank You" by LunchMoney Lewis from Songs in the Key of Quarantine
- 2020 "Inside Out" by Steve Aoki with Felix Jaehn feat. Jamie Scott from Neon Future IV
- 2020 "Looking to Love" by Nick Talos feat. Chelcee Grimes
- 2020 "Numbers" by JAMIE Park Ji-min feat. JMIN
- 2021 "Time Machine" and "Loco" by U-Know Yunho
- 2021 "No Numbers" by JAMIE Park Ji-min feat. Changmo
- 2021 "...Dummy" by Cheat Codes feat. Oli Sykes from Hellraisers, Part 2
- 2021 "Don't Stop" by LunchMoney Lewis feat. Trinidad James
- 2022 "Stay With You" by Afrojack, Dubvision, Manse
- 2022 "Bullet" by Benjamin Ingrosso from PLAYLIST
- 2022 "The One" by Nghtmre and Klaxx
- 2022 "Seasick" by Dragonette
- 2022 "Go Up" by Jay B
