= Whistle (While You Work It) =

Single by Katy Tiz
- Released: February 10, 2015
- Genre: Pop
- Length: 3:35
- Label: Atlantic
- Songwriters: Katy Tiz; Kinetics & One Love; Emily Warren; Jorge Menezes
- Producer: J.R. Rotem

Katy Tiz singles chronology
"The Big Bang" (2014)	"Whistle (While You Work It)" (2015)	"Samurai" (2016)

Music video
- "Whistle (While You Work It)" on YouTube

"Whistle (While You Work It)" is a song by British singer-songwriter Katy Tiz. It was written by Tiz, Kinetics & One Love, and songwriter Emily Warren for Tiz's debut studio album. It was released onto iTunes on 10 February 2015.

A Simlish (the language in most of The Sims games) version of the song was recorded and included in an expansion pack for The Sims 4, titled The Sims 4: Get to Work.

== Background ==
Tiz said in an interview that she wrote the song about a darker period in her life where she felt like nothing was going her way, but her brother was there to tell her to chin up, keep moving, and never give up. It was cowritten with Kinetics & One Love, songwriter Emily Warren and was produced by J.R. Rotem and co-produced by Teal Douville.

Tiz said about the song in an interview: "You may think this song is about going to the club and 'working it' but if you pay close attention to the lyrics, you'll see it's much deeper than that."

== Music video ==
A music video for "Whistle (While You Work It)" was filmed and released by Syndrome Studio and director James Larese, and was uploaded onto Tiz's official YouTube channel on 16 April 2015.

The video combines live action with animation elements and shows Tiz interacting with a crew of animated animal friends and enjoying several activities with them such as getting their nails done, and trying out clothing.

Idolator gave the video a positive review: "Katy springs to life from street art. From there, the blond bombshell indulges in a little choreography with her girls, goes for a stroll with a crew of cartoon characters and gets her nails done. It deftly combines the live action and animation elements, and is guaranteed to put a smile on your face."

== Charts ==
Chart (2015)	Peak position
Australia Hitseekers (ARIA)	1
New Zealand (Recorded Music NZ)	14
New Zealand Digital Songs (Billboard)	6
Poland (Polish Airplay New)	1
US Adult Pop Airplay (Billboard)	26
US Bubbling Under Hot 100 (Billboard)	20
US Pop Digital Songs (Billboard)	24

== Certifications ==
Region	Certification	Certified units/sales
New Zealand (RMNZ)	Platinum	30,000^{‡}
^{‡} Sales+streaming figures based on certification alone.
