= The Heart Wants What It Wants =

2014 single by Selena Gomez

Single by Selena Gomez

from the album For You
- Released: November 6, 2014
- Recorded: 2013
- Studio: Rock Mafia Studios (Santa Monica, CA)
- Genre: Pop; R&B; electropop
- Length: 3:47
- Label: Hollywood
- Songwriters: Selena Gomez; Antonina Armato; David Jost; Tim James
- Producer: Rock Mafia

Selena Gomez singles chronology
| "Slow Down" (2013) | "The Heart Wants What It Wants" (2014) | "I Want You to Know" (2015) |

Music video
- "The Heart Wants What It Wants" on YouTube

"The Heart Wants What It Wants" is a song by American singer Selena Gomez. It was released on November 6, 2014, through Hollywood Records, as the lead and only single from her compilation album For You (2014). The song was written by Gomez, Antonina Armato, David Jost and Tim James. Armato and James, who collectively form the production duo Rock Mafia, also produced the song. A mid-tempo pop and R&B track with a minimal electropop beat, its accompanying music video was premiered on November 6, 2014, alongside the premiere of the song itself. It is Gomez's last single release under the label.

Music critics mostly commended the song's lyrical content, production, vocals, and Gomez's new direction. The song reached number six on the Billboard Hot 100. It also reached the top ten in Canada, Denmark, Lebanon, and South Africa, as well as the top 40 in thirteen additional countries. It is certified Quadruple Platinum in the US and Norway and Silver or higher in six additional countries.

== Background and release ==
Gomez said about the song, "And it's also a step for me knowing like, 'Ok, this is what I'm about to say, and I need to say it when I'm ready' [...] And I think after this year, it's the perfect way to end the year, it's the perfect way to end a chapter in a way. It's like, this is what I'll say about every single person that has judged me for every decision that I've made, for every person, [and] heart that is being judged for something they've done, and now I just want to release it," Gomez stated in an interview with Ryan Seacrest on 102.7 KIIS FM during the world premiere of "The Heart Wants What It Wants." In its first day on radio, the song had a listening audience of 10.061 million.

A demo of the song was recorded by American singer Gwen Stefani under the title "My Heart Wants What It Wants", which leaked online in December 2022.

== Composition and lyrical interpretation ==
"The Heart Wants What It Wants"
A 23-second sample of "The Heart Wants What It Wants" by Selena Gomez, where the chorus is heard.

"The Heart Wants What It Wants" was written by Selena Gomez, Antonina Armato, David Jost, and Tim James. It is a midtempo pop and R&B song, that contains a minimal electropop beat complete with finger snaps, ominous synths and haunting groans. Several critics noted the reminiscence of the song to the works by singers Lorde and Lana Del Rey. Lyrically, Gomez details being in love with a bad boy despite knowing he may not be a stand-up guy. She sings, "The bed's getting cold and you're not here / The future that we hold is so unclear / But I'm not alive until you call / And I'll bet the odds against it all... / There's a million reasons why I should give you up / But the heart wants what it wants."

The title is from a letter by Emily Dickinson. The saying was popularized in 1992 when it was quoted by Woody Allen in an interview about his relationship with Soon-Yi Previn.

According to the sheet music published at Musicnotes.com, "The Heart Wants What It Wants" is written in the key of G Minor with a tempo of 80-84 beats per minute. It follows a chord progression of Eb-Cm-Gm-Bb.

== Critical reception ==
Lucas Villa of AXS favorably compared "The Heart Wants What it Wants" to the music of Lana Del Rey for Gomez's use of "trip hop beats, guitar and distorted Emile Haynie-styled yelps" alongside her "darkest" lyrics yet. He further wrote that the song "stands as a heartbreaking revelation in her five-year-old songbook, one that's vulnerably beautiful and unapologetically honest." Tim Sendra of AllMusic highlighted the song and praised it by calling it "very adult and real-sounding" and adding that "she acquits herself well here too." Popology Now called this song "emotionally charged." The Huffington Post's Christopher Rosen deemed the song "a fairly good anthem for those going through heartbreak."

Idolator praised the song: "The Rock Mafia-produced gem shows the former teen queen in an entirely new light. There’s a vulnerability we haven’t seen before as Selena sings about the dark side of her very own fairytale with palpable honesty and conviction" and the editor called it the selling point of an album and added that if Selena follows this direction, many hits will be coming for her." The Times of India editor Kasmin Fernandes added that this song shows her in an "entirely new light." Renowned for Sound was also positive: "smooth dose of pop with a second-guessing love storyline." When reviewing single, Music Times concluded: "Emotional song channels Justin Bieber drama but is still stunning on its own."

=== Accolades ===
| Year | Awards | Category | Result | Ref. |
|---|---|---|---|---|
| 2015 | Radio Disney Music Awards | Best Breakup Song | Won | |
| 2015 | Teen Choice Awards | Choice Music – Break-Up Song | Nominated | |

== Chart performance ==
During its first week, "The Heart Wants What It Wants" sold 103,000 digital copies in the United States, which allowed it to debut at number six of Billboard's Digital Songs. These sales gave Gomez her second best debut on the list, after "Who Says" with her band Selena Gomez & the Scene, which debuted with 116,000 copies. On the Billboard Hot 100 chart, which combines digital sales with radio and streaming performance, the song debuted at number twenty-five; the best entry of the week. On Billboard's Streaming Songs, it debuted at number thirty-seven for receiving 3.1 million streams in a week. After performing the song at the American Music Awards on November 23, 2014, Gomez received her second top 10 on the Billboard Hot 100, and it reached number six, the same position obtained by "Come & Get It" in May 2013. The week after its release, the song sold 136,000 copies and reached number five on Digital Songs, since it had a 98% increase in downloads compared to the previous week. Simultaneously, it reached the fifth position in Streaming Songs and debuted at number forty-two on Radio Songs. In the latter, the song became Gomez's second top ten, again behind "Come & Get It". In the Pop Songs chart, based on the level of airplay that songs receive on pop radio stations in the United States, "The Heart Wants What It Wants" became Gomez's third top 10 single in her solo career and her third consecutive single making it to the first ten spots on the chart. In late January 2015, the song debuted on the Hot Dance Club Songs chart, marking the most popular songs in the dance clubs of the United States. As of May 2017, the single has sold 1.4 million copies in the United States.

In the Canadian Hot 100, it also achieved the best debut in its first week, at number nine. This made "The Heart Wants What It Wants" Gomez's third top 10 in the country and her second best charting single after "Come & Get It", which peaked at number six, followed by "Love You like a Love Song", which reached the tenth position. Weeks later "The Heart Wants What It Wants" equaled the position of "Come & Get It" in the Canadian Hot 100 chart.

The song experienced success in Europe, reaching top ten such as Denmark, Slovakia, Greece and Czech Republic, top twenty in Hungary, Norway and Finland, top thirty in United Kingdom, Spain, Belgium and France and top forty in Romania. The song appeared on the Austrian, German, Swedish, Dutch, Russian and Italian Singles Chart, although it failed to enter into the top forty.

== Music video ==
The music video was filmed in black and white in California and directed by Dawn Shadforth over a year before its release. The video received over 9 million views in its first 24 hours. The Actor Shiloh Fernandez appears in the music video as Gomez's love interest.

The UK edition of the International Business Times called the video "emotionally charged". Artist Direct wrote that the video contained "a painful, powerful and emotional visual opening."

As of September 2023, the video has accrued over 840 million views.

== Live performance ==
Gomez performed the single for the first time at the 2014 American Music Awards. In her presentation, Gomez wore a skin-colored dress, and the background consisted of images as dark lights, thorns, roses, broken glass and wings appeared behind her on the screen. At the end of her performance, the singer added the phrase "I thought you were the one...".

Caitlin White from MTV described the visuals as "amazing" and said: "It is a more mature song for Selena, but one that almost everyone in the audience could relate, given the intense and emotional response public." The Wrap's Matt Donnelly wrote that it was "a considerable growth moment" for the singer. Casey Rackham of Zap2it called the performance "beautifully and emotionally intense." She commented that the use of wings was "pretty empowering." After her presentation at the American Music Awards, the song went to number one on the Billboard Twitter Real-Time, position it had occupied in its release.

An instrumental version of the song was used as an interlude on the Revival Tour in 2016.

== Track listings ==
- Digital download
1. "The Heart Wants What It Wants" – 3:47
- Digital download – remixes
1. "The Heart Wants What It Wants" (DJ Kue Remix) – 4:34
2. "The Heart Wants What It Wants" (DJ Kue Alternate Remix) – 4:28
3. "The Heart Wants What It Wants" (Cosmic Dawn Club Mix) – 6:57
4. "The Heart Wants What It Wants" (Cosmic Dawn Remix Edit) – 4:32
5. "The Heart Wants What It Wants" (Cosmic Dawn Club Mix) [Instrumental] – 6:57
6. "The Heart Wants What It Wants" (Ruff Loaderz Remix) – 5:19
7. "The Heart Wants What It Wants" (Ruff Loaderz Radio Remix) – 3:35
8. "The Heart Wants What It Wants" (Ultimix by Mark Roberts) – 5:49

== Credits and personnel ==
Recording and management

- Recorded, Engineered and Mixed at Rock Mafia Studios (Santa Monica, California)
- Mastered at Sterling Sound (New York City)
- Good Fellowship Publishing (ASCAP) administered by Seven Peaks Music (ASCAP); Downtown DLJ Songs obo Antonina Songs (ASCAP); David Jost Music Publishing (GEMA); Downtown DMP Songs obo Akashic Field Music (BMI)

Personnel

- Selena Gomez – vocals, songwriting
- Antonina Armato – songwriting; production, mixing (as part of Rock Mafia)
- David Jost – songwriting
- Tim James – songwriting; production, mixing (as part of Rock Mafia)
- Devrim Karaoglu – additional production
- Steve Hammons – additional production, engineering, mix engineering
- Dubkiller – additional production
- Jon Vella – additional production
- Xander Singh – additional production
- Ace Ha – additional production
- Adam Comstock – engineering
- Rami Jaffee – vibraphone, mellotron
- Chris Gehringer – mastering

Credits adapted from For You liner notes.

== Charts ==
=== Weekly charts ===
| Chart (2014–2015) | Peak position |
|---|---|
| Australia (ARIA) | 33 |
| Austria (Ö3 Austria Top 40) | 48 |
| Belgium (Ultratop 50 Flanders) | 33 |
| Belgium (Ultratop 50 Wallonia) | 23 |
| Canada Hot 100 (Billboard) | 6 |
| Canada CHR/Top 40 (Billboard) | 10 |
| Canada Hot AC (Billboard) | 21 |
| CIS Airplay (TopHit) | 140 |
| Czech Republic Airplay (ČNS IFPI) | 39 |
| Czech Republic Singles Digital (ČNS IFPI) | 6 |
| Denmark (Tracklisten) | 9 |
| Finland (Suomen virallinen lista) | 15 |
| France (SNEP) | 30 |
| Germany (GfK) | 53 |
| Greece Digital Songs (Billboard) | 1 |
| Hungary (Single Top 40) | 13 |
| Hungary (Stream Top 40) | 10 |
| Ireland (IRMA) | 60 |
| Italy (FIMI) | 80 |
| Lebanon (Lebanese Top 20) | 4 |
| Mexico (Mexico Airplay) | 36 |
| Mexico Ingles Airplay (Billboard) | 36 |
| Netherlands (Single Top 100) | 58 |
| New Zealand (Recorded Music NZ) | 19 |
| Norway (VG-lista) | 13 |
| Romania (Airplay 100) | 38 |
| Scottish Singles Sales (Official Charts) | 22 |
| Slovakia Airplay (ČNS IFPI) | 40 |
| Slovakia Singles Digital (ČNS IFPI) | 7 |
| South Africa Airplay (EMA) | 8 |
| Spain (Promusicae) | 23 |
| Sweden (Sverigetopplistan) | 53 |
| Switzerland (Schweizer Hitparade) | 52 |
| UK Singles (Official Charts) | 30 |
| US Billboard Hot 100 | 6 |
| US Adult Contemporary (Billboard) | 18 |
| US Adult Pop Airplay (Billboard) | 18 |
| US Dance Club Songs (Billboard) | 35 |
| US Latin Pop Airplay (Billboard) | 32 |
| US Pop Airplay (Billboard) | 7 |
| US Rhythmic Airplay (Billboard) | 30 |

=== Year-end charts ===
| Chart (2015) | Position |
|---|---|
| Canada (Canadian Hot 100) | 63 |
| US Billboard Hot 100 | 62 |
| US Mainstream Top 40 (Billboard) | 43 |

== Certifications ==
| Region | Certification | Certified units/sales |
|---|---|---|
| Australia (ARIA) | Platinum | 70,000^{‡} |
| Brazil (Pro-Música Brasil) | Diamond | 250,000^{‡} |
| Canada (Music Canada) | Platinum | 80,000^{*} |
| Denmark (IFPI Danmark) | Platinum | 90,000^{‡} |
| Italy (FIMI) | Gold | 25,000^{‡} |
| New Zealand (RMNZ) | Platinum | 30,000^{‡} |
| Norway (IFPI Norway) | 4× Platinum | 240,000^{‡} |
| Sweden (GLF) | Gold | 20,000^{‡} |
| United Kingdom (BPI) | Silver | 200,000^{‡} |
| United States (RIAA) | 4× Platinum | 4,000,000^{‡} |
^{*} Sales figures based on certification alone.^{‡} Sales+streaming figures based on certification alone.
