= Geronimo (Aura Dione song) =

Single by Aura Dione

from the album Before the Dinosaurs
- B-side: "Call Messiah"
- Released: 19 September 2011
- Genre: Pop
- Length: 3:15
- Label: Island, Universal, Koolmusic
- Songwriters: Aura Dione, David Jost, Joachim Persson, Ian O'Brien-Docker, Michael Lowdst, Andrei Georgescu, Thomas Troelsen.
- Producers: David Jost, DamienDamien, Joachim Persson

Aura Dione singles chronology
| "Something from Nothing" (2010) | "Geronimo" (2011) | "Friends" (2012) |

"Geronimo" is a song by Danish singer-songwriter Aura Dione from her second studio album, Before the Dinosaurs. The song was released as the album's lead single on 19 September 2011. "Geronimo" is a pop song with folk elements, with critics comparing the song's arrangement to Shakira. It was written by Aura Dione, David Jost, Joachim, Ian O'Brien-Docker, Michael Lowdst, Andrei Georgescu, and Thomas Troelsen, and it was produced by David Jost, DamienDamien and Joachim Persson. According to Aura, the song is about staying true to yourself and living out your dreams, and is one of her favourite songs on the album.

It became Dione's first number-one single in both Austria and her native Denmark, and her second in Germany. Dione is also the first Danish artist to debut at number one in Germany. The song charted at number seven in Switzerland, becoming Dione's highest-charting single since "I Will Love You Monday (365)" (2010).

== Track listing ==
- Danish digital download
1. "Geronimo" (Jost & Damien Radio Mix) – 3:15
- Danish digital download – remixes
1. "Geronimo" (Martin Roth Clubmix) – 6:43
2. "Geronimo" (The Disco Boys Remix) – 5:38
3. "Geronimo" (The Disco Boys Remix Edit) – 3:23
4. "Geronimo" (LTM Slowdown Remix) – 8:12
- German digital EP
1. "Geronimo" (Jost & Damien Radio Mix) – 3:15
2. "Geronimo" (The Disco Boys Remix Edit) – 3:23
3. "Geronimo" (The Disco Boys Remix) – 5:38
4. "Geronimo" (LTM Slowdown Remix) – 8:12
5. "Call Messiah" (Aura Dione, Per Ebdrup) – 6:53
- German CD single
1. "Geronimo" (Jost & Damien Radio Mix)
2. "Geronimo" (The Disco Boys Remix)

== Credits and personnel ==
- Aura Dione – songwriter, vocals
- David Jost – songwriter, producer, mixing, vocal recording, guitar, programming
- Joachim Persson – songwriter, producer, mixing, programming
- Ian O'Brien-Docker – songwriter, producer, guitar, keys, programming
- Thomas Troelsen – songwriter, vocal recording, backing vocals, and keyboards
- DamienDamien – producer, mixing
- Sebastian Zenke – guitar, programming
- Johan Alkenäs – additional keys and programming

== Charts and certifications ==
=== Weekly charts ===
| Chart (2011–12) | Peak position |
|---|---|
| Austria (Ö3 Austria Top 40) | 1 |
| Denmark (Tracklisten) | 1 |
| Czech Republic Airplay (ČNS IFPI) | 40 |
| France (SNEP) | 95 |
| Germany (GfK) | 1 |
| Russia Airplay (TopHit) | 13 |
| Slovakia Airplay (ČNS IFPI) | 17 |
| Switzerland (Schweizer Hitparade) | 7 |
| Ukraine Airplay (TopHit) | 38 |

=== Year-end charts ===
| Chart (2011) | Position |
|---|---|
| Austria (Ö3 Austria Top 40) | 34 |
| Denmark (Tracklisten) | 11 |
| Germany (Official German Charts) | 22 |
| Chart (2012) | Position |
| Russia Airplay (TopHit) | 97 |
| Ukraine Airplay (TopHit) | 134 |

=== Certifications ===
| Region | Certification | Certified units/sales |
|---|---|---|
| Austria (IFPI Austria) | Gold | 15,000^{*} |
| Denmark (IFPI Danmark) | Platinum | 30,000^{^} |
| Germany (BVMI) | Platinum | 300,000^{^} |
| Switzerland (IFPI Switzerland) | Gold | 15,000^{^} |
Streaming
| Denmark (IFPI Danmark) | 2× Platinum | 1,800,000^{†} |
^{*} Sales figures based on certification alone.^{^} Shipments figures based on certification alone.^{†} Streaming-only figures based on certification alone.

== Release history ==
| Region | Date | Format | Label |
|---|---|---|---|
| Denmark | 19 September 2011 | Digital download | Koolmusic, Music for Dreams, Universal Music |
| Austria | 21 October 2011 | Digital download | Koolmusic, Island Records, Universal Music |
| Germany | 21 October 2011 | CD single, digital download | Koolmusic, Island Records, Universal Music |
| Switzerland | 21 October 2011 | Digital download | Koolmusic, Island Records, Universal Music |
| Denmark | 28 November 2011 | Digital download – remixes | Koolmusic, Music for Dreams, Universal Music |
