= Before the Dinosaurs (album) =

Studio album by Aura Dione
- Released: 4 November 2011
- Genres: Pop; folktronica; progressive pop
- Labels: Island; Universal; Koolmusic
- Producers: Kenneth Bager (also exec.); DamiemDamien; Robin Grubert; David Jost; Devrim Karaoğlu; Rock Mafia; Benjamin Mühlethaler; Jochen Naaf; Rick Nowels; Joachim Persson; Thomas Schulz

Aura Dione chronology
Columbine (2008)	Before the Dinosaurs (2011)	Can't Steal the Music (2017)

Singles from Before the Dinosaurs
- 1. "Geronimo" Released: 19 September 2011; 2. "Friends" Released: 2 March 2012; 3. "In Love with the World" Released: 28 May 2012; 4. "Reconnect" Released: October 2012

Before the Dinosaurs is the second studio album by Danish singer-songwriter Aura Dione. The album was released on 4 November 2011 by Universal Music. It was preceded by the lead single, "Geronimo" on 19 September 2011. Upon its release, the album received mixed reviews from most music critics, who compared the singer to Lady Gaga but felt the album was over-produced.

Professional ratings
Review scores
Source	Rating
B.T.	5/6 stars
Berlingske Tidende	3/6 stars
Ekstra Bladet	2/6 stars
Gaffa	4/6 stars
Jyllands-Posten	4/6 stars
Soundvenue	2/6 stars

== Singles ==
"Geronimo" was released as the album's lead single on 19 September 2011. Lyrically, the song is about staying true to yourself and living out your dreams, and is one of Dione's favourite songs on the album. The song was a number one hit in Austria, Denmark and Germany. In Germany, Dione became the first Danish artist to debut at number one.

"Friends" was released as the second single from the album. It was sent for Danish mainstream radio adds on 23 January 2012. The song features German production team Rock Mafia who co-wrote the song with Dione and David Jost. "Friends" was written to let Dione's friends know how precious they are to her. It peaked at number six in Denmark, becoming Dione's third top 10 hit following "Geronimo" (2011) and "Something from Nothing" (2007).

"In Love with the World" was released as the album's third single. Co-written by Rick Nowels, "In Love with the World" is about the sacrifices Dione had to make to pursue her career, and "letting go of someone who loves me, because maybe he doesn't love me enough to let me be free". Aura Dione performed the song for the first time in Denmark on late-night talk show Clement Søndag on 22 April 2012. It impacted Danish radio on 28 May 2012. The song peaked at number five in Denmark.

In October 2012, "Reconnect" was added to Danish radio station DR P3 as the album's fourth single.

== Commercial performance ==
In Denmark, the album debuted at number 18 after three days of sale. The following week the album rose to number 11. In its thirty-third week on the chart, Before the Dinosaurs peaked at number six. Before the Dinosaurs debuted and peaked at number 36 in Switzerland on 20 November 2011. In its third and final week on the chart, the album fell to number 83. In Austria, the album debuted at number thirty on 18 November 2011. The album has since been certified gold by the International Federation of the Phonographic Industry (IFPI) for shipments of 10,000 copies in Austria. On October 19 it was confirmed, that Dione will release a re-release of her album, including a bonus DVD.

== Track listing ==
Before the Dinosaurs track listing
No.	Title	Writer(s)	Producer(s)	Length
1.	"Geronimo" (Jost & Damien Radio Mix)	Aura Dione; David Jost; Joachim Persson; Ian O'Brien-Docker; Thomas Troelsen	Jost; DamiemDamien; Persson	3:16
2.	"Reconnect"	Dione; Jost; Robin Grubert	Jost; Grubert; Jochen Naaf	3:55
3.	"Friends" (featuring Rock Mafia)	Dione; Antonina Armato; Tim James; Jost	Rock Mafia; Jost	3:42
4.	"In Love with the World"	Dione; Rick Nowels	Nowels; Devrim Karaoğlu	3:27
5.	"What It's Like"	Dione; Jost; Ross Golan; Persson	Jost; Persson	3:20
6.	"Into the Wild"	Dione; Nowels	Nowels	3:41
7.	"Masterpiece"	Dione; Devrim Karaoğlu; Nowels	Nowels; Karaoğlu	3:55
8.	"Where the Wild Roses Grow"	Dione; Benjamin Mühlethaler; Thomas Schulz; Kenneth Bager; Roger Massimo	Mühlethaler; Schulz; Bager	3:11
9.	"America"	Dione; Karaoğlu; Nowels	Nowels; Karaoğlu	3:44
10.	"Recipe"	Dione; Nowels	Nowels; Karaoğlu	3:42
11.	"Superhuman"	Dione; Nowels	Nowels; Karaoğlu	3:50
12.	"Before the Dinosaurs"	Dione; Nowels	Nowels	4:09

German iTunes Store special edition additional track
No.	Title	Writer(s)	Length
13.	"Deja Voodoo"	Aura Dione	4:48

Notes

- The special edition contains twelve commentary tracks where Aura Dione talks about each song on the album.

== Charts ==
=== Weekly charts ===
Weekly chart performance for Before the Dinosaurs
Chart (2011)	Peak position
Austrian Albums (Ö3 Austria)	30
Danish Albums (Hitlisten)	6
German Albums (Offizielle Top 100)	14
Polish Albums (ZPAV)	89
Swiss Albums (Schweizer Hitparade)	36

=== Year-end charts ===
Year-end chart performance for Before the Dinosaurs
Chart (2011)	Position
Danish Albums (Hitlisten)	71

== Certifications ==
Certifications for Before the Dinosaurs
Region	Certification	Certified units/sales
Austria (IFPI Austria)	Gold	10,000^{*}
^{*} Sales figures based on certification alone.

== Release history ==
Release history and formats for Before the Dinosaurs
Region	Date	Format	Label	Edition
Germany	4 November 2011	CD; digital download	Island Records; Universal Music; Koolmusic	Standard edition
Switzerland	4 November 2011	CD; digital download	Island Records; Universal Music; Koolmusic	Standard edition
Austria	4 November 2011	CD; digital download	Island Records; Universal Music; Koolmusic	Standard edition
Netherlands	4 November 2011	CD; digital download	Island Records; Universal Music; Koolmusic	Standard edition
Denmark	4 November 2011	CD; digital download	Island Records; Universal Music; Koolmusic	Standard edition
Poland	31 January 2012	CD; digital download	Magic Records; Universal Music	Standard edition
Germany	27 February 2012	CD; digital download	Island Records; Universal Music; Koolmusic	Cardboard sleeve edition
