= Columbine (album) =

Studio album by Aura Dione
- Released: 28 January 2008 (Denmark); 27 November 2009 (Germany)
- Genre: Pop; folk
- Label: Music for Dreams; Island
- Producer: Kenneth Bager (also exec.); Bird; Per Ebdrup; Jonas Krag; Michael Pfundheller; Thomas Troelsen

Aura Dione chronology
Columbine (2008)	Before the Dinosaurs (2011)

Singles from Columbine
- 1. "I Will Love You Monday (365)" Released: 10 November 2009; 2. "Song for Sophie (I Hope She Flies)" Released: 27 April 2010; 3. "Something from Nothing" Released: 29 October 2010

Columbine is the debut studio album by Danish singer-songwriter Aura Dione. It was released on 28 January 2008 in Denmark by Music for Dreams, and in Germany on 27 November 2009 by Island Records. The German edition includes the number-one single "I Will Love You Monday (365)", "Stay the Same" and "Lulla Goodbye", which did not feature on the original Danish release. A video was shot for the song "Glass Bone Crash". It was released on 8 December 2009.

The album peaked at number three in Denmark, where it has also been certified with Gold by IFPI for sales exceeding 15,000.

== Track listings ==
=== Standard edition ===
All tracks are written by Aura Dione, except where noted.

No.	Title	Producer(s)	Length
1.	"Glass Bone Crash"	Kenneth Bager, Bird
2.	"Little Louie"	Per Ebdrup
3.	"Something from Nothing"	Kenneth Bager, Thomas Troelsen
4.	"Picture of the Moon"	Per Ebdrup
5.	"You Are the Reason"	Per Ebdrup
6.	"Song for Sophie"	Kenneth Bager, Thomas Troelsen
7.	"I Will Love You Monday"
8.	"Clean Hands"
9.	"Are You for Sale"	Jonas Krag
10.	"Anthony"	Mikkel Hess, Kenneth Bager, Michael Pfundheller

Disc 2: Re-release additional tracks
No.	Title	Writer(s)	Producer(s)	Length
1.	"Stay the Same"	Kenneth Bager, Michael Pfundheller, Per Ebdrup	Kenneth Bager, Michael Pfundheller, Per Ebdrup
2.	"Lulla Goodbye"		Kenneth Bager, Jonas Krag
3.	"Song for Sophie" (Acoustic)		Jonas Krag
4.	"Song for Sophie" (Jazzbox Remix)
5.	"I Will Love You Monday" (Fagget Fairys Remix)
6.	"Something from Nothing" (Jazzbox Remix)
7.	"You Are the Reason" (DJ Disse Remix)
8.	"I Will Love You Monday" (Jazzbox Remix)
9.	"Are You for Sale" (Lulu Rouge Remix)
10.	"I Will Love You Monday" (Peter Visti Remix)

=== International edition ===
No.	Title	Length
1.	"Glass Bone Crash"	2:24
2.	"Song for Sophie (I Hope She Flies)"	3:19
3.	"Little Louie"	4:26
4.	"I Will Love You Monday (365)"	3:23
5.	"Clean Hands"	3:51
6.	"Something from Nothing"	3:26
7.	"Picture of the Moon"	2:44
8.	"Stay the Same"	3:11
9.	"Are You for Sale"	2:09
10.	"You Are the Reason"	3:02
11.	"Antony"	4:40
12.	"Lulla Goodbye"	3:27

== Charts ==
Weekly chart performance for Columbine
Chart (2004)	Peak position
Austrian Albums (Ö3 Austria)	31
Danish Albums (Hitlisten)	3
German Albums (Offizielle Top 100)	44
Greece Albums (IFPI)	46
Swiss Albums (Schweizer Hitparade)	30

== Certifications ==
Certifications for Columbine
Region	Certification	Certified units/sales
Denmark (IFPI Danmark)	Gold	15,000^{^}
^{*} Sales figures based on certification alone.^{^} Shipments figures based on certification alone.
