= Katy Tiz =

English singer-songwriter (born 1988)

- Born: Kate Alexandra Tizzard; 6 July 1988 (age 38); England, U.K.
- Genres: Pop
- Occupation: Singer-songwriter
- Instrument: Vocals
- Years active: 2012–present
- Labels: 5Towns Records (former); Atlantic (former); Lava, Republic (former)

Kate Alexandra Tizzard (born 6 July 1988), known professionally as Katy Tiz, is an English singer-songwriter. She has achieved success for her contributions to the song "Following the Sun" (2020), a cover version of Rock Mafia's single "The Big Bang" (2014), and "Whistle (While You Work It)" (2015).

== Career ==
In late 2012, she was signed to Lava/Republic, and Warner/Chappell Publishing, and released three stand-alone singles, "Famous", "Heart" and "Red Cup".

Shortly after parting ways with Lava/Republic in 2013, Tiz partnered with songwriting/production duo Rock Mafia. Tiz released a cover of Rock Mafia's song "The Big Bang", which debuted on the Billboard Hot 100 on 17 May 2014.

Besides her own music, Tiz has also written hits for other artists such as Girls' Generation, Cheryl Cole, among others. Other co-writing credits include Dimitri Vegas, Syn Cole, Gabry Ponte, Sarah Jeffery, Park Ye-eun and High15 whose track 'No Drama' was performed at the 2019 Melodifestivalen.

Tiz has co-written and featured on a number of successful dance tracks including the 2016 single 'Samurai' with Canadian DJ and producer Vanic and the Martin Jensen edit of 'So We Go' with Lithuanian music producer Gaullin in 2020. Tiz is also a dolphin trainer.

In May 2014, she was picked as Elvis Duran's Artist of the Month and was featured on NBC's Today show hosted by Kathy Lee Gifford and Hoda Kotb, where she performed live his single "The Big Bang".

Tiz released a follow-up single in 2015, "Whistle (While You Work It)". Tiz said in an interview that she wrote the song about a darker period in her life where she felt like nothing was going her way, but her brother was there to tell her to chin up, keep moving, and never give up. It was cowritten with Kinetics & One Love and Emily Warren and was produced by JR Rotem.

A music video for "Whistle (While You Work It)" was filmed and released by Syndrome Studio and director James Larese. The Xanadu-like video combines live action with animation elements and shows Tiz springing to life from street art, then proceeding on an adventure with a crew of animated animal friends. As of 2025 the video has over 9 million views on YouTube. For The Sims 4: Get to Work expansion pack, Whistle was recorded in the fictional language 'Simlish'. Tiz is an avid animal lover and fan of Banksy's street art and has said in an interview, "This video comes from my love of graffiti artwork and takes inspiration from some of the greatest fairytales of all time."

Her song "Famous" was also covered in Simlish for The Sims 3: Island Paradise expansion pack.

=== Neeka ===
Tiz started the indie dance group Neeka in collaboration with Swedish songwriter Negin Djafari. The duo's first single "Following the Sun" was released with Tiz's brother's band Super-Hi (with Super-Hi members George Tizzard and Rick Parkhouse also being the Red Triangle production team).

"Following the Sun" was released in October 2020 and received significant radio airplay, including being named as BBC Radio 1's 'Song of the Week' in 2021. In January 2021, the track charted in the top 40 radio chart in Germany and by 28 March 2022, the song by Super-Hi x Neeka had climbed to number 21 on the Australian ARIA Top 50 Singles chart.

== Discography ==
=== Singles ===
Year	Song	Peak chart positions					Certifications	Album
Year	Song	AUS	NZ	US	US Pop	US Heat	Certifications	Album
2012	"Famous"	—	—	—	—	—		Non-album singles
2013	"Heart"	—	—	—	—	—		Non-album singles
2013	"Red Cup"	—	—	—	—	—		Non-album singles
2014	"The Big Bang"	—	—	100	26	11		Non-album singles
2015	"Whistle (While You Work It)"	42	14	120	—	—	RMNZ: Gold	Non-album singles
2016	"Samurai" (Vanic featuring Katy Tiz)	—	—	—	—	—		Non-album singles
2018	"Life" (featuring Ed Drewett)	—	—	—	—	—		Non-album singles
2020	"So We Go" (Gaullin featuring Katy Tiz)	—	—	—	—	—		Non-album singles
2021	"Sorry I Ain't Sorry" (with Syn Cole and Willem)	—	—	—	—	—		Non-album singles
"—" denotes a recording that did not chart or was not released.

=== Singles as part of Neeka ===
Year	Song	Peak chart positions					Certifications	Album
Year	Song	AUS	NZ	US	US Pop	US Heat	Certifications	Album
2021	"Following the Sun" (with Super-Hi)	21	—	—	—	—	RMNZ: 2× Platinum	
"—" denotes a recording that did not chart or was not released.
