= Following the Sun =

Following the Sun may refer to:

- "Following the Sun" (Enigma song), released in 2003
- "Following the Sun" (Super-Hi and Neeka song), released in 2020
