= I'll Kiss It Away =

Single by Sarah Connor

from the album Sexy as Hell
- Released: 7 November 2008
- Length: 3:28
- Label: X-Cell
- Songwriter(s): Sarah Connor; Kay Denar; Rob Tyger
- Producer(s): Kay D.; Rob Tyger

Sarah Connor singles chronology
"Under My Skin" (2008)	"I'll Kiss It Away" (2008)	"Takin' Back My Love" (2009)

"I'll Kiss It Away" is a song by German recording artist Sarah Connor. It was written by Connor along with frequent collaborators, Rob Tyger and Kay Denar, for her sixth studio album, Sexy as Hell (2008), while production was helmed by Tyger and Denar. A mid-tempo pop ballad with contemporary R&B influences that deals with Connor's feelings during the hospitalization of her second child Summer, "I'll Kiss It Away" was released by X-Cell Records as the album's second and final single on 7 November 2008.

== Background ==
"I'll Kiss It Away" was written by Connor along with frequent collaborators, Rob Tyger and Kay Denar, for her sixth studio album, Sexy as Hell (2008). A dedication to her daughter Summer, her second child with American pop singer Marc Terenzi, who was born with a congenital heart defect in June 2006, the song deals with Connor's feelings during her time in the hospital in the weeks following the birth. Connor, who struggled to finish writing the song due to its emotional subject matter, called "I'll Kiss It Away" her most personal record yet. Musically, "I'll Kiss It Away" is a mid-tempo pop ballad with contemporary R&B influences that combines classic chord progression on an acoustic guitar with a modern-sounding 808 drum beat.

== Chart performance ==
Released as the second and final single from parent album Sexy as Hell on 7 November 2008 in German-speaking Europe, "I'll Kiss It Away" peaked at number twenty-one in Germany in the week of 21 November 2008, where it became Connor's first single to miss the top twenty of the German Singles Chart since 2001's "French Kissing." In Austria, the song peaked at number 46 on the Austrian Singles Chart, becoming the singer's lowest-charting single yet, while in Switzerland, it peaked higher than previous single "Under My Skin," reaching number 67 on the Swiss Singles Chart.

== Music video ==
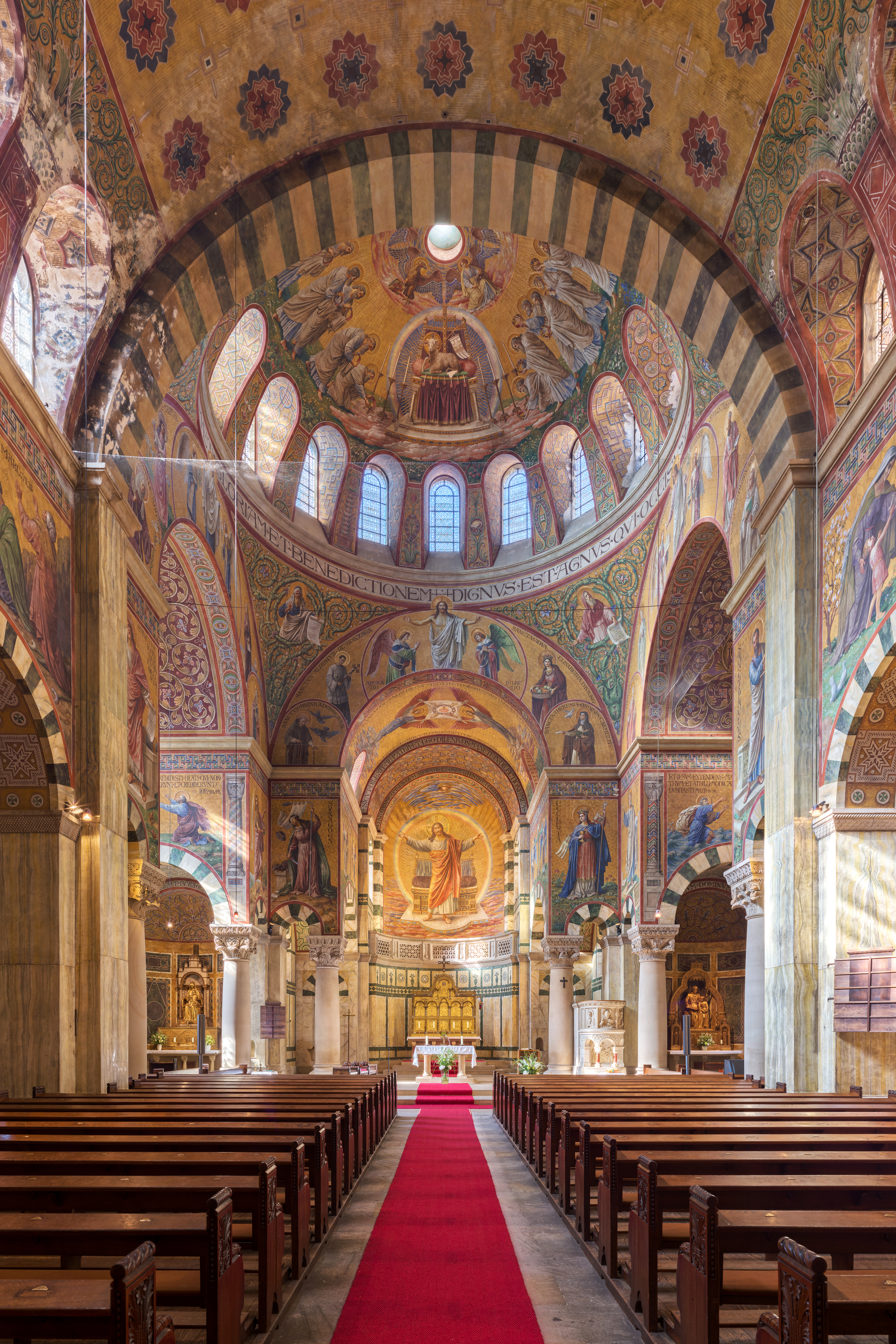
Portions of the visuals were filmed inside the Sacred Heart Church in Berlin.

Connor reteamed with frequent collaborator Oliver Sommer to film a music video for "I'll Kiss It Away." The visuals depict Connor, dressed in a black turtleneck sweater, waiting in a hospital hallway. It also features scenes of her interacting wirth her daughter as well as a performing sequence that was shot at the Sacred Heart Church in Berlin, a Catholic church located in Prenzlauer Berg borough.

== Track listing ==
All tracks written Sarah Connor, Kay Denar, and Rob Tyger; produced by Denar and Tyger.

Digital single
No.	Title	Length
1.	"I'll Kiss It Away" (radio version)	3:29
2.	"I'll Kiss It Away" (acoustic version)	3:27
3.	"Your Love Is Dangerous"	3:59
4.	"I'll Kiss It Away" (live version)	3:30

== Charts ==
Weekly chart performance for "I'll Kiss It Away"
Chart (2008)	Peak position
Austria (Ö3 Austria Top 40)	46
Europe (Eurochart Hot 100)	69
Germany (GfK)	21
Switzerland (Schweizer Hitparade)	67
