= Stefano Langone =

American singer (born 1989)

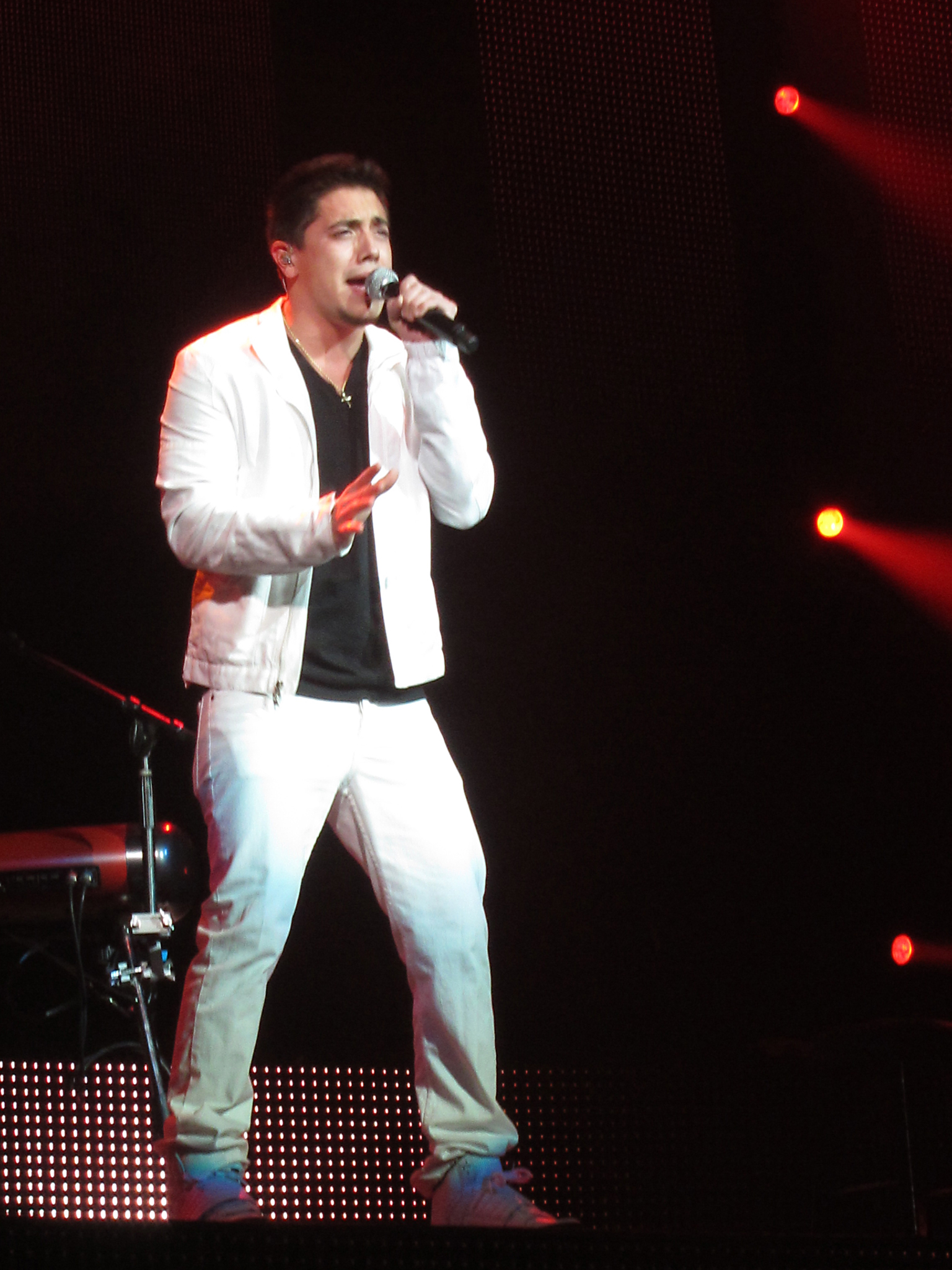
- Langone in 2011

Background information
- Also known as: Stefano
- Born: February 27, 1989 (age 37); Bellevue, Washington, US
- Origin: Kent, Washington, U.S.
- Genres: R&B; soul; pop
- Occupations: Singer; musician
- Instruments: Vocals; piano
- Years active: 2011–present
- Labels: 19; Hollywood Records (2012–2013)
- Website: www.stefanomusic.com

Stefano Langone (/stɛˈfɑːnoʊˌlæŋˈɡoʊni/; born February 27, 1989), known as Stefano in his recording career, is an American singer and musician from Kent, Washington. Langone placed seventh on the tenth season of American Idol. Post American Idol, Langone pursued his musical career and became an independent artist in January 2014.

== Early life ==
Langone was born on February 27, 1989, in Bellevue, Washington, to Ernie and Carrie Langone. His father is Italian and his mother is Mexican. His father works as a career advisor at The Art Institute of Seattle and is also a singer and musician. Langone has been singing and playing the piano since childhood. He attended Emerald Park Elementary School, Meridian Junior High, and Kentwood High School, as well as Bellevue College, where he was given a full ride scholarship. He performed with Bellevue College's 'Celebration!' vocal jazz ensemble while he was a student there.

== American Idol ==
Langone auditioned for the tenth season of American Idol in San Francisco, California. He advanced to the Top 13 through a wild card selection by Jennifer Lopez. Langone was eliminated from the show on April 21, 2011, finishing in seventh place.

=== Performances/results ===
Episode	Theme	Song choice	Original artist	Order #	Result
Audition	Auditioner's Choice	"I Heard It Through the Grapevine"	Marvin Gaye	N/A	Advanced
Hollywood Round, Part 1	First Solo	Not aired		N/A	Advanced
Hollywood Round, Part 2	Group Performance	Not aired		N/A	Advanced
Hollywood Round, Part 3	Second Solo	"Sir Duke"	Stevie Wonder	N/A	Advanced
Las Vegas Round	Songs of The Beatles; Group Performance	"Get Back"	The Beatles	N/A	Advanced
Hollywood Round Final	Final Solo	"Come Home"	Stefano Langone	N/A	Advanced
Top 24 (12 Men)	Personal Choice	"Just the Way You Are"	Bruno Mars	9	Wild Card
Wild Card	Personal Choice	"I Need You Now"	Smokie Norful	2	Advanced
Top 13	Your Personal Idol	"Lately"	Stevie Wonder	10	Safe
Top 12	Year You Were Born	"If You Don't Know Me by Now"	Harold Melvin & the Blue Notes	6	Safe
Top 11	Motown	"Hello"	Lionel Richie	5	Bottom 3^{1}
Top 11^{2}	Elton John	"Tiny Dancer"	Elton John	5	Safe
Top 9	Rock & Roll Hall of Fame	"When a Man Loves a Woman"	Percy Sledge	8	Bottom 3^{3}
Top 8	Songs from the Movies	"End of the Road" — Boomerang	Boyz II Men	3	Bottom 3^{4}
Top 7	Songs from the 21st Century	"Closer"	Ne-Yo	6	Eliminated

- ^Note 1 When Ryan Seacrest announced the results for this particular night, Langone was among the Bottom 3, but declared safe second as Casey Abrams received the fewest votes and was saved by the judges.
- ^Note 2 Due to the judges using their one save on Casey Abrams, the Top 11 remained intact for another week.
- ^Note 3 When Ryan Seacrest announced the results for this particular night, Langone was among the Bottom 3, but declared safe second as Pia Toscano was eliminated.
- ^Note 4 When Ryan Seacrest announced the results for this particular night, Langone was among the Bottom 3, but declared safe second as Paul McDonald was eliminated.

== Career ==
=== 2010-2011: Before and after Idol ===
Following Langone's accident he turned to music to aid his recovery. With the help of his father, he began uploading covers and original music to his YouTube account as early as May 29, 2010. His original upload garnered over 100,000 views, encouraging him to pursue a wider audience. On February 9, 2011, he auditioned for the tenth season of American Idol in San Francisco California performing Marvin Gaye's "I Heard It Through the Grapevine".

Following his Idol elimination, Langone appeared on several talk shows. He appeared on Live with Regis and Kelly on April 25, 2011, as well as The Today Show on April 26, 2011. In addition, Langone appeared on The Rachael Ray Show along with Paul McDonald and Pia Toscano on May 25, 2011. The following summer, Langone toured with the American Idols LIVE! Tour 2011, which began in West Valley City, Utah, on July 6, 2011, and ended in Manila, Philippines, on September 21, 2011.

On September 24, 2011, Langone sang the National Anthem at the Western Hockey League game opener between the Seattle Thunderbirds and Portland Winterhawks. On September 26, 2011, Langone and James Durbin appeared on Dr. Drew's "Lifechangers" TV Talk show.

=== 2011-2015: Record deal and debut album ===
Langone was co-managed by 19 Entertainment and Red Light Management. In January 2012, Langone announced that he has signed a record contract with Hollywood Records. While recording his debut album, Langone has performed at several events. On October 15, 2011, Langone performed at Eva Longoria’s Charity Padres El Cáncer in Las Vegas. On November 24, 2011, Langone performed at the Philadelphia Thanksgiving Day Parade. Langone took part in the Hollywood Christmas Parade on November 27, 2011. On December 4, 2011, Langone performed at Trevor Live, an event benefiting The Trevor Project. Langone performed the National Anthem at a San Francisco 49ers and Pittsburgh Steelers December 2011 game. On February 8, 2012, Langone performed in a Motown music tribute at Carnegie Hall.

On April 26, 2012, Langone returned to American Idol to perform his debut single, "I'm on a Roll". "I'm on a Roll" was released on iTunes on April 24. The track sold around 20,000 in its first week.

On July 16, Langone performed "I'm on a Roll" on Good Morning America.

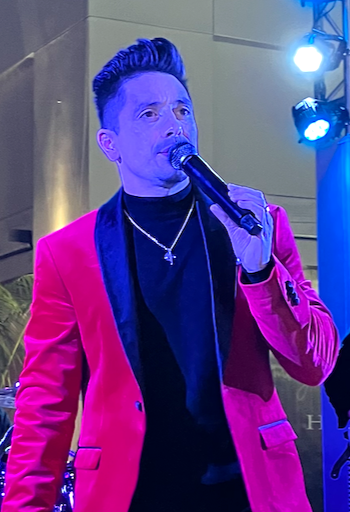
Stefano Langone, performing in November 2024 in Manhattan Beach, California

Langone was co-managed by 19 Entertainment and Red Light Management. In January 2012, Langone announced that he has signed a record contract with Hollywood Records. On October 15, 2011, Langone performed at Eva Longoria's Charity Padres El Cáncer in Las Vegas. On November 24, 2011, Langone performed at the Philadelphia Thanksgiving Day Parade. Langone took part in the Hollywood Christmas Parade on November 27, 2011. On December 4, 2011, Langone performed at Trevor Live, an event benefiting The Trevor Project. Langone performed the National Anthem at a San Francisco 49ers and Pittsburgh Steelers December 2011 game. On February 8, 2012, Langone performed in a Motown music tribute at Carnegie Hall.

Langone's second single "Yes to Love" was released on February 12, 2013. Langone performed "Yes to Love" on American Idol on April 25, 2013.

On April 26, 2012, Langone returned to American Idol to perform his debut single, "I'm on a Roll". "I'm on a Roll" was released on April 24. The track sold around 20,000 in its first week. On July 16, Langone performed "I'm on a Roll" on Good Morning America.

Langone's second single "Yes to Love" was released on February 12, 2013. Langone performed "Yes to Love" on American Idol on April 25, 2013.

Langone released a single "Lemon Squeeze", produced by a new label SpeakerMind Productions, on October 17, 2014. He released another single, "Fill My Cup," on February 17, 2015. This single was supposed to be followed by his debut, Obsession, later that year. Obsession was ultimately released a year later as a five-track EP.

=== 2015-present: As an independent artist ===
Following the end of his recording contract, Langone collaborated with Postmodern Jukebox to perform a number of covers, including with Pia Toscano to perform a duet of Andrea Bocelli's "The Prayer on August 3, 2017, alone covered Ed Sheeran's "The Shape of You" on June 21, 2018 and with the Jonas Brothers on "Sucker" on June 21, 2019.

In 2018, Langone performed with Kenny "Babyface" Edmonds at the Kennedy Center. He released the singles "Call It Love" on June 18, 2019, "Invincible" on May 14, 2020, "Next Year" on October 20, 2020, and "Why I Am Here" on December 19, 2020.

In December 2021, Langone announced he suffered from a vocal polyp which restricted the use of his vocal chords and left him on vocal rest for two months, prior to surgery which occurred earlier the next year. He would begin singing again in spring 2021, when he performed the national anthem at the Stables Center for an NHL match on April 26, 2021 between the Los Angeles Kings and Anaheim Ducks.

Langone toured as part of Kenny "Babyface" Edmonds's Full Circle Tour which began in April 2022.

== Personal life ==
On May 28, 2009, he was involved in a near-fatal accident after being hit by a drunk driver. The accident resulted in two broken arms, a fractured pelvis, and other serious injuries. In addition, Langone had to learn to walk again and has extensive scarring as a result of the accident.

On May 16, 2010, Langone was arrested on suspicion of DUI a year after the accident. He was later only charged with a lesser crime of first-degree negligent driving for which he pleaded guilty to negligent driving.

He married Chelsea Corp in Los Angeles on July 27, 2019.

== Discography ==
=== Singles ===
Title	Year	Peak chart positions	Album
Title	Year	US AC	Album
"I'm on a Roll" (featuring New Boyz & Rock Mafia)	2012	49	Non-album singles
"Yes to Love"	2013	—	Non-album singles
"Lemon Squeeze"	2014	—	Non-album singles
"Fill My Cup" (featuring Dave'Ron Madden)	2015	—	Non-album singles
"Call It Love"	2019	—	Non-album singles
"Invincible"	2020	—	Non-album singles
"Next Year"	2020	—	Non-album singles

=== EPs ===
Year	Title
2016	Obsession
