= Private (band) =

Danish pop band

PRIVATE
- Origin: Copenhagen, Denmark
- Genres: Europop, synthpop, dance-pop
- Years active: 2006–2013
- Labels: Universal Denmark; I AM PRIVATE
- Past members: Thomas Troelsen
- Website: http://www.weareprivate.com (Website no longer active)

PRIVATE was a pop music group formed in 2006 by Danish producer/singer Thomas Troelsen, along with guitarist Asger Tarpgaard and vocalist Tanja Simonsen, and was later a solo project by Troelsen. PRIVATE's debut album “My Secret Lover” was produced and recorded by Troelsen and mixed by Jason Boshoff (Basement Jaxx). The first single, of the same title, achieved Gold sales in Denmark and reached #1 on the Danish singles, radio, and download charts. "My Secret Lover" was released in the UK on 17 January 2010 on Virgin Records with remixes by Diplo, Egyptian Lover, Spencer & Hill, and Rune RK.

PRIVATE's debut received attention from a number of influential blogs including Perezhilton.com, Arjanwrites.com and the UK's Popjustice, who called the single "completely hypnotic and brilliant." The band has also been featured in Dazed & Confused, NME, Attitude, The Guardian, and Monocle. On his blog, Diplo —who remixed "My Secret Lover"—called PRIVATE "the best current pop music group in the world."

The Spencer & Hill remix of the track was featured on Friday Floor Fillers with Scott Mills on BBC's Radio 1. The track was also Record of the Week on Scott Mills' show on 7 December 2009 and Nick Grimshaw's show in September 2009.

In February 2010, Diplo's remix of "My Secret Lover" was featured in Prada's Spring/Summer 2010 Womenswear commercial.

On 3 September 2012 PRIVATE released “Everywhere,” a single featuring O.T. Genasis on Universal Music Denmark. The release featured remixes by MSTRKRFT, Sun Airway, Its Overture, DJ Woody, Flemming Dalum, Shoe Scene Symphony, Aylen, and Kannamix. Perez Hilton premiered the release and it was further profiled by Popjustice, Arjan Writes, and Interview Magazine.

On 12 April 2013 PRIVATE released "Hell Ain't a Bad Place To Be," a second single on Universal Music Denmark. The release was also profiled by Popjustice and Arjan writes, among others.

== Discography ==
=== Albums ===
Year	Title	DK Album chart	Certifications
2007	My Secret Lover: Universal Music; Released: 8 October 2007	9	
2012	"Everywhere": Universal Music; Released: 2012		
2013	"Hell Ain't A Bad Place To Be": Universal Music; Released: 2013		

=== Singles ===
Year	Title	Denmark		Album
Year	Title	Single chart	Airplay	Album
2007	"My Secret Lover"	1	1	My Secret Lover
2007	"Crucify My Heart"	4	1	My Secret Lover
2008	"We Got Some Breaking Up to Do"			My Secret Lover
2008	"Killer on the Dancefloor"			My Secret Lover
