= I Will Love You Monday (365) =

Single by Aura Dione

from the album Columbine
- B-side: "I Will Love You Monday"
- Released: 10 November 2009
- Genre: Country pop (original); dance pop (365)
- Length: 3:24
- Label: Island
- Songwriter(s): Aura Dione, Viktoria Sandström, Patrik Berggren, David Åström

Aura Dione singles chronology
"Only Here For a Moment" (2009)	"I Will Love You Monday (365)" (2009)	"Song for Sophie (I Hope She Flies)" (2010)

"I Will Love You Monday (365)" is a song by Danish singer-songwriter Aura Dione from her debut album Columbine. It was released as her debut single in Europe on 10 November 2009 by Island Records, except Denmark, where the original version, "I Will Love You Monday", was released as her third single in August 2008. The international version has another chorus and more instruments added compared to the original Danish version. Both versions are included on the German release.

In Germany "I Will Love You Monday (365)" reached No. 1 in its fourth week on the chart. It became No. 2 in Switzerland and Austria and charted within on the European Hot 100. The Danish version reached No. 20 in Denmark.

== Music video ==
The music video shows Dione walking through different areas of Copenhagen followed by her shoes which dance and sing with her.

== Track listings ==
Digital download
No.	Title	Length
1.	"I Will Love You Monday (365)"	3:22
2.	"I Will Love You Monday"	3:32
3.	"I Will Love You Monday (365)" (Ian Pooley Clubmix)	5:48
4.	"I Will Love You Monday (365)" (Ian Pooley Remix)	6:29

CD maxi single
No.	Title	Length
1.	"I Will Love You Monday (365)"	3:24
2.	"I Will Love You Monday"	3:34
3.	"I Will Love You Monday (365)" (Ian Pooley Clubmix)	5:48

CD single
No.	Title	Length
1.	"I Will Love You Monday (365)"	3:24
2.	"I Will Love You Monday"	3:32

== Credits and personnel ==
- Aura Dione – songwriter
- Viktoria Sandström – songwriter, backing vocals
- Patrik Berggren – songwriter, drums and drum programming, strings
- David Åström – songwriter, drums and drum programming, strings
- Kenneth Bager – arrangement
- Per Ebdrup – arrangement, bass, programming
- Kocky & Trash – co-producer
- Gustaf Ljunggren – guitar, pedal steel guitar
- Jonas Krag – mouth organ
- Stefan Olsson – bass, programming, acoustic guitar, chorus guitar
- Tomas Barfod – drums and drum programming
- Jan Eliasson – mastering

Credits adapted from CD single liner notes.

== Charts and certifications ==
=== Charts ===
"I Will Love You Monday"

Chart (2008)	Peak position
Denmark (Tracklisten)	20

"I Will Love You Monday (365)"

Chart (2010)	Peak position
Austria (Ö3 Austria Top 40)	2
Czech Republic (Rádio – Top 100)	11
Netherlands (Single Top 100)	58
Europe (European Hot 100 Singles)	8
Germany (GfK)	1
Hungary (Rádiós Top 40)	22
Poland (Polish Airplay Top 100)	3
Slovakia (Rádio Top 100)	14
Switzerland (Schweizer Hitparade)	2

=== Year-end charts ===
Chart (2010)	Position
Austrian Singles Chart	12
European Hot 100 Singles	43
German Singles Chart	24
Swiss Singles Chart	25

=== Certifications ===
Region	Certification	Certified units/sales
Austria (IFPI Austria)	Platinum	30,000^{*}
Germany (BVMI)	Platinum	300,000^{^}
Switzerland (IFPI Switzerland)	Platinum	30,000^{^}
^{*} Sales figures based on certification alone.^{^} Shipments figures based on certification alone.
