= Friends (Aura Dione song) =

Single by Aura Dione featuring Rock Mafia

from the album Before the Dinosaurs
- Released: 2 March 2012
- Recorded: Santa Monica, California, United States (Rock Mafia Studios)
- Genre: Pop
- Length: 3:42
- Label: Island, Universal, Koolmusic
- Songwriters: Aura Dione, Antonina Armato, Tim James, David Jost
- Producers: Rock Mafia, David Jost

Aura Dione singles chronology
"Geronimo" (2011)	"Friends" (2012)	"In Love with the World" (2012)

"Friends" is a song by Danish singer-songwriter Aura Dione from her second studio album, Before the Dinosaurs. The song features production work American production team Rock Mafia who co-wrote the song with Dione and David Jost. Dione wrote the song to let her friends know how precious they are to her. "Friends" was released as the album's second single on 2 March 2012. It became Dione's third top ten hit in her native Denmark, where it peaked at number six. "Friends" also became a top ten hit in Germany, Switzerland and Austria.

== Chart performance ==
The song debuted at number twenty-five on 17 February 2012 in Denmark. The following week the song rose to number twelve. In its third week on the chart the song peaked at number six, becoming Dione's third top 10 single. The song has since been certified gold by IFPI Denmark for sales of 15,000 digital copies. In Switzerland, "Friends" debuted at number sixty-four on the chart issue dated 26 February 2012. In its fourth week on the chart, the song peaked at number ten on 18 March 2012. The song has since been certified gold by International Federation of the Phonographic Industry (IFPI) for shipments of 15,000 copies in Switzerland. "Friends" debuted at number thirteen in Austria on the chart dated 9 March 2012. The following week it peaked at number three. The song debuted at number five in Germany, becoming Dione's third top 10 hit. On the chart issue dated 25 May 2012 the song hit number 1 on Polish Airplay Top 5.

== Live performances ==
Aura Dione performed "Friends" on 30 November 2011 on German television show The Dome along with "Geronimo". On 14 February 2012, Aura performed the song in Moscow, Russia on Big Love Show. On 18 February 2012, she performed the song for the first time on Danish television in the singing competition Voice – The Biggest Voice of Denmark together with the eight semi-finalists.

== Track listing ==
- CD single
1. "Friends" (Rock Mafia & David Jost Radio Mix)
2. "Friends"
- Digital download
1. "Friends" (Rock Mafia & David Jost Radio Mix) – 4:00
2. "Friends" – 3:42
3. "Friends" (Van Beil Remix) – 4:59
4. "Friends" (Banks & Rawdriguez Drumstep Remix) – 3:40
5. "Friends" (Banks & Rawdriguez Moombathon Remix) – 3:18
6. "Friends" (Bodybangers Remix) – 5:22

== Credits and personnel ==
- Aura Dione – songwriter
- Antonina Armato – songwriter, producer, vocal recording
- Tim James – songwriter, producer, vocal recording, mixing
- David Jost – songwriter, producer, vocal recording
- Steve Hammons – engineer
- Adam Comstock – engineer
- Paul Palmer – mixing
- Devrim Karaoğlu – programming
- Sean Hurley – bass
- Rami Jaffee – keyboards
- David Davidson – string arrangement, violin
- David Angel – violin
- Kristin Wilkinson – viola
- John Catchings – cello
- Kai Blankenberg – mastering

Credits adapted from Before the Dinosaurs liner notes.

== Charts and certifications ==
=== Weekly charts ===
Weekly chart performance for "Friends"
Chart (2012)	Peak position
Austria (Ö3 Austria Top 40)	3
Bulgaria (IFPI)	1
Czech Republic Airplay (ČNS IFPI)	8
Denmark (Tracklisten)	6
Germany (GfK)	4
Germany (Airplay Chart)	1
Hungary (Rádiós Top 40)	19
Lebanon (Lebanese Top 20)	2
Luxembourg Digital Songs (Billboard)	2
Poland (Polish Airplay Top 100)	1
Romania (Romanian Top 100)	6
Russia Airplay (TopHit)	2
Slovakia Airplay (ČNS IFPI)	24
Switzerland (Schweizer Hitparade)	10
Ukraine Airplay (TopHit)	7

=== Year-end charts ===
2012 year-end chart performance for "Friends"
Chart (2012)	Position
Austria (Ö3 Austria Top 40)	52
Germany (Official German Charts)	49
Hungary (Rádiós Top 40)	68
Poland – Airplay (ZPAV)	5
Poland – Digital (ZPAV)	32
Russia Airplay (TopHit)	3
Switzerland (Schweizer Hitparade)	74
Ukraine Airplay (TopHit)	14

2013 year-end chart performance for "Friends"
Chart (2013)	Position
Russia Airplay (TopHit)	140
Ukraine Airplay (TopHit)	97

=== Certifications ===
Certifications for "Friends"
Region	Certification	Certified units/sales
Austria (IFPI Austria)	Gold	15,000^{*}
Denmark (IFPI Danmark)	Gold	15,000^{^}
Germany (BVMI)	Gold	150,000^{^}
Switzerland (IFPI Switzerland)	Gold	15,000^{^}
Streaming
Denmark (IFPI Danmark)	Platinum	1,800,000^{†}
^{*} Sales figures based on certification alone.^{^} Shipments figures based on certification alone.^{†} Streaming-only figures based on certification alone.

== Release history ==
Region	Date	Format	Label
Denmark	23 January 2012	Radio airplay	Island Records, Universal Music, Koolmusic
Germany	2 March 2012	CD single, digital download	Island Records, Universal Music, Koolmusic
