= Under My Skin (Sarah Connor song) =

Single by Sarah Connor

from the album Sexy as Hell
- Released: 1 August 2008
- Studio: Delta Lab (Copenhagen)
- Length: 3:17
- Label: X-Cell
- Songwriters: Remee; Thomas Troelsen; Sarah Connor; O. G. Fortuna
- Producers: Remee; Thomas Troelsen

Sarah Connor singles chronology
"Sexual Healing" (2007)	"Under My Skin" (2008)	"I'll Kiss It Away" (2008)

"Under My Skin" is a song by German singer Sarah Connor from her sixth studio album, Sexy as Hell (2008). It was written by Connor along with Remee, Thomas Troelsen, and O. G. Fortuna, and produced by Remee and Troelsen. The song was released as the album's lead single on 1 August 2008. Connor's first uptempo single release since 2005's "From Zero to Hero", the track managed to reach the top twenty in Austria and on a composite European Hot 100 Singles chart, as well as number four in Germany.

== Background ==
"Under My Skin" was composed by the Danish producers Remee and Thomas Troelsen, while lyrics were contributed by Sarah Connor and O. G. Fortuna. A different version of Remee and Troelsen's backing track was bought by Korean label SM Entertainment in January 2008, to be recorded by boy band TVXQ. Re-titled "Mirotic," it features lyrics by Yoo Young-jin and Ryoji Sonoda and was released as the lead single from their fourth studio album Mirotic in September of the same year. Despite the fact that the two original songs were the same composed piece, they have musical differences. While Lucas Secon is credited as a writer on "Mirotic," he is not credited on "Under My Skin."

== Chart performance ==
Connor's first uptempo single release since 2005's "From Zero to Hero", "Under My Skin" debuted at number four on the German Singles Chart in the week of 15 August 2008. It marked her twelfth top ten hit on the chart as well as her highest-peaking song since 2006's "The Best Side of Life." Elsewhere, the song managed to reach the top twenty in Austria, peaking at number eleven on the Austrian Singles Chart, while also reaching number 19 on Billboard's composite European Hot 100 Singles chart. In Switzerland, "Under My Skin" opened and peaked at number 79 on the Swiss Singles Chart, becoming Connor's lowest-charting song yet.

== Music video ==
A music video for "Under My Skin" was directed by Joern Heitmann and filmed at the Tempodrom, a Berlin multi-purpose event venue, on 5 July 2008.

== Track listing ==
Digital single
No.	Title	Writer(s)	Producer(s)	Length
1.	"Under My Skin" (T.S.O.B. mix)	Sarah Connor; O. G. Fortuna; Remee; Thomas Troelsen	Remee; Troelsen	3:14
2.	"Under My Skin" (Delta Lab remix)	Connor; Fortuna; Remee; Troelsen	Remee; Troelsen	3:14
3.	"Touch"	Connor; Anthony Freeman; Bülent Aris	Freeman; Aris	4:08
4.	"Under My Skin" (Club remix)	Connor; Fortuna; Remee; Troelsen	Remee; Troelsen	3:07

== Charts ==
=== Weekly charts ===
Weekly chart performance for "Under My Skin"
Chart (2008)	Peak position
Austria (Ö3 Austria Top 40)	11
European Hot 100 Singles (Billboard)	19
Germany (GfK)	4
Switzerland (Schweizer Hitparade)	79

=== Year-end charts ===
Year-end chart performance for "Under My Skin"
Chart (2008)	Position
Germany (Official German Charts)	82
