= In Love with the World =

Single by Aura Dione

from the album Before the Dinosaurs
- Released: 28 May 2012
- Genre: Folktronica
- Length: 3:27 (album version); 4:11 (radio mix)
- Label: Island, Universal, Koolmusic
- Songwriter(s): Aura Dione, Rick Nowels
- Producer(s): Rick Nowels, Devrim Karaoğlu

Aura Dione singles chronology
"Friends" (2012)	"In Love with the World" (2012)	"Reconnect" (2012)

"In Love with the World" is a song by Danish singer-songwriter Aura Dione from her second studio album, Before the Dinosaurs. It was written by Dione and Rick Nowels, and it was produced by Nowels and Devrim Karaoğlu. The song impacted Danish radio on 28 May 2012 as the album's third single. The song is about the sacrifices Dione had to make to pursue her career, and "letting go of someone who loves me, because maybe he doesn't love me enough to let me be free".

"In Love with the World" became Dione's fourth top 10 single in Denmark, where it peaked at number five.

== Music video ==
The music video for "In Love with the World" premiered through MyVideo on 19 September 2012.

== Chart performance ==
"In Love with the World" debuted at number 29 in Denmark on 29 June 2012. In its eight-week on the chart, the song rose to number five. In September it was certified gold by IFPI Denmark for sales of 15,000 digital downloads.

== Live performances ==
Aura Dione performed the song for the first time in Denmark on late-night talk show Clement Søndag on 22 April 2012. She is set to perform the song on Danish game show Husk lige tandbørsten.

== Track listing ==
- Digital download
1. "In Love with the World" (David Jost Persson Radio Mix) – 4:11
2. "In Love with the World" (Virtual Riot Remix) – 4:55
- Digital download — iTunes Store Special Version
1. "In Love with the World" (David Jost Persson Radio Mix) – 4:11
2. "In Love with the World" (Virtual Riot Remix) – 4:55
3. "In Love with the World" (Ali Payami Remix) – 4:49
4. "In Love with the World" – 3:28

== Credits and personnel ==
- Aura Dione – songwriter
- Rick Nowels – songwriter, producer
- Devrim Karaoğlu – producer, drums, bass, effects
- Kieron Menzies – engineer, mixing
- Nigel Lundemo – engineer
- Patrick Warren – keyboards, dulcimer, string arrangement
- Kai Blankenberg – mastering

Credits adapted from Before the Dinosaurs liner notes.

== Charts and certifications ==
=== Charts ===
Chart (2012)	Peak position
Austria (Ö3 Austria Top 40)	13
Denmark (Tracklisten)	5
Germany (GfK)	52

=== Certifications ===
Region	Certification	Certified units/sales
Denmark (IFPI Danmark)	Gold	15,000^{^}
^{^} Shipments figures based on certification alone.

== Release history ==
Region	Date	Format	Label
Denmark	28 May 2012	Radio airplay	Island Records, Universal Music, Koolmusic
Austria	28 September 2012	Digital download	Island Records, Universal Music, Koolmusic
Germany	28 September 2012	Digital download	Island Records, Universal Music, Koolmusic
Switzerland	28 September 2012	Digital download	Island Records, Universal Music, Koolmusic
