= Sexy as Hell =

Studio album by Sarah Connor
- Released: 22 August 2008
- Length: 42:19
- Label: X-Cell
- Producer: Bülent Aris; Kay D.; Paul NZA; Marek Pompetzki; Remee; Thomas Troelsen; Rob Tyger

Sarah Connor chronology
Soulicious (2007)	Sexy as Hell (2008)	Real Love (2010)

Singles from Sexy as Hell
- 1. "Under My Skin" Released: 1 August 2008; 2. "I'll Kiss It Away" Released: 7 November 2008

Sexy as Hell is the seventh studio album by German singer Sarah Connor. It was released by X-Cell Records on 22 August 2008 in German-speaking Europe. Connor's first regular release of original material since her 2005 studio album Naughty but Nice, she consulted Danish producers Remee and Thomas Troelsen to work with her on Sexy as Hell. Aside from the duo, Connor also worked with duo Marek Pompetzki and Paul NZA and reteamed with as frequent contributors Rob Tyger and Kay Denar as well as Bülent Aris. Sexy as Hell has been called an "inspiration" by English singer Jack Lucien for his second studio album EuroSceptic.

== Background ==
Connor described the album as "hip pop," a play on words combining hip-hop and pop music. In an interview with Bild, she commented. "I’m constantly searching, always wanting to redefine myself and my sound. The album is a sexy mix of pop music with hip-hop and R&B elements. A seriously hot dance record, with killer riffs and heavy beats. "he songs are sugary sweet one moment and fierce the next."

== Critical reception ==
Professional ratings
Review scores
Source	Rating
CDStarts	5/10
laut.de	2/5 stars

Albert Ranner from CDStarts gave the album a 5/10 rating. He found that it "was in line with her previous pop albums: two or three songs with hit potential, a couple of decent tracks, and then plenty of filler [...] With Sexy as Hell, Connor ultimately delivers the same old average fare — this time even lacking the punch of a true hit single." Simon Müller from laut.de wrote: "Admittedly, the instrumentals of "Sexy As Hell" and "Under My Skin" are really powerful and, aside from the rather thin drum set in the title track, are also cleanly produced. However, the meaningless sex-driven lyrics—which – by the way, aren't limited to just these two songs — reduce them to standard pop fare at best." Saarbrücker Zeitung concluded: "Whether Connor is truly hellish is debatable. However, some of her songs are definitely bold and direct. If that’s your thing, you’ll have a blast with tracks like "Touch" or "See You Later." Fans of hip-hop and R&B should also be satisfied with the overall mix. But if you’re not into those styles, you might want to skip this album—there are only two ballads (though they’re quite well done)."

== Commercial performance ==
Sexy as Hell opened and peaked at number three on the German Albums Chart in the week of 5 September 2008. It was Connor's highest-charting album since Naughty but Nice (2005) as well as her seventh consecutive album to reach the chart's top ten. In Austria, Sexy as Hell debuted and peaked at number five on the Austrian Albums Chart. It would spend five further weeks on the chart. In Switzerland, the album reached number seven on the Swiss Albums Chart.

== Track listing ==
Sexy as Hell track listing
No.	Title	Writer(s)	Producer(s)	Length
1.	"Sexy as Hell"	Remee; Thomas Troelsen; Sarah Connor; O.G. Fortuna	Remee; Troelsen	3:13
2.	"Under My Skin" (T.S.O.B. Mix)	Remee; Troelsen; Connor; Lucas Secon; Fortuna	Remee; Troelsen	3:17
3.	"I Believe in You"	Remee; Troelsen; Connor; Secon; Fortuna	Remee; Troelsen	3:31
4.	"I'll Kiss It Away"	Connor; Rob Tyger; Kay Denar	Tyger; Denar	3:29
5.	"Play"	Christina Undhjem; Marek Pompetzki; Paul NZA	Pompetzki; NZA	3:19
6.	"Still Crazy in Love" (Final Part of the Osla Suite Trilogy)	Connor; Tyger; Denar	Tyger; Denar	4:27
7.	"Beautiful View"	Remee; Troelsen; Connor; Fortuna	Remee; Troelsen	3:17
8.	"Touch"	Connor; Bülent Aris; Anthony Freeman	Aris	4:09
9.	"See You Later"	Remee; Troelsen; Connor; Secon; Fortuna	Remee; Troelsen	3:27
10.	"Fall Apart"	J.R. Rotem; Evan "Kidd" Bogart; Franne Golde; Ruth-Anne Cunningham	Pompetzki; NZA	3:08
11.	"Act Like You"	Connor; Aris; Freeman	Aris	3:31
12.	"Your Love Is Dangerous"	Connor; Tyger; Denar	Tyger; Denar	3:59
Total length:				42:19

== Charts ==
=== Weekly charts ===
Weekly chart performance for Sexy as Hell
Chart (2008)	Peak position
Austrian Albums (Ö3 Austria)	8
European Top 100 Albums (Billboard)	10
German Albums (Offizielle Top 100)	3
Swiss Albums (Schweizer Hitparade)	7

=== Year-end charts ===
Year-end chart performance for Sexy as Hell
Chart (2008)	Position
German Albums (Official Top 100)	81

== Release history ==
Release dates and formats for Sexy as Hell
Region	Date	Format(s)	Label	Ref.
Austria	22 August 2008	Digital download; CD	X-Cell	
Germany	22 August 2008	Digital download; CD	X-Cell	
Switzerland	22 August 2008	Digital download; CD	X-Cell	
