= I'm on a Roll =

Single by Stefano featuring New Boyz and Rock Mafia
- Released: April 24, 2012
- Genre: Dance-pop
- Length: 3:39
- Label: Hollywood
- Songwriters: Antonina Armato; Stefano Langone; Timothy James Price; Dennis White
- Producer: Rock Mafia

"I'm on a Roll" is the first single of American singer Stefano's after being signed to Hollywood Records. This song features hip hop group New Boyz and production team Rock Mafia.

A Spanish-language version of the song, titled "Ando En Mi Rol", was also released alongside the main version.

== Background ==
In January 2012, Stefano was signed to Hollywood Records. In April, Stefano announced he would be releasing a new single. His album was to debut in September, but was eventually shelved as Langone was dropped from Hollywood Records in 2013.

== Music video ==
=== Background ===
The music video was released on May 24, 2012. It was directed by Mickey Finnegan and was filmed at the Roosevelt Hotel in Hollywood. American Idol ally Casey Abrams appears in a cameo as a homeless person.

=== Synopsis ===
The concept of the video basically follows the lyrical content of the song about luck. It starts off with Stefano waking up in bed and later on having a breakdown with his car. After steering it all the way to a vehicle service to tow away, a stranger with a Ferrari mistakes Stefano for a valet and gives him his keys. As Stefano drives away, a homeless person (Abrams) calls after him. At a traffic stop, he receives exclusive tickets to a private club where he lies down near the pool and gets later invited by a womanizer to join him being massaged by women. As Ben J from the New Boyz appears in the video to rap his solo, Stefano is seen with people who have a pillow fight in the background. Towards the end of the song, Stefano returns the car keys of the Ferrari to the stranger, who gives him a tip. With the tip, Stefano pays the vehicle service for bringing back his car only to remember that the engine of his car is still blown.

== Promotion ==
Stefano performed the single on the top 6 results show of the eleventh season of American Idol. Stefano also performed the single on Good Morning America on July 16, 2012.

== Commercial performance ==
The song debuted with sales of 20,000 for its first week.

== Release history ==
Region	Date	Format
United States	April 24, 2012	Digital download
United States	May 22, 2012	Mainstream airplay
