= The Big Bang (song) =

2010 single by Rock Mafia

Single by Rock Mafia
- Released: October 28, 2010
- Recorded: 2010
- Genre: Pop
- Length: 2:40
- Songwriter(s): Rock Mafia, Jimmy Messer
- Producer(s): Rock Mafia, Jimmy Messer

Rock Mafia singles chronology
"The Big Bang" (2010)	"Morning Sun" (2012)

"The Big Bang" is a song written, produced, and performed by Rock Mafia and Jimmy Messer. The song has been used in commercials promoting the syndication of the television series Mob Wives. The song appears on the soundtrack for EA Sports game, FIFA 12 and was re-recorded in Simlish for The Sims 3 and included in the Pets expansion. The song appeared in the 2012 film LOL, starring Miley Cyrus and Demi Moore.

A cover version by singer Katy Tiz was released in 2014 on Rock Mafia's RMR label; it has been promoted by Clear Channel pop radio stations, and by IHeartRadio.

== Music video ==
The music video for "The Big Bang" was filmed on June 10, 2010, and released on November 1, 2010. It features Miley Cyrus and Kevin Zegers. Billboard.com said the video was "the latest stop on Miley Cyrus's path to prove that she's a fully grown woman and ensure that she is never called Hannah Montana again." Kevin is working, remembering his girlfriend, when Miley drives by. The video then shows how their relationship progresses, ending with them getting into a car crash. He realizes that his girlfriend only appeared as a ghost.

== Possible film adaptation ==
In November 2010, MTV reported that Rock Mafia's Tim James had stated that a film adaptation of the music video was being planned. On January 11, 2011, E! News confirmed that Cyrus' mother, Tish Cyrus had been meeting with Suzanne Todd (who has worked on films such as Memento, the 2010 adaptation of Alice in Wonderland, and the Austin Powers films) to discuss the music video being created into a feature film with Cyrus to star. MTV reported that Zegers had not yet showed his intention to join the project.

== Charts ==
Chart (2010)	Peak position
New Zealand Singles Chart	16
US Billboard Hot 100	98
US Billboard Heatseekers Songs	7

== Certifications ==
Region	Certification	Certified units/sales
United States (RIAA)	Platinum	1,000,000^{‡}
^{‡} Sales+streaming figures based on certification alone.

== Katy Tiz version ==
"The Big Bang"

Single by Katy Tiz
- Released: April 22, 2014
- Recorded: 2014
- Genre: Pop
- Length: 2:39
- Label: Rock Mafia, Atlantic
- Songwriter(s): Rock Mafia
- Producer(s): Rock Mafia

Katy Tiz singles chronology
"Red Cup" (2013)	"The Big Bang" (2014)	"Whistle (While You Work It)" (2015)

"The Big Bang" was covered by British recording artist Katy Tiz and was released onto digital outlets on April 22, 2014. This version was featured in a trailer for The Wedding Ringer. and this version also used as an intro for the first game of Subway Series at Yankee Stadium on YES Network. Shortly after Tiz had landed a record deal with Atlantic Records, the label released an official audio of "The Big Bang" on their YouTube channel. Several weeks later the audio video had received over a million views.

On July 3, 2014, Tiz released an official music video for her cover of "The Big Bang" onto YouTube.

=== Charts ===
Chart (2014)	Peak position
US Pop Songs	26
US Billboard Hot 100	100
US Billboard Heatseekers Songs	11
