= Following the Sun (Super-Hi and Neeka song) =

2020 single by SUPER-Hi and Neeka

Single by Super-Hi and Neeka
- Released: 2 October 2020
- Genre: Indie pop • dance-pop
- Length: 3:25
- Label: Blended
- Songwriters: George Tizzard; Katy Tizzard; Negin Djafari; Rick Parkhouse
- Producer: Super-Hi

Super-Hi singles chronology
"Following the Sun" (2020)	"Take Me to the Sunshine" (2022)

Neeka singles chronology
"Following the Sun" (2020)

Music video
- "Following the Sun" on YouTube

"Following the Sun" is a song by the British production team Red Triangle, under their Super-Hi band name, and Neeka, a duo featuring Katy Tiz, the sister of Red Triangle's George Tizzard.

The song was originally released on 2 October 2020, with remixes released across 2021. Neeka said "We wrote 'Following the Sun' with one ambition: to make people happy. If we can bring some light and positivity to the world right now, then we have succeeded."

== Track listing ==
Digital download / streaming
No.	Title	Length
1.	"Following the Sun"	3:25

Digital download / streaming – acoustic version
No.	Title	Length
1.	"Following the Sun" (acoustic)	3:37

Digital download / streaming – Monte Fino remix
No.	Title	Length
1.	"Following the Sun" (Monte Fino remix)	3:13

Digital download / streaming – Diego Druck remix
No.	Title	Length
1.	"Following the Sun" (Diego Druck remix)	3:39

Digital download / streaming – remixes EP
No.	Title	Length
1.	"Following the Sun"	3:25
2.	"Following the Sun" (Diego Druck remix)	3:39
3.	"Following the Sun" (Monte Fino remix)	3:13
4.	"Following the Sun" (Supermini Marimba remix)	3:49
5.	"Following the Sun" (Choomba remix)	3:20
6.	"Following the Sun" (Nick Peters remix)	3:11
7.	"Following the Sun" (Monte Fino dub)	3:09
8.	"Following the Sun" (instrumental)	3:28
9.	"Following the Sun" (acoustic)	3:37
10.	"Following the Sun" (Day one demo)	3:23

== Music video ==
A music video was released in mid-2022. It depicts two female friends travelling in an open-topped car. Their adventures includes walking through a forest and jumping into the Mediterranean Sea. The final scene depicts them watching the sunset while covering their feet with sand pebbles.

== Personnel ==
Super-Hi

- George Tizzard and Rick Parkhouse

Neeka

- Negin Djafari and Katy Tizzard

== Charts ==
=== Weekly charts ===
Weekly chart performance for "Following the Sun"
Chart (2021–2025)	Peak position
Australia (ARIA)	18
Austria (Ö3 Austria Top 40)	12
Estonia Airplay (TopHit)	58
Germany (GfK)	24
New Zealand Hot Singles (RMNZ)	9

=== Monthly charts ===
Monthly chart performance for "Following the Sun"
Chart (2024)	Peak position
Estonia Airplay (TopHit)	70

=== Year-end charts ===
2022 year-end chart performance for "Following the Sun"
Chart (2022)	Position
Australia (ARIA)	47

2024 year-end chart performance for "Following the Sun"
Chart (2024)	Position
Estonia Airplay (TopHit)	90

== Certifications ==
Region	Certification	Certified units/sales
France (SNEP)	Platinum	200,000^{‡}
New Zealand (RMNZ)	2× Platinum	60,000^{‡}
United Kingdom (BPI)	Silver	200,000^{‡}
^{‡} Sales+streaming figures based on certification alone.

== Other versions ==
In 2026, the Indian singer Madhubanti Bagchi released "Banjaare (Following the Sun)", a Hindi-language reimagining of "Following the Sun" which retains the original English chorus.
