= Fragments from a Space Cadet =

Fragments From A Space Cadet

Studio album by Kenneth Bager
- Released: May 24, 2006
- Genre: Downtempo, Chillout, Electronic, Dub, Pop
- Label: Shhh! Music/VME
- Producer: Kenneth Bager

Professional ratings
Review scores
Source	Rating
Gaffa	4/6 stars

Fragments From A Space Cadet is the debut album by Kenneth Bager for which he received the Statens Kunstfond's (The Danish Arts Foundation's) award. It was released on May 24, 2006.

== Track listing ==
1. "Fragment Six" (Speak my name) ft. Camilla Munck
2. "Fragment Zero" (And I kept dubbin')
3. "Fragment One" (And I kept Hearing) ft. Gisli
4. "Fragment Two" (The First Picture) ft. Julee Cruise
5. "Fragment Eight" (The Sound of Swing) ft. The Hellerup Cool School Choir
6. "Fragment Five" (Moonlight Talking) ft. Camilla Munck
7. "Fragment Seven" (Les Fleurs) ft. Julee Cruise
8. "Fragment Three" (Walther & Viola)
9. "Fragment Ten" (On the floor — dub) ft. Julee Cruise
10. "Fragment Four" (Love won't leave me alone) ft. Nikolaj Grandjean & Jean Luc Ponty
11. "Fragment Nine" (Would you like to seduce me?)
12. "Fragment Eleven" (The day after yesterday - a love story in five parts)
  1. Part 1: The Meeting
  2. Part 2: Traveling
  3. Part 3: The story ft. Julee Cruise
  4. Part 4: Reflections
  5. Part 5: It'll never happen again ft. Julee Cruise & Syd Matters
