= Rock Mafia =

American record production/songwriting duo

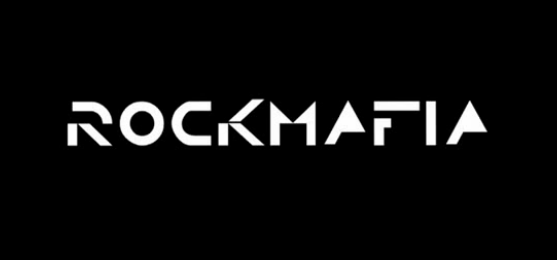
- Rock Mafia's logo

Background information
- Origin: Los Angeles, California
- Genres: R&B; pop; pop rock
- Occupations: Record producers; songwriters
- Years active: 2000–present
- Members: Antonina Armato; Tim James

Rock Mafia is an American record production team, consisting of Tim James and Antonina Armato who have been active since the early 2000s. They have written and produced 38 top ten singles, and have sold over 50 million records worldwide. They have worked with artists such as Brit Smith, Eminem, Marshmello, Quavo, Diplo, Illenium, Zedd, Gwen Stefani, Young Thug, Tiesto, No Doubt, Wyclef Jean, Green Day, Mariah Carey, Justin Bieber, Hoku, Flo Rida, Ellie Goulding, Aura Dione, Tokio Hotel, Bebe Rexha, and Armin van Buuren. In the 2000s, they worked extensively with Disney stars signed to Hollywood Records, mainly Miley Cyrus, Vanessa Hudgens, Demi Lovato, and Selena Gomez.

Aside from their production work, the duo have released one mixtape and a string of singles, most notably "The Big Bang" and "Morning Sun" featuring Miley Cyrus.

== Career ==
In 2008, Rock Mafia's remix of Miley Cyrus' "See You Again" was released as a single. late 2010, Rock Mafia released a song featuring James' own vocals entitled "The Big Bang". The song was used as the theme song for the VH1 reality show Mob Wives. "The Big Bang" music video featured Miley Cyrus and Kevin Zegers and currently has more than 41.2 million views on YouTube. Rock Mafia were reportedly in talks with potential writers and producers to bring the music video for "The Big Bang" to the big screens as a feature film, with Armato revealing on her Twitter that she had been meeting with Tish Cyrus (Miley Cyrus' mother) and Jennifer Todd (producer of Alice in Wonderland and Memento) to work on creating the movie. "The Big Bang" is featured on the video game FIFA 12, which launched in September 2011, and their song "Fly or Die" is part of the soundtrack in FIFA 13. Their song "I Am" featuring Wyclef Jean, Bill Kaulitz and David Correy featured as soundtrack on EA Sports game, FIFA 14.

Rock Mafia scored a hit in Europe with Aura Dione's hit single "Friends," a song written and produced together with David Jost. A clip showing Miley Cyrus recording vocals over the "Pimps and Hos" track, which has now been renamed "Morning Sun" and has been posted online.

== Discography ==
=== Mixtapes ===
List of albums
Title	Album details
Mixtape Vol. 1	Released: 4 March 2012; Format: CD, digital download; Label: Self-release

=== Singles ===
==== As lead artist ====
Title	Year	Peak chart positions		Certifications	Album
Title	Year	US	US Heat	Certifications	Album
"The Big Bang"	2010	91	7	RIAA: Platinum	Mixtape Vol. 1
"Morning Sun" (featuring Miley Cyrus)	2012	—	—		Mixtape Vol. 1
"Fly or Die"	2012	—	—		Mixtape Vol. 1
"I Am" (featuring Wyclef Jean, Tokio Hotel, David Correy)	2014	—	—		FIFA 14
"Good Life" (featuring Lauriana Mae)	2014	—	—		Non-album single
"Miles to Your Heart" (with Sultan & Shepard and Bahari)	2019	—	—		Echoes of Life: Day
"Crazy Times" (with Illenium and Said The Sky)	2021	—	—		Fallen Embers

==== As featured artist ====
List of singles as featured artist, with selected chart positions and certifications, showing year released and album name
Title	Year	Peak chart positions			Certifications	Album
Title	Year	AUT	GER	POL	Certifications	Album
"I'm on a Roll" (Stefano Langone featuring New Boyz & Rock Mafia)	2012	—	—	—		Non-album single
"Friends" (Aura Dione featuring Rock Mafia)	2012	3	4	1	DEN: Gold; AUT: Gold; GER: Gold; SWI: Gold	Before the Dinosaurs
"Hands to Heaven" (Armin Van Buuren featuring Rock Mafia)	2015	—	—	—		Embrace

== Selected production discography ==
=== Hannah Montana soundtrack ===
==== Hannah Montana ====
- "If We Were a Movie"
- "I Got Nerve"

==== Hannah Montana 2 ====
- "Bigger Than Us"

==== Hannah Montana 3 ====
- "It’s All Right Here"

=== Miley Cyrus ===
==== Meet Miley Cyrus ====
- "See You Again"
- "East Northumberland High"
- "Let’s Dance"
- "Right Here"
- "Clear"
- "Good and Broken"

==== Breakout ====
- "7 Things"
- "Fly on the Wall"
- "Bottom of the Ocean"
- "Wake Up America"
- "Simple Song"
- "Goodbye"

==== Can't Be Tamed ====
- "Liberty Walk"
- "Who Owns My Heart"
- "Can't Be Tamed"
- "Every Rose Has Its Thorn"
- "Two More Lonely People"
- "Forgiveness and Love"

=== Selena Gomez ===
==== Kiss & Tell ====
- "Naturally"
- "Tell Me Something I Don't Know (Remix)"

==== A Year Without Rain ====
- "Rock God"
- "Off the Chain"
- "Summer's Not Hot"

==== When the Sun Goes Down ====
- "Love You like a Love Song"
- "My Dilemma"
- "Outlaw"

==== Stars Dance ====
- "Stars Dance"
- "Love Will Remember"

==== For You ====
- "The Heart Wants What It Wants"
- "Do It"
- "My Dilemma 2.0"

==== Revival ====
- "Revival"
- "Kill Em with Kindness"
- "Body Heat"
- "Rise"
- "Me & My Girls"
- "Outta My Hands (Loco)"

=== Demi Lovato ===
==== Sonny with a Chance soundtrack ====
- "Me, Myself and Time"

==== Unbroken ====
- "You’re My Only Shorty"

=== Sick Puppies ===
Dressed Up as Life

Tri-Polar

Live & Unplugged

Polar Opposite

Connect

=== Aly & AJ ===
==== Into the Rush ====
- "Chemicals React"
- "Shine"
- "Never Far Behind"
- "Something More"
- "Collapsed"
- "Sticks and Stones"
- "Slow Down"

==== Acoustic Hearts of Winter ====
- "Greatest Time of Year"
- "Not This Year"

==== Insomniatic ====
- "Potential Breakup Song"
- "Bullseye"
- "Closure"
- "Division"
- "Like It or Leave It"
- "Like Whoa"
- "Flattery"
- "I'm Here"

=== Vanessa Hudgens ===
==== V ====
- "Come Back to Me"
- "Don't Talk"
- "Too Emotional"

==== Identified ====
- "Hook It Up"
- "Don’t Leave"
- "Vulnerable"
- "Committed"

=== Shake it Up soundtrack ===
==== Shake It Up: Break It Down ====
- Chris Trousdale and Nevermind — "Not Too Young"
- Tim James and Nevermind — "Twist My Hips"
- Anna Margaret and Nevermind — "All Electric"

==== Shake It Up: Live 2 Dance ====
- TKO & Nevermind — "Critical"
- TKO, Nevermind & SOS — "Surprise"
- Nevermind & SOS — "Total Access"
- Caroline Sunshine — "The Star I R"

==== Shake It Up: I Love Dance ====
- Y.LA — "I Can Do Better"
- TKO & Nevermind — "Law of Averages"

=== Britney Spears ===
==== Glory ====
- "Exaholic or Sexaholic"
