= Aura Dione =

Danish singer and songwriter (born 1985)

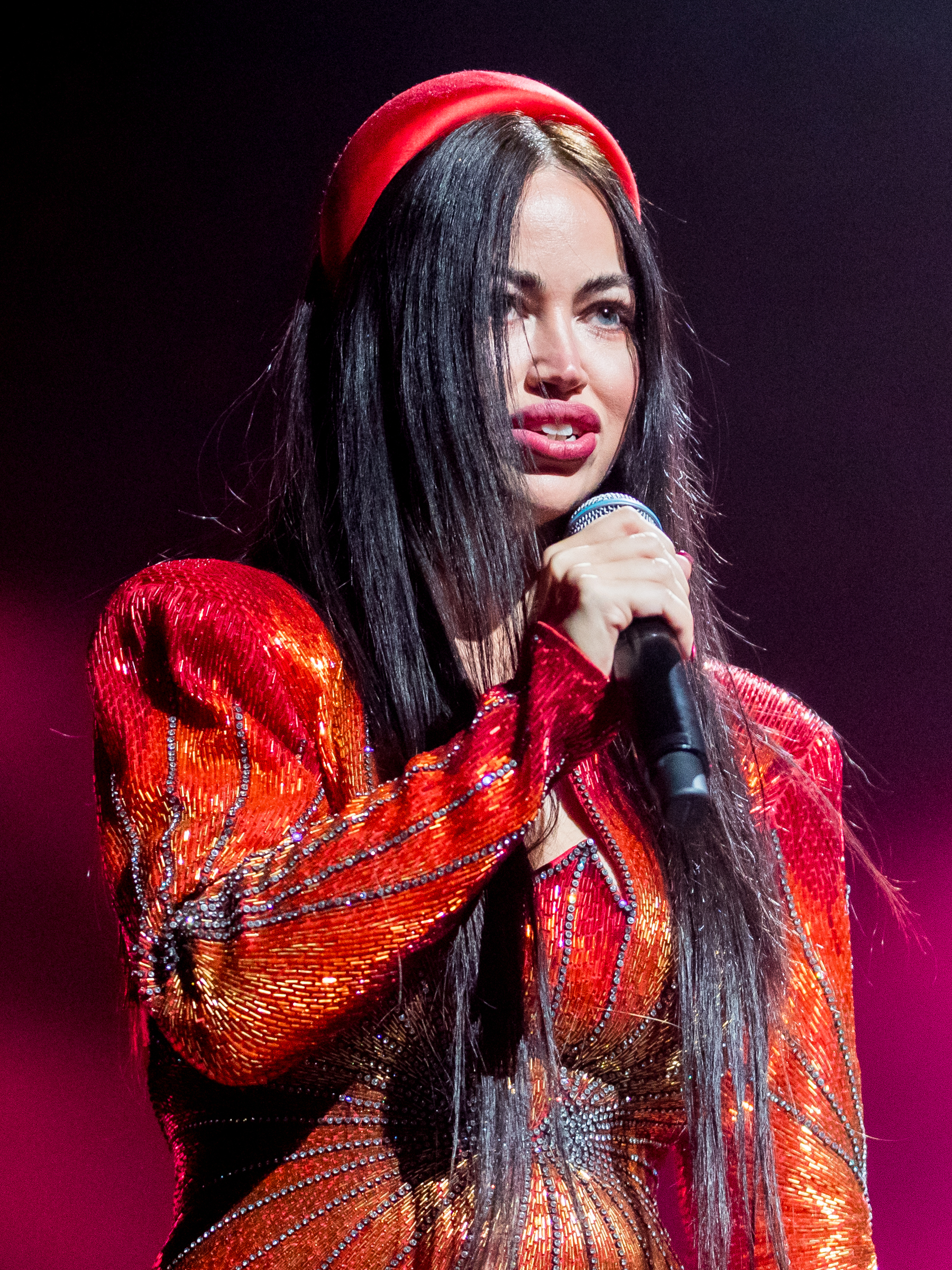
- Aura Dione in 2023

Background information
- Born: Maria Louise Joensen; 21 January 1985 (age 41); Copenhagen, Denmark
- Origin: Bornholm, Denmark
- Genres: Pop; folk; country pop
- Occupations: Singer; songwriter
- Instruments: Vocals; guitar
- Years active: 2007–present
- Labels: Mermaid Records; Music for Dreams; Island; Universal; Columbia; Sony
- Website: aura-dione.com

Maria Louise Joensen (Danish pronunciation: [jœːnsn̩]; born 21 January 1985), known as Aura Dione, is a Danish singer and songwriter. In 2008, she released her debut album, Columbine. The album spawned the hit single "I Will Love You Monday (365)", which reached number one in Germany, achieved over 80 million video views and was certified platinum.

After winning the European Border Breaker Award in 2011, Dione won Best Female Artist and Hit of the Year for "Geronimo" at the Danish Music Awards 2012 and Female Artist of the Year in 2013; she is one of Denmark's top two female recording artists.

== Life and career ==
=== Early life ===
Aura Dione was born Maria Joensen on 21 January 1985 in Copenhagen, Denmark. Her mother is of Faroese and French descent, while her father is of Danish and Spanish descent. Her parents introduced her to music, and she began writing songs at the age of eight. Her parents were hippies who with Aura as a child sailed all the world's oceans, until the 7-year-old was given residence on Bornholm. Here, she began her formal schooling and as a teenager enrolled in Secondary school, but in the middle of her education she chose to move to Australia where she sought inspiration from the Aborigines. This later resulted in a song "Something From Nothing".

=== 2007–2010: Columbine and international breakthrough ===
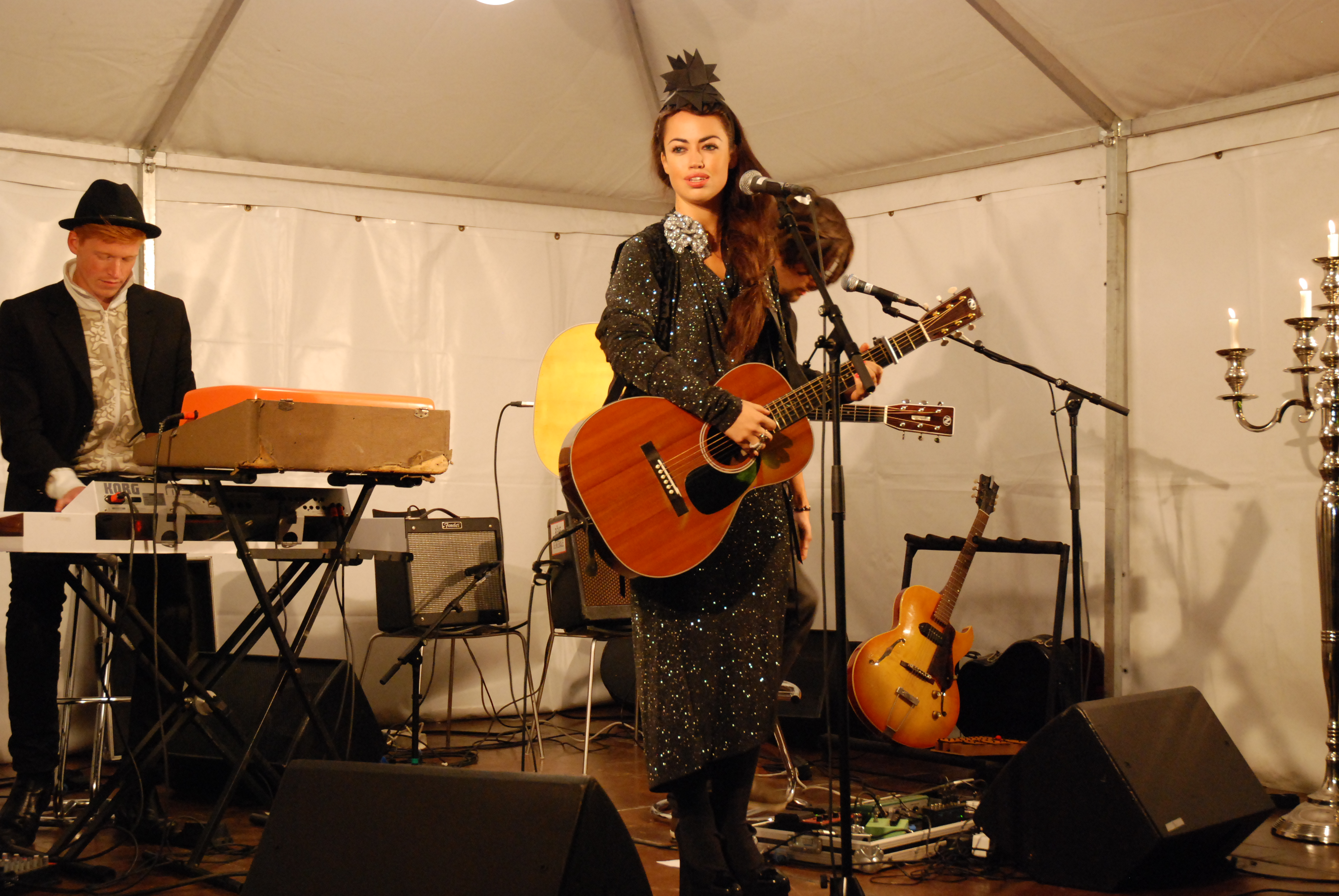
Dione with her band in 2009

Dione debuted in summer 2007 with the single "Something From Nothing", but has also gained success with the track "Song for Sophie" - both from her album Columbine, which was released in 2008. The single "I Will Love You Monday" was a No.1 hit in Europe, where it was issued in an expanded version titled "I Will Love You Monday (365)".

=== 2011–2015: Before the Dinosaurs ===
Dione released her second international studio album Before the Dinosaurs on 4 November 2011. The first single release "Geronimo" was produced by David Jost and went straight to the #1 in the official German Media Control Charts. In the very same year, Aura Dione won a European Border Breakers Award for her international breakthrough. Aura Dione recently released the second single "Friends" of her international hit album Before the Dinosaurs. The song is written and produced by Dione, David Jost and Rock Mafia and reached the official German Radio Charts #1. "Friends" is Dione's third Radio #1 single.

=== 2024: Dansk Melodi Grand Prix ===
Dione was one of the contestants of Dansk Melodi Grand Prix 2024, the Danish national final for the Eurovision Song Contest 2024, with the song "Mirrorball of Hope".

== Personal life ==
Dione was engaged to Danish billionaire Janus Friis but the couple split up in April 2015. In 2023, she gave birth to her first child.

== Discography ==
=== Albums ===
| Title | Album details | Peak chart positions | | | | | Certifications | Sales |
| Title | Album details | DEN | AUT | GER | GRE | SWI | Certifications | Sales |
|---|---|---|---|---|---|---|---|---|
| Columbine | Released: 28 January 2008; Label: Music for Dreams; Formats: CD, digital download | 3 | 31 | 44 | 46 | 30 | IFPI DEN: Gold | WW: 100,000 (Note: Worldwide sales of Columbine as of November 2011.); DEN: 20,000 (Note: Sales of Columbine in Denmark as of November 2011.) |
| Before the Dinosaurs | Released: 4 November 2011; Label: Island, Universal, Koolmusic; Formats: CD, digital download | 6 | 30 | 14 | — | 36 | IFPI DEN: Platinum; IFPI AUT: Gold | |
| Can't Steal the Music | Released: 19 May 2017; Label: Island, Universal, Koolmusic; Formats: CD, digital download | — | — | — | — | — | | |
| Life of a Rainbow | Released: 26 August 2022; Label: Mermaid Records; Formats: CD, digital download | — | — | — | — | — | | |
"—" denotes a title that did not chart, or was not released in that territory.

=== Extended plays ===
| Title | Details |
|---|---|
| Fearless Lovers | Released: 27 March 2020; Label: Warner Music Group, Queen of Hearts; Format: Digital download |

=== Singles ===
List of singles as lead artist, with selected chart positions and certifications
| Title | Year | Peak chart positions | | | | | | | | | | Certifications | Album |
| Title | Year | DEN | AUT | CZR | EUR | FRA | GER | NLD | POL | SVK | SWI | Certifications | Album |
|---|---|---|---|---|---|---|---|---|---|---|---|---|---|
| "Something from Nothing" | 2007 | 7 | — | — | — | — | 90 | — | — | — | — | IFPI DEN: Gold | Columbine |
| "Song for Sophie" | 2008 | 16 | 18 | — | 49 | — | 12 | — | — | 83 | 68 | IFPI DEN: Gold | Columbine |
| "I Will Love You Monday" | 2008 | 20 | 2 | 11 | 8 | — | 1 | 58 | 3 | 14 | 2 | IFPI AUT: Platinum; BVMI: Platinum; IFPI SWI: Platinum | Columbine |
| "Stay the Same" | 2008 | — | — | — | — | — | — | — | — | — | — | | Columbine |
| "Geronimo" | 2011 | 1 | 1 | 40 | — | 95 | 1 | — | — | 17 | 7 | IFPI DEN: 2× Platinum; IFPI AUT: Gold; BVMI: Platinum; IFPI SWI: Gold | Before the Dinosaurs |
| "Friends" (featuring Rock Mafia) | 2012 | 6 | 3 | 7 | — | — | 4 | — | 1 | 24 | 10 | IFPI DEN: Platinum; IFPI AUT: Gold; BVMI: Gold; IFPI SWI: Gold | Before the Dinosaurs |
| "In Love with the World" | 2012 | 5 | 13 | — | — | — | 52 | — | — | — | — | IFPI DEN: Platinum | Before the Dinosaurs |
| "Reconnect" | 2012 | — | — | — | — | — | — | — | — | — | — | | Before the Dinosaurs |
| "Love Somebody" | 2016 | 27 | — | — | — | — | — | — | — | — | — | IFPI DEN: Gold | Can't Steal the Music |
| "Indian Giver" | 2016 | — | — | — | — | — | — | — | — | — | — | | Can't Steal the Music |
| "Can't Steal the Music" | 2017 | — | — | — | — | — | — | — | — | — | — | | Can't Steal the Music |
| "King of Pain" | 2017 | — | — | — | — | — | — | — | — | — | — | | Can't Steal the Music |
| "Shania Twain" | 2019 | — | — | — | — | — | — | — | — | — | — | | Fearless Lovers |
| "Last Man in the World" | 2019 | — | — | — | — | — | — | — | — | — | — | | Fearless Lovers |
| "Sunshine" | 2019 | — | — | — | — | — | — | — | — | — | — | | Fearless Lovers |
| "Colorblind" | 2020 | — | — | — | — | — | — | — | — | — | — | | Fearless Lovers |
| "Worn Out American Dream" | 2021 | — | — | — | — | — | — | — | — | — | — | | Non-album single |
| "Marry Me" | 2022 | — | — | — | — | — | — | — | — | — | — | | Life of a Rainbow |
| "Mirrorball Of Hope" | 2024 | — | — | — | — | — | — | — | — | — | — | | Melodi Grand Prix 2024 |
| "Where Does Love Go" | 2024 | — | — | — | — | — | — | — | — | — | — | | Non-album single |
"—" denotes a title that did not chart, or was not released in that territory.

=== Featured singles ===
List of singles as featured artist
| Title | Year | Album |
|---|---|---|
| "Breathe" (Da French Connexion featuring Aura Dione) | 2013 | Non-album single |

=== Promotional singles ===
List of promotional singles
| Title | Year | Album |
|---|---|---|
| "I'm Only Here for a Moment" | 2009 | Non-album singles |
| "Tomboy" | 2014 | Non-album singles |
| "Til En Veninde" | 2019 | Non-album singles |
| "In Love with the World (Pure Version)" | 2022 | Life of a Rainbow |
| "Glass Bone Crash (Pure Version)" | 2022 | Life of a Rainbow |
| "You Got Wings (Pure Version)" | 2022 | Life of a Rainbow |

== Awards and recognition ==
Danish Music Awards

| Year | Nominee / work | Award | Result |
|---|---|---|---|
| 2009 | Columbine | Årets Danske Pop Udgivelse | Won |
| 2009 | Herself | Årets Danske Kvindelige Kunstner | Won |
| 2012 | Herself | Årets Danske Kvindelige Kunstner | Won |
| 2012 | Herself | Årets Publikumpris | Nominated |
| 2012 | Herself | Ærespris | Nominated |
| 2012 | Before the Dinosaurs | Årets Danske Pop Udgivelse | Nominated |
| 2012 | "Geronimo" | Årets Danske Hit | Won |

GAFFA Awards

| Year | Nominee / work | Award | Result | Ref. |
|---|---|---|---|---|
| 2021 | Herself | Best Danish Solo Act | Nominated | |
| 2021 | Fearless Lovers | Best Danish Pop Album | Nominated | |

MTV Europe Music Awards

| Year | Nominee / work | Award | Result |
|---|---|---|---|
| 2012 | Herself | Best Danish Act | Nominated |
