= David Jost =

- Born: August 12, 1972 (age 54); Hamburg, West Germany
- Genres: Pop, rock, dance, electronic
- Occupations: Music producer, singer, songwriter, DJ
- Website: davidjost.com

David Jost (born August 12, 1972 in Hamburg) is a German music producer, singer, songwriter, and DJ. His career has a track record of 74 platinum, 108 gold records, and 14 No. 1 hits. He has worked with artists such as Lady Gaga, Chris Brown, Tokio Hotel, Limp Bizkit, Selena Gomez, Nelly Furtado, Keri Hilson, Aura Dione, and Adam Lambert. For his work as a songwriter, Jost was named Germany's best songwriter (rock & pop) by the GEMA (the German equivalent to the ASCAP/BMI). For the band Tokio Hotel, Jost has written, produced, and mixed six No. 1 singles and three No. 1 albums.

Even though Jost managed several careers as a big media artist, he rarely answers interviews for the press and is known for principally never giving TV interviews. Jost has been working in Los Angeles as of 2012.

== Early life ==
At the age of 12, Jost started breakdancing, DJing, and painting graffiti. In the 1990s, he worked in collaboration with several German musicians, such as Franz Plasa, Michel Van Dyke, Stefan Knoess, and Andreas Herbig, on several projects like Neil Hickethier's Glass, Bed and Breakfast, and Ian O'Brien-Docker ("Totally Alright").

Together with Dave Roth, Jost produced remixes for Faith Hill, the Doors, the Corrs, Mötley Crüe, and Jewel. Furthermore, Jost and Roth wrote the song "Undone" performed by Swiss singer Patrick Nuo, as well as the song "Joyride" used for a TV commercial of the German beer brand Veltins.

== Career ==
=== Songwriter, producer and remixer ===
Jost wrote Selena Gomez's song "Love Will Remember", which reached No. 1 of the American Billboard charts in August 2013. Jost wrote the song together with his production partners Rock Mafia and Gomez herself. Jost continued collaborating with Rock Mafia, co-writing Gomez's song "Love Will Remember" for her 2013 release Stars Dance. For Chris Brown, Jost wrote and co-produced the song "Nobody's Perfect" which is featured on Brown's album X. He co-wrote and co-produced the song "Summertrain" from Greyson Chance's album Hold On 'til the Night.

Together with Neue Deutsche Welle artists Inga Humpe and Tommi Eckart, Jost wrote and produced "Bei dir bin ich schön", which became the lead single of indie-electro band 2Raumwohnung's following album. Jost also co-wrote two more songs off their Achtung fertig album ("Ein neues Gefuhl" and "Bye Bye Bye"). Jost co-wrote "Wenn du liebst" for Adel Tawil's first solo album Lieder, released in 2013. Jost is credited co-writer on Marlon Roudette's song "Hearts Pull" from Roudette's 2014 album Electric Soul. For Keri Hilson, Jost composed and produced the hit single "I Like", which became Hilson's first No. 1 hit in Germany. For Lady Gaga, he produced the "Born This Way (Jost & Naaf Remix)", which was included as the only remix on the international version of Gaga's album Born This Way.

In 2011, Jost produced a radio mix of Lady Gaga's single "Marry the Night (David Jost Twin Radio Mix)". Shortly after, he produced a remix for Limp Bizkit's single "Shotgun". He composed, produced and mixed the hit single "Geronimo" with Aura Dione and Joacim Persson; the song reached the No. 1 in the radio charts for several weeks. Dione's second single "Friends" from her album Before the Dinosaurs was written by Jost and Dione, and produced by Jost and Rock Mafia; the single reached the official German radio charts No. 1. Heidi Klum selected Jost's composition "Girls Beautiful" as the title song for the sixth season of Germany's Next Topmodel.

Together with Tokio Hotel's lead singer Bill Kaulitz, Jost composed the single "Monsoon", as well as producing and mixing it. "Monsoon" was awarded multiple times worldwide, including winning "Best Song of the Year" at the 2008 MTV Video Music Awards Latinoamérica. Jost produced five more No. 1 singles by Tokio Hotel, as well as Tokio Hotel's No. 1 album Scream, and two more No. 1 platinum-awarded international albums for the band.

=== Soundtracks ===
Jost also contributed songs for film soundtracks. The song "Strange", co-written by Jost and performed by Tokio Hotel and Kerli, was included on the album Almost Alice, a concept album of various artists' music inspired by Tim Burton's film Alice in Wonderland. He also co-wrote the song "By Your Side" which was featured on the soundtrack of the film Prom Night. The song "I Like", sung by Keri Hilson and co-written by Jost, became the title song of Til Schweiger's feature film Zweiohrküken. The song "Half a Dream Away" performed by Blind was used in the soundtrack of the German film Gangs (2009). For the German film Break Up Man by Matthias Schweighöfer, Jost co-wrote the title song Hurt Lovers for the British band Blue. Jost also composed music for TV campaigns of various brands including BMW, Mercedes, Veltins and Verizon/Motorola. His composition "Human Connect to Human" was selected for Verizon's US campaign to introduce their Motorola Droid phone.
