= Kenneth Bager =

Danish musician and record producer

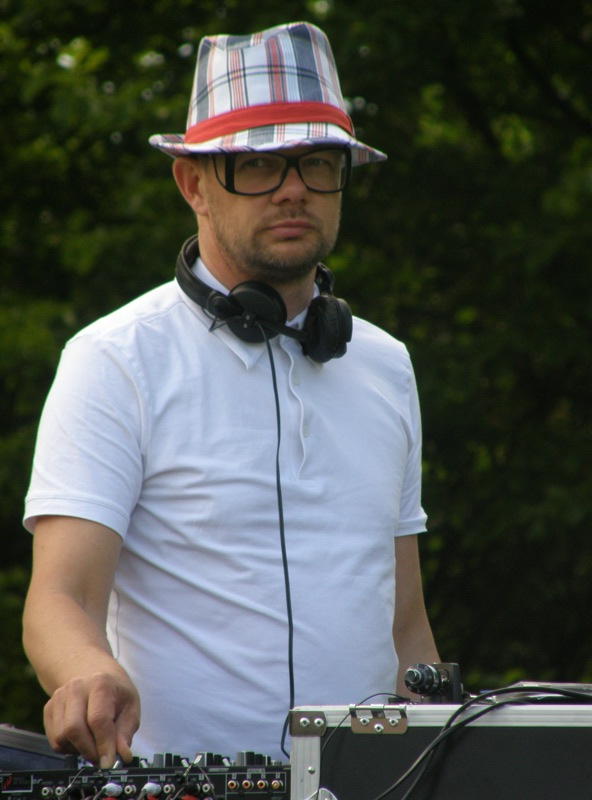

Background information
- Born: Kenneth Bager; 6 March 1962 (age 64)
- Origin: Denmark
- Genres: Downtempo, chillout, electronic, dub, pop
- Occupations: Musician, record producer, DJ
- Years active: Late 1980s–present
- Label: Music for Dreams
- Website: www.kennethbager.dk

Kenneth Bager (born 6 March 1962) is a Danish musician and record producer.

== History ==
Bager started his musical career back in the mid-1980s as a DJ. In 1994, he released a compilation called Music for Dreams featuring, among others, Peter Gabriel and Michael Nyman. Bager received his breakthrough with the release of his critically acclaimed debut album Fragments from a Space Cadet in 2006, for which he received the Danish Statens Kunstfond award. In 2007, Bager was amongst the performers at the annual Roskilde Festival. From 2010 onwards, he released his work under the moniker "The Kenneth Bager Experience".

== Discography ==
- 1994 - Music for Dreams
- 2006 - Fragments from a Space Cadet
- 2010 - Fragments from a Space Cadet 2
- 2010 - Naked Music Remix EP (5 different versions)
- 2010 - Fragment 14 - Naked Music Remix EP (incl. remixes by Peter Zohdy, Kottarashky and others)
- 2010 - I Can't Wait Remix EP #1
- 2010 - I Can't Wait Remix EP #2
- 2011 - The Sound of Swing (Oh Na Na)
- 2012 - The Sound Of...
