= Mike Castonguay =

American musician

- Also known as: Lukewarm Freeda
- Genres: Pop rock, rock, acoustic
- Occupation(s): Music producer, music engineer, music mixer, songwriter, musician
- Instrument(s): Vocals, bass, guitar, keyboards
- Years active: 2000–present
- Labels: Sony/BMG, Transcontinental, Sire/Warner Bros.
- Website: imaginationsurplus.com

Mike Castonguay is a music producer, musician and songwriter based in Los Angeles, California.

From 2001 to 2004 Mike worked as a producer, songwriter and musical director for Natural (Sony/BMG), an Orlando, Florida–based band led by the boy band mogul Lou Pearlman. Mike produced numerous songs for the band's two albums Keep It Natural and It's Only Natural. He also produced and co-wrote two singles for the band, "Paradise" and "Let Me Just Fly". The song "Paradise" was featured in the German trailer for the Academy Award Winning film Spirited Away (Disney). He also produced Natural's version of the song Cherish for the Kool & The Gang tribute album The Hits: Reloaded.

In 2005, Mike and former Natural member Michael Johnson formed the band Lukewarm Freeda. Mike was the lead singer and the guitarist for the band.

In 2006, Mike played bass in the band In For The Kill featuring Bill Gaal from the band Nothingface.

From 2006 to 2009 Mike played bass for Evan Taubenfeld as a member of his band The Blacklist Club (Sire/Warner Bros.). The band also featured Devin Bronson and Isaac Carpenter. Mike played bass on Evan's debut album Welcome to the Blacklist Club which also featured Avril Lavigne. Songs from the album appeared on MTV's The Hills, as well as The Sims 3 video game.

Separate from the band, Mike and Evan wrote and produced the theme song for the MTV show Pageant Place which was executive produced by Donald Trump. They also worked together on the MTV show Kaya, the film Lock and Roll Forever (Sony Pictures), the Tyga album No Introduction (Universal), and the Cartoon Network show Props.

Mike has produced and composed music in commercials for Apple, Sprint, VISA and Hidden Valley Ranch while working for the music house Mophonics, in Venice, California. While at Mophonics, he was also an engineer and musician for the film Bella (Lion's Gate).

Mike has also produced and/or written songs featured on The Originals, Pawn Stars, The Real World, Friday Night Lights, NY Ink', The Clockwork Girl, Jane By Design, Last Call with Carson Daly, Best Week Ever', Counting Cars, Tosh.0, Veronica Mars, I'm Through With White Girls and CMT Hot 20 Countdown.

In 2012, Mike produced the vocals and mixed the Season 2 theme song for the TV Land sitcom The Exes.

Mike has also worked with Fastball, Stephen Bishop, Sarah Connor, Kay Hanley, Liberty DeVitto, W. G. Snuffy Walden, Barry Goudreau, Rich Cronin, Robert Carranza, Phil X, Marc Terenzi, Capra, Kelly Blatz, Sacha Sacket, TL Forsberg and many others.
