= Dirty pop =

Dirty pop may refer to:

- Dirty Pop, a music duo consisting of Drew G. and Brian Cua
- Dirty Pop with Lance Bass, a radio show featuring NSYNC's Lance Bass
- Dirty Pop: The Boy Band Scam, a documentary film series about Lou Pearlman
- a lyric in the NSYNC song "Pop"

== See also ==
- Dirty Pop-Up, a limited run shop from NSYNC
- Dirty Pop Fantasy album by Regurgitator
- Dirty rap, a subgenre of hip hop music
