= Sonnets from the Portuguese =

1850 sonnet collection by Elizabeth Barrett Browning

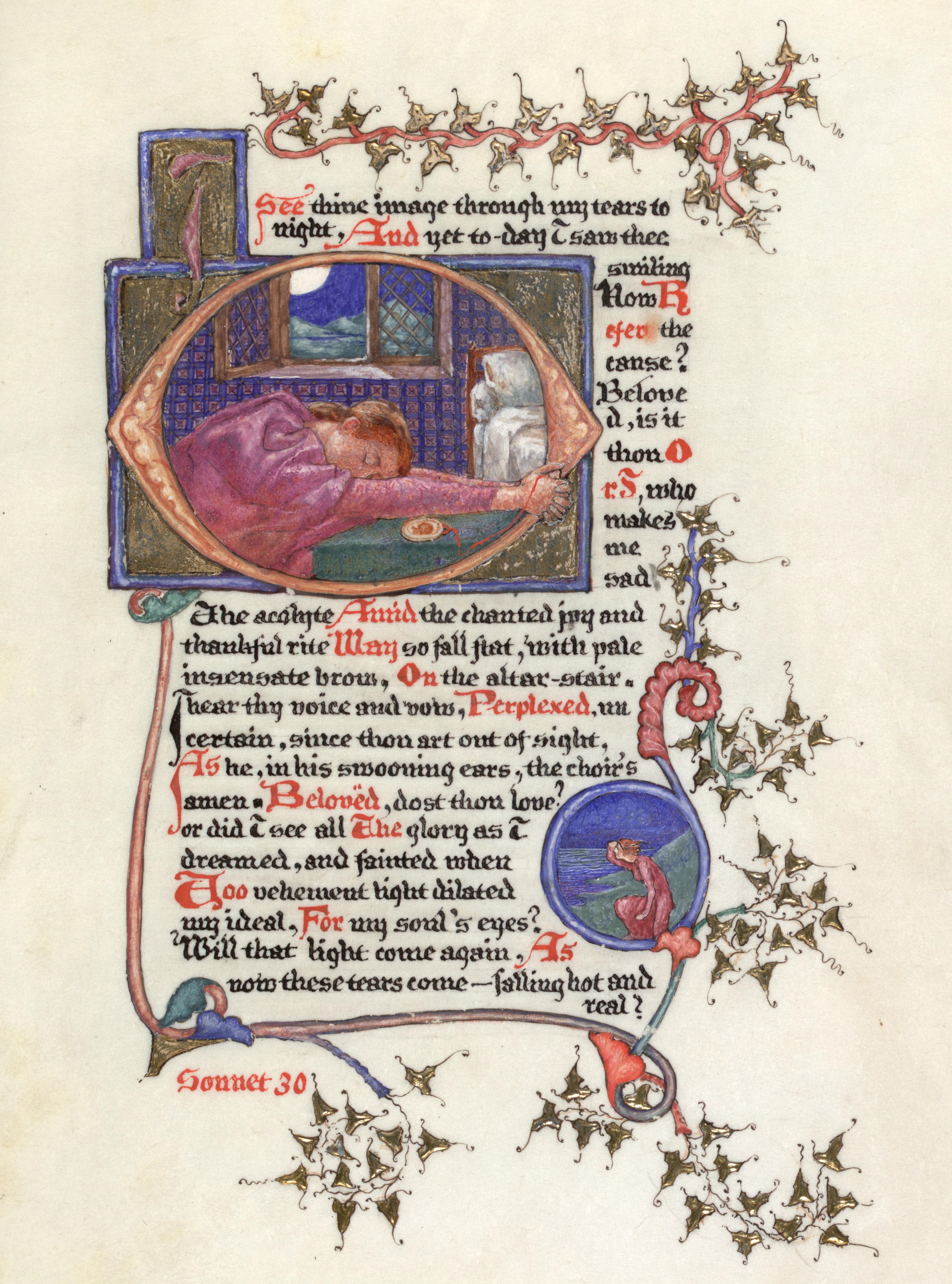
Phoebe Anna Traquair's illuminated copy of Elizabeth Barrett Browning's Sonnets from the Portuguese – Sonnet 30.

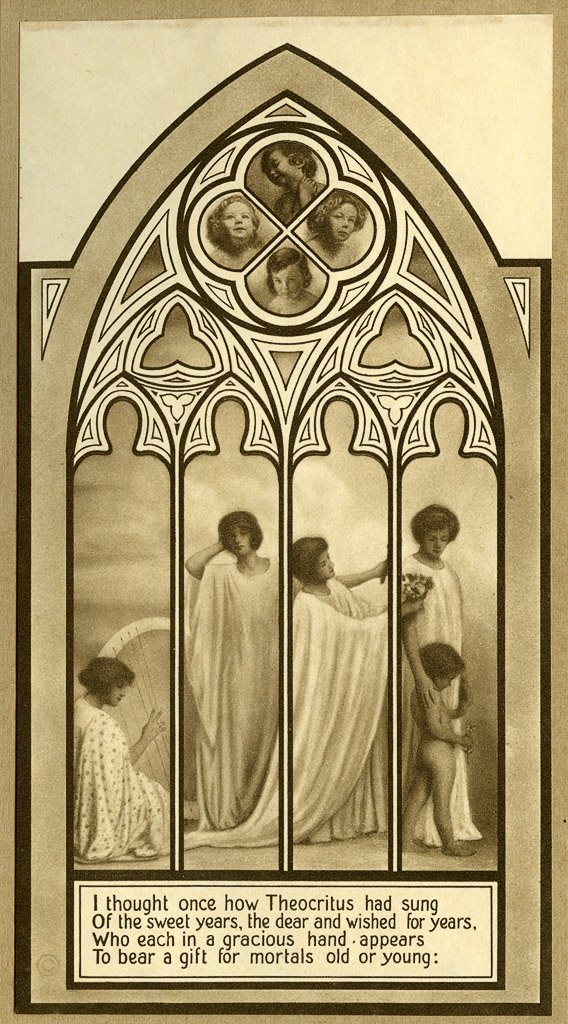
The Sonnets from the Portuguese, published by Adelaide Hanscom Leeson.

Sonnets from the Portuguese, written c. 1845–1846 and published first in 1850, is a collection of 44 love sonnets written by Elizabeth Barrett Browning. The collection was acclaimed and popular during the poet's lifetime and it remains so today. Despite what the title implies, the sonnets are entirely Browning's own, and not translated from Portuguese.

The first line of Sonnet 43 has become one of the most famous in English poetry: "How do I love thee? Let me count the ways."

== Title ==
Barrett Browning was initially hesitant to publish the poems, believing they were too personal. However, her husband Robert Browning insisted they were the best sequence of English-language sonnets since Shakespeare's time and urged her to publish them. To offer the couple some privacy, she decided to publish them as if they were translations of foreign sonnets. She initially planned to title the collection "Sonnets translated from the Bosnian", but Robert Browning proposed that she claim their source was Portuguese, probably because of her admiration for Camões and Robert's nickname for her: "my little Portuguese". The title is also a reference to Les Lettres Portugaises (1669).

== Numbers 33 and 43 ==
The most famous poems from the collection are numbers 33 and 43, especially 43:

=== Number 33 ===
Yes, call me by my pet-name! let me hear
The name I used to run at, when a child,
From innocent play, and leave the cowslips piled,
To glance up in some face that proved me dear
With the look of its eyes. I miss the clear
Fond voices, which, being drawn and reconciled
Into the music of Heaven's undefiled,
Call me no longer. Silence on the bier,
While I call God...call God!—So let thy mouth
Be heir to those who are now exanimate:
Gather the north flowers to complete the south,
And catch the early love up in the late!
Yes, call me by that name,—and I, in truth,
With the same heart, will answer, and not wait.

=== Number 43 ===
How do I love thee? Let me count the ways.
I love thee to the depth and breadth and height
My soul can reach, when feeling out of sight
For the ends of Being and Ideal Grace.
I love thee to the level of everyday's
Most quiet need, by sun and candlelight.
I love thee freely, as men strive for Right;
I love thee purely, as they turn from Praise;
I love thee with the passion put to use
In my old griefs, and with my childhood's faith;
I love thee with a love I seemed to lose
With my lost saints,—I love thee with the breath,
Smiles, tears, of all my life!—and, if God choose,
I shall but love thee better after death.

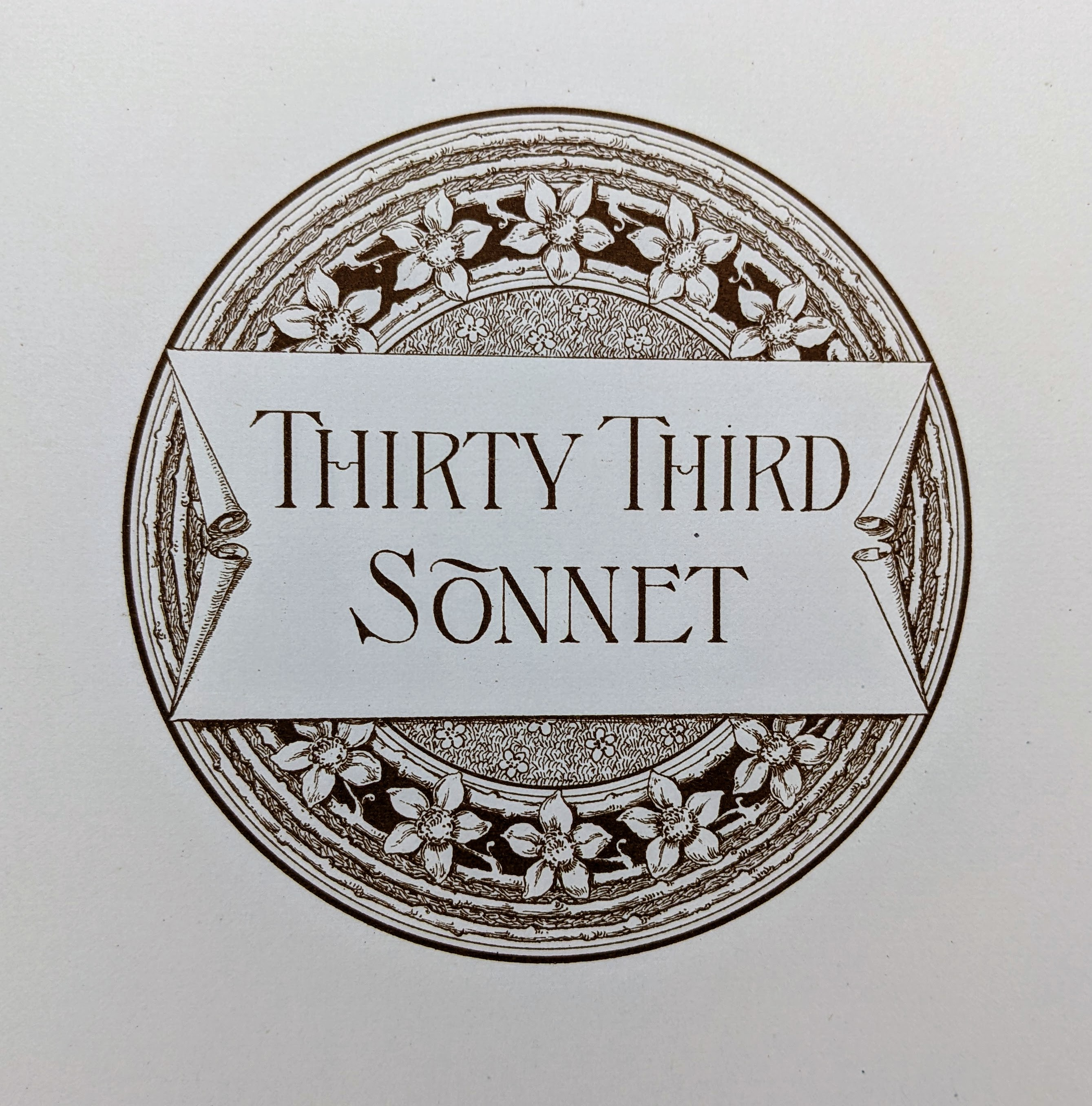
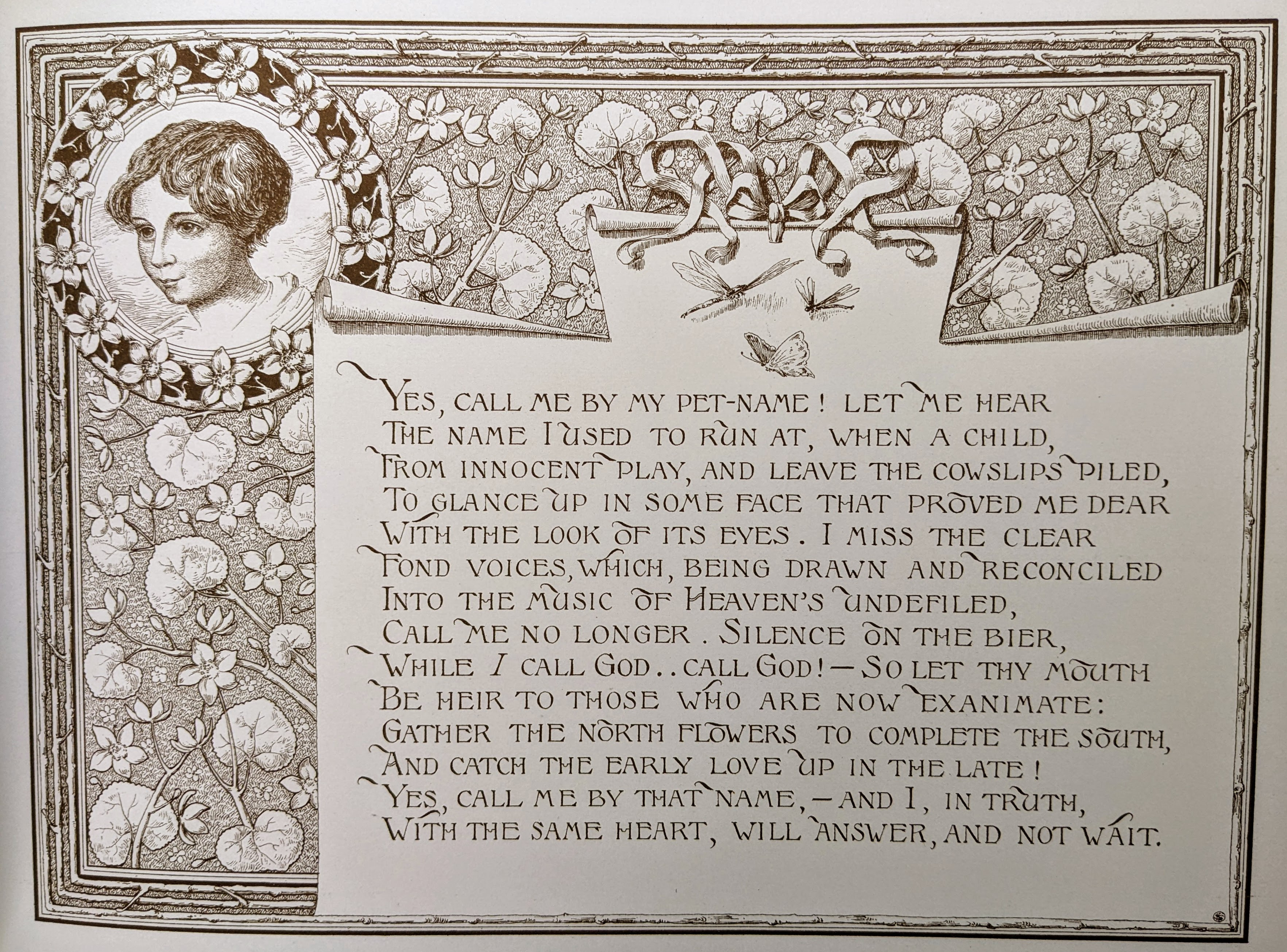
Sonnet Thirty-three, illustrated by Ludvig Sandöe Ipsen, 1886

== In popular culture ==
The first line of Sonnet 43 has been used in a number of titles and works.

=== Music ===
- "Let Me Count the Ways" (Yoko Ono song), 1980 song from Milk and Honey
- "Let Me Count the Ways" (Natural song), 2002
- "Let Me Count the Ways (I Love You)", a 1976 song by The Temptations from The Temptations Do the Temptations
- "Let Me Count the Ways", a 1980 song by Tanya Tucker from Dreamlovers
- "How Do I Love Thee", a 1984 instrumental by The Shadows from Guardian Angel
- "Let Me Count the Ways", a 1984 song by Steve Hackett from Till We Have Faces
- "Let Me Count the Ways", a 1996 song by Dave Koz from Off the Beaten Path
- "How do I love thee?", from Sonnets from the Portuguese by Libby Larsen (1990)

=== Literature ===
- Let Me Count the Ways, a 1965 work by Peter De Vries
- Let Me Count the Ways, a 1988 novel by Leigh Michaels
- Let Me Count the Ways: Discovering Great Sex Without Intercourse, a 1999 book by Marty Klein
- "Let Me Count the Ways", a 2007 poem by Matthew Byrne, also appearing in The Best American Poetry 2007

=== Television ===
- "Let Me Count the Ways", an episode of Knots Landing
- "Let Me Count the Ways", an episode of Cheers
- "Let Me Count the Ways", an episode of The Red Green Show
- "How Do I Love Thee", a fictional gameshow for newly-weds on Married... with Children

The collection also appears in the show Buffy the Vampire Slayer, when it is gifted to Buffy by a love interest.

== See also ==
- Thomas James Wise, who authenticated a forged edition.
