= Michael Johnson (drummer) =

American drummer (born 1982)

- Born: Michael Wayne Johnson; July 30, 1982 (age 44); Orlando, Florida, U.S.
- Origin: Orlando, FL; Los Angeles
- Genres: Pop, rock
- Occupations: Singer-songwriter, drummer
- Instruments: Vocals, drums
- Years active: 1999–present
- Labels: Transcontinental Records (2000–2004) (Natural), Blue Suede Records (2005–present)

Michael Wayne Johnson (born July 30, 1982) is an American pop singer and drummer, formerly of the boyband "Natural". He performed with various projects until joining Marc Terenzi in a new band Terenzi in 2008.

== Early life ==
Michael Wayne Johnson was born on July 30, 1982 in Orlando, Florida. He began dancing at the age of 4. He eventually began to dance professionally, winning many awards and scholarships. He also danced for many Disney and television specials growing up. At the age of 8, he began to study voice and performing in musical theatre. At the age of 13, he won the titles "Mr. Dance of Florida" and "Teen Dancer of the year".

== Natural ==
Michael Johnson began a boy band with friend Patrick King, alongside Marc Terenzi and Ben Bledsoe. After many lineup changes, the band added Michael "J" Horn and settled on the name Natural.

The boys tried to get signed with many major labels, but were turned down despite a local success in Orlando, FL. After being notice by music manager Lou Pearlman while rehearsing at Transcontinental Studios, the band signed with Pearlman's label TransCon Records.

To set Natural apart from other boy bands, Pearlman wanted the boys to not only dance and sing, but to also play instruments. While some of the other members already played various instruments, it was through this arrangement that Johnson started learning percussion and became the band's drummer for their debut album Keep It Natural (2002).

In 2001, Johnson provided the singing voice for the US version of The Simpsons character Bart in the episode "New Kids on the Blecch".

Pearlman maintained strict prohibitions against facial hair, piercings or tattoos, girlfriends, and "unwholesome" behaviour, though, dubbed the "bad boy" of the group, Johnson was allowed to have his lip pierced and was required to maintain his blue spikes in his hair until the group disbanded.

In the summer of 2003 Terenzi's partner Sarah Connor became pregnant and the couple got engaged. Around this time, Natural was coming back from a hiatus and releasing a single "What If" from their second album It's Only Natural. Pearlman was not happy with the news and wanted Terenzi kicked out of the band and replaced with someone new. The other members were not thrilled with this and decided to break Natural up after their tour.

== Life after Natural ==
Once Natural disbanded, Johnson wished to remain close to his now former bandmates. He was asked to stay with the 'New Natural', which also would be run by Lou Pearlman under the same format as the previous edition. Although Patrick King had already agreed to this, Johnson decided against the arrangement after a period of time.

After turning down the idea of staying in the 'New Natural' Michael got word that Marc Terenzi and Mike Castonguay (former producer and musical director for Natural) were forming a band named Jaded Rose with Paul Rippee. However, disagreements arose early as Terenzi wanted to continue to make pop rock songs, while the other members wanted to focus on a more pure rock sound, and the group disbanded despite offers of a reality TV show in Germany and a record deal. Terenzi continued on a pop rock solo artist while Johnson and the other members went off to form Lukewarm Freeda with a more hard edged punk blues sound.

Johnson and Castonguay wrote for the next four months, including the songs Little Miss Get Around (featured on Veronica Mars) and Downtown Love (featured in the film I'm Through with White Girls). The band performed several shows in Los Angeles, Nashville and Orlando with Rippee as a touring bassist before relocating to Los Angeles, where they worked together with several bands in the area.

== Other ventures ==
In 2005 Johnson formed his own label 'Blue Suede Records'.

=== 2008: Terenzi ===
On May 7, 2008, it was announced on Marc Terenzi's official MySpace that he and Johnson had formed a new band alongside Benny Richter.

It is true that I am forming a new band. A project that is more edgy and modern. We plan on taking the new music to a whole new level. music that both my old fans and new fans will like, that is why I will form a new band. We don't know what the name of the project should be but if you have any Ideas let us know. you never know maybe we pick a name you give us. The members that will always be a part of this new band are Myself, Benny Richter and Michael Johnson (Natural). We are bringing a whole lot more edge to our music and are busy working in the studio right now. we have really big plans for this year so get ready for a crazy journey.

In June 2008, it was announced the new group had been formed under the name 'Terenzi'. 'Terenzi' consisted of Johnson, Marc Terenzi, Benny Richter, Kai Stuffel and Christian Adameit. For their first single the group covered Michael Jackson's Billie Jean in a much slower arrangement. "Billie Jean" was scheduled to be released on August 8, 2008. An album titled "Black Roses" was set to be released August 28, 2008.

The band was featured in the reality show, Sarah and Marc: Crazy in Love which aired on ProSieben in Germany.

=== New Beat Fund ===
In 2011 Johnson joined the band New Beat Fund as a drummer. The band was formed in 2011 in Los Angeles and featured guitarist/lead-vocalist Jeff Laliberte, bassist Paul Laliberte, guitarist Shelby Archer, and Johnson.
