= It's Only Natural (Natural album) =

Studio album by Natural
- Released: March 15, 2004
- Recorded: 2003–2004
- Genre: Pop rock
- Length: 64:39
- Labels: Sony BMG, Transcontinental
- Producers: Mike Castonguay, B-Rich, Richie Supa, John Merchant, Alan Glass, Gary Baker, Anthony Little, Billy Chapin, Ben Bledsoe, Emil Gotthard, Dakari, Kay Denar, Rob Tyger

Natural chronology
| Keep It Natural (2002) | It's Only Natural (2004) |

Singles from It's Only Natural
- 1. "What If" Released: November 10, 2003; 2. "Let Me Just Fly" Released: February 16, 2004; 3. "Just One Last Dance" Released: March 1, 2004; 4. "Why it Hurts" Released: September 13, 2004

It's Only Natural is the second and final studio album released by American boy band Natural, released via Sony BMG and Transcontinental Records in Germany on March 15, 2004. The album was preceded by the release of the singles "What If", "Let Me Just Fly" and "Just One Last Dance", a collaboration with Sarah Connor. The album fared moderately, and was later released in Japan, but became the band's final album.

== Background ==
The album became the band's second and final release, after their split was announced during their It's Only Natural Farewell Tour. It's Only Natural was a complete departure from the band's debut album, Keep It Natural, which took inspiration from manager Lou Pearlman's other boyband, O-Town. This time, the band decided to take a more mature musical direction, drawing upon a rock and pop sound similar to that of The Calling. The album also drew inspiration from Pearlman's biggest success, the Backstreet Boys.

Four singles were released from the album: "What If", released on November 10, 2003, "Let Me Just Fly", released on February 16, 2004, "Just One Last Dance", a collaboration with Sarah Connor, released on March 1, 2004, and "Why It Hurts", released on September 13, 2004. The German version of the album omits "Just One Last Dance", and also does not include "Why it Hurts", due to the fact it was recorded after the album's initial release, but before the release of the album in Japan, hence its appearance. "Just One Last Dance" also appears on the Japanese version. "Cabdriver" and "3 Miles" had been planned for released as singles, but due to band's disbandment, nothing came of them. As "Cabdriver" was recorded after the album's release, it only appeared as a B-side in Germany, but again, appears on the Japanese release. All four singles from the album appeared in the German Singles Chart top forty, despite little promotion. The album was released in Germany, Austria, Switzerland as well as Malaysia, Philippines, and Japan.

== Track listing ==
Standard edition
| No. | Title | Writer(s) | Producer(s) | Length |
|---|---|---|---|---|
| 1. | "Intro" | | | 0:47 |
| 2. | "Never" | Ben Bledsoe, Michael Johnson, Richie Supa | Mike Castonguay | 3:15 |
| 3. | "Let Me Just Fly" | Alan Glass, Sandi Strmljan, Ben Bledsoe, Mike Castonguay, Marc Terenzi | Mike Castonguay, B-Rich | 3:31 |
| 4. | "What If" (Eric Nova Radio Mix) | Richie Supa, Nina Ossoft, Jodi Marr | Richie Supa, John Merchant | 4:11 |
| 5. | "How She Makes Me Feel" | Ben Bledsoe, Michael Johnson, Richie Supa | Richie Supa, John Merchant | 3:45 |
| 6. | "Strange" | Gary Baker, Anthony Little, Kevin Richardson | Gary Baker, Anthony Little | 4:10 |
| 7. | "Comin' Up" | Ben Bledsoe, Marc Terenzi, Richie Supa, John Merchant | Mike Castonguay, B-Rich | 4:10 |
| 8. | "3 Miles" | Billy Chapin, Ben Bledsoe, Marc Terenzi | Billy Chapin | 4:08 |
| 9. | "One Day Too Late" | Gary Baker, Anthony Little, Howie Dorough | Gary Baker, Anthony Little | 3:41 |
| 10. | "Somedays and Mondays" | Billy Chapin, Dan Miller, Christy Beu, Candice | Billy Chapin | 4:26 |
| 11. | "Now or Never" | Ben Bledsoe, Marc Terenzi, Fredrik Thomander, Andreas Wikström | Mike Castonguay, B-Rich | 3:07 |
| 12. | "Rock the World With You" | Dan Attlerud, Lars Andersson | Mike Castonguay, B-Rich | 3:10 |
| 13. | "Drownin'" | Ben Bledsoe, Michael Johnson | Mike Castonguay, Ben Bledsoe | 2:00 |
| 14. | "I Guess It's Over" | Rich Cronin, Aaron Accetta, Ben Bledsoe, Marc Terenzi, Patrick King Jr., Michael Johnson | Mike Castonguay, B-Rich | 4:34 |
| 15. | "I Don't Think of You" | Jörgen Elofsson, Dan Hill, Keith Folleso | Emil Gotthard | 4:16 |
| 16. | "Blew Me Away" | Mike Castonguay, Ben Bledsoe, Michael Johnson, Marc Terenzi | Mike Castonguay, B-Rich | 4:09 |

Japanese edition
| No. | Title | Writer(s) | Producer(s) | Length |
|---|---|---|---|---|
| 1. | "Let Me Just Fly" | Alan Glass, Sandi Strmljan, Ben Bledsoe, Mike Castonguay, Marc Terenzi | Mike Castonguay, B-Rich | 3:31 |
| 2. | "What If" (Eric Nova Radio Mix) | Richie Supa, Nina Ossoft, Jodi Marr | Richie Supa, John Merchant | 4:11 |
| 3. | "How She Makes Me Feel" | Ben Bledsoe, Michael Johnson, Richie Supa | Richie Supa, John Merchant | 3:45 |
| 4. | "Comin' Up" | Ben Bledsoe, Marc Terenzi, Richie Supa, John Merchant | Mike Castonguay, B-Rich | 4:10 |
| 5. | "Why it Hurts" | Richie Supa, Nina Ossoft, Jodi Marr | Richie Supa, John Merchant | 4:40 |
| 6. | "3 Miles" | Billy Chapin, Ben Bledsoe, Marc Terenzi | Billy Chapin | 4:08 |
| 7. | "Now or Never" | Ben Bledsoe, Marc Terenzi, Fredrik Thomander, Andreas Wikström | Mike Castonguay, B-Rich | 3:07 |
| 8. | "Cabdriver" | Dakari, Rich Cronin, Robert Campman | Dakari | 3:29 |
| 9. | "I Don't Think of You" | Jorgen Elofsson, Dan Hill, Keith Folleso | Emil Gotthard | 4:16 |
| 10. | "Strange" | Gary Baker, Anthony Little, Kevin Richardson | Gary Baker, Anthony Little | 4:10 |
| 11. | "Interlude I (Intro)" | Ben Bledsoe, Richie Supa | Richie Supa, John Merchant | 0:47 |
| 12. | "I Guess It's Over" | Ben Bledsoe, Rich Cronin, Aaron Accetta, Marc Terenzi, Patrick King Jr., Michael Johnson | Mike Castonguay, B-Rich | 4:34 |
| 13. | "Rock the World With You" | Dan Attlerud, Lars Andersson | Mike Castonguay, B-Rich | 3:10 |
| 14. | "One Day Too Late" | Gary Baker, Anthony Little, Howie Dorough | Gary Baker, Anthony Little | 3:41 |
| 15. | "Never" | Ben Bledsoe, Richie Supa, Michael Johnson | Mike Castonguay | 3:15 |
| 16. | "Just One Last Dance" (with Sarah Connor) | Kay Denar, Rob Tyger | Kay Denar, Rob Tyger | 4:11 |
| 17. | "Somedays and Mondays" | Billy Chapin, Dan Miller, Christy Beu, Candice | Billy Chapin | 4:26 |
| 18. | "Interlude II" | Ben Bledsoe, Richie Supa | Richie Supa, John Merchant | 1:12 |
| 19. | "Drownin'" | Ben Bledsoe, Michael Johnson | Mike Castonguay, Ben Bledsoe | 2:00 |
| 20. | "Blew Me Away" | Mike Castonguay, Ben Bledsoe, Michael Johnson, Marc Terenzi | Mike Castonguay, B-Rich | 4:09 |

== Charts and Certifications ==
| Year | Title | Chart Positions | | |
| Year | Title | GER | AU | CH |
|---|---|---|---|---|
| 2004 | It's Only Natural: Released: March 15, 2004; Formats: CD | 31 | - | - |

=== Singles ===
| Year | Title | Chart positions | | | Certifications |
| Year | Title | GER | AU | CH | Certifications |
|---|---|---|---|---|---|
| 2003 | "What If": Released: November 10, 2003; Formats: CD | 34 | - | - | RIAA Certified Gold |
| 2004 | "Let Me Just Fly": Released: February 16, 2004; Formats: CD | 23 | 52 | - | |
| 2004 | "Just One Last Dance": Released: March 1, 2004; Formats: CD | 1 | 5 | 8 | Germany (Gold) |
| 2004 | "Why It Hurts": Released: September 13, 2004; Formats: CD | 49 | - | - | |

== Release history ==
| Country | Date | Format | Catalogue no. |
|---|---|---|---|
| Germany | March 15, 2004 | CD, Digital download | 82876 51390 2 |
| United States | April 27, 2004 | CD, Digital download | EK 76529 |
| Japan | September 6, 2004 | CD, Digital download | BVCP-27064 |
