= Count the Ways (disambiguation) =

"Count the Ways" (2019) is a song by Canadian country artist Jade Eagleson.

Count the Ways may also refer to:

- Count the Ways (novel), by Joyce Maynard (2021)
- "Count the Ways", a song by Close to Home from their 2011 album Never Back Down
- Count the Ways from Funtime Freddy

== See also ==
- Let Me Count the Ways (disambiguation)
