= Let Me Count the Ways =

"How do I love thee, let me count the ways" is a line from the 43rd sonnet of Sonnets from the Portuguese, a collection of 44 love sonnets written by Elizabeth Barrett Browning.

Let Me Count the Ways may also refer to:

== Music ==
- "Let Me Count the Ways" (Yoko Ono song), 1980 song from Milk and Honey
- "Let Me Count the Ways" (Natural song), 2002
- "Let Me Count the Ways (I Love You)", a 1976 song by The Temptations from The Temptations Do The Temptations
- "Let Me Count the Ways", a 1980 song by Tanya Tucker from Dreamlovers (album)
- "Let Me Count the Ways", a 1984 song by Steve Hackett from Till We Have Faces
- "Let Me Count the Ways", a 1996 song by Dave Koz from Off the Beaten Path
- "Let Me Count the Ways", a 1985 song by Michael Franks from Skin Dive

== Literature ==
- Let Me Count the Ways, a 1965 work by Peter De Vries
- Let Me Count the Ways, a 1988 novel by Leigh Michaels
- Let Me Count the Ways: Discovering Great Sex Without Intercourse, a 1999 book by Marty Klein
- "Let Me Count the Ways", a 2007 poem by Matthew Byrne, also appearing in The Best American Poetry 2007

== Television ==
- "Let Me Count the Ways" (Cheers), a 1983 episode
- "Let Me Count the Ways" (Knots Landing), a 1980 episode
- "Let Me Count the Ways" (The Red Green Show), a 1997 episode
