= It's Only Natural =

It's Only Natural may refer to:

- "It's Only Natural" (song), a 1991 song by Australian/New Zealand rock group Crowded House
- It's Only Natural (Natural album) (2004)
- It's Only Natural (The Higher album) (2009)
- It's Only Natural (The Oak Ridge Boys album) (2011)
- It's Only Natural (Red Hot Chili Peppers album) (2022)
