= Put Your Arms Around Me =

Put Your Arms Around Me may refer to:

- "Put Your Arms Around Me" (Natural song)
- "Put Your Arms Around Me" (Texas song)
- "Put Your Arms Around Me" (Natasha Bedingfield song)
- "Put Your Arms Around Me Honey" – by Junie McCree / Albert Von Tilzer from the Broadway production of "Madame Sherry" (1910)
