= New Kids on the Blecch =

- The Simpsons episode
- Episode no.: Season 12; Episode 14
- Directed by: Steven Dean Moore
- Written by: Tim Long
- Production code: CABF12
- Original air date: February 25, 2001

Guest appearances
- Justin Timberlake, Chris Kirkpatrick, JC Chasez, Joey Fatone and Lance Bass as themselves; Ben Bledsoe as Ralph's singing voice; Marc Terenzi as Nelson's singing voice; Michael 'J' Horn as Milhouse's singing voice; Michael Johnson as Bart's singing voice

Episode features
- Chalkboard gag: "I will not buy a presidential pardon"
- Couch gag: The couch is outside a prison wall. A siren wails and a searchlight moves as the Simpsons (dressed in striped prison jumpsuits) tunnel their way to the couch.
- Commentary: Matt Groening; Mike Scully; Al Jean; Ian Maxtone-Graham; Tim Long; Matt Selman; Tom Gammill and Max Pross; Hank Azaria; Steven Dean Moore; Chris Kirkpatrick

Episode chronology
← Previous "Day of the Jackanapes"	Next → "Hungry, Hungry Homer"
- The Simpsons season 12

"New Kids on the Blecch" is the fourteenth episode of the twelfth season of the American television series The Simpsons. It first aired on Fox in the United States on February 25, 2001. In the episode, a music producer selects Bart, Nelson, Milhouse and Ralph to be members of the next hit boy band Party Posse, who record songs containing subliminal messages about joining the Navy.

The episode was written by Tim Long and directed by Steven Dean Moore. The episode's title is a play on the boy band New Kids on the Block (the second episode title to have a play on the group, the first being 1992's "New Kid on the Block") and Mad Magazine's tendency to use the word "blecch" in their parodic titles. The episode features the members of two contemporary boy bands as special guest voices: NSYNC playing themselves, and Natural providing the singing voices of Party Posse.

The episode has received positive reviews from critics and was watched by over 18 million viewers.

== Plot ==
After watching an Olympic Games documentary on TV, Homer decides to participate in the Springfield marathon to prove to Marge that he is fit. Bart dons a stereotypical Italian disguise and wins the marathon by cheating, but a bird pulls off his fake mustache during the trophy presentation. To escape from the outraged crowd, Bart accepts a ride from a stranger, who introduces himself as music producer L.T. Smash. He offers Bart a chance to join a boy band he is assembling called Party Posse, including Nelson, Ralph and Milhouse. Bart accepts the opportunity, and the four boys quickly rise to stardom, secretly using voice-enhancing software developed by NASA to improve their singing abilities.

Party Posse releases a single "Drop Da Bomb" whose accompanying music video includes the strange line "YVAN EHT NIOJ" in its chorus. Puzzled, Lisa analyzes the video and finds a subliminal recruiting message for the United States Navy within it; she also realizes that the chorus is simply "JOIN THE NAVY" sung backwards. Seeing that the single's hidden message is beginning to affect the Springfield populace, after watching Otto Mann board a navy bus right in front of the Simpsons' house, Lisa confronts Smash, who reveals himself as a Navy lieutenant and explains that popular music has long been used as a recruiting tool by the military, with other examples being Elvis, Sgt. Pepper, Captain & Tennille and the Kiss Army. After Lisa confronts Homer and Marge, they dismiss her claims as stemming from jealousy of Bart's fame.

During a Party Posse concert aboard an aircraft carrier, in which the band performs a song full of subliminal lyrics, Smash's superior officer informs him that the boy band project is being shut down because Party Posse is due to be satirized in an upcoming issue of Mad, sabotaging their recruiting power. The officer turns off Party Posse's voice enhancers, exposing the boys' lack of singing talent and destroying their popularity. Enraged, Smash commandeers the carrier, sending his superior officer overboard, and taking it out to sea as the terrified audience jumps overboard and swims back to the docks. Smash sails the carrier to New York City with the band and Homer (who was in the lavatory at the time) still onboard, and declares his intention to destroy the Mad headquarters. Despite the sudden arrival of boy band NSYNC, Smash fires the missiles and destroys the building. The employees survive unharmed and Smash is arrested; Bart and his friends are disappointed at not having a chance to appear in Mad, but take comfort in reading the planned parody of them.

The episode ends with praise for the Navy by NSYNC, who suggest that viewers enlist. JC Chasez is surprised and dismayed to learn that his bandmates have signed him up without his knowledge, and two military police officers drag him away screaming.

== Production ==
The episode was written by Tim Long and directed by Steven Dean Moore. Mike Scully was frustrated that they had not pitched enough story ideas, so he pitched this episode, along with "Trilogy of Error". During the pitch session, he suggested that NSYNC guest star on one of the pitched episodes. The decision to add a government conspiracy came late, an idea which was pitched by George Meyer. At the table read for the episode, the cast ad-libbed the lyrics and music. During production, it was decided that the kids would not do their own singing, to get a boy band sound and to help Nancy Cartwright (who otherwise voices three of the four), so the producers hired the band Natural for the "Studio Magic" voices, and recorded them in Orlando.

NSYNC instantly said yes to being asked to guest star, although Justin Timberlake had to record his lines separately from the rest of the band due to a family death. During the recording session, the staff brought their kids along to meet the band. Tom Hanks, who was filming Cast Away in the same studio, wanted to meet them and came by. The song that introduces NSYNC every time they walk in is "No Strings Attached". Timberlake was reluctant to say "Word" since he swore it was something he would never say, so as a joke the editing team reused the one take where he said "Word" after nearly every line. Footage of the band recording their lines for the episode was featured over the end credits. On the top of the building of Classified Records, where the band first records their music, the sheet music for "The Star-Spangled Banner" can be seen.

== Reception ==
In its original American broadcast, "New Kids on the Blecch" was viewed by 18.1 million viewers with a 9.7 rating/15 share; this made it the top rated animated show of the week.

Annie Alleman of The Herald News named the episode her fourth favorite Simpsons episode. Colin Jacobson of DVD Movie Guide said "When it parodies boy bands, 'Blecch' has its moments. Granted, it's tough to really mock boy bands, as they always bordered on self-parody; the Party Posse tunes sound a lot like the real thing. Still, the show works pretty well until it gets to the Navy side of things. Then it just becomes dopey and lacks the moderate bite of the earlier scenes. The show also becomes unintentionally eerie when it features an attack on New York" (something that would happen in real life just over six months after this episode was first broadcast). Judge Mac McEntire said the best moment of the episode was the irate choreographer. Corey Deiterman of the Houston Press listed NSYNC as one of the top five worst musical guests in Simpsons history.

At one point in the episode, a flag is depicted on the side of a technical employed by military fighters in Middle Eastern dress. The flag in the episode resembles the flag adopted by the Syrian opposition in the Syrian Civil War, but is actually the Independence flag. The resemblance was cited by some supporters of the Syrian government and media in the Middle East as evidence that the Syrian rebellion was a foreign plot.
