= Let Me Count the Ways (Natural song) =

Single by Natural

from the album Keep It Natural
- Released: June 3, 2002
- Recorded: 2002
- Genre: Pop
- Length: 4:13
- Label: Sony BMG
- Songwriters: Fredrik Thomander, Anders Wikström, Richie Supa
- Producer: Lou Pearlman

Natural singles chronology
"Put Your Arms Around Me" (2001)	"Let Me Count the Ways" (2002)	"Will It Ever" (2002)

"Let Me Count the Ways" is a pop song performed by American boy band Natural. It was their second single released in Germany.

== Background ==
After success with their debut single, "Put Your Arms Around Me", Lou Pearlman decided to release another teen friendly song for the European market. "Let Me Count the Ways" was chosen despite protests from the band members. Marc Terenzi has been quoted as saying "That was the beginning of the end". Indeed, the band started fighting hard for more mature releases, until they got their wish with "Paradise". Despite the protests of the members, the single was one of their highest charting, even beating "Put Your Arms Around Me" peaking at #11 in Germany.

== Track listing ==
1. "Let Me Count the Ways" (Original Mix)
2. "Let Me Count the Ways" (GC's Mix)
3. "Let Me Count the Ways" (Melino Mix)
4. "Let Me Count the Ways" (J Cosmic Mix)
5. "Let Me Count the Ways" (Instrumental)
6. "Bravo Special Tour Track" (Limited Edition Bonus Track Only)

== Music charts ==
Chart (2002)	Peak position
Austria (Ö3 Austria Top 40)	49
Germany (GfK)	11
Switzerland (Schweizer Hitparade)	57
