= Terenzi =

Terenzi is a surname. Notable people with the surname include:

- Antonella Terenzi (born 1965), Italian synchronized swimmer
- Danilo Terenzi (1956–1995), Italian jazz trombonist and composer
- Fiorella Terenzi, Italian-born astrophysicist
- Gianfranco Terenzi (1941-2020), Sammarinese politician
- Marc Terenzi (born 1978), American pop singer
- Terenzio Terenzi (1575–1621), Italian painter
- Tonhi Terenzi (born 1969), Italian fencer
