= Pageant Place =

- Genre: Reality
- Starring: Riyo Mori; Rachel Smith; Katie Blair; Hilary Cruz; Tara Conner
- Theme music composer: Evan Taubenfeld; Mike Castonguay
- Opening theme: "It's Alright"
- Country of origin: United States
- No. of seasons: 1
- No. of episodes: 8

Production
- Executive producer: Donald Trump
- Production companies: Evolution Film & Tape; Miss Universe Organization; Trump Productions; MTV Production Development

Original release
- Network: MTV
- Release: October 10 – November 28, 2007

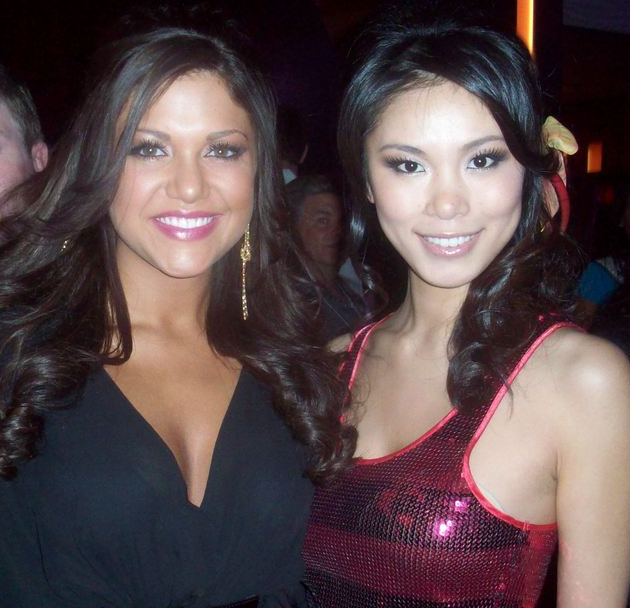
Hilary Cruz and Riyo Mori in 2008

Pageant Place is an American reality television series that follows Miss Universe Organization pageant winners Miss Universe Riyo Mori, Miss USA Rachel Smith and Miss Teen USA 2006 Katie Blair, (who was later replaced by her successor Miss Teen USA 2007 Hilary Cruz) as they live together in an apartment in New York City. They are guided by Miss USA 2006 Tara Conner, in a chaperonal role.

MTV received high ratings for the premiere of the show on October 10, 2007. There were plans to continue with the show in 2008 when Dayana Mendoza, the new Miss Universe, Crystle Stewart, Miss USA, and Stevi Perry, Miss Teen USA winners that had been crowned, something that never materialized.

The show also features the song "Beauty Queen Killer" by young artist JoJo. The theme song "It's Alright" was written and produced by Evan Taubenfeld, from Sire Records, and Mike Castonguay.

== Episodes ==
No.	Title	Original release date
1	"After the Fall"	October 10, 2007
Riyo moves in with Katie and Rachel but there's a surprise as former Miss USA Tara will be joining them for another year.
2	"Reign of Tara"	October 17, 2007
Former Miss USA Tara Conner comes back which makes it awkward at Pageant Place as Katie and her haven't talked since their falling out.
3	"There is No 'I' in Teen"	October 24, 2007
As the hectic lives of the beauty queens march on Katie's immaturity and lack of responsibility starts to affect her job and her relationship with the other girls.
4	"Kiss and (Put on Some) Makeup"	October 31, 2007
After talking about what it's like to live with Katie, Rachel and Tara start to form a friendship and later Katie and Tara finally clear things up between them.
5	"Ta Ta to Miss Teen"	November 7, 2007
As she prepares to crown Miss Teen USA 2007, Katie has to deal with saying goodbye to the girls, while juggling her relationship with Josh.
6	"One Teen Leads To Another"	November 14, 2007
Katie Blair hands over her crown to Miss Teen Colorado, Hilary Cruz, but Miss South Carolina's infamous answer keeps stealing the spotlight from Hilary.
7	"Maybe I Should Give Her My Sash"	November 21, 2007
It's non-stop action as the girls pose for an ad campaign and roadtrip to Vegas for the MTV Video Music Awards, where (former Miss Teen USA) Katie makes a surprise visit.
8	"On Their Own 2 Feet"	November 28, 2007
In the apartment, Rachel, Hilary and Riyo are enjoying a lazy afternoon and comment on how happy they are it is just the three of them, unaware that Katie and Josh have returned to New York and are about to stop by for a surprise.
