= Welcome to the Blacklist Club =

Studio album by Evan Taubenfeld
- Released: May 18, 2010
- Genre: Pop rock
- Length: 33:52
- Label: Sire
- Producer: John Fields

Singles from Welcome to the Blacklist Club
- 1. "Boy Meets Girl" Released: March 31, 2009; 2. "Pumpkin Pie" Released: July 22, 2010

Welcome to the Blacklist Club is the debut and only studio album by American singer-songwriter, Evan Taubenfeld. It was released on May 18, 2010 by Sire Records, being Taubenfeld's only release with the label.

As of December 2024, the album has been removed from all streaming services.

== Background ==
Taubenfeld was originally scheduled to release his debut studio album, Just Sign Here... in early 2006, although inner turmoil and creative differences between Warner Bros. Records and Taubenfeld would result in this effort being scrapped. However, Taubenfeld would continue to record music, now enlisting the assistance of John Fields, which would ultimately be released in 2010 as Welcome to the Blacklist Club.

When speaking on the record, Taubenfeld described it as "being [about] a hopeless romantic trapped under a cinnamon-coated shell that is L.A., I think your outside hardens when you live out here. Most people don’t express how much they want to fall in love. For me, half the album is about being able to expose that. The other half...is more about having fun".

== Singles ==
- "Cheater of the Year" was released as a promotional single on February 24 to iTunes and other digital download websites. An accompanying lyric video was also released onto Myspace.
- "Boy Meets Girl" released on March 31, 2009 was the first official single for the album. A lyric video was created for this song as well.
- "Starbucks Girl" was released on February 9, and a music video was also put up.
- "Pumpkin Pie" is the single which was released in 2010 in support of the album. There is a lyric video for this with an actual video released in July 2010.

=== Other songs ===
- On August 12, a video for "It's Like That" was released on the Evan Taubenfeld website, as a reward to the fans for getting "Boy Meets Girl" to one million plays on Myspace. However, although it has a video, it has not yet been released in single format. The video, unlike the previous videos, is not a lyric video, and features clips of Evan in various places singing the song, and many photographs of his friends and fanbase, which were sent to him prior to the creation of the video.

== Promotional touring ==
=== Snakes and Suits Acoustic Tour ===
Prior to the release of the album, around Spring 2009, Evan toured with This Providence and The Academy Is... on the Snakes and Suits acoustic tour in promotion of the current single, Boy Meets Girl, and his debut album and career. He played a set of five songs on most tour dates.

1. "Razorblade Limeade"
2. "Cheater of the Year"
3. "Story of Me and You"
4. "Pumpkin Pie"
5. "Boy Meets Girl"

=== Metro Station support ===
In summer/fall of 2009, he is touring in North America with Metro Station.

=== Planned world tour ===
In various videos, Evan has suggested that he has plans to go on a world tour after the release of Welcome to the Blacklist Club, probably either Winter or Spring 2010.

=== Avril Lavigne Black Star Tour ===
Evan played as an opening act for Avril Lavigne on the North American Leg of her 2011 Black Star World Tour.

== Track listing ==
No.	Title	Writer(s)	Length
1.	"Pumpkin Pie"	Evan Taubenfeld · Kevin Kadish · Adam Richman	3:52
2.	"Boy Meets Girl"	Taubenfeld · Richman · William James McAuley III · Alex Scutro	3:22
3.	"The Story of Me and You"	Taubenfeld · Richman	3:11
4.	"Matter of Time"	Taubenfeld · Brian Howes	2:53
5.	"It's Like That"	Taubenfeld · Kadish	2:41
6.	"Razorblade Limeade"	Taubenfeld · Luke Walker	4:08
7.	"Cheater of the Year"	Taubenfeld · Kadish	3:01
8.	"Evan Way"	Taubenfeld	4:02
9.	"Waiting"	Taubenfeld · Kadish	3:40
10.	"Better Than You"	Taubenfeld · Kadish	3:09
Total length:			33:52

== Personnel ==
- Evan Taubenfeld - Vocals, guitar, bass, piano, programming, additional production
- Devin Bronson - Guitar
- Mike Castonguay - Bass
- Isaac Carpenter - Drums
- John Fields - Keyboards, additional guitars, bass, background vocals, producer, engineer, mixer
- Kevin Kadish - Programming, keyboards, guitar, additional production, engineering
- Dorian Crozier - Drums
- Stephen Lu - String arrangements, keyboards
- Drew Taubenfeld - Additional guitars
- Avril Lavigne - Background vocals
- Will Owsley - Background vocals
- John Taylor - Background vocals
- Jason Scheff - Background vocals
- Jimmy Coup - Background vocals
- Chuck Gladfelter - Background vocals
- Ross Hogarth - Engineer
- Tom Lord-Alge - Mixer
- Steve Ferlazzo - Arranger

== Charts ==
Weekly chart performance for Welcome to the Blacklist Club
Chart (2010)	Peak position
US Heatseekers Albums (Billboard)	41
