= Les Henderson =

Canadian consumer fraud author

- Writing career
- Period: 2000-present
- Genre: Non-fiction
- Subjects: Schemes, Scams, Frauds
- Website: www.crimes-of-persuasion.com

Les Henderson is a Canadian consumer fraud author and webmaster of Crimes of Persuasion, a consumer-fraud awareness site.

Henderson published two books, "Crimes Of Persuasion" and "Under Investigation". His first book "Crimes Of Persuasion" describes a large variety of 'schemes, scams and frauds'. Henderson's second book "Under Investigation" scrutinizes Florida Attorney General (now Governor) Charlie Crist's investigation into the Lou Pearlman owned Wilhelmina Scouting Network.

== Legal issues and critics' actions ==
In 2002 a Forex operation sued Henderson, forcing a temporary closure of his site pending a multimillion-dollar lawsuit against him for defamation.

June 2004 Henderson and others were served with a lawsuit by Fashion Rock, LLC (aka Talent Rock), a Florida company then owned by Lou Pearlman, accusing them of "violation of the federal and Florida versions of the Racketeer Influenced and Corrupt Organizations Act, tortious interference with business relationships, defamation, false light invasion of privacy, misappropriation of trade secrets and civil conspiracy".

Also in June 2004 about a dozen identical sites were erected by Fashion Rock CEO Mark Tolner "to attack critics" (a.o. Les Henderson and Ripoff Report), Shortly thereafter the "Bureau of Ethical Internet Commerce" was put up by Ayman Ahmed El-Difrawi (an ex-con for fraud and Pearlman's leading consultant in his talent scouting businesses) for apparently the same reason. Several anonymous writings, containing unsourced offensive allegations about Henderson, have appeared on message boards, blogs, press releases and mock sites that can easily be found on the Internet. Henderson in return successfully filed a libel suit against Pearlman, Mark Tolner, Ayman El-Difrawi, and several other corporations and individuals. Difrawi and three other defendants were ordered to pay Henderson $10.000 each "for their part in the creation, publication or republication of the libellous statements",

In November 2007, St. Petersburg Times personal finance editor Helen Huntly reported that El-Difrawi had founded a business and web site also called Crimes of Persuasion imitating Henderson's, using his real name.

On November 21, 2007, Ayman A. Difrawi and Internet Solutions Corporation filed a lawsuit against Henderson and others, accusing them of defamation, trade libel, injurious falsehood, false light invasion of privacy, civil conspiracy, and RICO violations.

== Bibliography ==
- Les Henderson (2000). Crimes of Persuasion: Schemes, scams, frauds. Coyote Ridge Publishing. ISBN 0-9687133-0-0.
- Les Henderson (2006). Under Investigation: The Inside Story of the Florida Attorney General's Investigation of Wilhelmina Scouting Network, the Largest Model and Talent Scam in America. Coyote Ridge Publishing. ISBN 0-9687133-3-5.
