= Ben Bledsoe =

American singer and actor

- Born: Benjamin Frederick Bledsoe; May 11, 1982 (age 44); Snellville, Georgia, U.S.
- Origin: Orlando, Florida, U.S. Los Angeles, California, U.S.
- Genres: Pop, rock
- Occupations: Singer, actor
- Years active: 1999–present
- Formerly of: Natural

Benjamin Frederick Bledsoe (born May 11, 1982) is an American pop singer, formerly of the band Natural. He is currently an actor, voice actor, and solo singer living in Los Angeles, California.

== Early life and education ==
Bledsoe was a child model and acted in several commercials and television shows throughout the 1990s while growing up in California. He was an active member of "Odyssey of the Mind" – A creative problem solving competition for students from Kindergarten through College. His teams went to world competition several times and placed top 10 in the world multiple years in a row. This later translated into him becoming a member of MENSA, which boasts a 1% acceptance rating. He guest starred on shows such as the Nickelodeon TV series The Mystery Files of Shelby Woo in 1997. In his teen years he moved to Longwood, Florida, a suburb of Orlando, where he met future bandmate Marc Terenzi. At 16 he helped formed the band Natural, with fellow members Patrick King, Michael Johnson, and later Michael 'J' Horn.

== Career ==
=== Natural ===
After his move to Florida, Bledsoe worked as a teen actor, but after meeting Terenzi, he decided to shift his career path and start a band. The band was a mix of rock and pop. Although they were a full band when performing live, they would perform a cappella renditions of their music at local venues to help gain recognition and expand their fanbase. Their first show at the House of Blues in Orlando completely sold out.

Producer Veit Renn signed the band and they started recording new music. Natural obtained a following in Orlando, and Veit decided to send them on a promotional tour of Germany. Lou Pearlman saw them perform at the German Festival "Popkomm" in Cologne while they filled in for the headlining act who missed their flight. It was a show in front of 150,000 people who decidedly loved the young band that added an edge to the pop world. Pearlman was there promoting another act and very soon after they were signed with Transcontinental Records.

Pearlman promoted the first single with Claire's and sent the band on a tour with the Monkees, traveling by private jet and tour bus. The first single "Put Your Arms Around Me" became RIAA-certified Gold, and reached the Billboard Sales Chart Position of No. 8.

Soon thereafter, Natural was signed to BMG International, based in Munich. The band immediately started touring in the Philippines, Thailand, Malaysia, Singapore, Japan, Germany, Switzerland, Austria, England, Scotland, Italy, Spain, France, and Sweden. They had success with such hits as "Put Your Arms Around Me", "Will It Ever", "Runaway", "Let Me Just Fly", "What If", and the number-one collaborative hit with Sarah Connor, "Just One Last Dance".

=== The life of an Insomniac ===
Natural finished their last tour in Europe and Asia in September 2004. Bledsoe wrote new music with band members Terenzi and Michael Johnson for a project and he taught himself guitar and piano as a way to enhance his compositional skills.

Bledsoe's new songs were a mixture of pop and rock. He wrote all of the songs himself for his first album and played the guitar and piano (as well as other instruments) in most of the recordings and performances. The CD was named An Insomniac's Guide to a Lonely Heart due to his lack of sleep while creating the album, and the first song he wrote for it, titled "Lonely Heart". He released An Insomniac's Guide to a Lonely Heart on his own record label, 44th Floor Records. It was No. 1 on Amazon.com for exports to Germany, and was in the top 5% of sales overall. It was simultaneously No. 1 and No. 2 on Awarestore.com, beating out Aware's own artists such as John Mayer, Five for Fighting, and Wheatus. The first single release was the tongue-in-cheek song "Boyfriend".

=== Acting ===
After the release of his solo album, Bledsoe sought to do more acting work. He did some Broadway shows, such as Hairspray and Cry-Baby. He studied at The Groundlings and the Lesley Kahn School of Acting, and has guest starred on TV shows such as House, CSI, CSI: NY, Hawaii Five-0, The Mentalist, Castle, and much more. Bledsoe guest starred in the pilot episode of the TV show Glee. He also starred in the Disney Channel show Jessie as Jessie's love interest Brody Winton in an episode called the "Princess and the Pea-Brain" in 2012. Along with television, Bledsoe has filmed several feature films such as Riddle with Val Kilmer and William Sadler among others.

==== Voice acting ====
Bledsoe has performed voiceover work commercials, animated films television shows, and video games.

== Discography ==
Year	Title
2005	An Insomniac's Guide to a Lonely Heart: Debut solo studio album; Released: July 19, 2005; Formats: CD

== Filmography ==
=== Film ===
Year	Film	Role	Notes
2010	Good Grief	Bobby	short film
2011	Ronal the Barbarian	Alibert	(voice: English version)
2012	No One Will Know	Nathan Parker	
2012	Robin Hood: Ghosts of Sherwood 3D	Robin Hood	(voice)
2013	Riddle	Cameron Bronson	
2013	The Kingdom of Special	Cai the Parakeet	(voice)

=== Television ===
Year	Film	Role	Notes
1997	The Mystery Files of Shelby Woo	Nolan Snope	The Mascot Mystery
1997	Kenan & Kel	Brad	The Crush
2001	The Simpsons	Ralph Wiggum's Singing Voice	New Kids on the Blecch
2007	House M.D.	Opponent	The Jerk
2008	CSI: Crime Scene Investigation	Kip Westerman	Young Man with a Horn
2009	Glee	Hank Saunders	Pilot
2009	The Mentalist	Scotty Sinclair	Throwing Fire
2011	Castle	Brian Morris	The Dead Pool
2012	CSI: NY	Preston Seville, Jr.	Brooklyn Til I Die
2012	The Fresh Beat Band	Prince	Royal Wedding
2012	Jessie	Brody Hinton	The Princess & the Pea Brain
2012	Motu Patlu	Motu	(TV series)
2012	Hawaii Five-0	Todd Dutton	Lekio
