= Dirty Pop: The Boy Band Scam =

2024 American television series

Dirty Pop: The Boy Band Scam is a 2024 three episode documentary film series which explores the career of music mogul Lou Pearlman, who launched the boy bands NSYNC and the Backstreet Boys, and his role in one of longest-running ponzi schemes in United States history.
