= Put Your Arms Around Me (Natural song) =

Single by Natural

from the album Keep It Natural
- Released: United States: Summer 2001 *Germany: March 11, 2002
- Recorded: 2001
- Genre: Pop
- Length: 3:04
- Label: Sony BMG
- Songwriters: Anders Wikström; Fredrik Thomander; Steve Kipner
- Producer: Lou Pearlman

Natural singles chronology
"Put Your Arms Around Me" (2001)	"Let Me Count the Ways" (2002)

"Put Your Arms Around Me" is the debut single performed by American boyband Natural. The single was a success in America, Germany and the UK.

== Background ==
The group teamed up with Claire's to sell the single in their United States stores as a $1 item with a $12 purchase. This allowed "Put Your Arms Around Me" to reach #1 on Billboard's Sales charts, but it still failed to hit top 40. Natural continued promoting the single via a Mall tour in conjunction with JCPenney as well as various low tier music chart shows, such as then FOX Family Countdown and Nickelodeon's 'You Pick' live. "Put Your Arms Around Me" mainly had radio play in their hometown Orlando, but failed to really make an impact elsewhere.

For unknown reason, the official single was released after the promotional blitz ended. This would be one of only two official Natural singles released in the US. After the initial success with Claire's, they decided to release the single in Germany where many boybands had success. The single and the band both became a huge success peaking at #12. The buzz from the single helped their debut album Keep It Natural peak at #2 soon after. "Put Your Arms Around Me" is one of the few songs on Keep It Natural to suffer some censorship. The original chorus lyric went Come lay down beside me though some video versions feature the lyric as Always be beside me. It is not clear why the lyric was changed. During an interview on NBC with Billy Bush, he had teased the group that the chorus lyrics 'I'll be here till the dawn meets the day' was risque yet that line was never changed.

== Track listing ==
European CD Single

1. "Put Your Arms Around Me" (Original Mix)
2. "Put Your Arms Around Me" (JCA Mix)
3. "Put Your Arms Around Me" (Club Mix)
4. "Put Your Arms Around Me" (Video)

US CD Single

1. "Put Your Arms Around Me"
2. "Runaway" [Special Preview Snippet]
3. "(Can't Live Without Your) Love And Affection"

Claire's Promotional Single

1. "Put Your Arms Around Me"
2. "Album Snippets"

== Charts ==
=== Weekly charts ===
Chart (2002)	Peak position
Austria (Ö3 Austria Top 40)	15
Germany (GfK)	12
Switzerland (Schweizer Hitparade)	39
UK Singles (Official Charts)	32

=== Year-end charts ===
Chart (2002)	Position
Germany (Official German Charts)	94

== Certifications ==
Region	Certification	Certified units/sales
United States (RIAA)	Gold	500,000^{^}
^{^} Shipments figures based on certification alone.
