= Marty Klein =

American sex therapist (born 1950)

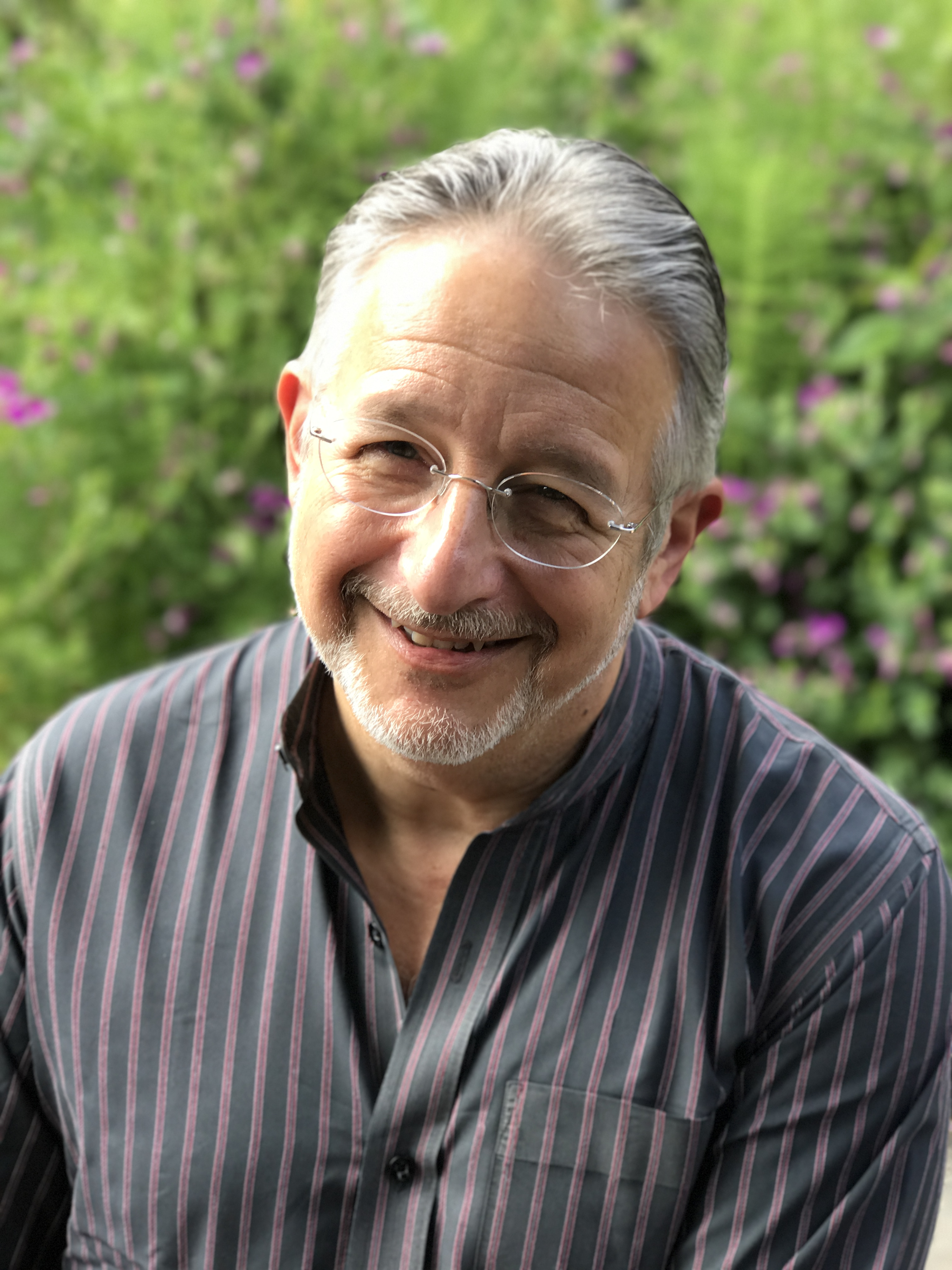
- Marty Klein 2017
- Born: Marty Ralph Klein; New York City, U.S.
- Scientific career
- Fields: Family and marriage therapist Sex therapist
- Website: Marty Klein's Sexual Intelligence Blog, Shop and website YouTube Channel - Sexual Intelligence

Marty Ralph Klein (born 1950) is an American sex therapist, author, educator and public policy analyst. Klein has spent his career supporting the healthy sexual expression of men, women and couples in a wide range of ways. He is critical of censorship, the concepts of sex addiction and porn addiction, as well as the anti-pornography movement. He believes that public policy relating to sexuality should be driven by scientific data rather than emotion, "tradition" or popular but untrue myths. He has been a participant in various state, federal and international court cases dealing with the First Amendment, obscenity, censorship and "harmful to minors" laws.

== Early life ==
Klein grew up in Brooklyn, New York. While still in elementary school he began to play the recorder and to collect stamps, interests he has continued throughout his life. Collecting stamps led to a lifelong interest in geography and history. He later wrote on these topics frequently when he began to lecture and travel internationally.

After graduating from Stuyvesant High School in 1967 he attended Stony Brook University. There he developed a passion for sociology and went on to attend PhD programs in sociology at Indiana University and the University of California.

== Career ==
Klein was trained in the doctoral programs of two different branches of sociology: the first was survey research, the use of statistical analysis to gather data about human behavior in order to understand, correlate and predict it; the second was ethnomethodology, which is the study of how people create meaning as a prelude to creating orderly social interactions and predictable social institutions.

First as a volunteer and then as a staff member, Klein worked for the Santa Barbara branch of Planned Parenthood (1976–1980). While there he became intrigued with the recurring experience of women returning for pregnancy tests multiple times despite being prescribed or given various types of contraception. These women's explanations surprised him: they didn't want to use birth control because they were afraid their partner would think they were a slut, or that they had actually planned to have sex with a stranger they'd just met at a bar.

Planned Parenthood then asked him to run a group for the male partners of women coming to the birth control clinic. He also received a grant from the state Office of Family Planning relating to male sexuality. His interest already piqued by his experiences at the clinic, he began his career in human sexuality.

== Sexuality ==
=== Views on sexuality in the media ===
Klein has been outspoken about the way sexuality is discussed in media outlets. For example, a 2005 New York Times article on the phenomenon of self-help books about sexual positions, sex fantasies and increasingly edgy materials stated that the genre is big business, aimed at women and promoting the idea that "It is a woman's role to ensure that the couple's sex life remains satisfying." Klein disagrees that the promises that these books make about improving sex with oral, anal and fetishistic techniques and information are not what most couples really need to make them happy. "A book called 'How to Get Your Wife to Hug You a Little Bit More' or 'How to Get Your Husband to Slow Down and Caress Your Hair and Love Doing It,' now those are books that would change people's lives," says Klein. Communication is the key to satisfying relationships; things like new positions or removing pornography from a home without your partner's consent is generally not helpful. Klein told the Commonwealth Club that what most adults want out of sex is a combination of "pleasure and closeness," and he encourages people to pay more attention to these, rather than to performance anxiety or how they look.

Klein has criticized the mass media for talking about sexuality in what he claims is an exploitative manner. He calls this the "Oprah-ization" factor, where talk shows like Oprah and Dr. Phil will, for example, put teen prostitutes on stage and talk about how awful it is. What they are really doing, according to Klein, is showing teen girls in skimpy clothing talking about sex, which results in voyeuristic viewers. "If the American media really thought these stories were so terrible it wouldn't give them so much air time ... The key message in American culture is that sex is dangerous. But sex isn't dangerous, bad sexual decision making is dangerous." In an interview with Chip August for Personal Life Media Klein stated, "I think Oprah has single-handedly launched the victim industry in this country," adding that society is now infantilizing women by saying that they are unable to make decisions for themselves, that they are tricked into drinking at parties, that they can't control whether they get drunk or create circumstances of vulnerability. "It's demeaning to people to say that even though you're an adult, we're not going to hold you accountable for your own decision-making," he says.

=== Views on pornography ===
Klein has criticized as unproven the theory of "secondary effects", which posits that people involved with various forms of commercial sexual expression (such as escorts, strip clubs or pornography) will inevitably get involved with other, non-sexual illegal activity such as burglary, vandalism, or assault. He states that there is no evidence for this, but the idea appeals intuitively to many people. Thus instead of looking at the actual causal factors of crime, they seek to ban pornography, strip clubs and other outlets to reduce it. On 20/20 Klein told host John Stossel that 150 years ago most people got married as soon as they reached puberty, which was about 14 or 15 years old. Now most Americans reach puberty around ages 10–12 but they delay marriage into their late 20s.

In December 2016, Klein was a return guest on The Skeptics' Guide to the Universe talking about his book His Porn, Her Pain: Confronting America's Porn Panic with Honest Talk about Sex. He explained that he wrote this book in response to Broadband internet making porn more available - and the accompanying increase in women complaining about their men viewing porn, as well as to help improve sexual literacy of both adults and minors. Host Steven Novella asked Klein if anti-pornography groups are trying to justify their opposition by citing health concerns or were just confused about the science. Klein responded that both are true. "The junk science is there for anyone who wants to use it," he said, noting that the common claims that pornography leads to various social problems lack evidence to support them, as rates of sexual violence, divorce, teen pregnancy and child molestation have all gone down since Broadband pornography became common. He observed that couples that don't have sex anymore are quicker to fight about pornography rather than have a meaningful conversation about problems in their sexual relationships. In addition, he explained that consumer products based on fantasy are mostly about what people want to see, not necessarily what they want to do or experience, as both men and woman fantasize about things they would not do even if given the chance.

=== Views on children and sexuality ===
In a 2012 interview with Your Tango, Klein stated that in America, children are raised to have negative feelings about sex and their sexuality. In Europe most beaches are clothing optional, yet in America nudity on beaches is a crime. Further, he has been critical of laws which make it risky for parents to take photos of their children in the bathtub, or for teenagers to take sexual photos of themselves for their own private use. In addition, he has spoken out against the way he sees teens being treated as a sexually repressed minority, such as the criminalization and punishment of teen "sexting," and the deliberate withholding of sexual information and sexual health products from them.

In a 2015 New York Times interview, Klein was asked how best to talk to children about sex. He responded that it depends on the child, since a younger child will probably not notice the conversation, and older children will need additional information and it is best for parents to respond honestly in a way that reflects their values. A teenager will need to understand what is real and what is fictional entertainment. In all cases, Klein said, it is important to listen, remain calm and make sure the child knows they are not a bad person for having sex questions and that they can ask the parent anything.

Klein has also said that children are learning about sex despite "anti-sex crusaders" and other societal forces trying to keep it from them. It's a parenting issue, Klein told NPR, when children are viewing something that is made for adults. Parents need to educate their children and increase their sexual literacy, so that they understand that what they are seeing on the Internet is fantasy.

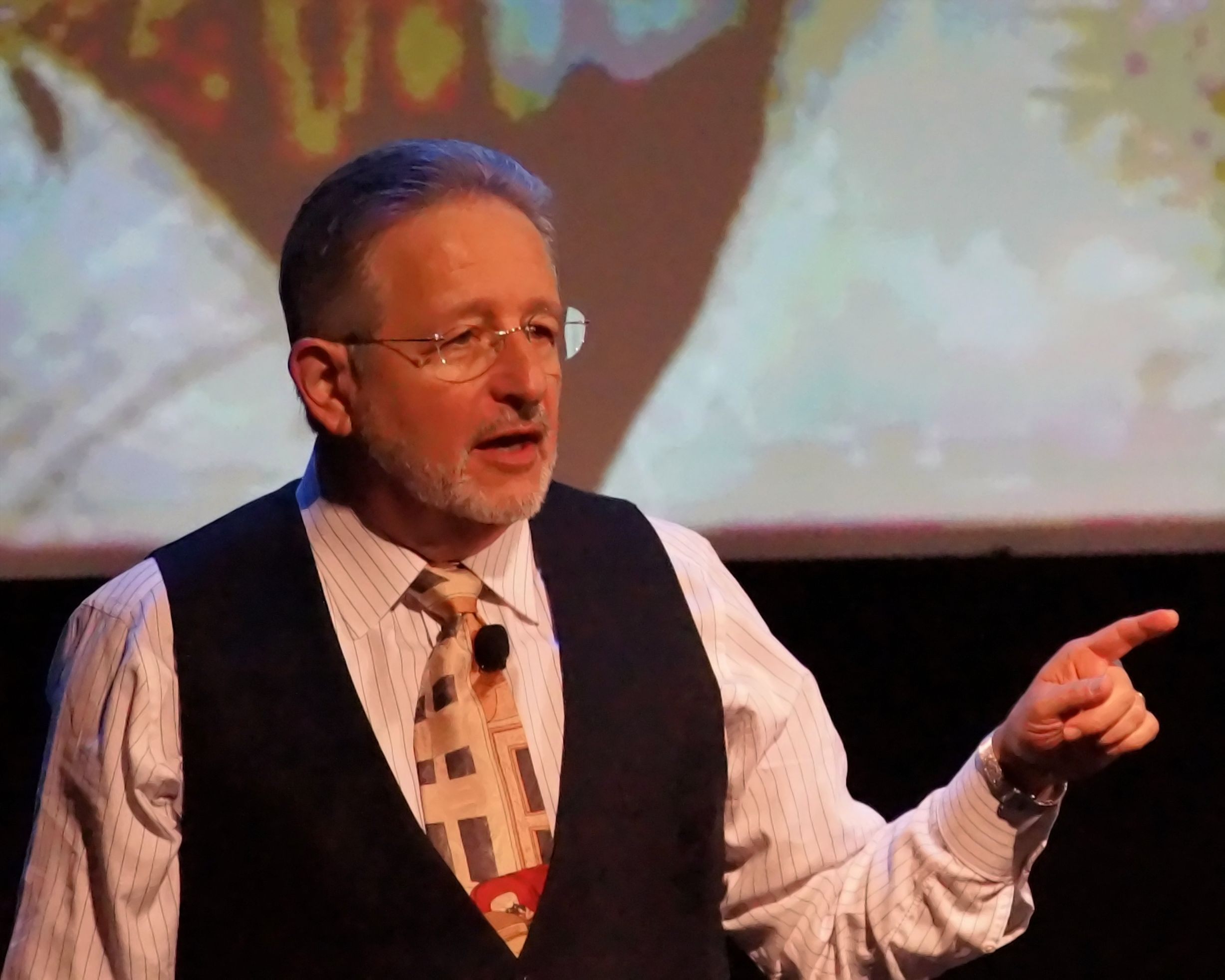
NECSS 2015

== "Sex addiction" ==
When the expression "sex addiction" was coined in the mid-1980s by Patrick Carnes, Klein began to lecture and write against this idea. Klein believed then - and continues to believe - that the concept of "sex addiction" is primarily a set of moralistic judgements dressed up as clinical theory. He has written that the concept is a simplistic explanation of poor sexual decision-making that demonizes sexuality. He says it ignores the roles of culture, religion and the psychological means of sex for individuals while portraying sexual desires as dangerous, often unhealthy and in need of strict control channeled into the one proper form of sexual expression. Klein has reservations that sex-addiction exists and believes that an addiction movement whose agenda is based on false assumptions is harmful to patients and to society, namely: that sexual desires are dangerous, controlling, and not healthy, and that there is only one way to express sexuality.

It is unknown, according to Klein, if the sex addiction movement realized that its ideas would become politically exploited. Regardless of their intentions, this is what activists, government and the media have done in order to discredit the profession of sexology. Issues such as culture, religion, age and disorders must be taken into account. He states that society needs to come up with "sex-positive" models of "sexual health". These models should reflect good education for children as well as for adults, while being sensitive across different cultures. Klein's concerns with the concept of sexual addiction are that it appears to lend scientific credibility to it and implies that "sex is dangerous." Twelve-step programs for sex addiction are of limited value because they are typically self-referred for a problem that any lay person can diagnose. There is no serious evaluation, just "Hello Joe, welcome to the group". Joe may suffer from other problems that will not be helped by a twelve-step program, and may in fact be made worse. Klein told NPR that the idea that going to strip clubs or "watching porn movies can actually be addictive in the same way that heroin is addictive is just silly."

== Court cases ==
Michigan passed a law in 1999 criminalizing the distribution of "sexually explicit" material on the Internet fearing it could fall into the hands of minors. Plaintiffs, which included Marty Klein, challenged the law arguing that it violated the First and Fourteenth Amendments, and it was ruled unconstitutional in June 2001.

In April 2000 Arizona Governor Jane Hull signed law H.B. 2428 which added the Internet to the "harmful to minors" statute. Plaintiffs including Klein sought to have the Internet removed, claiming the law was far too broad contrary to the First Amendment. After reaching the 9th Circuit in June 2002, the Court struck down the law as unconstitutional in American Civil Liberties Union v. Goddard.

In early 2010 an addition was proposed to Massachusetts Senate Bill 997 adding "electronic media" to traditional media in its "harmful to minors" law. This would have criminalized any material posted on the Internet that might be considered harmful if viewed by a minor. The plaintiffs argued that this could "potentially ban constitutionally protected speech about art, literature, sexual health and other topics." The case was heard in October 2010, and in April 2011 the Bill was signed into law, but with the stipulation that it could only be enforced if the "harmful material" was knowingly distributed to a minor. Marty Klein was the only individual among the various institutional plaintiffs.

== Personal life ==
Klein is an extensive traveler and maintains a travel blog for his various trips, including India (2007), Azerbaijan (2009), Viet Nam (2010), Ukraine (2010), China (2011), Brazil (2011), Poland (2012), Myanmar (2013), Italy (2014), Hong Kong (2015), Japan (2015) and Greece (2016). All the photos on his blog are his own.

== Awards ==
Klein has been honored by the following professional associations:

- American Association of Sexuality Educators, Counselors & Therapists: 2007 Sexuality Book of the Year
- California Association of Marriage & Family Therapists Literary Achievement
- Honorary Memberships : Croatian Society for Medical Hypnosis and the Slovenian Society for Hypnotherapy

== Select bibliography ==
=== Books ===
Klein has authored seven books on sexuality. His book America's War on Sex with a foreword by ACLU President Nadine Strosse was honored as 2006's Best Sexuality Book by AASECT. It documents how the issue of sexual regulation is being used by the Religious Right to undermine secular democracy. Klein details what he describes as a well-coordinated, deeply funded war on sexuality which is being fought on many fronts. Klein explores what he sees as the U.S.'s deep-seated anxiety about sexuality and the lengths to which the U.S. government is willing to go to keep its citizens sexually repressed. Klein challenges American society's (and psychotherapy's) assumptions about sexuality; he is particularly critical of what he calls the "Sexual Disaster Industry" and the "Oprah-ization" of psychotherapy and medicine.

- Your Sexual Secrets: When to Keep Them, When & How to Tell. Dutton. 1988. ISBN 978-0525247166.
- Ask Me ... Anything: Dr. Klein Answers the Sex Questions You'd Love to Ask. Simon & Schuster/Fireside. 1996. ISBN 978-0970452634.
- Klein, Marty; Robbins, Riki (1999). Let Me Count the Ways: Discovering Great Sex Without Intercourse. Tarcher. ISBN 978-0874779561.
- Beyond Orgasm: Dare to Be Honest about the Sex You Really Want. Ten Speed Press. 2002. ISBN 978-1587611681.
- America's War on Sex: The Continuing Attack on Law, Lust, and Liberty. Praeger. 2006. ISBN 978-1440801280.
- Sexual Intelligence: What We Really Want from Sex - and How to Get It. HarperCollins. 2012. ISBN 978-0062098580.
- His Porn, Her Pain: Confronting America's Porn Panic with Honest Talk about Sex. Praeger. 2016. ISBN 978-1440852213.

=== Book chapters ===
- Klein, Marty (1992). "Sex Education". In Walker, Eugene C.; Robert, Michael C. (eds.). Handbook of Clinical Child Psychology (2nd ed.). Wiley-Interscience. ISBN 978-0471503613.
- Klein, Marty (1997). "Disorders of Desire". In Charlton, Randolph S. (ed.). Treating Sexual Disorders. Jossey-Bass. pp. 201–236. ISBN 978-0787903114.
- Klein, Marty (2006). "Pornography: What men see when they watch". In Lehman, Peter (ed.). Pornography : film and culture. Rutgers University Press. ISBN 9780813538716.
- Klein, Marty (2015). "Pornography, the narrative of public health; Pornography use as a clinical issue". In Whelehan, Patricia; Bolin, Anne (eds.). International Encyclopedia of Human Sexuality (1st ed.). Wiley-Blackwell. ISBN 978-1405190060. (contributor)
