= Natural (band) =

American boy band

- Origin: Orlando, Florida, U.S.
- Genres: Pop
- Years active: 1999–2004
- Label: Sony Music / Transcontinental
- Past members: Ben Bledsoe; Marc Terenzi; Michael "J" Horn; Michael Johnson; Patrick King

Natural was an American boy band that formed in 1999 and broke up in 2004 consisting of Ben Bledsoe, Marc Terenzi, Michael "J" Horn, Michael Johnson, and Patrick King.

They were best known for their debut single and signature song "Put Your Arms Around Me". They were successful in Germany and the Philippines, releasing two albums and nine singles.

== History ==
The band tried to get signed to a record label on their own but ended up being turned down by most of the major labels. They originally worked with manager Veit Renn and recorded several songs. The band eventually turned to Lou Pearlman, who had had success with some of the biggest boy bands in the world. Renn was not pleased with this and sued. The outcome of the case is unknown, though the band did eventually stay with Pearlman. The band was signed under Transcontinental Records and released albums under that label in the U.S. and Sony BMG abroad.

Unlike most boy bands who are vocal groups, the members of Natural all played instruments. Renn claims he was the one who insisted they learn instruments, spending $75,000 on their training. However certain members such as Horn and Terenzi had been playing since childhood.

In mid-2000, Pearlman hired Steve Kipner to write Natural's first single, "Put Your Arms Around Me". He also struck a deal with teenage accessories store Claire's. The store sold the single as an extra with a $12 or more purchase. A joint tour with the Monkees in conjunction with Claire's followed. However, the single never actually charted on the Billboard Hot 100. The single became No. 3 on the Billboard Hot 100 Single sales chart yet that had little impact on the general public.

In 2001, they provided singing voices for the boy band, Party Posse, in The Simpsons episode titled, "New Kids on the Blecch".

Natural attempted promotions in the U.S. several times in the next few years, though sporadically. Such promotions included several interviews and features in POPstar Magazine, performing in the Macy's Thanksgiving Day Parade 2001, performing medley tribute to the Bee Gees as part of ABC's 'Disco Ball' in 2003, and at one point a mall tour with Saks Fifth Avenue. Yet they still never charted or had successful radio play outside of Orlando.

Pearlman decided to wait on the U.S. release and the band went back to Germany where their first album Keep It Natural was released. The album exploded onto the top of the charts in many territories across the world, and debuted at No. 2 in Germany. The band continued with 8 top 10 singles and multiple Number 1's. The tours grew from Club-sized venues to Arena Tours.

The band began performing at NASA events in 2001. They sang at the launch of the Space Shuttle Endeavour at the start of its 16th flight. They also performed "The Star-Spangled Banner" for the crew of the Space Shuttle Columbia before it launched. They were planning to co-write a space-themed song with astronaut William C. McCool before his death in the Space Shuttle Columbia disaster.

== Other projects ==
- Ben Bledsoe started a solo career in 2005 and released his own indie solo CD Insomniac's Guide to a Lonely Heart, for which he wrote much of the music and lyrics. He toured the US and Germany in support of it. He has also acted in several television shows and films.

== Discography ==
=== Studio albums ===
Year	Title	Chart positions		
Year	Title	GER	AU	CH
2002	Keep It Natural: Released: September 23, 2002; Formats: CD	2	9	72
2004	It's Only Natural: Released: March 15, 2004; Formats: CD	31	-	-

=== Singles ===
Year	Title	Chart positions				Notes
Year	Title	GER	AU	CH	Billboard Hot 100 Singles sales charts	Notes
2001	"Put Your Arms Around Me": Released: 2001; Formats: CD	12	15	39	3	RIAA Certified Gold
2002	"Let Me Count the Ways": Released: June 3, 2002; Formats: CD	11	49	57	-	
2002	"Will It Ever": Released: September 16, 2002; Formats: CD	27	38	-	-	
2003	"Runaway": Released: January 15, 2003; Formats: CD	40	59	-	-	
2003	"Paradise": Released: March 2, 2003; Formats: CD	-	-	-	-	
2003	"What If": Released: November 10, 2003; Formats: CD	34	-	-	-	RIAA Certified Gold
2004	"Let Me Just Fly": Released: February 16, 2004; Formats: CD	23	52	-	-	
2004	"Just One Last Dance": Released: March 1, 2004; Formats: CD	1	5	8	-	
2004	"Why It Hurts": Released: September 13, 2004; Formats: CD	49	-	-	-	
