= Marc Terenzi =

American pop singer

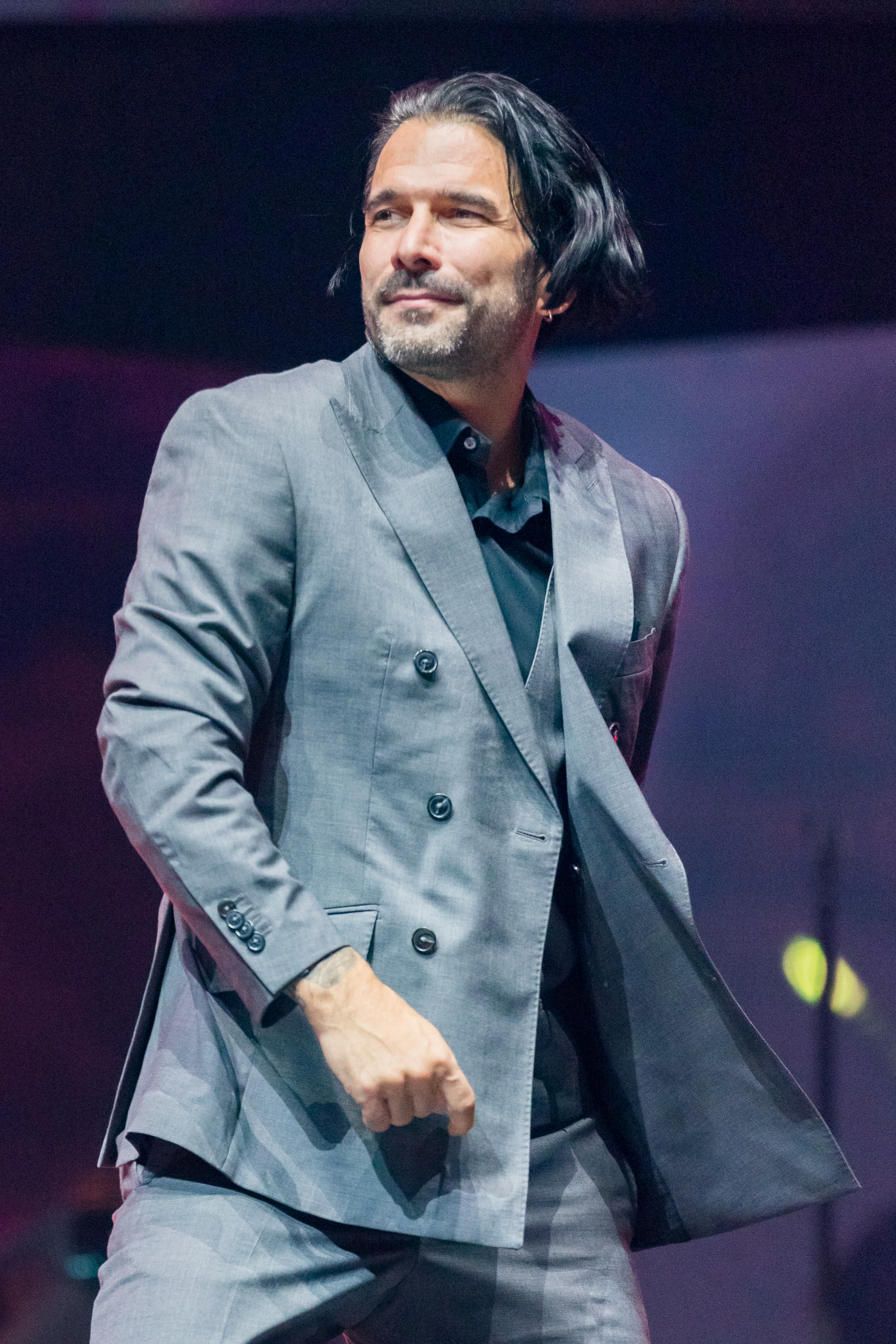
- Terenzi in 2022

Background information
- Born: Marc Eric Terenzi; June 27, 1978 (age 48); Natick, Massachusetts, U.S.
- Origin: Orlando, Florida, U.S.
- Genres: Pop, rock
- Occupations: Singer, songwriter
- Years active: 1999–present
- Formerly of: Natural
- Spouse: Sarah Connor (m. 2004; div. 2010)

Marc Eric Terenzi (born June 27, 1978) is an American pop singer and reality show participant. He was a member of the boy band Natural and was married to German pop/soul singer Sarah Connor from 2004 to 2010. They have a son named Tyler and a daughter named Summer.

== Early life ==
Terenzi was born in Natick, Massachusetts to Italian-American parents Peter and Antoinette. At the age of three, his grandmother began training him at her dance studio. At the age of seven, Terenzi learned how to play piano at his mother's church by teaching himself. He also learned to play guitar himself after his father gave him a guitar for Christmas. At the age of 12, he began to act and host a Boston-based TV show called Studio A.T.V. Terenzi moved to Florida with a friend named Damion with little funds.

== Musical career ==
=== Natural ===
After arriving in Florida, Terenzi took on various jobs including a stint as a bouncer at the House of Blues in Orlando.

Terenzi eventually befriended an actor named Ben Bledsoe. In 1999, the pair soon teamed up with Michael Johnson, Patrick King, and later Josh Horn to form the boy band Natural.

The band created a buzz in the Orlando area eventually attracting attention from boy band mogul Lou Pearlman. Signed with Transcontinental Records they released their first single "Put Your Arms Around Me" in 2001. The single peaked at No. 12 in the German charts.

With American success lacking the group continued to release in Germany. Their debut album Keep It Natural peaked at No. 2 in the German charts. By 2004, they had released two albums and nine singles.

In 2002, Terenzi met German pop singer Sarah Connor. The couple began a relationship covertly despite Pearlman's wishes. Pearlman had rules for his boy bands: "No facial hair, no girlfriends, and no drinking in public." In 2004, Connor became pregnant and the couple was soon engaged. No longer able to keep the relationship secret, Pearlman wanted to replace Terenzi in the band. However, the other members refused and Natural disbanded after their final tour in 2004.

=== Solo career ===
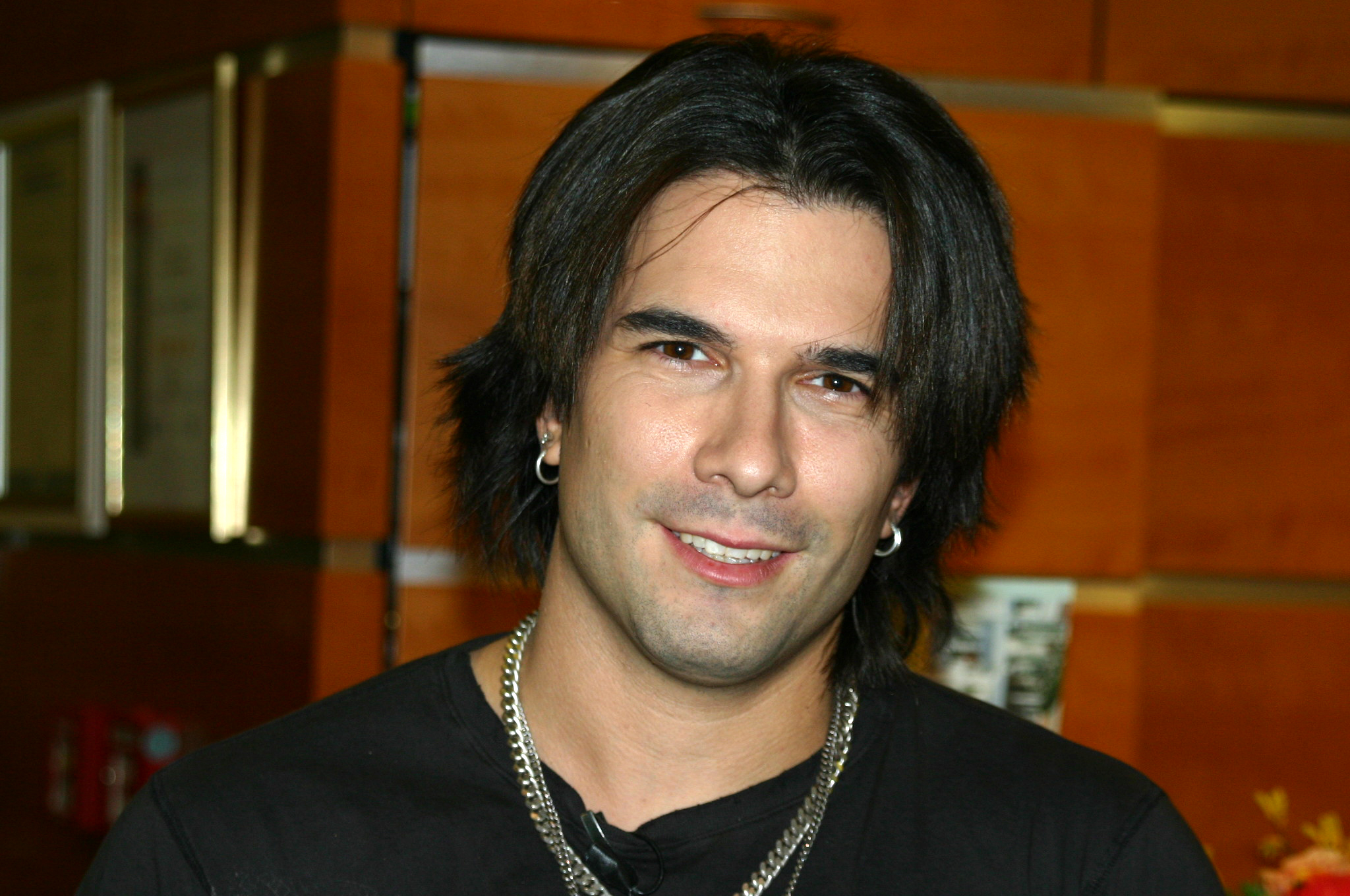
Terenzi in 2005

Terenzi originally intended to form a new band after Natural, named Jaded Rose. However he and the other members had creative differences and his solo career was put on hold until 2005. Together with Connor he participated in a one-off reality show for German TV. The series was called Sarah & Marc in Love and followed their private lives, planning their wedding, and the recording of both their albums.

Terenzi's first solo single was titled "Heat Between the Sheets", which reached the No. 40 in the German charts. His follow-up single "Love to Be Loved By You" peaked at No. 3 on the German charts. The single was a song he played at the wedding ceremony, and thus had a huge audience. It became his signature song.

Terenzi released another single, "Can't Breathe Without You" as well as an album titled Awesome, which peaked at No. 8. To support the album, he embarked on a tour of the same name during 2006.

After the tour, Terenzi released a new single, "You Complete My Soul", in October 2006. It debuted at No. 35 on the German charts. Despite this, second album has yet to be released.

In 2007, after almost two years without an album release Terenzi left a note for his fans indicating he was still pursuing a musical career, "I know it has been a long time since you have heard something new from me. Its only because I have been searching for a while to find out who I really am. Just because you have not heard anything from me recently does not mean that I have stopped working. There is still a lot to come."

=== 2008: Terenzi ===
On May 7, 2008, Terenzi announced via his official MySpace that he had formed a new band, "It is true that I am forming a new band. A project that is more edgy and modern. We plan on taking the new music to a whole new level. music that both my old fans and new fans will like, that is why I will form a new band. We don't know what the name of the project should be but if you have any Ideas let us know. you never know maybe we pick a name you give us. The members that will always be a part of this new band are Myself, Benny Richter and Michael Johnson (Natural). We are bringing a whole lot more edge to our music and are busy working in the studio right now. We have really big plans for this year so get ready for a crazy journey."

On May 21, it was announced Terenzi and his wife would participate in an eight part reality show titled, Sarah and Marc in Love on ProSieben in Germany. The special began airing on July 3, 2008. The documentary follows Connor's comeback as well as the formation of Terenzi's new band, his work on Terenzi Horror Nights, and the work on his new album.

In June 2008, it was announced Terenzi's new group had been formed under the name 'Terenzi'. The group consisted of Michael Johnson, Benny Richter, Kai Stuffel, and Christian Adameit. For their first single the group covered Michael Jackson's "Billie Jean" in a much slower arrangement. "Billie Jean" was scheduled to be released on August 8, 2008. An album titled Black Rose" was set to be released August 28, 2008.

== Non-musical works ==
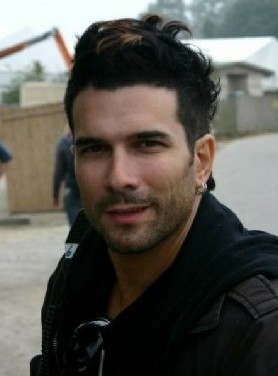
Terenzi in 2010

In 2001, while still in Natural, Terenzi provided the singing voice for US version of The Simpsons character Nelson in the episode "New Kids on the Blecch".

While on musical break, Terenzi was a member of Team Napster in Stefan Raab's Stock Car Crash Challenge at the Arena AufSchalke.

In 2007, Terenzi announced he would be working on a project called "Terenzi Horror Nights" which took place every weekend in October at Europa-Park in Rust, Germany. The idea was to bring the American idea of Halloween to Germany. Terenzi's band performed as well. Terenzi Horror Nights was slated make a return in 2008, 2009, 2010, 2011, and 2012.

In January 2017, he became a contestant in the German television version of Ich bin ein Star – Holt mich hier raus! (the German version of I'm a Celebrity...Get Me Out of Here!) and won it.

== Personal life ==
Terenzi's first child, Tyler Marc Terenzi, was born on February 2, 2004. Terenzi and Connor married the same month. The couple later renewed their vows in July 2005 as part of their reality show Sarah and Marc in Love. Connor gave birth to the couple's second child, Summer Antonia Soraya, on June 23, 2006. In November 2008, the couple announced their separation to the Bild tabloid newspaper.

He has a daughter born in 2011 and a son born in 2015.

== Chart history ==
Year	Title	Chart positions			
Year	Title	GER	AUT	SWI	LIT
2005	Awesome: Debut solo studio album; Released: September 26, 2005; Formats: CD	8	17	11	
2005	Heat Between the Sheets: First single; Released: July 4, 2005; Formats: CD	40	36	48	59
2005	Love to Be Loved by You: 2nd single; Released: September 5, 2005; Formats: CD	3	3	3	13
2005	Can't Breathe Without You: 3rd single; Released: November 18, 2005; Formats: CD	40	56	-	47
2006	You Complete My Soul: 4th single; Released: October 20, 2006; Formats: CD	35	-	-	
2008	Billie Jean: 1st single released with 'Terenzi'; Released: August 8, 2008; Formats: CD	27	-	-	50
2008	Black Roses: Debut album with 'Terenzi'; Released: August 22, 2008; Formats: CD	31	70	35	-

== Awards ==
- 2005: Bravo Otto Gold for Best Male Vocalist
- 2006: Bravo Otto Bronze for Best Male Vocalist
