= Lou Pearlman =

American talent manager and scam artist (1954–2016)

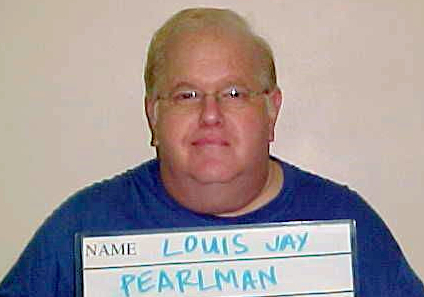
- 2007 arrest mugshot
- Born: Louis Jay Pearlman; June 19, 1954; New York City, U.S.
- Died: August 19, 2016 (aged 62); FCI Miami, Florida, U.S.
- Resting place: New Montefiore Cemetery
- Other names: Big Poppa; An Incognito Johnson
- Education: Queens College
- Criminal charges: conspiracy; money laundering; making false statements
- Criminal penalty: 25 years in prison
- Relatives: Art Garfunkel (cousin)
- Musical career
- Genre: Dance-pop
- Occupations: Record producer, manager, music businessman
- Years active: 1993–2006

Louis Jay Pearlman (June 19, 1954 – August 19, 2016) was an American music manager and convicted felon. He was the person behind many successful 1990s boy bands, having formed and funded the Backstreet Boys. After their massive success, he then developed NSYNC.

In 2006, he was accused of running one of the largest and longest-running Ponzi schemes in United States history, leaving more than $300 million in debts. After attempting to evade capture, Pearlman was apprehended in Bali, Indonesia in June 2007. He pled guilty to conspiracy, money laundering, and making false statements during bankruptcy proceedings. In 2008, Pearlman was convicted and sentenced to 25 years in prison. He died in federal custody in 2016.

== Early life ==
Pearlman was born to Jewish parents in 1954. He was born in Flushing, Queens. His father was a dry-cleaner owner and his mother, a homemaker. Pearlman's home at Mitchell Gardens Apartments was located across from Flushing Airport, where he and childhood friend Alan Gross would watch blimps take off and land. According to his autobiography, Bands, Brands, & Billions, it was during this period that he used his position on his school newspaper to earn credentials and get his first ride in a blimp. This is disputed by Gross, who claims he was the school reporter, and allowed Pearlman to tag along.

Pearlman was cousins with Art Garfunkel whose fame and wealth helped inspire Pearlman's own interest in the music business. As a teenager he managed a band, but when success in music proved elusive, he turned his attention to aviation. During his first year as a student at Queens College, Pearlman wrote a business plan for a class project based on the idea of a helicopter taxi service in New York City. By the late 1970s, he had launched the business based on his business plan, starting with one helicopter. He persuaded German businessman Theodor Wüllenkemper, a Luftwaffe veteran, to train him on blimps and subsequently spent some time at Wüllenkemper's facilities in West Germany learning about the airships.

== Suspicions of insurance fraud and pump and dump ==
Returning to the U.S., Pearlman formed Airship Enterprises Ltd, which leased a blimp to Jordache before actually owning one. He used the funds from Jordache to construct a blimp, which promptly crashed. The two parties sued each other, and seven years later Pearlman was awarded $2.5 million in damages.

On the advice of a friend, Pearlman started a new company, Airship International, taking it public to raise the $3 million he needed to purchase a blimp, falsely claiming that he had a partnership with Wüllenkemper. He leased the blimp to McDonald's for advertising.

Pearlman then relocated Airship International to Orlando, Florida, in July 1991, where he signed MetLife and SeaWorld as clients for his blimps. Airship International suffered when one of its clients left and three of the aircraft crashed. The company's stock, which had once been pumped up to $6 a share, dropped to a price of three cents a share, and the company was shut down.

After he took the company public in 1985, Pearlman became personally and professionally close to Jerome Rosen, a partner at small-cap trading firm Norbay Securities. Based in Bayside, Queens, and frequently in trouble with regulators, Norbay actively traded Airship stock. This sent Airship's stock price consistently higher, enabling Pearlman to sell hundreds of thousands of shares and warrants at ever-higher prices. However, Airship was reporting little revenue, cash flow or net income. In return for keeping his penny stock liquid, Pearlman allegedly paid Rosen handsome commissions, according to a mutual friend, that reached into 'the tens of thousands of dollars' per trade.

== Entertainment industry career ==
Pearlman became fascinated with the success of the New Kids on the Block, who had made hundreds of millions of dollars in record, tour and merchandise sales. He started Trans Continental Records in early 1992 with the intent of mimicking their boy band business model. The record label's first band, the Backstreet Boys, consisted of five unknown performers selected by Pearlman in a $3 million talent search.

Management duties were assigned to a former New Kids on the Block manager, Johnny Wright, and his wife Donna. The Backstreet Boys became the best-selling boy band of all time, with record sales of 130 million, hitting gold, platinum, and diamond in 45 countries. Pearlman and the Wrights were then introduced to NSYNC, which was formed by Chris Kirkpatrick. Pearlman and the Wrights funded and managed NSYNC in a very similar fashion, selling over 70 million records globally.

With these two major successes under his belt, Pearlman had become a music mogul. Other boy bands managed by Pearlman were O-Town (created during the ABC–MTV reality television series Making the Band), LFO, Take 5, Natural, Marshall Dyllon (co-created with country music artist Kenny Rogers) and US5, as well as the girl groups Solid HarmoniE and Innosense, co-managed with Lynn Harless (the mother of NSYNC band member Justin Timberlake). Other artists on the Trans Continental label included Aaron Carter, Jordan Knight, Smilez & Southstar and C-Note.

Pearlman also owned the Church Street Station entertainment complex in Orlando, including a recording studio he called Trans Continental Studios, and a dance studio near Disney World named O-Town.

In 2002, Pearlman and Wes Smith co-wrote Bands, Brands and Billions: My Top 10 Rules for Making Any Business Go Platinum.

=== Band lawsuits ===
With the exceptions of US5 and Marshall Dyllon, all of the musical acts that worked with Pearlman sued him in federal court for misrepresentation and fraud. All cases against Pearlman either have been won by those who have brought lawsuits against him or have been settled out of court.

The members of Backstreet Boys were the first to file a lawsuit against Pearlman, feeling that their contract—under which Pearlman collected as both manager and producer—was unfair, because Pearlman was also paid as a sixth member of the Backstreet Boys (i.e., one-sixth of the band's own income). The band's dissatisfaction began when member Brian Littrell hired a lawyer to determine why the group had received only $300,000 for all of their work while Pearlman and his record label had made millions. Fellow boy band NSYNC was having similar issues with Pearlman, and its members soon followed suit.

At the age of 14, Aaron Carter filed a lawsuit in 2002 that accused Pearlman and Trans Continental of cheating him out of hundreds of thousands of dollars and of racketeering in a deliberate pattern of criminal activity. This suit was later settled out of court.

=== Talent scouting scam scandal ===
In September 2002, Pearlman purchased Mark Tolner's internet-based talent company, Options Talent Group (formerly Emodel and Studio 58), which would subsequently go through several names, including Trans Continental Talent (TCT), Wilhelmina Talent Scouting, Web Style Network (WSN), Fashion Rock, and Talent Rock. Regardless of the name, all incarnations were based on the business model used by Emodel founder Ayman "Alec" Difrawi, himself a convicted con artist, who played a principal role in running Options/TCT/WSN and setting up Fashion Rock. The companies received unfavorable press attention, ranging from questions about their business practices to outright declarations that they were scams. After Hotjobs and Monster.com pulled over a thousand of the company's job ads from their boards, they were further advertised on the Difrawi-founded "Industry Magazine" website.

The Better Business Bureau's opinion about Options/TCT/WSN was negative, citing a "pattern of complaints concerning misrepresentation in selling practices". The New York State Consumer Protection Board issued an alert, naming it the largest example they had found of a photo mill scam. California Department of Industrial Relations Division of Labor Standards Enforcement, also called California Labor Commissioner's Office declared Options/TCT/WSN in violation of California law, and several state agencies were reported to be investigating the company. In Florida, around 2,000 complaints were filed with the then-Attorney General Charlie Crist and the BBB, and an investigation was started by Assistant Attorney General Dowd. However, as the newly appointed Assistant AG MacGregor was unable to find "any substantial violations", no charges were filed. Further complicating matters was that the company had since declared bankruptcy, "leaving no deep pockets from which to collect damages."

By June 2004, Fashion Rock, LLC had filed a civil suit for defamation against some who had criticized Pearlman's talent businesses. The case was dismissed and closed in 2006. One of the accused, a Canadian consumer-fraud expert Les Henderson, successfully pursued a libel lawsuit against Pearlman, Tolner, El-Difrawi and several others.

Fashion Rock, LLC lived on until February 2, 2007, when its assets were sold in Pearlman's bankruptcy proceeding. Difrawi continued filing lawsuits that were all dismissed and was most recently running Expand, Inc. dba Softrock.org aka Employer Network, from the same address as former TCT.

== Ponzi scheme ==
In 2006, investigators discovered Pearlman had perpetrated what was then thought to be the longest-running Ponzi scheme in American history and had defrauded investors out of more than $1 billion, out of which $300 million were still missing as of March 2008. For more than 20 years, Pearlman had enticed individuals and banks to invest in Trans Continental Airlines Inc., TransCon Records, and both companies' parent, Trans Continental International Inc. All three companies existed only on paper—at least until Lou Pearlman's boy bands took off and TransCon Records was profiting from signed acts. After the success of the Backstreet Boys and NSYNC, he turned the groups and their fame into the engine that further expanded his Ponzi scheme. Pearlman used falsified Federal Deposit Insurance Corporation, AIG and Lloyd's of London documents to win investors' confidence in his program titled Employee Investment Savings Account, and he used fake financial statements created by the fictitious accounting firm Cohen and Siegel to secure bank loans.

Note, an unrelated Detroit-based cargo airline, also called Trans Continental Airlines, operated from 1975 to 2000.

=== Investigation and arrest ===
In February 2007, Florida regulators announced that Pearlman's Trans Continental Savings Program was indeed a massive fraud, and the state took possession of the company. Most of the at least $95 million which had been collected from investors was gone. Orange County Circuit Judge Renee Roche ordered Pearlman and two of his associates, Robert Fischetti and Michael Crudelle, to bring back to the United States "any assets taken abroad which were derived from illegal transactions."

Following a flight from officials, Pearlman had been seen in Orlando in late January 2007, and in early February in Germany, including an appearance on German television on February 1. Reportedly he was seen in Russia, Belarus, Israel, Spain, Panama, and Brazil. In early February, an attorney in Florida received a letter from Pearlman sent from Bali. Pearlman was arrested in Indonesia on June 14, 2007, after being spotted by a tourist couple from Germany. He was living in a tourist hotel in Nusa Dua in Bali. Pearlman was indicted by a federal grand jury on June 27, 2007 on charges of conspiracy, money laundering, and filing false bankruptcy.

=== Conviction and sentencing ===
After his conviction and five days before his sentencing in May 2008, Pearlman requested a telephone and an Internet connection two days a week to continue to promote bands. Federal judge G. Kendall Sharp of the U.S. District Court for the Middle District of Florida rejected the request.

On May 21, 2008 Sharp sentenced Pearlman to 25 years in prison on charges of conspiracy, money laundering, and making false statements during a bankruptcy proceeding. Pearlman could reduce his prison time by one month for every million dollars he helped a bankruptcy trustee recover. Sharp also ordered individual investors to be paid before institutions in distributing any eventual assets.

=== Bankruptcy ===
Pearlman and his companies were forced into involuntary bankruptcy in March 2007. Trustees and lenders intended to auction off Pearlman's assets and personal belongings, including a mansion full of well-known works of art and priceless memorabilia. They quickly discovered the art and memorabilia was mostly fake. What could be sold was auctioned through eBay and a traditional bankruptcy auction house.

Church Street Station, a historic train station in downtown Orlando which Pearlman had purchased in 2002, was sold at a bankruptcy auction in April 2007 for $34 million. Several of Pearlman's belongings, including his college degrees, were purchased by The A.V. Club journalist and film critic Nathan Rabin during the eBay auction.

== Accusations by Rich Cronin and Jay Khan ==
In a 2009 interview with Howard Stern, Rich Cronin, the former lead singer of LFO, said that he had only received a fraction of the money owed to him from record sales. Cronin also stated that Pearlman had "wanted to bang everyone" and had attempted to seduce him multiple times. Those statements were never confirmed. Nick Carter, when asked if the claim was true, suggested that bitterness might be a motivating factor for Cronin's accusation.

Despite Cronin's claims, fellow LFO band member, Brad Fischetti, continued to refer to Pearlman as a friend, and expressed sadness at the news of his arrest and imprisonment. In an interview conducted by the Orlando Sentinel, former NSYNC member Lance Bass, when asked about the claim, stated that Pearlman had never behaved inappropriately with them.

Jay Khan, member of the boy band US5, in his autobiography, also related accounts of inappropriate behaviour of sexual nature towards him by Pearlman.

== Death ==
In 2008, Pearlman began his prison sentence with a projected release date of March 24, 2029. However, he suffered a stroke in 2010 while incarcerated. He was diagnosed with an infection of a heart valve. Pearlman had surgery to replace a heart valve a few weeks before his death and had been scheduled for another surgery.

Pearlman died while in custody at the Federal Correctional Institution in Miami, Florida, on August 19, 2016. His autopsy listed his cause of death as infection of the inner lining of the heart. He was buried ten days later on August 29, 2016, in his family’s burial plot. He was 62 years old.

== Documentaries ==
Pearlman was featured in the third season of American Greed in the episode called "Boy Band Mogul" in 2009. The documentary The Boy Band Con: The Lou Pearlman Story, produced by Lance Bass, member of Pearlman's boy band NSYNC, premiered at SXSW on March 13, 2019. It was released on YouTube Premium in April 2019.

On December 13, 2019, Pearlman was the subject of an episode of ABC's 20/20 titled "The Hitman: From Pop to Prison". On July 24, 2024, Pearlman's story was featured in the Netflix's documentary series Dirty Pop: The Boy Band Scam.
