= Tokio Hotel discography =

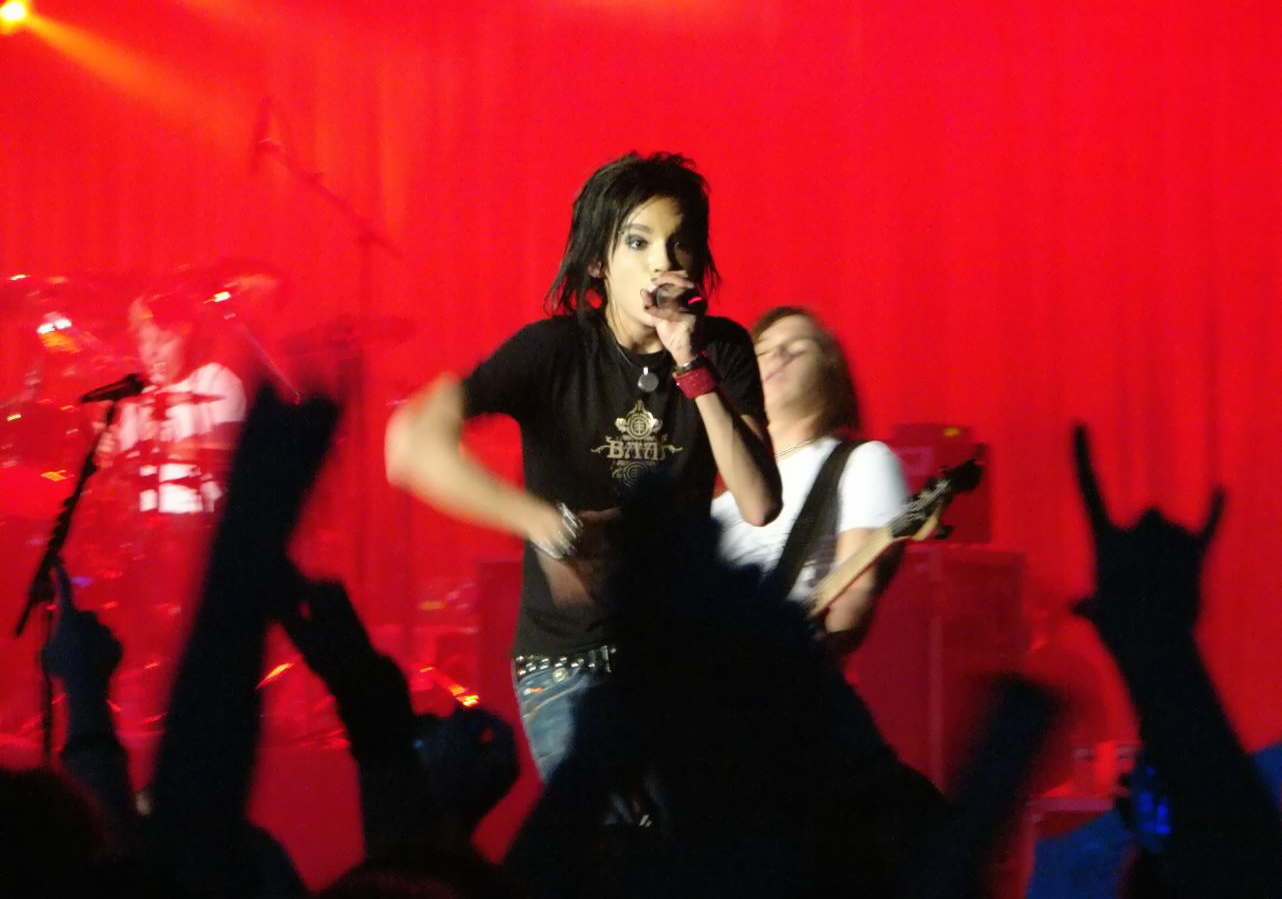
- Tokio Hotel performing in Switzerland, 2006
- Studio albums: 8
- Extended plays: 4
- Live albums: 3
- Compilation albums: 2
- Singles: 41
- Video albums: 5
- Music videos: 39
- Other appearances: 2
- Movies: 1
- Lyric videos: 7

The discography of German band Tokio Hotel consists of eight studio albums, three live albums, four EPs, two compilation albums, forty-one singles, thirty-nine music videos, seven lyric videos, five video albums and one movie. Tokio Hotel was formed in 2001 in Magdeburg, Germany, by singer Bill Kaulitz, guitarist Tom Kaulitz, bassist Georg Listing and drummer Gustav Schäfer. The group's debut single, "Durch den Monsun", entered the German singles chart at Number 15 on 20 August 2005, and reached Number 1 the following week. It also reached Number 1 on the Austrian singles chart. It was followed up with the single "Schrei", which failed to match the success of "Durch den Monsun"; its highest chart position was Number 3 in Austria. The band released their debut album, Schrei, on 19 September 2005. It topped the charts in Germany and Austria, and was certified Platinum by the German and Austrian affiliates of the International Federation of the Phonographic Industry (IFPI) and by the Syndicat National de l'Édition Phonographique (SNEP) in France. In 2006, a third and fourth single, "Rette mich" and "Der letzte Tag", were released; both reached Number 1 in Germany and Austria. The lead single from Tokio Hotel's second album, Zimmer 483, was "Übers Ende der Welt", released on 26 January 2007. It became Tokio Hotel's fourth single to have reached Number 1 on the German and Austrian charts. Zimmer 483 was released on 23 February 2007, and reached the top spot on the German albums chart. The album's second single, "Spring nicht", was released on 7 April, charting at Number 3 in Germany, 7 in Austria, and 21 in Switzerland. Zimmer 483 was certified gold in three countries.

On 4 June 2007, Tokio Hotel released their first English language album, Scream, throughout Europe. In countries with German-speaking populations, it was called Room 483; both names are translations of the group's German language albums. Scream contains English-language versions of songs taken from Schrei and Zimmer 483. "Monsoon", the English-language version of "Durch den Monsun", was the first single taken from the album, and reached Number 8 in France and Italy. "Ready, Set, Go!" was released in the United Kingdom, though it failed to enter the Top 40; it spent one week at Number 77 before dropping out of the charts. It later reached Number 80 in Canada and Number 19 on the Bubbling Under Hot 100 Singles chart in the United States. "An deiner Seite (Ich bin da)", from Zimmer 483 was released in Europe on 16 November 2007, followed by four more English language singles from Scream. "An deiner Seite (Ich bin da)", reached Number 2 in France, which was then followed by two singles released in the US. Their first US single, "Tokio Hotel", contains the tracks "Scream" and "Ready, Set, Go!", and was available exclusively at Hot Topic stores. Their second US single, "Scream America!", was released on 11 December 2007. That too contains "Scream" and "Ready, Set, Go!"; the latter is remixed by AFI's Jade Puget. "Don't Jump" was the final single to have been spawned from Scream.

== Albums ==
=== Studio albums ===
Title	Album details	Peak chart positions										Certifications
Title	Album details	GER	AUT	BEL	CAN	FIN	FRA	ITA	SWE	SWI	US	Certifications
Schrei	Released: 19 September 2005; Label: Island; Formats: CD, digital download	1	1	28	—	36	12	—	—	3	—	BVMI: 3× Gold; BEA: Gold; IFPI AUT: 2× Platinum; IFPI SWI: Gold; SNEP: Platinum
Zimmer 483	Released: 23 February 2007; Label: Island; Formats: CD, digital download	1	2	50	—	13	2	—	—	2	—	BEA: Gold; IFPI AUT: Platinum; IFPI SWI: Gold; SNEP: Gold
Scream	Released: 1 June 2007; Label: Universal; Formats: CD, digital download	—	27	6	6	27	6	2	1	26	39	SNEP: Gold
Humanoid	Released: 2 October 2009; Label: Universal; Formats: CD, digital download	1	8	20	8	9	3	2	8	10	35	FIMI: Gold; SNEP: Gold
Kings of Suburbia	Released: 3 October 2014; Label: Universal; Formats: CD, digital download, LP	2	8	13	—	—	12	5	—	11	—	
Dream Machine	Released: 3 March 2017; Label: Starwatch Entertainment; Formats: CD, digital download, LP	5	10	23	—	—	56	30	—	15	—	
2001	Released: 18 November 2022; Label: Epic; Formats: CD, digital download, LP	10	45	63	—	—	—	—	—	43	—	
Encore	Released: 16 October 2026; Label: Tokio Hotel; Formats: CD, digital download, LP	3	8	13	—	—	76	— (Note: Encore did not enter the Italian Top Albums chart, but peaked at number 15 on the Italian Physical Albums chart.)	—	7	—	
"—" denotes a title that did not chart or was not released in that territory.

=== Compilation albums ===
Title	Album details	Peak chart positions
Title	Album details	SWI
Best of TH	Released: 13 December 2010; Label: Universal; Formats: CD, digital download	77
Darkside of the Sun	Released: 2 February 2011; Label: Universal Japan; Formats: CD, digital download	—
"—" denotes a title that did not chart or was not released in that territory.

=== Live albums ===
Title	Album details	Peak chart positions					
Title	Album details	AUT	BEL (FL)	BEL (WA)	FRA	SPA	SWI
Schrei – Live	Released: 7 April 2006; Label: Island; Formats: DVD	—	—	—	—	—	—
Zimmer 483 – Live in Europe	Released: 30 November 2007; Label: Island; Formats: CD, digital download	67	40	33	61	34	34
Humanoid City Live	Released: 20 July 2010; Label: Stunner Records (Universal); Formats: CD, digital download	58	74	37	21	36	—
"—" denotes a title that did not chart or was not released in that territory.

== Extended plays ==
Title	Details
World Behind My Wall	Released: 29 March 2010; Label: Universal; Formats: Digital download
Feel It All	Released: 27 March 2015; Label: Universal; Formats: CD, digital download
Boy Don't Cry	Released: 20 October 2017; Label: Starwatch Entertainment; Formats: Digital download
Chateau (Remixes)	Released: 17 November 2019; Label: Believe Digital; Formats: Digital download

== Singles ==
=== As lead artist ===
Title	Year	Peak chart positions										Certifications	Album
Title	Year	GER	AUT	BEL (WA)	CAN	FRA	ITA	SWE	SWI	UK	US Bub.	Certifications	Album
"Durch den Monsun"/"Monsoon"	2005	1	1	6	—	8	8	23	69	—	—	BEA: Gold; IFPI AUT: Gold	Schrei / Scream
"Schrei"/"Scream"	2005	5	3	—	—	—	20	—	18	—	—		Schrei / Scream
"Rette mich"/"Rescue Me"	2006	1	1	—	—	—	—	—	6	—	—		Schrei / Scream
"Der letzte Tag"	2006	1	1	—	—	—	—	—	7	—	—	IFPI AUT: Gold	Schrei
"Übers Ende der Welt"/"Ready, Set, Go!"	2007	1	1	26	80	5	—	—	2	77	19		Zimmer 483 / Scream
"Spring nicht"/"Don't Jump"	2007	3	7	39	—	9	—	—	21	—	—		Zimmer 483 / Scream
"An deiner Seite (Ich bin da)"/"By Your Side"	2007	2	6	—	—	2	—	—	—	—	—		Zimmer 483 / Scream
"Heilig"	2008	—	—	—	—	11	—	—	—	—	—		Zimmer 483
"Automatisch"/"Automatic"	2009	5	14	16	—	2	—	36	44	—	—		Humanoid
"Lass uns laufen"/"World Behind My Wall"	2010	—	—	—	—	13	—	—	—	—	—		Humanoid
"Hurricanes and Suns"/"Mädchen aus dem All"	2010	—	—	—	—	—	—	—	—	—	—		Best of TH
"Darkside of the Sun"	2011	—	—	—	—	—	—	—	—	—	—		Humanoid / Darkside of the Sun
"Love Who Loves You Back"	2014	38	39	—	—	88	—	—	65	—	—		Kings of Suburbia
"Feel It All"	2015	—	—	—	—	—	—	—	—	—	—		Kings of Suburbia
"Something New"	2016	—	—	—	—	—	—	—	—	—	—		Dream Machine
"What If"	2016	—	—	—	—	—	—	—	—	—	—		Dream Machine
"Boy Don't Cry"	2017	—	—	—	—	—	—	—	—	—	—		Dream Machine
"Easy"	2017	—	—	—	—	—	—	—	—	—	—		Dream Machine
"Melancholic Paradise"	2019	—	—	—	—	—	—	—	—	—	—		Non-album single
"When It Rains It Pours"	2019	—	—	—	—	—	—	—	—	—	—		Non-album single
"Chateau"	2019	—	—	—	—	—	—	—	—	—	—		Non-album single
"Durch den Monsun 2020"/"Monsoon 2020"	2020	—	—	—	—	—	—	—	—	—	—		2001
"Berlin" (featuring VVAVES)	2020	—	—	—	—	—	—	—	—	—	—		2001
"White Lies" (featuring VIZE)	2021	13	17	—	—	—	—	—	30	—	—	IFPI AUT: Platinum	2001
"Here Comes the Night"	2021	—	—	—	—	—	—	—	—	—	—		2001
"Bad Love"	2022	—	—	—	—	—	—	—	—	—	—		2001
"HIM"	2022	—	—	—	—	—	—	—	—	—	—		2001
"When We Were Younger"	2022	—	—	—	—	—	—	—	—	—	—		2001
"Happy People" (featuring Daði Freyr)	2022	—	—	—	—	—	—	—	—	—	—		2001
"Your Christmas"	2023	42	—	—	—	—	—	—	—	—	—		Non-album single
"The Weekend"	2024	—	—	—	—	—	—	—	—	—	—		Non-album single
"Home" (from Kaulitz & Kaulitz)	2024	—	—	—	—	—	—	—	—	—	—		Non-album single
"Hands Up"	2025	—	—	—	—	—	—	—	—	—	—		Non-album single
"How to Love"	2025	—	—	—	—	—	—	—	—	—	—		Non-album single
"Changes"	2025	—	—	—	—	—	—	—	—	—	—		Encore
"California Nights"	2026	—	—	—	—	—	—	—	—	—	—		Encore
"Memory Lane"	2026	—	—	—	—	—	—	—	—	—	—		Encore
"Without You"	2026	—	—	—	—	—	—	—	—	—	—		Encore
"Dye My Hair"	2026	—	—	—	—	—	—	—	—	—	—		Encore
"Perfect Ending"	2026	—	—	—	—	—	—	—	—	—	—		Encore
"1990s"	2026	—	—	—	—	—	—	—	—	—	—		Encore

=== Promotional singles ===
Title	Year	Album
"Darkside of the Sun" (Live)	2010	Humanoid City Live
"Run Run Run"	2014	Kings of Suburbia

=== As featured artist ===
Title	Year	Peak chart positions	Album
Title	Year	GER	Album
"Behind Blue Eyes" (VIZE featuring Tokio Hotel)	2021	—	Behind Blue Eyes
"Sorry Not Sorry" (Badchieff featuring Tokio Hotel)	2021	—	Chieff Loves You
"Fahr mit mir (4x4)" (Kraftklub featuring Tokio Hotel)	2022	27	Kargo
"Miss It (At All)" (Nicklas Dee featuring Tokio Hotel)	2025	—	Miss It (At All)
"Carthasis" (KUKO featuring Tokio Hotel)	2026	—	CATHARSIS

== Other appearances ==
Song	Year	Album	Notes
"Instant Karma!"	2007	Instant Karma: The Amnesty International Campaign to Save Darfur	Originally recorded by John Lennon.
"Strange"	2010	Almost Alice	Recorded with Kerli.
"If I Die Tomorrow"	2012	Dirty Bass	Bill Kaulitz only. Recorded with Far East Movement.
"I Am"	2014	FIFA 14 Soundtrack	Recorded with Rock Mafia, Wyclef Jean, David Correy.
"Imagine"	2015	Unicef	Bill Kaulitz only.
"Vogel aus Gold"	2018	Ciao	Bill Kaulitz only. Recorded with Nisse.
"Behind Blue Eyes"	2021	Behind Blue Eyes	Originally recorded by the Who. Recorded with VIZE.
"Sorry Not Sorry"	2021	Chieff Loves You	Recorded with Badchieff.
"Fahr mit mir (4x4)"	2022	Kargo	Recorded with Kraftklub.
"Colors of the Wind"	2024	A Whole New Sound	Originally recorded by Judy Kuhn.
"Fata Morgana"	2024	Fata Morgana	Recorded with Nina Chuba.
"Miss It (At All)"	2025	Miss It (At All)	Recorded with Niklas Dee.
"Na und?!"	2026	WE LOVE UDO	Originally recorded by Udo Lindenberg.
"Catharsis"	2026	CATHARSIS	Recorded with KUKO.

== Videos ==
=== Music videos ===
Title	Year	Director(s)
"Durch den Monsun"	2005	Sandra Marschner
"Schrei"	2005	Zoran Bihac
"Rette mich"	2006	Katja Kuhl
"Der letzte Tag"	2006	Daniel Warwick & Christopher Häring
"Wir schließen uns ein"	2006	Daniel Warwick & Christopher Häring
"Übers Ende der Welt"	2007	Daniel Warwick & Christopher Häring
"Spring nicht"	2007	Jörn Heitmann
"Monsoon"	2007	Daniel Siegler
"Ready, Set, Go!"	2007	Christopher Häring & Daniel Warwick
"An deiner Seite (Ich bin da)"	2007	Hoffmann, Benzner, Roth & Jost
"By Your Side"	2007	Hoffmann, Benzner, Roth & Jost
"1000 Meere"	2007	Daniel Siegler
"1000 Oceans"	2007	Daniel Siegler
"Scream"	2007	Katja Kuhl
"Don't Jump"	2008	Ingo Georgi
"Automatisch"	2009	Craig Wessels
"Automatic"	2009	Craig Wessels
"World Behind My Wall"	2010	Daniel Wolfe
"Lass uns laufen"	2010	Daniel Wolfe
"Hurricanes And Suns"	2010	Hoffmann, Benzner, Roth & Jost
"Mädchen aus dem All"	2010	Hoffmann, Benzner, Roth & Jost
"Run, Run, Run"	2014	Gianluca Fellini
"Girl Got a Gun"	2014	Kris Moyes
"Love Who Loves You Back"	2014	Marc Klasfeld
"Feel It All"	2015	Mattias Erik Johansson
"Something New"	2017	Kris Moyes
"What If"	2017	Barış Aydınlı
"Boy Don't Cry"	2017	Barış Aladağ
"Easy"	2017	Dominik Wilzok
"Melancholic Paradise"	2019	Unknown
"When It Rains It Pours"	2019	Barış Aladağ
"Chateau"	2019	Barış Aladağ
"Durch den Monsun 2020"	2020	Kris Moyes
"Monsoon 2020"	2020	Kris Moyes
"White Lies"	2021	Barış Aladağ
"Behind Blue Eyes"	2021	Barış Aladağ
"Bad Love"	2022	Laurent Noichl
"HIM"	2022	Barış Aladağ
"When We Were Younger"	2022	Unknown
"Just a Moment"	2022	Unknown
"Your Christmas"	2024	Unknown
"Hands Up"	2025	Unknown
"How to Love"	2025	Unknown
"Changes"	2025	Unknown
"California Nights"	2026	Unknown
"Memory Lane"	2026	Unknown
"Without You"	2026	Unknown

=== Lyric videos ===
Title	Year
"Melancholic Paradise"	2019
"Chateau"	2019
"Durch den Monsun 2020"	2020
"Berlin"	2020
"White Lies"	2021
"Here Comes The Night"	2021
"When We Were Younger"	2022
"Happy People"	2022
"The Weekend"	2024
"Home"	2024

== Concert tours ==
Headlining

- Schrei Tour (2005–2006)
- Zimmer 483 Tour (2007)
- 1000 Hotels World Tour (2008)
- Welcome to Humanoid City Tour (2010–2011)
- Feel It All World Tour (2015)
- Dream Machine Tour (2017–2018)
- Melancholic Paradise Tour (2019–2020)
- Beyond the World Tour (2023–2024)
- The Tour (2025)
- Arena Tour (2026)

== Summer Camp ==
- Tokio Hotel Summer Camp (2018)
- Tokio Hotel Summer Camp (2019)

== Anniversary Shows ==
- Durch den Monsun 20 Jahre - The Big Anniversary Show (2025)

== Movie ==
- Tokio Hotel – Hinter Die Welt (2017)
- Netflix Exclusive: "Kaulitz & Kaulitz" (2024)

== Video albums ==
Title	Album details	Peak chart positions						Certifications
Title	Album details	GER	AUT	BEL FL	BEL WAL	FRA	ITA	Certifications
Leb die Sekunde – Behind the Scenes	Released: 2 December 2005; Label: Universal (#060075302533); Format: DVD	13	1	—	—	—	8	BVMI: 2× Platinum; IFPI AUT: Platinum; SNEP: 2× Platinum
Schrei – Live	Released: 7 April 2006; Label: Universal (#060249854971); Format: DVD	—	1	—	—	—	3	IFPI AUT: Gold; SNEP: 3× Platinum
Zimmer 483 – Live in Europe	Released: 30 November 2007; Label: Universal (#060251742984); Format: DVD	—	3	1	2	—	2	SNEP: Diamond
Tokio Hotel TV – Caught on Camera	Released: 5 December 2008; Label: Universal (#426017874001); Format: DVD	—	5	2	4	6	1	SNEP: 2× Platinum
Humanoid City Live	Released: 20 July 2010; Label: CHERRY TREE (#060249854971); Format: DVD	—	5	3	1	1	2	
"—" denotes a title that did not chart or was not released in that territory.
