= List of songs recorded by Tokio Hotel =

This is a comprehensive list of songs by German rock band Tokio Hotel. Since forming in 2001, by the name of Devilish, the band have released seven studio albums, two live albums and two compilation albums . This list does not contain live versions or remixes released by the band.

== Original songs ==
Song title	Album(s) / Single(s)	First released
"Schrei"	Schrei / Schrei	2005
"Durch den Monsun"	Schrei / Durch den Monsun	2005
"Leb' die Sekunde"	Schrei	2005
"Rette mich"	Schrei / Rette mich	2005
"Freunde bleiben"	Schrei	2005
"Ich bin nich' ich"	Schrei	2005
"Wenn nichts mehr geht"	Schrei	2005
"Lass uns hier raus"	Schrei	2005
"Gegen meinen Willen"	Schrei	2005
"Jung und nicht mehr jugendfrei"	Schrei	2005
"Der letzte Tag"	Schrei / Der letzte Tag	2005
"Unendlichkeit"	Schrei	2005
"Beichte"	Schrei - so laut du kannst	2006
"Schwarz"	Schrei - so laut du kannst	2006
"Thema nr. 1 - demo 2003"	Schrei - so laut du kannst	2006
"Frei im freien Fall"	Der letzte Tag	2006
"Wir schließen uns ein"	Der letzte Tag	2006
"Übers Ende der Welt"	Zimmer 483 / Übers Ende der Welt	2007
"Totgeliebt"	Zimmer 483	2007
"Spring nicht"	Zimmer 483 / Spring nicht	2007
"Heilig"	Zimmer 483 / Heilig	2007
"Wo sind eure Hände"	Zimmer 483	2007
"Stich ins Glück"	Zimmer 483	2007
"Ich brech aus"	Zimmer 483	2007
"Reden"	Zimmer 483	2007
"Nach dir kommt nichts"	Zimmer 483	2007
"Wir sterben niemals aus"	Zimmer 483	2007
"Vergessene Kinder"	Zimmer 483	2007
"An deiner Seite (Ich bin da)"	Zimmer 483 / An deiner Seite (Ich bin da)	2007
"Hilf mir fliegen"	Übers Ende der Welt	2007
"In die Nacht"	Zimmer 483 / Spring nicht	2007
"Scream"	Scream / Scream	2007
"Ready, Set, Go!"	Scream / Ready, Set, Go!	2007
"Monsoon"	Scream / Monsoon	2007
"Love Is Dead"	Scream	2007
"Don't Jump"	Scream / Don't Jump	2007
"On the Edge"	Scream	2007
"Sacred"	Scream	2007
"Break Away"	Scream	2007
"Rescue Me"	Scream	2007
"Final Day"	Scream	2007
"Forgotten Children"	Scream	2007
"By Your Side"	Scream	2007
"Black"	Ready, Set, Go!	2007
"Live Every Second"	Ready, Set, Go!	2007
"Geh"	An deiner Seite (Ich bin da)	2007
"1000 Meere"	An deiner Seite (Ich bin da)	2007
"1000 Oceans"	Scream (USA bonus track)	2008
"Raise Your Hands"	Scream (USA Hot Topic Edition bonus track)	2008
"Komm"	Humanoid (German)	2009
"Sonnensystem"	Humanoid (German)	2009
"Automatisch"	Humanoid (German) / Automatisch	2009
"Lass uns laufen"	Humanoid (German) / Lass uns laufen	2009
"Humanoid (German Version)"	Humanoid (German)	2009
"Für immer jetzt"	Humanoid (German)	2009
"Kampf der Liebe"	Humanoid (German)	2009
"Hunde"	Humanoid (German)	2009
"Menschen suchen Menschen"	Humanoid (German)	2009
"Alien (German Version)"	Humanoid (German)	2009
"Geisterfahrer"	Humanoid (German)	2009
"Zoom"	Humanoid (German)	2009
"Träumer"	Humanoid (German)	2009
"Hey Du"	Humanoid (German)	2009
"That Day"	Humanoid (German) & Humanoid (English)	2009
"Screamin'"	Humanoid (German) & Humanoid (English)	2009
"Attention"	Humanoid (German) & Humanoid (English) (both iTunes bonus content)	2009
"Down On You"	Humanoid (German) & Humanoid (English) (both iTunes bonus content)	2009
"Noise"	Humanoid (English)	2009
"Dark Side of the Sun"	Humanoid (English)	2009
"Automatic"	Humanoid (English) / Automatic	2009
"World Behind My Wall"	Humanoid (English) / World Behind My Wall	2009
"Humanoid (English Version)"	Humanoid (English)	2009
"Forever Now"	Humanoid (English)	2009
"Pain of Love"	Humanoid (English)	2009
"Dogs Unleashed"	Humanoid (English)	2009
"Human Connect to Human"	Humanoid (English)	2009
"Alien (English Version)"	Humanoid (English)	2009
"Phantomrider"	Humanoid (English)	2009
"Zoom Into Me"	Humanoid (English)	2009
"Love and Death"	Humanoid (English)	2009
"Hey You"	Humanoid (English)	2009
"In Your Shadow (I Can Shine)"	Humanoid (German) & Humanoid (English) (US iTunes bonus content)	2009
"Hurricanes and Suns"	Best Of Tokio Hotel	2010
"Mädchen aus dem All (2003)"	Best Of Tokio Hotel	2010
"Feel It All"	Kings of Suburbia / Feel It All	2014
"Stormy Weather"	Kings of Suburbia	2014
"Run, Run, Run"	Kings of Suburbia	2014
"Love Who Loves You Back"	Kings of Suburbia / Love Who Loves You Back	2014
"Covered In Gold"	Kings of Suburbia	2014
"Girl Got a Gun"	Kings of Suburbia	2014
"Kings of Suburbia"	Kings of Suburbia	2014
"We Found Us"	Kings of Suburbia	2014
"Invaded"	Kings of Suburbia	2014
"Never Let You Down"	Kings of Suburbia	2014
"Louder Than Love"	Kings of Suburbia	2014
"Masquerade"	Kings of Suburbia	2014
"Dancing In the Dark"	Kings of Suburbia	2014
"The Heart Get No Sleep"	Kings of Suburbia	2014
"Great Day"	Kings of Suburbia	2014
"Something New"	Dream Machine	2017
"Boy Don't Cry"	Dream Machine / Boy Don't Cry	2017
"Easy"	Dream Machine / Easy	2017
"What If"	Dream Machine	2017
"Elysa"	Dream Machine	2017
"Dream Machine"	Dream Machine	2017
"Cotton Candy Sky"	Dream Machine	2017
"Better"	Dream Machine	2017
"As Young As We Are"	Dream Machine	2017
"Stop Babe"	Dream Machine	2017
"Melancholic Paradise"	Melancholic Paradise	2019
"When it Rains it Pours"	When It Rains It Pours	2019
"Chateau"	Chateau	2019
"Durch den Monsun 2020"	2001 / Monsoon 2020 / Durch den Monsun 2020	2020
"Monsoon 2020"	Monsoon 2020	2020
"Berlin" (feat. VVAVES)	2001 / Berlin	2020
"White Lies" (feat. VIZE)	2001 / White Lies	2021
"Here Comes the Night"	2001 / Here Comes the Night	2021
"Bad Love"	2001 / Bad Love	2022
"HIM"	2001 / HIM	2022
"When We Were Younger"	2001 / When We Were Younger	2022
"Ain't Happy"	2001	2022
"Just a Moment" (feat. VVAVES)	2001	2022
"Hungover You"	2001	2022
"Smells Like Summer" (feat. ÁSDÍS)	2001	2022
"Happy People" (feat. Daði Freyr)	2001 / Happy People	2022
"Dreamer"	2001	2022
"Runaway"	2001	2022
"Another Lover"	2001	2022
"Back to the Ocean"	2001	2022
"Your Christmas"	Your Christmas	2023
"The Weekend"	The Weekend	2024
"Home" (from Kaulitz & Kaulitz)	Home	2024
"Hands Up"	Hands Up	2025
"How to Love"	How to Love	2025
"Changes"	Encore / Changes	2025
"California Nights"	Encore / California Nights	2026
"Memory Lane"	Encore / Memory Lane	2026
"Without You"	Encore / Without You	2026
"Call Me by Your Name"	Encore	2026
"Lover's Cove"	Encore	2026
"Wanderlust"	Encore	2026
"Shout 2 the Universe"	Encore	2026
"Homesick"	Encore	2026
"Dye My Hair"	Encore	2026
"Terminal 1"	Encore	2026
"Perfect Ending"	Encore	2026

== Other appearances ==
Song title	Album(s) / Single(s)	First released
"Instant Karma!"	Instant Karma: The Amnesty International Campaign to Save Darfur	2007
"Strange" featuring Kerli	Almost Alice (Alice In Wonderland soundtrack album)	2010
"If I Die Tomorrow" with Far East Movement	Dirty Bass	2012
"I Am" featuring Rock Mafia, Wyclef Jean, David Correy	FIFA 14 Soundtrack	2014
"Vogel aus Gold" with Nisse	Ciao	2018
"Behind Blue Eyes" featuring VIZE	Behind Blue Eyes	2021
"Sorry Not Sorry" with Badchieff	Chieff Loves You	2021
"Fahr mit mir (4x4)" with Kraftklub	Kargo	2022
"Colors of the Wind" from Pocahontas	A Whole New Sound	2024
"Miss It (At All)" with Niklas Dee	Miss It (At All)	2025
"Na und ?!"	WE LOVE UDO	2026
"Catharsis" with KUKO	CATHARSIS	2026
