= Kaulitz (surname) =

Kaulitz is a German surname. Notable people with the surname include:

- Bill Kaulitz (born 1989), German singer, member of Tokio Hotel
- Tom Kaulitz (born 1989), German guitarist, member of Tokio Hotel
