= I'm Not Okay =

I'm Not Okay may refer to:

- "I Am Not Okay", a song by American singer Jelly Roll
- I'm Not OK, the debut EP by Tokio Hotel lead singer Bill Kaulitz
- "I'm Not Okay (I Promise)", the lead single and fifth track from My Chemical Romance's second studio album, Three Cheers for Sweet Revenge
