= I'm Not OK =

EP by BILLY
- Released: 20 May 2016
- Recorded: 2015–2016
- Genre: Electropop, synth-pop
- Length: 19:32
- Language: English
- Label: De-Code LTD
- Producer: Bill Kaulitz; Tom Kaulitz; Shiro Gutzie; Pionear

Singles from I'm Not OK
- 1. "Love Don't Break Me" Released: 29 April 2016; 2. "Not Over You" Released: 26 November 2016; 3. "California High" Released: 18 May 2018

I'm Not OK is the debut EP by Tokio Hotel lead singer Bill Kaulitz, released through iTunes on 20 May 2016 under the moniker BILLY. It contains 5 songs. The official artwork was designed by German designer Andrew Brawl, who is also a good friend of Kaulitz. The EP leaked on the Internet in April, nearly a month before official release due to iTunes music releasing system issues.

== Background ==
The songs were originally written by Kaulitz for Tokio Hotel's upcoming album at the time, Kings of Suburbia, but were found personal and not fitting for Tokio Hotel's sound. Kaulitz decided to release them as a solo artist. He describes the EP as the diary of his feelings after a heartbreak he experienced. Each song will feature something special. For "Love Don't Break Me," it was a short film, a photo book and a photo exhibition.

== Mini-tour ==
The EP was supported by a mini tour across 5 cities: Los Angeles, Mexico City, Berlin, Paris and Milan. Tickets for the events were very limited and sold out just in hours after being available. The events included meet and greet with Kaulitz, fan questions, art exhibition, book signing and private listening session of EP.

== Singles ==
The first and lead single off the EP is "Love Don't Break Me", released 29 April 2016. The video was shot back in October 2015 in Los Angeles by Shiro Gutzie and Davis Factor and premiered with the single release.

== Track listing ==
No.	Title	Writer(s)	Length
1.	"Love Don't Break Me"	Bill Kaulitz, Tom Kaulitz, Shiro Gutzie, Morgan Karr, Pionear	3:36
2.	"Not Over You"	Bill Kaulitz, Tom Kaulitz, Shiro Gutzie, Pionear	3:57
3.	"Odds Are Against Us"	Bill Kaulitz, Tom Kaulitz, Shiro Gutzie, Pionear	4:00
4.	"California High"	Bill Kaulitz, Tom Kaulitz, Philipp Albinger, Shiro Gutzie, Morgan Karr	4:27
5.	"Forbidden Love"	Bill Kaulitz, Tom Kaulitz, Shiro Gutzie, Pionear	3:32
Total length:			19:32

== Music videos ==
Title	Year	Director(s)
"Love Don't Break Me"	2016	Shiro Gutzie + Davis Factor
"Not Over You"	2016	Shiro Gutzie
"California High"	2018	Shiro Gutzie
