= Rette mich (Tokio Hotel song) =

2006 single by Tokio Hotel

Single by Tokio Hotel

from the album Schrei
- Language: German
- English title: "Rescue Me"
- B-side: "Thema Nr. 1"
- Released: 10 March 2006
- Genre: Emo • alt rock
- Length: 3:49
- Label: Island, Universal Music
- Songwriters: Dave Roth, David Jost, Patrick Benzer
- Producers: Peter Hoffmann, David Jost, Dave Roth, Patrick Benzner

Tokio Hotel singles chronology
"Schrei" (2005)	"Rette mich" (2006)	"Der letzte Tag" (2006)

"Rette mich" (English: "Rescue Me") is a song by German rock band Tokio Hotel, released as the third single from their debut album, Schrei (2005). The single version of "Rette mich", re-recorded as lead singer Bill Kaulitz's voice began to deepen, formed part of the Schrei - so laut du kannst release. The band later recorded an English-language version of the song, entitled "Rescue Me", for their third studio album Scream.

== Music video ==
The video involves the band playing in what looks like a boarded-up, abandoned room. The walls of the room start closing in on the second verse. The main storyline of the video however, is about lead singer Bill Kaulitz singing in a similar room, alone. As he gets up, he finds it hard to keep his balance - he keeps sliding around everywhere. He tries to grab hold of objects numerous times, but in the end gives up and slides; at this moment the rest of the band appears in the room.

== Track listings ==
- German CD single
1. "Rette mich" (video version) – 3:50
2. "Rette mich" (acoustic version) – 3:42
- German maxi-CD single
1. "Rette mich" (video version) – 3:49
2. "Rette mich" (acoustic version) – 3:42
3. "Thema Nr. 1" (demo 2003) – 3:14
4. "Rette mich" (video) – 3:48
5. "Durch den Monsun" (live video) – 5:42

== Charts ==
=== Weekly charts ===
Chart (2006–2007)	Peak position
Austria (Ö3 Austria Top 40)	1
Europe (Eurochart Hot 100)	6
Germany (GfK)	1
Russia (TopHit)	63
Switzerland (Schweizer Hitparade)	6
Ukraine (TopHit)	214

=== Year-end charts ===
Chart (2006)	Position
Austria (Ö3 Austria Top 40)	33
Germany (Media Control GfK)	48
