= Fahr mit mir (4x4) =

Single by Kraftklub featuring Tokio Hotel

from the album Kargo
- Released: July 8, 2022
- Length: 4:05
- Label: Vertigo; Capitol
- Songwriters: Felix Brummer; Konrad Betcher; Karl Schumann
- Producers: Kraftklub; Flo August; Konrad Betcher

Kraftklub singles chronology
"Wittenberg ist nicht Paris" (2022)	"Fahr mit mir (4x4)" (2022)	"Teil dieser Band" (2022)

Tokio Hotel singles chronology
"When We Were Younger" (2022)	"Fahr mit mir (4x4)" (2022)	"Happy People" (2022)

"Fahr mit mir (4x4)" is a single from German indie band Kraftklub's fourth studio album Kargo, featuring a guest appearance from German rock band Tokio Hotel. It was released on July 8, 2022.

== Music video ==
The music video shows Kraftklub in a room singing the song whilst the camera is rotating counter-clockwise and zooming out to show Bill and Tom Kaulitz sitting in a Lada Niva 4x4, the name of which is included in the lyrics. The band are eventually seen singing and dancing around the 4x4. Later shots show the 4x4 rolling over with Kaulitz and two members of the band inside. The 4x4 is seen driving around with a white flag attached to the rear with Kaulitz and Felix Brummer singing by the side of it.

== Track listing ==
- Digital download

#	Title	Length
1	"Fahr mit mir (4x4)" feat. Tokio Hotel	4.05
2	"Teil dieser Band" [Klub Version]	3.36

== Charts ==
Chart (2022)	Peak position
Germany (GfK)	27

== Release history ==
Region	Date	Format	Label	Ref.
Worldwide	July 8, 2022	Digital download	Vertigo Records	
