= Bill Kaulitz =

German singer (born 1989)

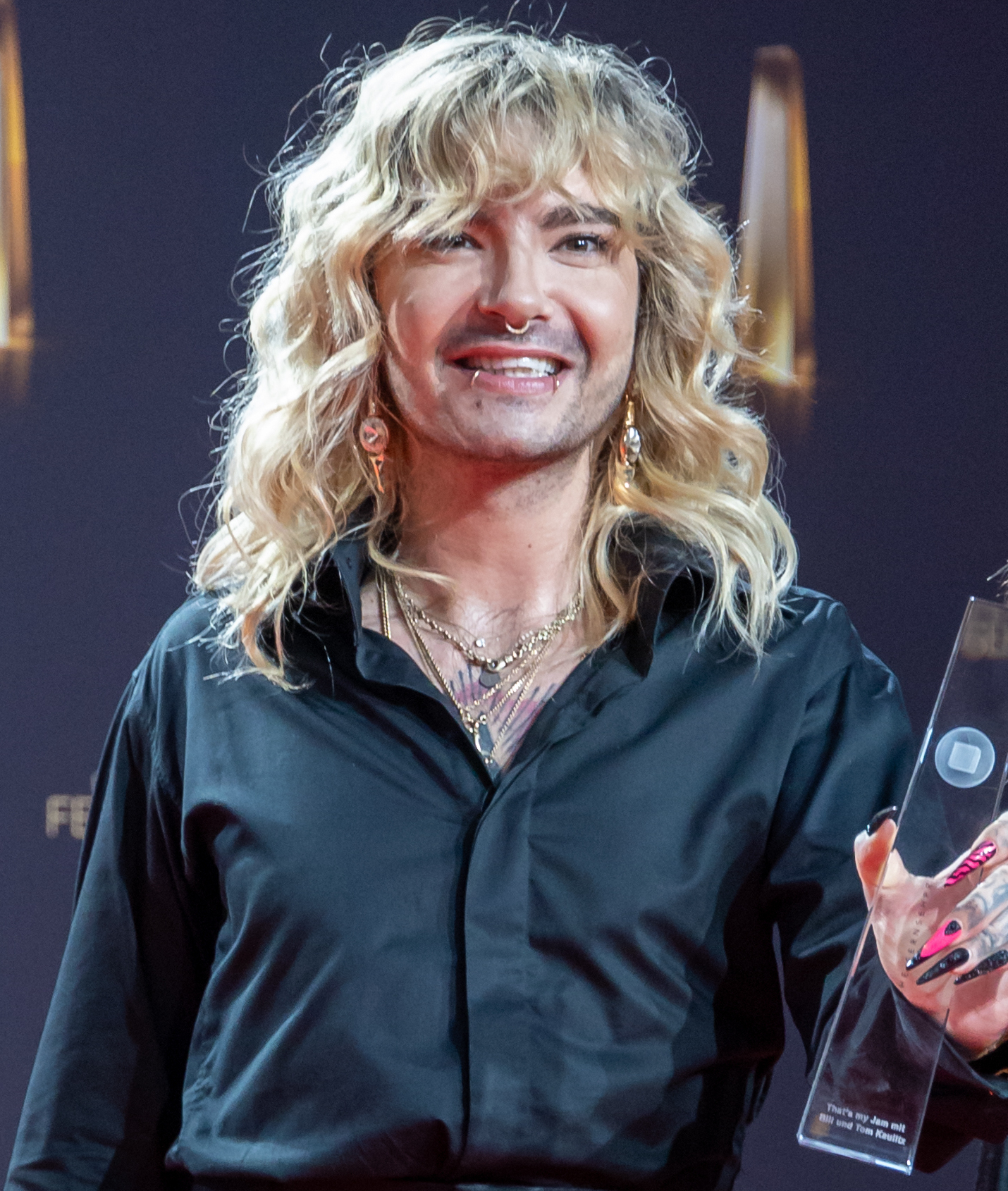
- Kaulitz in 2023

Background information
- Also known as: Billy
- Born: 1 September 1989 (age 37); Loitsche, East Germany
- Genres: Pop rock; alternative rock; electropop; synth-pop
- Occupations: Singer; songwriter
- Years active: 2001–present
- Label: UMG
- Member of: Tokio Hotel
- Website: tokiohotel.com

Bill Kaulitz (German pronunciation: [bɪl ˈkaʊlɪts]; born 1 September 1989), also known as Billy (or mononymously known as Bill) for his solo project, is a German singer, songwriter, podcaster, model and author. He is best known for his work as the lead vocalist of the pop rock band Tokio Hotel.

== Early life ==
Kaulitz was born on 1 September 1989 in Leipzig, East Germany. He has an identical twin brother, Tom, who is older by ten minutes. His parents, Simone Kaulitz and Jörg W., separated when Kaulitz was seven years old. Simone married Gordon Trümper, the guitarist from German rock band Fatun on 1 August 2009, after dating for 12 years.

Kaulitz showed an early interest in singing, as did Tom in playing guitar. Trümper noticed the twins' musical inclinations, and helped the twins to start their own band. According to Kaulitz in several interviews, he and Tom started writing music at the age of seven years.

== Career ==
=== Early musical career (1999–2003) ===
At the age of 10, the brothers began performing live in Magdeburg near their hometown of Loitsche. They played small shows and while their audiences enjoyed them, they were largely unknown. The band lacked a drummer and bass player and the twins relied on a keyboard to fill in other instrumental sounds.

The year the brothers turned 12, they met Georg Listing (then 14) and Gustav Schäfer (then 13) in the audience of one of their shows. Listing and Schäfer were friends and, after the show, having liked what they heard and saw, made an offer to join. The band was promptly renamed "Devilish" due to an article published at the time that referred to their "devilishly great" sound. The four continued to perform, but aside from being featured on a small-time German news program somewhere between late 2002 and early 2003, Devilish were not going anywhere until Kaulitz auditioned on the reality TV talent show "Star Search."

=== First releases ===
This continued until 2005 when Jost arranged a meeting between the band and Universal Music Group's Interscope Records and Tokio Hotel was signed. They began working immediately, releasing their debut LP Schrei ("Scream") later that year. Their first single from Schrei was "Durch den Monsun" ("Through the Monsoon"), which reached #1 in Germany within a month of its release.

=== First tour and growing success ===
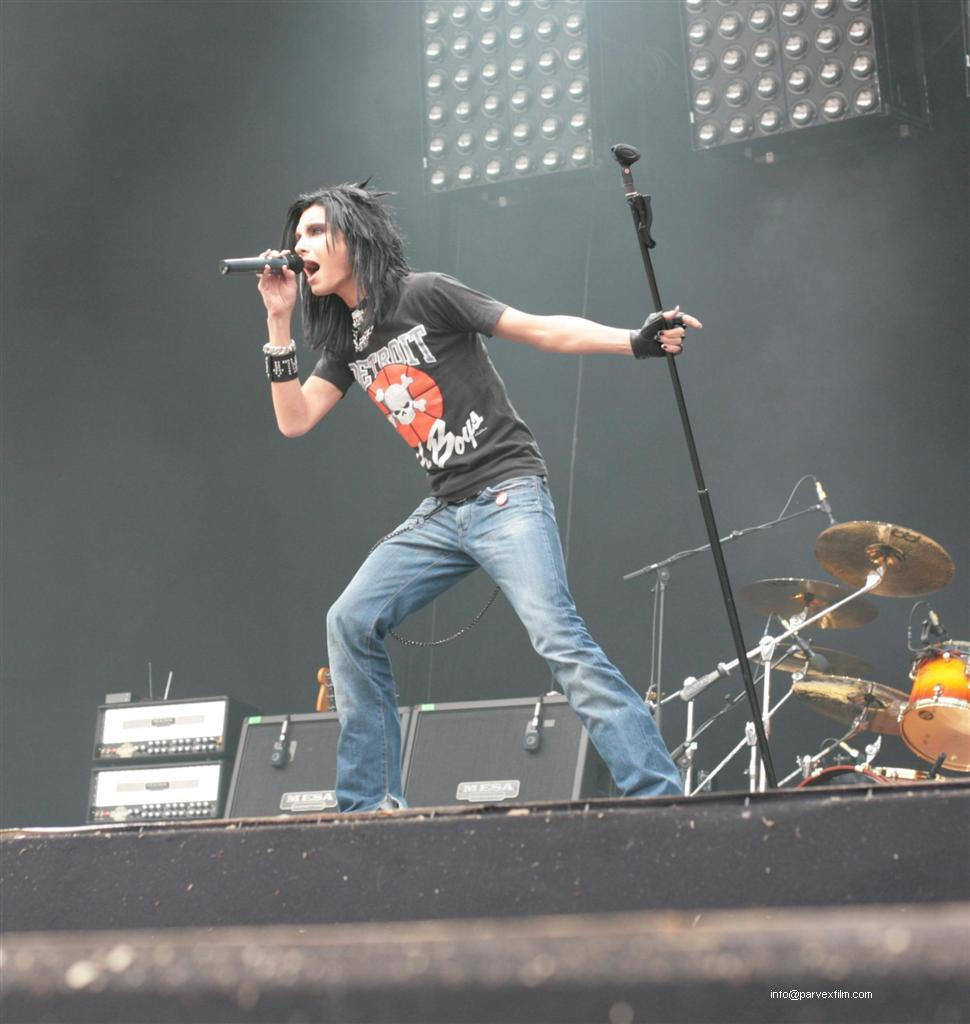
Kaulitz performing in Hessisch-Lichtenau, Germany, in 2006

Tokio Hotel launched their debut tour in Germany, to support the release of Schrei and its singles. They toured Germany and also recorded a live DVD. On stage, Kaulitz was noted and well known for his energetic style and harmonizing with the fans (he would frequently let the audience sing verses instead of him).

In 2006, Kaulitz voiced the role of Arthur in the first part of the German version of the film Arthur and the Invisibles.

Tokio Hotel were a household name in Germany at this point, and this compelled the band to return to the studio. After the success of Schrei, Tokio Hotel began working on their second album, Zimmer 483 (Room 483), released in February 2007. The album spawned three singles initially: "Übers Ende der Welt" ("Over the End of the World" – released as "Ready, Set, Go!"), "Spring nicht" ("Don't Jump"), and "An deiner Seite (Ich bin da)" ("By Your Side (I am there)" – released as "By Your Side"). A fourth single, "Heilig" ("Holy" – released as "Sacred"), was released in 2008.

To support the release of Zimmer 483, Tokio Hotel began a continental tour of Europe, spawning another live DVD and a large publicity boost.

=== International breakthrough (2007–2008) ===
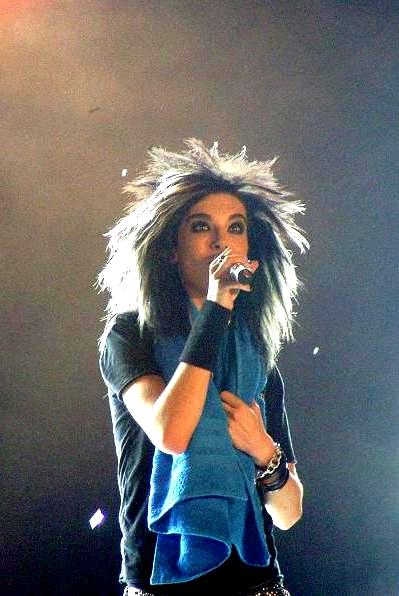
Kaulitz performing in Moscow, Russia, on 27 September 2007

As Tokio Hotel's fanbase increased in the Western part of the world, Kaulitz and the band decided to re-record select songs from both Schrei and Zimmer 483 for a new English-language LP so that fans around the world could understand the band's songs. The result of these re-recorded songs was Tokio Hotel's debut English album, titled Scream. The album was released in Europe in mid-2007 (albeit with the name Room 483, the literal translation of Zimmer 483, to express its continuity with that album), however it did not reach release in the West until mid-2008.

Scream spawned four singles, including "Scream", "Monsoon" (the translated version of "Durch den Monsun" however the title was not 100% literally translated), "Don't Jump" (the translated version of "Spring Nicht"), and "Ready, Set, Go!" (the translated version of "Übers Ende der Welt", again not a literal translation of the title). Scream was moderately successful internationally, and to support the release, Tokio Hotel left Europe for the first time in their careers, and flew to the United States.

In February 2008, Tokio Hotel first set foot in North America to play five shows, starting in Canada and ending in New York. Tokio Hotel were the first German act since Nena to gain success internationally, and maintain their status. The U.S. tour was a success, but when they went back to Europe for their 1000 Hotels Tour, disaster struck.

=== 1000 Hotels tour and medical complications ===
The 1000 Hotels Tour began in Brussels, Belgium, on 3 March 2008, and was set to continue through the Netherlands, Luxembourg, France, Spain, Portugal, Italy, and Scandinavia, ending on 9 April. However eleven days after the start of the tour, on 14 March, Kaulitz began to experience voice problems in the middle of a show in Marseille, France. He let the audience sing more often and the band cut their set down from twenty-one to sixteen songs.

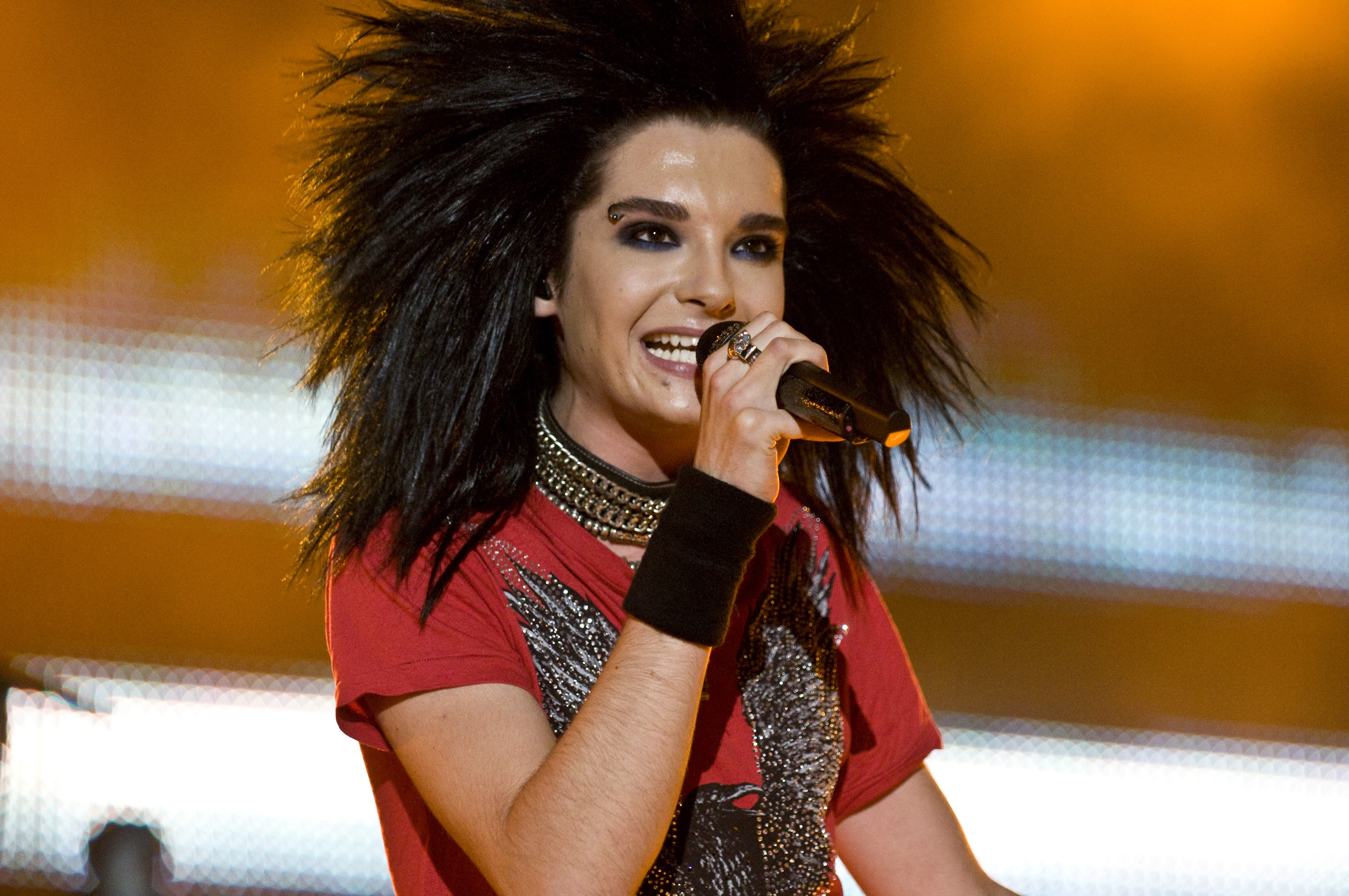
Kaulitz on 27 June 2008

Two days after the incident in France, Tokio Hotel cancelled a show in Lisbon, Portugal moments before it was to commence. The band, with the exception of Kaulitz, came on the stage and apologized for the show being cancelled. They explained that Kaulitz was sick and was being flown back to Germany to see a specialist: he had played forty-three shows without a break and had developed an untreated throat infection. The infection caused a cyst to develop on the singer's vocal cords that had to be removed via larynx surgery on 30 March. Kaulitz was unable to speak for ten days afterwards and had to undergo speech therapy for one month.

By May 2008, Kaulitz had sufficiently recovered and Tokio Hotel rescheduled the 1000 Hotels Tour dates, adding several open-air concerts. The tour concluded on 13 July 2008 in Werchter, Belgium, and, despite the surgery and time taken off, was deemed a success.

=== Humanoid (2008–2011) ===
Over 2008 and 2009, Tokio Hotel returned to the recording studio to record their second English album and third German album. The result was Humanoid, which was a much more techno-oriented release and a new sound. Humanoid was released on 6 October 2009, and just short of a month later Tokio Hotel picked up the "Best Group" award at the EMAs in Berlin on 5 November. Humanoid has so far spawned two singles, "Automatic"/"Automatisch", released in September 2009, and "World Behind My Wall"/"Lass uns laufen" (meaning "Let Us Run"), to be released in January 2010.

=== Kings of Suburbia and solo projects (2012–2016) ===
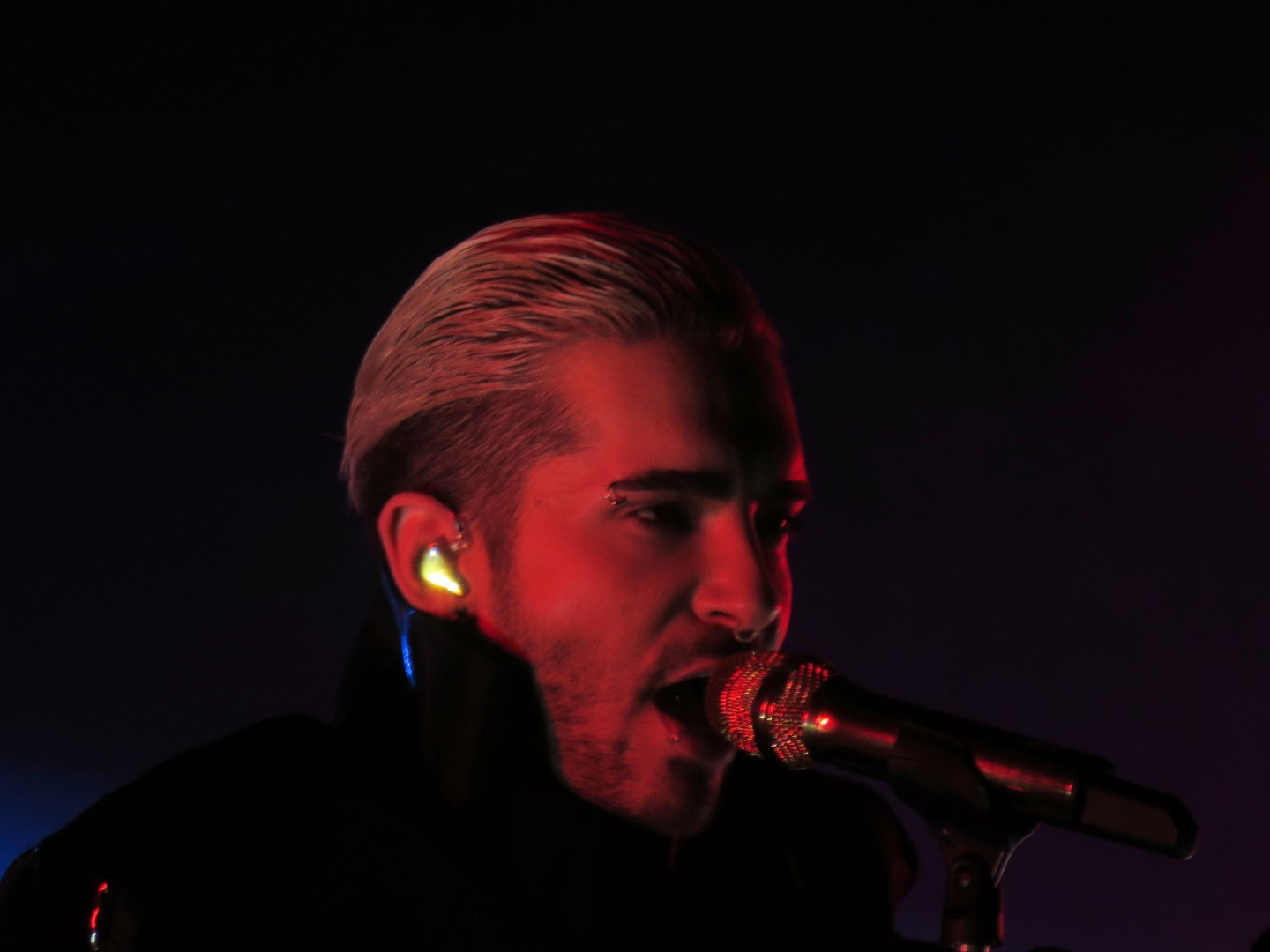
Kaulitz performing in Zurich, Switzerland, in 2017

In May 2012, Kaulitz was featured on the song "If I Die Tomorrow" by Far East Movement on their album Dirty Bass.

Tokio Hotel announced their fifth studio album, Kings of Suburbia, in 2013 and it was released 3 October 2014.

In 2016, Kaulitz announced his plans for a solo project under the moniker "Billy" (stylized as BILLY). His first EP, I'm Not OK, was released on 20 May.

=== Dream Machine (2016–2018) ===
Tokio Hotel announced their sixth studio album, Dream Machine, in 2016 and it was released on 3 March 2017.

In October 2018, Kaulitz was featured on the song "Vogel aus Gold" by Nisse on his album Ciao.

=== Melancholic Paradise tour and autobiography (2018–2020) ===
Tokio Hotel announced their upcoming album and their tour, Melancholic Paradise, in 2018. The singles "Melancholic Paradise", "When It Rains It Pours" and "Chateau" were respectively released on 1 February 2019, 5 April 2019, and 17 November 2019.

The LATAM leg of the Melancholic Paradise tour was cancelled on 12 March 2020 due to the COVID-19 pandemic.

In August 2020, Bill announced that the singles "Durch den Monsun" and "Monsoon" would be re-recorded and released early October 2020 to celebrate the single's 15th anniversary, as well as more songs from the upcoming album, and more from his solo career. "Durch den Monsun 2020" and Monsoon 2020 were respectively released on 2 October 2020 and 16 October 2020.

Kaulitz wrote his first autobiography, Career Suicide: Meine ersten dreißig Jahre ("My first thirty years"), which was written in German, and was due for release on 4 January 2021, however this was pushed back to 1 February 2021. An English version of the book is also in production.

Kaulitz announced on 4 December 2020 via his Instagram story that Tokio Hotel will release their new single "Berlin" on 11 December 2020, featuring a guest appearance from Canadian singer VVAVES.

=== Beyond the World tour and 2001 (2020–present) ===
Tokio Hotel announced their new tour for Autumn 2021, Beyond the World, on 7 December 2020. This was later postponed until April 2022 due to the COVID-19 pandemic, and again until April 2023 due to the Russo-Ukrainian War.

Kaulitz announced on 11 January 2021 via Tokio Hotel's official Facebook and Instagram accounts their new single "White Lies", which will feature a guest appearance from German EDM duo VIZE. This was released on 15 January 2021. Other 2021 releases by Tokio Hotel include The Who cover "Behind Blue Eyes"; also with VIZE in May, "Sorry Not Sorry" with German rapper Badchieff in August, and "Here Comes the Night" in October.

Tokio Hotel announced their new single "Bad Love", which was originally to be released on 21 January 2022, but was postponed due to Bill and Tom Kaulitz being unable to arrive in Germany in time for the promotion. This was eventually released on 4 February 2022 with new singles "HIM", "When We Were Younger", "Fahr mit mir (4x4)" with Kraftklub and "Happy People" with Daði Freyr following on 8 April 2022, 27 May 2022, 8 July 2022 and 21 October 2022 respectively. Their seventh studio album, 2001, was released on 18 November 2022.

== Other work ==
In 2009, he reprised the role of the German voice of Arthur again for the Arthur and the Invisibles sequel. In 2010, Kaulitz and Tokio Hotel teamed up with Kerli to record the song Strange for the film Alice In Wonderland and accompanying Almost Alice soundtrack.

Kaulitz, alongside his brother Tom, modeled for a PETA.de photoshoot, protesting the use of animals as a source of entertainment. He also modeled for Dsquared in early 2010, making his debut as a model.

Kaulitz appeared as a jury member on the 10th season of Deutschland sucht den Superstar in 2013. In 2019, he co-hosted Queen of Drags with his sister-in-law Heidi Klum. Bill and Tom Kaulitz host a podcast called Kaulitz Hills and have been featured in the Netflix reality show Kaulitz & Kaulitz since 2024.

In 2022, Kaulitz created a subscription-based OnlyFans account, with proceeds from the subscriptions being donated to the International Marine Mammal Project.

In 2026, Kaulitz will make his film debut in the indie horror film Brute 1986, a sequel to the 2025 film Brute 1976. He will be playing Johnny, a member of an '80s heavy metal band called Leather Kobra, whose music video shoot will be cut short by a family of serial killers.

== Personal life ==
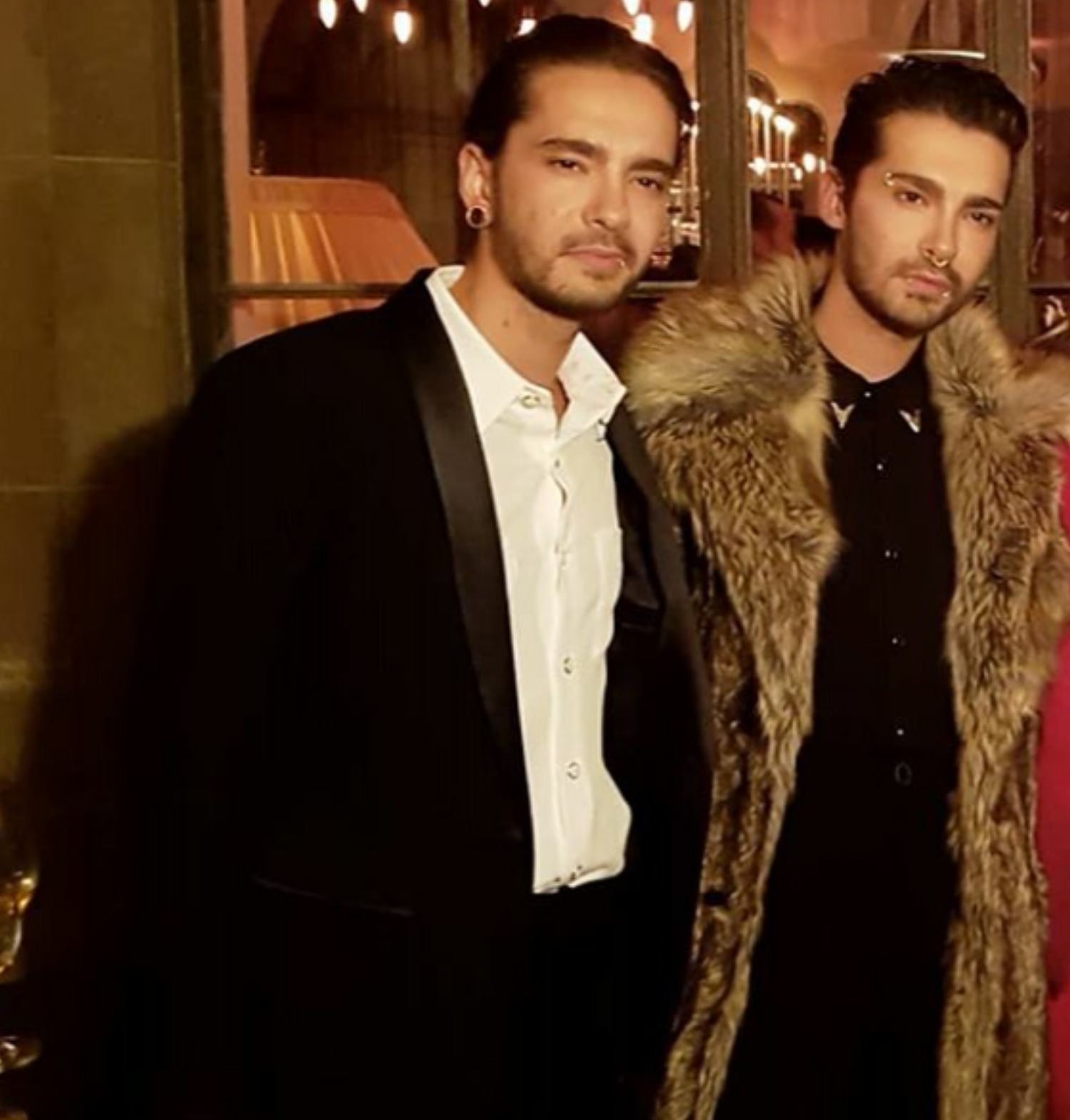
Tom (left) and Bill Kaulitz in 2018

Kaulitz and his identical twin brother, Tom, used to live in Hamburg but moved to Los Angeles in October 2010 in response to an incident involving stalkers and a robbery. They have also stated that it is easier for them to create their new album, as it is closer to their manager David Jost. Tom married model Heidi Klum in 2019, whom Bill is close friends with.

After moving to L.A. Kaulitz and the band took a year off and "didn't do anything" before finding inspiration in L.A. nightlife.

Der Spiegel writes that discussion of Kaulitz's sexuality is an "eternal topic", and Kaulitz says it is one of the first questions he is typically asked, but he previously avoided discussing it. In November 2014, Kaulitz blogged about love, labels and his sexuality; Kaulitz did not put a label on his sexual orientation, but offered: "Maybe I'm just about to meet someone who changes my life forever and, if that happens, does it really matter what gender they are?" Kaulitz became more public about his sexuality and relationships in the 2020s, with his relationship with model Marc Eggers being heavily featured on Kaulitz & Kaulitz.

Kaulitz was a supporter of Angela Merkel and favored the CDU in the 2017 German federal election.

=== Stalking incident ===
In late 2008–early 2009 several female stalkers pursued the band relentlessly, even following his twin brother Tom Kaulitz to his parents' home in Germany and attacked the twins' mother. The issue seemed to end after Tom allegedly hit one of the stalkers at a gas station in April 2009 and drove off. However, an article in Bild stated that the issue had resurfaced and that Tom Kaulitz may stand trial for assault. In late December 2009, the charges against Tom were dropped and he pressed charges himself—against the girl he allegedly hit—on grounds of stalking. Kaulitz cited a break-in at their home in Germany as a deciding factor in their move to the United States.

== Public image ==
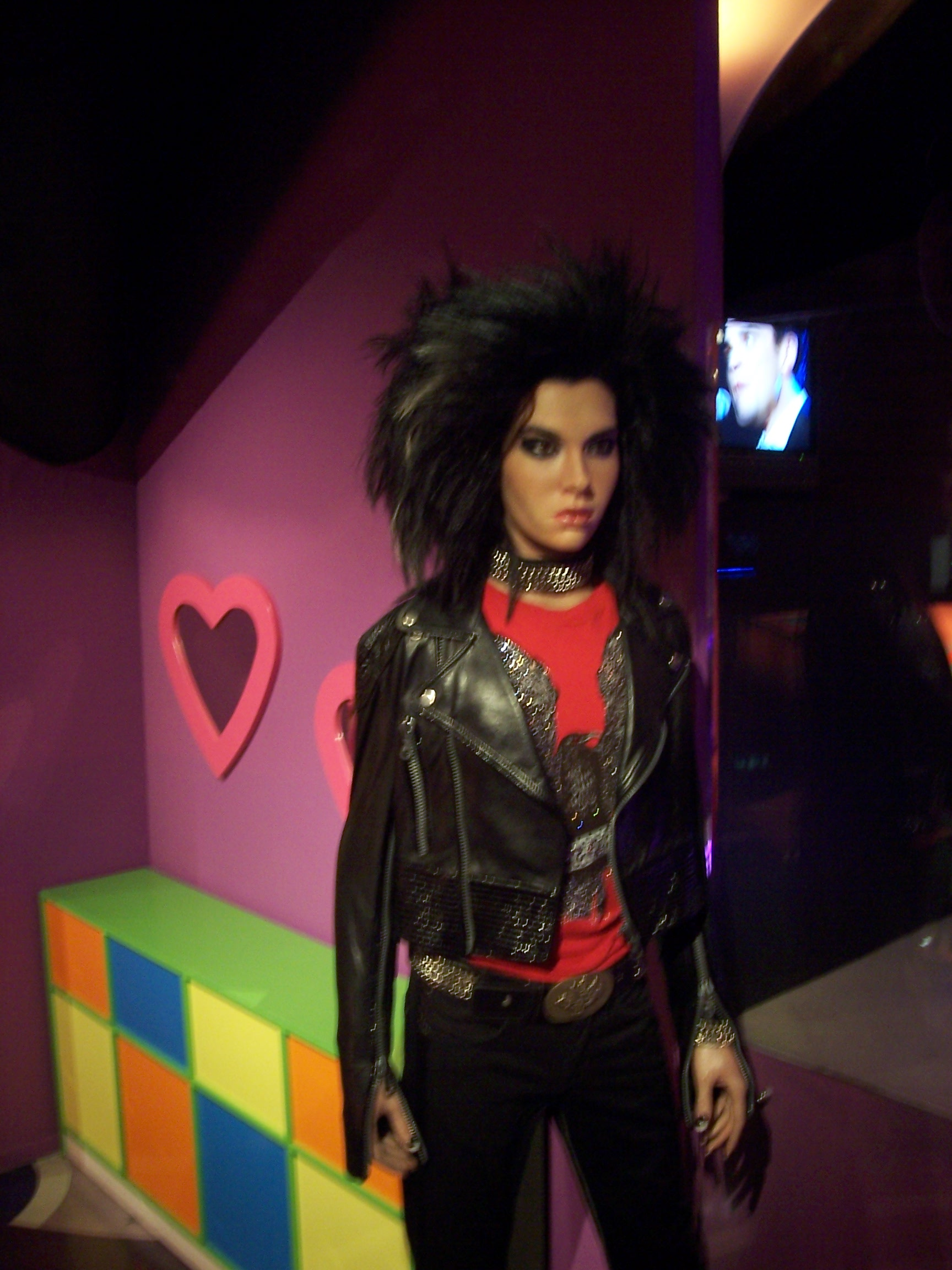
A wax statue of Kaulitz at Madame Tussauds museum in Berlin

German site dw-world.com says that Kaulitz's look, young age and edgy hairstyle has helped him obtain icon status among many teenage girls. Der Spiegel reports that Kaulitz is an icon within the LGBT community, which Kaulitz has embraced. Kaulitz designs many of his own stage costumes, and despite poor drawing skills, the designs are constructed by his tailor. The singer apparently collects suspenders, and is also "totally crazy about jackets". Kaulitz reports he has hundreds of jackets in his closet – though he has said that none of his jackets are real leather as he is opposed to using animal pelts/feathers for clothing. He cites his fashion and style influences as David Bowie (particularly in the 1986 film Labyrinth), Nena, Vampires, Paris' secondhand shops, striking jewelry and Dior Homme. He also cites Steven Tyler, Karl Lagerfeld and Hedi Slimane.

Kaulitz also has a keen interest in tattoos, getting his first one when he was 15. His skeleton hand tattoo is particularly noted among his fans. In 2018, he got a tattoo of his late dog Pumba on his right arm by German tattoo artist Daniel Meyer.

In August 2008, Kaulitz was chosen as the most attractive singer on stage by the readers of the Spanish magazine ¡Hola!. He was also immortalized in wax at the Madame Tussauds museum in Berlin on 30 September 2008. Kaulitz was 19 when the likeness was made, making him the youngest person to be duplicated by the Madame Tussauds museum in Berlin. In December 2008, Kaulitz was named "Man of the Year #6" by MTV News.

In September 2009, Kaulitz was chosen by fashion legend Karl Lagerfeld to take part in a photo shoot for the 30th birthday of Vogue in Germany. Karl Lagerfeld described him as "The Other Idea of a German" and wrote that the 20-year-old singer with the unusual styling became a superstar; and a fashion icon.

In October 2009, Kaulitz was number 11 on German magazine GQ's Best Dressed list. They cite his flamboyant style as one of the reasons he was chosen, as well as his liking to change and try new things. Designer Michael Michalsky supported his decision by saying: "Bill Kaulitz is unique and uncompromising, Pop-Art brought to life. He likes to change – that is fashion." For the Dsquared^{2} Fall/Winter 2010 fashion show, Kaulitz opened and closed the show with the song Screamin'.

After moving to the United States, Kaulitz adapted a more masculine look. Kaulitz states that his former appearance took three hours to achieve and that he couldn't top it anymore. He says that part of his new look is to "break out, live normally and love."

== Discography ==
=== Devilish ===
- Devilish (self-released, 2001)

=== Tokio Hotel ===
- Schrei (Island Records/Universal Music, 2005)
- Zimmer 483 (Island/Universal, 2007)
- Scream (Island/Universal, CherryTree Records, Interscope Records [USA], 2007)
- Humanoid (Island/Universal, Stunner Records [INTL] CherryTree Records, Interscope Records [USA], 2009)
- Kings of Suburbia (Island/Universal, Polydor Records, De-Code LTD, 2014)
- Dream Machine (Starwatch Entertainment, Believe Digital, Devilish, 2017)
- 2001 (Sony Music, Epic Records, 2022)

=== BILLY (as solo artist) ===
- I'm Not OK EP (De-Code LTD, 2016)

== Videography ==
=== Music videos ===
Tokio Hotel

- List of Tokio Hotel music videos

BILLY

- Love Don't Break Me (2016)
- Not Over You (2016)
- California High (2018)

=== Live albums ===
- Schrei – Live (Universal, 2006)
- Zimmer 483 – Live in Europe (Universal, 2007)
- Humanoid City Live (Cherry Tree, 2010)

=== Documentaries ===
- Leb' die Sekunde – Behind the Scenes (2005)
- Tokio Hotel TV – Caught on Camera (2008)
- Tokio Hotel – Hinter Die Welt (2017)

== Bibliography ==
- Career Suicide: Meine ersten dreißig Jahre (Ullstein eBooks/Hardcover, 2021)
