= Queen of Drags =

German reality television show

- Genre: Reality competition
- Judges: Heidi Klum; Bill Kaulitz; Conchita Wurst
- Opening theme: "Romantico Starlight" by Bob Sinclar
- Country of origin: Germany
- Original language: German
- No. of seasons: 1
- No. of episodes: 6

Production
- Executive producer: Alexander Koch
- Camera setup: Multi-camera
- Production company: RedSeven Entertainment

Original release
- Network: ProSieben
- Release: November 14 – December 19, 2019

Queen of Drags is a German drag competition television series, featuring 10 drag queens from Germany, Austria and Switzerland, series began airing on November 14, 2019.

Ten drag queens moved to a villa, lived together for several weeks, and were given a new task by Heidi Klum, Bill Kaulitz, and Conchita Wurst each week, from implementing the weekly motto perfectly to performing the best on stage and delighting the studio audience in Los Angeles. After every performance, the three main judges and the guest judge will each assign points. The queen with the most points earns the title of "Queen of the Week", while the queen with the least points has to leave the competition.

In a live event, the show was announced on June 27, 2019 by ProSieben, a German TV channel; that a kind of Drag Race TV format will start to premiere in winter of the same year.

== Series overview ==
Season	Premiere date	Finale date	Winner	Runner(s)-up	No. of constestants	Winner's prizes
1	November 14, 2019	December 19, 2019	Yoncé Banks	Aria Addams & Vava Vilde	10	The title of "Queen of Drags Germany"; A cover photo for Cosmopolitan Germany; A trip to Gay Pride in New York; Featured in a Mac Cosmetics Germany campaign; €100,000

== Season 1 (2019) ==
=== Contestants ===
(Ages and names stated are at time of contest)

Contestant	Name	Age	City	Finish	Place
Yoncé Banks	Savvas	26	Paderborn	Episode 6	Winner
Aria Addams	Milo	22	Wolfsburg	Episode 6	Runner-up
Vava Vilde	Michael	30	Stuttgart	Episode 6	3rd place
Catherrine Leclery	André	48	Cologne	Episode 5	4th place
Bambi Mercury	Tim	32	Berlin	Episode 5	5th place
Katy Bähm	Burak	26	Berlin	Episode 4	6th place
Candy Crash	Dennis	32	Berlin	Episode 3	7th place
Hayden Kryze	David	20	Bern	Episode 3	8th place
Samantha Gold	Bernd	35	Hamburg	Episode 2	9th place
Janisha Jones	Jan	26	München	Episode 1	10th place

=== Contestant progress ===
Contestant	1	2	3	4	5	6
Yoncé Banks	WIN	HIGH	HIGH	WIN	WIN	Winner
Aria Addams	BTM2	HIGH	BTM2	HIGH	HIGH	Runner-up
Vava Vilde	SAFE	SAFE	LOW	BTM2	WIN	Third
Catherrine Leclery	HIGH	LOW	WIN	HIGH	ELIM	Guest
Bambi Mercury	HIGH	SAFE	HIGH	HIGH	ELIM	Guest
Katy Bähm	SAFE	WIN	SAFE	ELIM		Guest
Candy Crash	LOW	SAFE	ELIM			Guest
Hayden Kryze	LOW	BTM2	ELIM			Guest
Samantha Gold	SAFE	ELIM				Guest
Janisha Jones	ELIM					Guest

The contestant won Queen of Drags.
The contestant was the runner-up.
The contestant was third.
The contestant received the highest score that week, and earned the title of Queen of the Week.
The contestant received one of the top 3 scores that week, but did not win the title of Queen of the Week.
The contestant received one of the bottom 3 scores that week.
The contestant received the second lowest score that week.
The contestant received the lowest score that week, and was eliminated.
The contestant was eliminated in a challenge before the weekly live performances.

=== Episodes ===
Ep. No. Overall	Ep. No. in Season	Episode Title	Original Date
1	1	The Art of Drag	November 14, 2019
2	2	Future Universe	November 21, 2019
3	3	Fairytale	November 28, 2019
4	4	Divas & Icons	December 5, 2019
5	5	Horror & Halloween	December 12, 2019
6	6	The Grand Finale	December 19, 2019

==== Episode 1: "The Art of Drag" ====
The ten queens move into the villa and get to know the judges. They prepare for the first live show in front of an audience, the three main judges and the guest judge Olivia Jones. The objective of that live show is to display their personal drag style.

- Guest Judge: Olivia Jones
- Show theme: Show your personal drag style.
- Queen of the Week: Yoncé Banks
- Eliminated: Janisha Jones

Performances

Queen	Song(s)	Type of Performance
Aria Addams	"This Is Me" by Keala Settle and "TOY" by Netta	Lip Sync
Yoncé Banks	"El Anillo" by Jennifer Lopez	Lip Sync
Samantha Gold	"Für mich soll's rote Rosen regnen" by Hildegard Knef	Live Singing
Hayden Kryze	"Black Madonna" by Lady Leshurr ft. Mr Eazi	Lip Sync
Janisha Jones	"Disturbia" by Rihanna	Lip Sync
Candy Crash	"Bedtime Stories" by Madonna	Lip Sync
Catherrine Leclery	"I Will Survive" by Gloria Gaynor	Lip Sync
Vava Vilde	"E.T." by Katy Perry	Lip Sync
Katy Bähm	"Instruction" by Jax Jones ft. Demi Lovato & Stefflon Don	Lip Sync
Bambi Mercury	"Who Wants To Live Forever" by Queen	Lip Sync

Scoreboard

Queen	Judges' Scores				
Queen	Heidi	Bill	Conchita	Olivia	Total
Yoncé Banks	9	10	10	10	39
Catherrine Leclery	10	9	8	8	35
Bambi Mercury	8	8	9	7	32
Katy Bähm	6	7	7	9	29
Samantha Gold	7	6	2	6	21
Vava Vilde	4	4	5	5	18
Candy Crash	1	5	4	4	14
Hayden Kryze	5	2	6	1	14
Aria Addams	2	3	3	3	11
Janisha Jones	3	1	1	2	7

==== Episode 2: "Future Universe" ====
Conchita visits the remaining 9 queens in their villa to announce this week's theme: "Future Universe". They have two hours to turn garbage into an outfit which they will present on the runway after their lip-sync performances in front of the judges and a live audience. Both of these performances are meant to fit this week's futuristic/science-fiction theme.

- Guest Judge: Amanda Lepore
- Show theme: Future Universe (and present a look created with unconventional materials)
- Runway song: "Boys" by Lizzo
- Queen of the Week: Katy Bähm
- Eliminated: Samantha Gold

Performances

Queen	Song(s)	Type of Performance
Catherrine Leclery	"The Final Countdown" by Europe	Lip Sync
Katy Bähm	"Walking On Air" by Katy Perry	Lip Sync
Hayden Kryze	"Reaction" by Jewelz & Sparks and Sick Individuals	Lip Sync
Aria Addams	"I Am Not a Robot" by Marina & The Diamonds, "UFO" by Vigiland and "Space-Taxi" by Stefan Raab feat. the Cast of Traumschiff Surprise	Lip Sync
Samantha Gold	"Move In The Right Direction" by Gossip	Lip Sync
Bambi Mercury	"Supernova" by Within Temptation	Lip Sync
Candy Crash	"We Appreciate Power" by Grimes feat. HANA	Lip Sync
Vava Vilde	"Faceshopping" by Sophie	Lip Sync
Yoncé Banks	"Titanium" by David Guetta feat. Sia	Lip Sync

Scoreboard

Queen	Judges' Scores				
Queen	Heidi	Bill	Conchita	Amanda	Total
Katy Bähm	8	8	7	9	32
Aria Addams	7	9	8	6	30
Yoncé Banks	9	4	9	8	30
Vava Vilde	6	7	4	3	20
Bambi Mercury	5	5	6	4	20
Candy Crash	3	6	5	5	19
Catherrine Leclery	2	2	3	7	14
Hayden Kryze	4	3	2	2	11
Samantha Gold	1	1	1	1	4

==== Episode 3: "Fairytale" ====
The remaining 8 queens are visited by the mailman in their villa who sends this week's theme: "Fairytale". The four lowest queens from the week prior have to act in a parody of the fairytale "Little Red Riding Hood", while the top four queens will act as judges alongside Heidi, Bill and Conchita who will eliminate the weakest link. Afterwards, the remaining 7 queens will present their lip-sync performances to this week's theme in front of the judges and a live audience.

- Guest Judge: Leona Lewis
- Show theme: Fairytale
- Play: "Rot-Dragchen und der böse Wolf" starring Catherrine Leclery (as the grandmother), Candy Crash (as the Big Bad Wolf), Hayden Kryze (as "Rot-Dragchen") and Vava Vilde (as the hunter/narrator)
- First Eliminated: Hayden Kryze
- Queen of the Week: Catherrine Leclery
- Eliminated: Candy Crash

Performances

Queen	Song(s)	Type of Performance
Candy Crash	"Bad Guy" by Billie Eilish	Lip Sync
Vava Vilde	"Flawless" and "Haunted" by Beyoncé	Lip Sync
Yoncé Banks	"What You Waiting For?" by Gwen Stefani	Lip Sync
Catherrine Leclery	"Das Farbenspiel des Winds" from Pocahontas	Lip Sync
Katy Bähm	"When You Believe" by Whitney Houston feat. Mariah Carey	Lip Sync
Aria Addams	"Fever (Balduin Remix)" by Varrick Frost feat. Lawrence Lea	Lip Sync
Bambi Mercury	"Sweet Dreams (Are Made Of This)" by Eurythmics	Lip Sync

Scoreboard

Queen	Judges' Scores				
Queen	Heidi	Bill	Conchita	Leona	Total
Catherrine Leclery	5	7	7	7	26
Yoncé Banks	7	4	6	5	22
Bambi Mercury	4	6	5	4	19
Katy Bähm	3	5	4	6	18
Vava Vilde	6	1	3	3	13
Aria Addams	1	3	2	2	8
Candy Crash	2	2	1	1	6

==== Episode 4: "Divas & Icons" ====
The remaining 6 queens are yet again visited by the mailman with this week's motto: "Divas and Icons". The queens are separated into two groups (according to their placements from the week prior) and have to choreograph a group number as well as individual solo numbers to perform after their lip-sync performances to this week's theme in front of the judges and a live audience.

- Guest Judge: Pabllo Vittar
- Show theme: Divas & Icons
- Queen of the Week: Yoncé Banks
- Eliminated: Katy Bähm

Performances

Queen	Diva/Icon	Song(s)	Type of Performance
Katy Bähm	Ariana Grande	"Focus" & "Break Free"	Lip Sync
Yoncé Banks	Beyoncé	"Crazy in Love"	Lip Sync
Bambi Mercury	Klaus Nomi	"Total Eclipse"	Lip Sync
Vava Vilde	Madonna	"American Life"	Lip Sync
Catherrine Leclery	Whitney Houston	"I'm Every Woman"	Lip Sync
Aria Addams	Lady Gaga	"The Edge of Glory"	Live Singing & Piano

Group Number: Battle of the Divas

	Group A (Bambi, Catherrine, Yoncé)	Group B (Aria, Katy, Vava)
Group Song	"Independent Women" by Destiny's Child	"Wannabe" by The Spice Girls
Solo Songs	Bambi - "Your Disco Needs You" by Kylie Minogue	Aria - "Atemlos" by Helene Fischer
Solo Songs	Yoncé - "...Baby One More Time" by Britney Spears	Vava - "Dirrty" by Christina Aguilera
Solo Songs	Catherrine - "Believe" by Cher	Katy - "Hollaback Girl" by Gwen Stefani

Scoreboard

Queen	Judges' Scores				
Queen	Heidi	Bill	Conchita	Pabllo	Total
Yoncé Banks	5	6	2	6	19
Aria Addams	6	3	3	3	15
Bambi Mercury	4	4	5	2	15
Catherrine Leclery	1	5	4	5	15
Vava Vilde	2	2	6	1	11
Katy Bähm	3	1	1	4	9

==== Episode 5: "Horror & Halloween" ====
The remaining 5 queens are visited by the mailman with this week's motto: "Horror and Halloween". In addition to their regular horror performance, the queens have to perform a dance number with a dance partner to songs chosen by the judges. Both performances take place in front of the judges and a live audience.

- Guest Judge: La Toya Jackson
- Show theme: Horror & Halloween
- Queen of the Week: Vava Vilde and Yoncé Banks
- Eliminated: Bambi Mercury (5th) and Catherrine Leclery (4th)

Performances

Queen	Songs for Horror Performances	Type of Performance	Songs for Dance Performances
Bambi Mercury	"Call Me Maybe" by Carly Rae Jepsen	Lip Sync	"Toxic" by Britney Spears
Yoncé Banks	"I Fink U Freeky" by Die Antwoord	Lip Sync	"Sweet Dreams" by Marilyn Manson
Vava Vilde	"Engel" by Rammstein	Lip Sync	"Murder on the Dancefloor" by Sophie Ellis-Bextor
Aria Addams	"The Spook Returns (Mix)" by KSHMR	Lip Sync	"Sweet But Psycho" by Ava Max
Catherrine Leclery	"And I Am Telling You I'm Not Going" by Jennifer Holliday	Lip Sync	"The Time Warp" from Rocky Horror Picture Show

Scoreboard

Queen	Judges' Scores				
Queen	Heidi	Bill	Conchita	La Toya	Total
Vava Vilde	5	3	4	3	15
Yoncé Banks	4	5	2	4	15
Aria Addams	1	2	5	5	13
Catherrine Leclery	3	4	3	2	12
Bambi Mercury	2	1	1	1	5

==== Episode 6: "The Grand Finale" ====
The final 3 queens are visited by their fellow queens with the final motto: "Candyland". In addition to their regular performance, the finalists need to perform with the already eliminated queens in small groups and as one large group to songs chosen by the judges. Their three performances take place in front of the judges and a live audience.

- Guest Judge: Laganja Estranja
- Show theme: Candyland
- Top Three: Aria Addams, Vava Vilde and Yoncé Banks
- Winner of Queen of Drags - Season 1: Yoncé Banks
- Runner-Ups: Vava Vilde (3rd) and Aria Addams (2nd)

Group Numbers

Queen	Songs for Group Numbers	Returning Queens	Type of Performance
Aria Addams	"Milkshake" by Kelis	Bambi Mercury, Samantha Gold	Lip Sync
Vava Vilde	"California Gurls" by Katy Perry ft. Snoop Dogg	Hayden Kryze, Janisha Jones	Lip Sync
Yoncé Banks	"Lady Marmalade" by Christina Aguilera, Lil' Kim, Mya, Pink	Candy Crash, Catherrine Leclery, Katy Bähm	Lip Sync
Final Group Number	"Run the World (Girls)" by Beyoncé	Everyone	Lip Sync

Performances

Queen	Song(s)	Type of Performance
Vava Vilde	"Underneath" by Adam Lambert	Lip Sync
Yoncé Banks	"Standing on the Sun" by Beyoncé ft. Mr. Vegas	Lip Sync
Aria Addams	"Candyman" by Christina Aguilera	Lip Sync

Scoreboard

Queen	Judges' Scores				
Queen	Heidi	Bill	Conchita	Laganja	Total
Yoncé Banks	3	3	3	2	11
Aria Addams	2	1	2	3	8
Vava Vilde	1	2	1	1	5
