= An deiner Seite (Ich bin da) =

"An deiner Seite (Ich bin da)" "1000 Meere"/ "1000 Oceans"

Single by Tokio Hotel

from the album Zimmer 483
- B-side: "1000 Meere"/ "1000 Oceans"/ "Geh!"
- Released: 16 November 2007 (Europe); July 2008 (1000 Meere/1000 Oceans)
- Genre: Alternative rock, pop rock
- Length: 4:24 (Album Version); 3:53 (Radio Edit)
- Label: Island, Universal Music
- Songwriters: Patrick Benzner, Peter Hoffmann, David Jost, Bill Kaulitz, Dave Roth

Tokio Hotel singles chronology
| "Ready, Set, Go!" (2007) | "An deiner Seite (Ich bin da)" / "1000 Meere / 1000 Oceans" (2007) | "Scream" (2007) |

"An deiner Seite (Ich bin da)" (English: By Your Side (I'm here)) is the third single from the album Zimmer 483 from band Tokio Hotel. The song's translated version By Your Side was released simultaneously in non-German-speaking countries with exactly the same video. "By Your Side" is included in the band's album Scream.

The single also contains a B-side, called "1000 Meere" (English: 1000 Oceans), which was also accompanied by a music video. It also contains a new, unreleased song "Geh!" (English: Leave!) which the band promised to the German fans.

== Music videos ==
"An deiner Seite (Ich bin da)"

The video for "An deiner Seite (Ich bin da)" consists of a montage of scenes from the Zimmer 483 - Live In Europe DVD and includes video footage of Tokio Hotel performing the song. The video begins and ends with the sound of screaming fans and also includes lead singer Bill Kaulitz yelling "danke schön" (Thanks a lot) to the audience. The song's translated version "By Your Side" was released with exactly the same video.

"1000 Meere"/ "1000 Oceans"

The video for "1000 Meere" has more of a storyline. The video shows the four band-members in different parts of an abandoned train station, walking over the tracks and staring into the distance. Eventually, the four boys meet up and ascend one of the trains, which starts moving while the band performs inside one of the carriages. Near the end of the video, the train starts speeding across the ocean, while the band members climb onto the roof of the train.

== Formats and track listings ==
These are the formats and track listings of major single releases of "An deiner Seite (Ich bin da)".

- CD maxi single
1. "An deiner Seite (Ich bin da)" (Radio edit) - 3:53
2. "1000 Meere" (Single version) - 4:04
3. "Geh" - 4:22
4. "An Deiner Seite (Ich Bin Da)" (live video) - 4:27
5. "An Deiner Seite (Ich Bin Da)" (Music video) - 4:46
- CD single, pt. 2
1. "An deiner Seite (Ich bin da)" (Radio edit) - 3:53
2. "483 Live in Europe Tour Film" (video) - 7:07
- DVD single
1. "An deiner Seite (Ich bin da)" (Music video) - 4:46
2. "1000 Meere" (Music video) - 4:20

== Charts ==
| Chart (2007–2008) | Peak position |
|---|---|
| Austria Singles Chart | 6 |
| Finland Singles Chart | 13 |
| France Singles Chart | 2 |
| Germany Singles Chart | 2 |
| Russian Singles Chart | 160 |
