= Zimmer 483 – Live in Europe =

Live album by Tokio Hotel
- Released: 30 November 2007
- Recorded: 2 May 2007
- Venues: König Pilsener Arena, Oberhausen, Germany
- Genres: Pop rock Alternative rock
- Length: 1:32:51
- Language: German
- Labels: Island, Universal Music

Tokio Hotel chronology
Zimmer 483 (2007)	Zimmer 483 – Live in Europe (2007)	Scream (2007)

Tokio Hotel video chronology
Schrei - Live (2006)	Zimmer 483 – Live in Europe (2007)	Tokio Hotel TV – Caught On Camera (2008)

Zimmer 483 – Live in Europe is a live album and DVD released by the German band Tokio Hotel on 30 November 2007. It was recorded on 2 May 2007 at the Köpi Arena in Oberhausen, Germany during the first leg of their Zimmer 483 Tour.

== Track listing ==
#	Title	Length
1.	"Übers Ende der Welt (Live)"	4:14
2.	"Reden (Live)"	2:58
3.	"Ich brech aus (Live)"	4:27
4.	"Spring nicht (Live)"	5:26
5.	"Der letzte Tag (Live)"	4:43
6.	"Wo sind eure Hände (Live)"	3:54
7.	"Durch den Monsun (Live)"	6:51
8.	"Wir sterben niemals aus (Live)"	3:01
9.	"Stich ins Glück (Live)"	5:06
10.	"Ich bin nicht ich (Live)"	4:17
11.	"Schrei (Live)"	5:11
12.	"Vergessene Kinder (Live)"	8:05
13.	"Leb Die Sekunde (Live)"	6:09
14.	"Heilig (Live)"	5:00
15.	"Totgeliebt (Live)"	5:58
16.	"In die Nacht (Live)"	5:00
17.	"Rette mich (Live)"	5:17
18.	"An deiner seite (Ich bin da) (Live)"	7:14

== Chart positions ==
=== Weekly charts ===
Chart performance for Zimmer 483 – Live in Europe
Chart (2007–2008)	Peak position
Austrian Albums (Ö3 Austria)	67
Austrian Music DVD (Ö3 Austria)	3
Belgian Albums (Ultratop Flanders)	40
Belgian Albums (Ultratop Wallonia)	33
Belgian Music DVD (Ultratop Flanders)	1
Belgian Music DVD (Ultratop Wallonia)	2
Danish Music DVD (Hitlisten)	1
Dutch Music DVD (MegaCharts)	5
Finnish Music DVD (Suomen virallinen lista)	2
French Albums (SNEP)	61
Greek Music DVD (IFPI)	1
Italian Music DVD (FIMI)	1
Norwegian Music DVD (VG-lista)	3
Portuguese Music DVD (AFP)	1
Spanish Albums (Promusicae)	34
Spanish Music DVD (Promusicae)	2
Swedish Music DVD (Sverigetopplistan)	3
Swiss Albums (Schweizer Hitparade)	34
Swiss Music DVD (Schweizer Hitparade)	3

=== Year-end charts ===
Year-end chart performance for Zimmer 483 – Live in Europe
Chart (2008)	Position
Belgian Albums (Ultratop Wallonia)	87

== Certifications ==
=== Video ===
Certifications and sales for Zimmer 483 – Live in Europe
Region	Certification	Certified units/sales
France (SNEP)	Diamond	100,000^{*}
Italy	—	30,000
Portugal (AFP)	Platinum	8,000^{^}
Russia (NFPF)	Gold	10,000^{*}
^{*} Sales figures based on certification alone.^{^} Shipments figures based on certification alone.
