= Schrei – Live =

Video by Tokio Hotel
- Released: April 7, 2006
- Recorded: March 11, 2006
- Venues: König Pilsener Arena, Oberhausen, Germany
- Genres: Pop punk, pop rock
- Length: 85:02
- Language: German
- Labels: Island, Universal Music

Tokio Hotel video chronology
Leb' die Sekunde – Behind the Scenes (2005)	Schrei – Live (2006)	Zimmer 483 – Live in Europe (2007)

Schrei – Live is a live DVD released by the German band Tokio Hotel on April 7, 2006. It was recorded on March 11, 2006 at the König Pilsener Arena in Oberhausen, Germany during the 2006 leg of their Schrei Tour.

== Track listing ==
#	Title
1.	"Jung und nicht mehr jugendfrei"
2.	"Beichte"
3.	"Ich bin nich' ich"
4.	"Schrei"
5.	"Leb' die Sekunde"
6.	"Schwarz"
7.	"Lass uns hier raus"
8.	"Gegen meinen Willen"
9.	"Durch den Monsun"
10.	"Thema Nr. 1"
11.	"Wenn nichts mehr geht"
12.	"Rette mich"
13.	"Freunde bleiben"
14.	"Der letzte Tag"
15.	"Frei im freien Fall"
16.	"Unendlichkeit"
17.	"Durch den Monsun" (Encore)

== Bonus Content ==
1. One Night in Tokio
2. Bildergallerie

== Chart positions ==
=== Weekly charts ===
Chart performance for Schrei – Live
Chart (2006–2008)	Peak position
Austrian Music DVD (Ö3 Austria)	1
Greek Music DVD (IFPI)	4
Italian Music DVD (FIMI)	3
Swedish Music DVD (Sverigetopplistan)	3

== Certifications ==
Certifications and sales for Schrei – Live
Region	Certification	Certified units/sales
Austria (IFPI Austria)	Gold	5,000^{*}
France (SNEP)	3× Platinum	60,000^{*}
^{*} Sales figures based on certification alone.
