= Dream Machine (album) =

Studio album by Tokio Hotel
- Released: 3 March 2017
- Recorded: 2015–16
- Genre: Synthwave; pop rock; electronic rock
- Length: 40:46
- Language: English
- Label: Starwatch; Believe Digital; Devilish
- Producer: Tom Kaulitz

Tokio Hotel chronology
Kings of Suburbia (2014)	Dream Machine (2017)	2001 (2022)

Singles from Dream Machine
- 1. "Something New" Released: 23 December 2016; 2. "What If" Released: 29 December 2016; 3. "Boy Don't Cry" Released: 20 October 2017; 4. "Easy" Released: 22 December 2017

Dream Machine is the sixth studio album by German band Tokio Hotel. It was released by Starwatch Music on March 3, 2017, worldwide. The album is available at retail and online stores with two versions available: a standard edition CD/vinyl (10 tracks) and a limited deluxe box edition (includes album CD, a CD of instrumental version of the album, a vinyl of single "What If" with a bonus track and Bill's personal notebook of handwritten notes, photos and other notes).

== Background ==
The band first announced that they were beginning work on a new album back in 2015 while filming for one of the episodes of their web series "Tokio Hotel TV". Since then, Bill posted some lyrics and sneak peeks on his Instagram account. The album was made for pre-order on December 23, 2016, on iTunes and Amazon with first promo single "Something New" made available for instant download. The lead single "What If" was released on December 29, 2016.

== Reception ==
Critical response to album was mixed. MusikExpress gave the album 2 out of 5 stars rating, calling it a "boom-boom-autotune". Overall, the album was mostly praised for lyrical improvements but criticized for the use of Auto-Tune.

== Track listing ==
All lyrics are written by Bill Kaulitz and Tom Kaulitz, except where noted; all music is composed by B. Kaulitz, T. Kaulitz and Devon Culiner, except where noted.

No.	Title	Length
1.	"Something New"	5:21
2.	"Boy Don't Cry" (music: B. Kaulitz and T. Kaulitz)	3:32
3.	"Easy"	4:25
4.	"What If"	3:32
5.	"Elysa" (lyrics: B. Kaulitz, T. Kaulitz and Nisse)	4:28
6.	"Dream Machine"	4:35
7.	"Cotton Candy Sky" (music: B. Kaulitz and T. Kaulitz)	3:31
8.	"Better"	3:43
9.	"As Young as We Are" (lyrics: B. Kaulitz, T. Kaulitz and Shiro Gutzie; music: B. Kaulitz, T. Kaulitz, Culiner and Gutzie)	3:48
10.	"Stop, Babe" (music: B. Kaulitz and T. Kaulitz)	3:51
Total length:		40:46

== Personnel ==
Credits adapted from the album's booklet.

Tokio Hotel

- Bill Kaulitz - lead vocals
- Tom Kaulitz - guitars (tracks 1–4, 6–10), additional bass (tracks 7, 10), piano (tracks 3, 5–6, 8–10), keyboards, percussion (tracks 1–4, 6–10), programming
- Georg Listing - bass (tracks 1–4, 6–10)
- Gustav Schäfer - drums (tracks 1, 3–4, 6–10), percussion (track 2)

Additional personnel

- Devon Culiner - keyboards (tracks 1, 3–5, 8–9), percussion (tracks 3–4, 8–9), programming (tracks 1, 3–6, 8–9)

== Charts ==
Chart (2017)	Peak position
Austrian Albums (Ö3 Austria)	10
Belgian Albums (Ultratop Flanders)	153
Belgian Albums (Ultratop Wallonia)	63
Dutch Albums (Album Top 100)	52
Finnish Albums (Suomen virallinen lista)	30
French Albums (SNEP)	56
German Albums (Offizielle Top 100)	5
Italian Albums (FIMI)	30
Polish Albums (ZPAV)	42
Portuguese Albums (AFP)	28
Spanish Albums (PROMUSICAE)	53
Swiss Albums (Schweizer Hitparade)	15
