= Spring nicht =

2007 single by Tokio Hotel

Single by Tokio Hotel

from the album Zimmer 483
- Language: German
- English title: "Don't Jump"
- B-side: "In die Nacht"
- Released: 6 April 2007
- Genre: Alternative rock, pop rock, soft rock, power ballad
- Length: 4:09
- Label: Island, Universal Music
- Songwriters: Bill Kaulitz, Tom Kaulitz, Dave Roth, David Jost, Peter Hoffmann, Patrick Benzner
- Producers: Dave Roth, David Jost, Peter Hoffmann, Patrick Benzner

Tokio Hotel singles chronology
| "Übers Ende der Welt" (2007) | "Spring nicht" (2007) | "Monsoon" (2007) |

"Don't Jump"

Single by Tokio Hotel

from the album Scream
- B-side: "Geh"
- Released: 4 April 2008
- Genre: Alternative rock, pop rock, soft rock, power ballad
- Length: 4:09
- Label: Universal
- Songwriters: Bill Kaulitz, Tom Kaulitz, Dave Roth, David Jost, Peter Hoffmann, Patrick Benzner
- Producers: Dave Roth, David Jost, Peter Hoffmann, Patrick Benzner

Tokio Hotel singles chronology
| "Scream" (2007) | "Don't Jump" (2008) | "Heilig" (2008) |

"Spring nicht'" and "Don't Jump" are songs by German pop rock band Tokio Hotel. The German version of the song, "Spring nicht", was released as the second single from their second album, Zimmer 483. The song was later translated and re-recorded as "Don't Jump" for the band's first English-language album, Scream. In 2008, a music video for "Don't Jump" was released on 8 February, and it was issued as an official single on 4 April.

== Music and lyrics ==
Tokio Hotel wrote "Spring nicht" (meaning "Don't jump") to encourage teenagers to seek other solutions to their problems apart from suicide. Despite the uproar the video caused, lead singer Bill Kaulitz, who co-wrote the song, says that he has never had any thoughts of suicide.

== Music videos ==
The music video for the German version, "Spring nicht", which takes place at night, starts with lead singer Bill Kaulitz, in a long black leather coat, walking through a city past men robbing a store and another man stealing from a homeless person. At the same time, another version of Bill (dressed in plain clothes and lacking his usual make-up) is standing on top of a multi-story car park, teary-eyed and apparently ready to jump. While several people notice the suicidal figure on top of the building, no one does anything, except Bill's other self, who rushes into the parking structure and runs up the flights of stairs. On the roof, the two versions look at each other and a third version of Bill (identical to the suicidal version) is created. This third version walks away from the roof safely, while the suicidal version falls off the building and the version in the long coat simply disappears, making it unclear whether anyone has really committed suicide. Shots of the entire band performing inside the multi-story car park are shown throughout the video.

The music video for the English version, "Don't Jump", is identical to the video for the German-language original "Spring nicht," however, because of the uproar surrounding the German-language video, the English-language version does not feature shots of the suicidal version of Bill falling off the building. The uproar surrounding the suicide scene had even prompted a German TV news show to do a report on suicides in music videos. This is the only Tokio Hotel video in which Bill can be seen without his usual makeup (apart from several archive images shown in the video for "An deiner Seite" and "Lass Uns Laufen/World Behind My Wall.)

== Track listings ==
- CD single: Spring nicht
1. "Spring nicht" (single version) - 4:08
2. "Reden" (Unplugged video)
- CD maxi single: Spring nicht
1. "Spring nicht" (single version) - 4:08
2. "Spring nicht" (Robots to Mars remix) - 3:25
3. "In die Nacht" - 3:19
4. "483 Tourproben Outtakes" - 2:00
5. "Tokio Hotel Mediaplayer
6. "Bildergalerie"
- DVD single: Spring nicht
1. "Spring nicht" (music video) - 4:08
2. "Spring nicht" (making of the video) - 8:03
3. "Stick ins Glück" (Unplugged "Tourproben" video) - 4:07
4. "Wir sterben neimals aus" (Unplugged "Tourproben" Video) - 2:56
1. "Studioführung Bill & Tom" (video) - 5:03
- CD single: Don't Jump
1. "Don't Jump" - 4:09
2. "Geh" - 4:22

== Charts ==
=== "Spring nicht" ===
==== Weekly charts ====
| Chart (2007) | Peak position |
|---|---|
| Austria (Ö3 Austria Top 40) | 7 |
| Denmark (Tracklisten) | 10 |
| Europe (Eurochart Hot 100) | 14 |
| France (SNEP) | 9 |
| Germany (GfK) | 3 |
| Switzerland (Schweizer Hitparade) | 21 |
| Ukraine (TopHit) | 150 |

==== Year-end charts ====
| Chart (2007) | Position |
|---|---|
| France (SNEP) | 77 |
| Germany (Media Control GfK) | 89 |

=== "Don't Jump" ===
| Chart (2008) | Peak position |
|---|---|
| Belgium (Ultratop 50 Flanders) | 39 |
| Netherlands (Dutch Top 40) | 22 |
| Netherlands (Single Top 100) | 9 |
| Russia (TopHit) | 378 |
| Ukraine (TopHit) | 359 |
