= Schrei (song) =

2005 single by Tokio Hotel

Single by Tokio Hotel

from the album Schrei
- B-side: "Schwarz", "Beichte"
- Released: November 25, 2005 (Germany)
- Genre: Alternative rock, Hard Rock
- Length: 3:17
- Label: Island, Universal Music
- Songwriters: Dave Roth, David Jost
- Producers: Dave Roth, David Jost, Peter Hoffmann, Patrick Benzner

Tokio Hotel singles chronology
"Durch den Monsun" (2005)	"Schrei" (2005)	"Rette Mich" (2006)

"Schrei" and "Scream" are rock songs by German pop rock band Tokio Hotel. The German version of the song, "Schrei", was released as the second single from the band's debut album Schrei and is also the album's opening track. An English version of the song called "Scream" was later included in their first English album Scream and released as their fourth English single in 2007.

== Music video ==
The music video for "Schrei" takes place in a house packed with people, apparently having a party. The band, set up in the living room, begins playing as lead singer Bill Kaulitz makes his way through the crowd. As the band is playing we see scenes of the party including footage of a girl throwing up in the toilet, people destroying the bathroom, girls kissing, and a couple making out while another girl runs her hand through the guy's hair. Near the end of the song Bill crowdsurfs and gets pulled onto the second floor, where he finishes the song. The end of the video shows the band destroying all their equipment.

The music video for "Scream" is an exact replica of the video for the German-language original "Schrei" with the only exception of the band members being older and Bill watching the girls kiss. "Scream" was the background song in the Spike TV Scream Awards 2008.

== "Scream" ==
There are two versions of the English version, "Scream": one that is used in the music video and one used on their MySpace. The differences between the songs are minor but noticeable. The main difference can be heard in the way the word "scream" is sung. The second version also sounds more edited and worked on.

"Scream" was released as a single in America on December 11, 2007 under the name "Scream America!". It is a two track limited edition single with "Ready, Set, Go!", an English version of their song Übers Ende der Welt, as the b-side.

"Scream"

Single by Tokio Hotel

from the album Scream
- B-side: "Ready, Set, Go!"
- Released: December 11, 2007 (U.S.)
- Genre: Alternative Rock, Hard Rock
- Label: Island (Universal)
- Songwriters: Dave Roth, David Jost, Rebecca Roth
- Producers: Dave Roth, David Jost, Peter Hoffmann, Patrick Benzner

Tokio Hotel singles chronology
"An Deiner Seite (Ich Bin Da)" (2007)	"Scream" (2007)	"Don't Jump" (2008)

== Formats and track listings ==
These are the formats and track listings of major single releases of "Schrei" and "Scream".

- CD single
1. "Schrei" (single mix) - 3:17
2. "Schrei" (Grizzly mix) - 3:19
- CD Maxi single
1. "Schrei" (single mix) - 3:17
2. "Schrei" (Grizzly mix) - 3:19
3. "Schwarz" - 3:21
4. "Beichte" - 3:36
5. "Schrei" (music video) - 3:17
- "Scream America! Limited Edition" CD single
1. "Scream" - 3:17
2. "Ready, Set, Go! (AFI/Blaqk Audio Remix)" - 3:07
3. 1000 Oceans - 4:04

== Charts ==
Chart (2005) ^{1}	Peak position
Austrian Singles Chart	3
Dutch Singles Chart	42
German Singles Chart	5
Swiss Singles Chart	18
Chart (2007)/(2009)^{2}	Peak position position
Italian Singles Chart	20
Venezuela Pop Rock (Record Report)	16

Notes

- ^{1}: Chart positions of 2005 are of the German version, "Schrei"
- ^{2}: Chart positions of 2007 are of the English version, "Scream"
