= Der letzte Tag =

2006 single by Tokio Hotel

Single by Tokio Hotel

from the album Schrei
- Language: German
- English title: "The Last Day"
- B-side: "Frei im freien Fall", "Wir schliessen uns ein"
- Released: 25 August 2006
- Length: 3:14
- Label: Island, Universal Music
- Songwriters: Bill Kaulitz, Dave Roth, Pat Benzner, David Jost
- Producers: Peter Hoffmann, David Jost, Dave Roth, Patrick Benzner

Tokio Hotel singles chronology
"Rette Mich" (2005)	"Der letzte Tag" (2006)	"Übers Ende der Welt" (2007)

"Der letzte Tag" (English: "The Last Day") is the fourth single released from German alternative rock band Tokio Hotel's debut studio album, Schrei (2005). The single version involved a re-recording because singer Bill Kaulitz's voice broke after the release of the album. The re-recording, along with a new song called "Wir schliessen uns ein" and a B-side, "Frei im freien fall", appear on part one of this single and on some copies of the re-released and expanded Schrei album Schrei - so laut du kannst. The song was later translated into English for their Scream album, re-titled "Final Day". It was not released as an English single.

== Music video ==
The music video for the song "Der letzte Tag" consists of a video of the band performing live on a rooftop in Berlin. When the video starts, fans run down the street toward the building as the band begins to assemble. Bill begins singing while sitting on the building's edge, his legs dangling. During the video, Georg, Tom and Bill constantly run back and forth on the roof while playing, with the result that their positions change constantly. By the time the band plays the final chorus of the song, Georg, Tom and Bill are bouncing up and down while playing and singing. The fans do likewise. (The music video for "Wir schliessen uns ein" begins on the same roof as the band descends from the building.)

== Track listings ==
German CD1

1. "Der letzte Tag" (single version) – 3:14
2. "Der letzte Tag" (Grizzly remix) – 3:14
3. "Frei im freien Fall" – 3:03
4. "Wir schliessen uns ein" – 3:14
5. "Wir schliessen uns ein" (video) – 3:12

German CD2

1. "Der letzte Tag" (single version) – 3:14
2. "Der letzte Tag" (acoustic version) – 3:18
3. "Der letzte Tag" (video) – 4:50
4. Tokio Hotel gallery
5. "Der letzte Tag" (Fanspecial backstage live clip) – 3:20

== Charts ==
=== Weekly charts ===
Chart (2006)	Peak position
Austria (Ö3 Austria Top 40)	1
Europe (Eurochart Hot 100)	8
Germany (GfK)	1
Switzerland (Schweizer Hitparade)	7

=== Year-end charts ===
Chart (2006)	Position
Austria (Ö3 Austria Top 40)	25
Germany (Media Control GfK)	32

== Certifications ==
Region	Certification	Certified units/sales
Austria (IFPI Austria)	Gold	15,000^{*}
^{*} Sales figures based on certification alone.
