= Zimmer 483 =

Studio album by Tokio Hotel
- Released: 23 February 2007
- Recorded: 2006
- Genre: Pop rock; alternative rock; pop-punk
- Length: 44:44
- Label: Island, Universal Music
- Producer: Patrick Benzner, Dave Roth, Peter Hoffmann, David Jost

Tokio Hotel chronology
Schrei (2005)	Zimmer 483 (2007)	Scream (2007)

Singles from Zimmer 483
- 1. "Übers Ende der Welt" Released: 26 January 2007; 2. "Spring nicht" Released: 4 June 2007; 3. "An deiner Seite (Ich bin da)" Released: 16 November 2007; 4. "Heilig" Released: 28 April 2008 (only France)

Zimmer 483 ("Room 483") is the second studio album by the German pop rock band Tokio Hotel. It was released in Germany on 23 February 2007. The album yielded four singles including "Übers Ende der Welt", "Spring nicht" and "An deiner Seite (Ich bin da)". In contrast to other Tokio Hotel releases Zimmer 483 has proven to be the most reliable when it comes to sales, with over 375,000 copies sold in just two months. It has been certified platinum in Austria. The album was initially released in a Digipak case with a bonus DVD including the promotional video for "Übers Ende der Welt", special Making-Of the video feature, Interview, and Photo gallery.

== Track listing ==
Credits adapted from the liner notes of Zimmer 483.

All tracks are produced by Patrick Benzner, Dave Roth, Peter Hoffmann and David Jost, except where noted.

Zimmer 483 – Standard edition
No.	Title	Writer(s)	Length
1.	"Übers Ende der Welt"	Dave Roth; Patrick Benzner; David Jost; Peter Hoffmann; Bill Kaulitz; Tom Kaulitz	3:33
2.	"Totgeliebt"	D. Roth; Benzner; Jost; Hoffmann; B. Kaulitz; T. Kaulitz; Georg Listing; Gustav Schafer	3:42
3.	"Spring nicht"	D. Roth; Benzner; Jost; Hoffmann; B. Kaulitz; T. Kaulitz	4:09
4.	"Heilig"	D. Roth; Benzner; Jost; Hoffmann; B. Kaulitz	4:03
5.	"Wo sind eure Hände"	D. Roth; Benzner; Jost; Hoffmann; B. Kaulitz; T. Kaulitz; Listing; Schafer	3:37
6.	"Stich ins Glück"	D. Roth; Benzner; Jost; Hoffmann; B. Kaulitz; T. Kaulitz	4:05
7.	"Ich brech aus"	D. Roth; Benzner; Jost; Hoffmann; B. Kaulitz; T. Kaulitz; Listing; Schafer	3:24
8.	"Reden"	D. Roth; Benzner; Jost; Hoffmann; B. Kaulitz; T. Kaulitz	3:13
9.	"Nach dir kommt nichts"	D. Roth; Benzner; Jost; Hoffmann; B. Kaulitz; T. Kaulitz	3:14
10.	"Wir sterben niemals aus"	B. Kaulitz; T. Kaulitz	2:59
11.	"Vergessene Kinder"	D. Roth; Benzner; Jost; Hoffmann; B. Kaulitz; T. Kaulitz	4:34
12.	"An deiner Seite (Ich bin da)"	D. Roth; Benzner; Jost; Hoffmann; B. Kaulitz	4:24
13.	"In die Nacht" (Hidden Track*)	B. Kaulitz	3:21
Total length:			44:44

Zimmer 483 – France/Spain bonus tracks
No.	Title	Writer(s)	Producer(s)	Length
14.	"Wir schliessen uns ein"	D. Roth; Benzner; Jost; Hoffmann; B. Kaulitz; T. Kaulitz		3:14
15.	"Monsoon"	B. Kaulitz	D. Roth; Benzner; Jost; Hoffmann; Rebecca Roth	4:02
16.	"Ready, Set, Go!"	T. Kaulitz; B. Kaulitz	D. Roth; Benzner; Jost; Hoffmann; R. Roth	3:34

- The Romanian version of Zimmer 483 features the track listed visible on its tracklist. However, on this version "In Die Nacht" is listed as the first track and the other tracks are listed and playing in the normal order as the general version, starting with the second track.

Deluxe Edition – Bonus DVD

1. Photo Gallery "Zimmer 483"
2. Interview
3. "Übers Ende der Welt" (Making of)
4. "Übers Ende der Welt" (Music Video)

== Release history ==
Country	Date
Europe	23 February 2007
Canada	25 March 2008
Mexico	23 September 2008

== Charts ==
=== Weekly charts ===
Weekly chart performance for Zimmer 483
Chart (2007)	Peak position
Austrian Albums (Ö3 Austria)	2
Belgian Albums (Ultratop Flanders)	50
Belgian Albums (Ultratop Wallonia)	13
Czech Albums (ČNS IFPI)	6
Danish Albums (Hitlisten)	11
Finnish Albums (Suomen virallinen lista)	13
French Albums (SNEP)	2
Dutch Albums (Album Top 100)	23
French Albums (SNEP)	12
German Albums (Offizielle Top 100)	1
Hungarian Albums (MAHASZ)	5
Italian Albums (FIMI)	26
Spanish Albums (Promusicae)	97
Swiss Albums (Schweizer Hitparade)	2

=== Year-end charts ===
Year-end chart performance for Zimmer 483
Chart (2007)	Position
Austrian Albums (Ö3 Austria)	59
Belgian Albums (Ultratop Wallonia)	30
French Albums (SNEP)	15
German Albums (Offizielle Top 100)	18
Hungarian Albums (MAHASZ)	51
Swiss Albums (Schweizer Hitparade)	69

== Certifications ==
Region	Certification	Certified units/sales
Austria (IFPI Austria)	Platinum	20,000^{*}
Belgium (BRMA)	Gold	25,000^{*}
France (SNEP)	Gold	75,000^{*}
Germany (BVMI)	Platinum	200,000^{‡}
Hungary (MAHASZ)	Gold	3,000^{^}
Poland (ZPAV)	Gold	10,000^{*}
Russia (NFPF)	3× Platinum	60,000^{*}
Switzerland (IFPI Switzerland)	Gold	15,000^{^}
^{*} Sales figures based on certification alone.^{^} Shipments figures based on certification alone.^{‡} Sales+streaming figures based on certification alone.

== Personnel ==
Performance credits

- Bill Kaulitz – lead vocals
- Tom Kaulitz – guitars, backing vocals
- Georg Listing – bass guitar, backing vocals
- Gustav Schäfer – drums, percussion

Technical credits

- Patrick Benzner – production, mixing
- Dave Roth – production, mixing
- David Jost – production
- Peter Hoffmann – production
- Manfred Faust – mixing
- Gateway – mastering
- Jens Boldt – photography
