= Scream (Tokio Hotel album) =

Studio album by Tokio Hotel
- Released: 1 June 2007
- Recorded: 2006–2007
- Genres: Pop rock; alternative rock
- Length: 46:13
- Language: English
- Labels: Cherrytree; Island; Interscope
- Producers: Patrick Benzner; Dave Roth; Peter Hoffmann; David Jost

Tokio Hotel chronology
Zimmer 483 (2007)	Scream (2007)	Humanoid (2009)

Singles from Scream
- 1. "Monsoon" Released: 18 May 2007; 2. "Ready, Set, Go!" Released: 24 August 2007; 3. "Scream" Released: 11 December 2007 (US only); 4. "Don't Jump" Released: 8 February 2008; 5. "1000 Oceans" Released: July 2008

Scream is the debut English studio album and the third overall studio album by German band Tokio Hotel. It contains English versions of songs from their previous albums Schrei and Zimmer 483: eight of the twelve songs come from Zimmer 483 while the remaining four originated from Schrei. The name Scream is the English translation of the name of the first Tokio Hotel album, Schrei.

In German-speaking countries, the album was released as Room 483 – the English translation of their second album's name ("Zimmer 483"). The first single released from the album was simply called "Monsoon" – not "Through the Monsoon" (the literal translation of the original, "Durch den Monsun").

== Reception ==
Professional ratings
Review scores
Source	Rating
Allmusic	3/5 stars
Billboard	4/5 stars
Rolling Stone	3.5/5 stars
Cosmos Gaming	(mixed)

Initial critical response to Scream was mixed. At Metacritic, which assigns a normalized rating out of 100 to reviews from mainstream critics, the album has received a score of 51, based on four reviews. In the US, Tokio Hotel won the MTV VMA Best New Artist award for the album.

== Track listing ==
Credits adapted from the liner notes of Scream.

Scream – Standard edition
No.	Title	Writer(s)	Producer(s)	Length
1.	"Scream"	Dave Roth; David Jost; Rebecca Roth	Patrick Benzner; D. Roth; Peter Hoffmann; Jost	3:21
2.	"Ready, Set, Go!"	D. Roth; Benzner; Jost; Hoffmann; Tom Kaulitz; Bill Kaulitz; R. Roth	Benzner; D. Roth; Hoffmann; Jost	3:34
3.	"Monsoon"	D. Roth; Benzner; Jost; Hoffmann; B. Kaulitz; R. Roth	Benzner; D. Roth; Hoffmann; Jost	4:01
4.	"Love is Dead"	D. Roth; Benzner; Jost; Hoffmann; T. Kaulitz; Georg Listing; Gustav Schafer; B. Kaulitz; R. Roth	Benzner; D. Roth; Hoffmann; Jost	3:42
5.	"Don't Jump"	D. Roth; Benzner; Jost; Hoffmann; T. Kaulitz; B. Kaulitz; R. Roth	Benzner; D. Roth; Hoffmann; Jost	4:09
6.	"On the Edge"	D. Roth; Benzner; Jost; Hoffmann; T. Kaulitz; B. Kaulitz; R. Roth	Benzner; D. Roth; Hoffmann; Jost	4:05
7.	"Sacred"	D. Roth; Benzner; Jost; Hoffmann; B. Kaulitz; R. Roth	Benzner; D. Roth; Hoffmann; Jost	4:03
8.	"Break Away"	D. Roth; Benzner; Jost; Hoffmann; T. Kaulitz; B. Kaulitz; Listing; Schafer; R. Roth	Benzner; D. Roth; Hoffmann; Jost	3:24
9.	"Rescue Me"	D. Roth; Benzner; Jost; B. Kaulitz; R. Roth	Benzner; D. Roth; Hoffmann; Jost	3:56
10.	"Final Day"	D. Roth; Benzner; Jost; B. Kaulitz; R. Roth	Benzner; D. Roth; Hoffmann; Jost	3:03
11.	"Forgotten Children"	D. Roth; Benzner; Jost; Hoffmann; T. Kaulitz; B. Kaulitz; R. Roth	Benzner; D. Roth; Hoffmann; Jost	4:34
12.	"By Your Side"	D. Roth; Benzner; Jost; Hoffmann; B. Kaulitz; R. Roth	Benzner; D. Roth; Hoffmann; Jost	4:24
Total length:				46:13

UK Bonus Tracks
No.	Title	Writer(s)	Composer(s)	Length
13.	"Live Every Second"	Roth; Benzner; Jost; B. Kaulitz	Roth; Benzner; Jost	3:55
14.	"Raise Your Hands" (Live in Madrid)			3:47

Canadian Bonus Tracks
No.	Title	Writer(s)	Composer(s)	Length
13.	"1000 Oceans"	Roth; Benzner; Jost; Hoffmann; B. Kaulitz	Roth; Benzner; Jost; Hoffmann; T. Kaulitz	3:55
14.	"Monsoon" (Live in Milan)			3:47

US and Brazil Bonus Tracks
No.	Title	Writer(s)	Composer(s)	Length
13.	"Live Every Second"	Roth; Benzner; Jost; B. Kaulitz	Roth; Benzner; Jost	3:50
14.	"1000 Oceans"	Roth; Benzner; Jost; Hoffmann; B. Kaulitz	Roth; Benzner; Jost; Hoffmann; T. Kaulitz	3:55
15.	"Durch den Monsun"	Roth; Benzner; Jost; Hoffmann; B. Kaulitz	Roth; Benzner; Jost; Hoffmann	3:47

US iTunes Bonus Track
No.	Title	Writer(s)	Composer(s)	Length
16.	"Black"	Roth; Benzner; Jost; Hoffmann; B. Kaulitz; Rebecca Roth	Roth; Benzner; Jost; Hoffmann; T. Kaulitz	3:21

US Hot Topic Bonus Track
No.	Title	Length
16.	"Raise Your Hands" (Studio version)	3:37

- Best Buy has an exclusive DVD with a behind the scenes look at their US concert shows and three live videos ("Scream", "Don't Jump" and "Rescue Me" live at the Roxy Concert Hall in Hollywood).

== Singles chronology ==
Europe (except UK) and Latin America

- "Monsoon"
- "Ready, Set, Go!"
- "Don't Jump" (Only Europe (except UK), Argentina and radio release in Costa Rica)

United Kingdom

- "Ready, Set, Go!"

United States and Canada

- "Scream"
- "Ready, Set, Go!"
- "Monsoon"

== Release history ==
Region	Date
Germany, Italy, Netherlands	1 June 2007
France, Portugal	4 June 2007
South Africa	27 September 2007
Canada	25 March 2008
United States	6 May 2008

== Charts ==
=== Weekly charts ===
Chart (2007–08)	Peak position
as Scream
Belgian Albums (Ultratop Flanders)	6
Belgian Albums (Ultratop Wallonia)	18
Canadian Albums (Billboard)	6
Danish Albums (Hitlisten)	29
Dutch Albums (Album Top 100)	10
Finnish Albums (Suomen virallinen lista)	27
French Albums (SNEP)	6
Greek Albums (IFPI)	5
Italian Albums (FIMI)	2
Mexican Albums (AMPROFON)	18
Norwegian Albums (VG-lista)	21
Portuguese Albums (AFP)	6
Spanish Albums (Promusicae)	24
Swedish Albums (Sverigetopplistan)	1
Swiss Albums (Schweizer Hitparade)	26
US Billboard 200	39
US Top Rock Albums (Billboard)	6
as Room 483
Austrian Albums (Ö3 Austria)	27

=== Year-end charts ===
Chart (2007)	Position
Belgian Albums (Ultratop Flanders)	25
Belgian Albums (Ultratop Wallonia)	52
Dutch Albums (Album Top 100)	86
Swedish Albums (Sverigetopplistan)	73
Chart (2008)	Position
Belgian Albums (Ultratop Flanders)	57

== Certifications ==
Region	Certification	Certified units/sales
Belgium (BRMA)	Gold	15,000^{*}
France (SNEP)	Gold	75,000^{*}
Greece (IFPI Greece)	Gold	7,500^{^}
Italy	—	100,000
Mexico (AMPROFON)	2× Gold	100,000^{^}
Portugal (AFP)	Platinum	20,000^{^}
Russia (NFPF)	2× Platinum	40,000^{*}
Spain (Promusicae)	Gold	40,000^{^}
United States	—	175,000
^{*} Sales figures based on certification alone.^{^} Shipments figures based on certification alone.

== Personnel ==
Performance credits

- Bill Kaulitz – lead vocals
- Tom Kaulitz – guitars, backing vocals
- Georg Listing – bass guitar, backing vocals
- Gustav Schäfer – drums, percussion

Technical credits

- Patrick Benzner – production, mixing
- Dave Roth – production, mixing
- David Jost – production
- Peter Hoffmann – production
- Manfred Faust – mixing
- Gateway – mastering
- Jens Boldt – photography
