= Heilig (Tokio Hotel song) =

Single by Tokio Hotel

from the album Zimmer 483
- B-side: "Break Away (Live in Milan)"
- Released: 28 April 2008 (France)
- Recorded: December 2006
- Genre: Alternative rock, pop rock
- Length: 4:03
- Label: Island, Universal Music
- Songwriters: Bill Kaulitz, Dave Roth, David Jost, Peter Hoffmann, Patrick Benzner
- Producers: Dave Roth, David Jost, Peter Hoffmann, Patrick Benzner

Tokio Hotel singles chronology
"Don't Jump" (2008)	"Heilig" (2008)	""Automatisch"/ "Automatic"" (2009)

"Heilig" (English: Holy), a song by the German rock band Tokio Hotel, appears on their second album, Zimmer 483. The song was released as the album's fourth single on 28 April in France. Due to tight scheduling, no music video for the single was released. It was translated and recorded for their first English album, Scream, as "Sacred" but it has not been released as a single.

== Formats and track listings ==
These are the formats and track listings of major single releases of "Heilig".

- CD Single
1. "Heilig" - 4:03
2. "Break away" (live in Milan) - 4:22
3. "1000 Meere" - 4:04

== Charts ==
Chart (2008)	Peak position
French Singles Chart	11
