= Übers Ende der Welt =

2007 single by Tokio Hotel

"Übers Ende Der Welt"

Single by Tokio Hotel

from the album Zimmer 483
- Language: German
- English title: "Over the End of the World"
- B-side: "Hilf mir fliegen"
- Released: 26 January 2007
- Genre: Alternative rock; pop rock
- Length: 3:35
- Label: Island; Universal
- Songwriters: Bill Kaulitz; Dave Roth; David Jost; Peter Hoffmann; Patrick Benzner
- Producers: Dave Roth; David Jost; Peter Hoffmann; Patrick Benzner

Tokio Hotel singles chronology
"Der letzte Tag" (2006)	"Übers Ende Der Welt" (2007)	"Spring nicht" (2007)

"Ready, Set, Go!"

Single by Tokio Hotel

from the album Scream and Room 483
- B-side: "Live Every Second"
- Released: 24 August 2007
- Genre: Alternative rock; pop rock
- Label: Universal
- Songwriters: Bill Kaulitz; Tom Kaulitz; Dave Roth; David Jost; Peter Hoffmann; Patrick Benzner
- Producers: Bill Kaulitz; Tom Kaulitz; Dave Roth; David Jost; Peter Hoffmann; Patrick Benzner

Tokio Hotel singles chronology
"Monsoon" (2007)	"Ready, Set, Go!" (2007)	"An Deiner Seite (Ich Bin Da)" (2007)

"Übers Ende der Welt" (English: "Over the End of the World") and "Ready, Set, Go!" are songs by German alternative rock band Tokio Hotel. The German version of the song, "Übers Ende der Welt", was released as the first single from their second album, Zimmer 483, and serves as the album's opening track. The key of the song is D-sharp minor.

The song was later translated into English and re-recorded for Tokio Hotel's first English-language album, Scream, under the title "Ready, Set, Go!". The English version was released as the second single from the album Scream in mainland Europe and was released as the band's debut single in the United Kingdom. This song was also released as the debut single in Canada via MuchMusic. The music video was nominated for the "Best Pop Video" award as well as winning the "Best New Artist" award at the 2008 MTV Video Music Awards.

Tokio Hotel collaborated with Jade Puget of AFI to create a remix of "Ready, Set, Go!". It was included as a bonus track on their album Scream.

== Music video ==
The music video for the German version, "Übers Ende der Welt", features the four band-members as workers walking through a bleak futuristic city along with a group of catatonic co-workers. All wear the same grey overalls while carrying large pipes. When the workers pass a corridor, they notice Tokio Hotel playing the song on a stage at the end of the corridor. The workers, including the band members in their worker-characters, run towards the performance and subsequently escape from the city by climbing up the walls of the sky-scrapers around the stage. Scenes of the catatonic workers in a dining hall, silently watching a test screen (which eventually explodes) are also included in the video. The video concludes with a shot of the band members (in their worker-characters) standing on top of one of the city's sky-scrapers, blinded by the sunlight. The music video is mostly inspired on Apple's 1984 Macintosh advertisement.

The most recent version of the music video for "Ready, Set, Go!" is visually identical to the German "Übers Ende der Welt" music video. In early 2008, an alternate music video for "Ready, Set, Go!" screened frequently shown on The N cable-television channel. The music video played in between commercial breaks. This version did not feature the band members portrayed as workers, but it did feature the band playing in front of the test screen seen in the original German music video.

== Track listings ==
- CD single: Übers Ende der Welt
1. "Übers Ende der Welt" (single version) – 3:35
2. "Übers Ende der Welt" (akustik version) – 3:27
- CD maxi single: Übers Ende der Welt
1. "Übers Ende der Welt" (single version) – 3:35
2. "Übers Ende der Welt" (akustik version) – 3:27
3. "Hilf mir fliegen" – 3:44
4. "Tokio Hotel in Moskau" (video)
5. "Tokio Hotel Gallery"
- 7-inch vinyl UK single: Ready, Set, Go!
1. "Ready, Set, Go!" – 3:34
2. "Black" – 3:21
- CD single: Ready, Set, Go!
1. "Ready, Set, Go!" – 3:34
2. "Übers Ende der Welt" (single version) – 3:35
3. "Übers Ende der Welt" (acoustic version) – 3:27
4. "Hilf mir fliegen" – 3:44
- CD UK single: Ready, Set, Go!
1. "Ready, Set, Go!" – 3:34
2. "Live Every Second" – 3:51
- CD maxi single: Ready, Set, Go!
1. "Ready, Set, Go!" – 3:34
2. "Ready, Set, Go!" (Grizzly remix) – 3:16
3. "Black" – 3:21
4. "Ready, Set, Go!" (music video)

== Charts ==
=== "Übers Ende der Welt" ===
==== Weekly charts ====
Chart (2007)	Peak position
Austria (Ö3 Austria Top 40)	1
Belgium (Ultratop 50 Wallonia)	30
Denmark (Tracklisten)	3
Europe (Eurochart Hot 100)	7
France (SNEP)	5
Germany (GfK)	1
Russia (TopHit)	96
Switzerland (Schweizer Hitparade)	2
Ukraine (TopHit)	188

==== Year-end charts ====
Chart (2007)	Position
Austria (Ö3 Austria Top 40)	63
Europe (Eurochart Hot 100)	72
France (SNEP)	38
Germany (Media Control GfK)	56

=== "Ready, Set, Go!" ===
Chart (2007)	Peak position
Belgium (Ultratop 50 Flanders)	26
Belgium (Ultratip Bubbling Under Wallonia)	5
Canada Hot 100 (Billboard)	80
Canada CHR/Top 40 (Billboard)	39
Netherlands (Dutch Top 40)	31
Netherlands (Single Top 100)	41
Russia (TopHit)	325
US Bubbling Under Hot 100 (Billboard)	19
Ukraine (TopHit)	150

== Release history ==
Region	Version	Date	Format(s)	Label(s)	Ref.
Germany	"Übers Ende der Welt"	26 January 2007	CD; maxi-CD	Island; Universal	
Europe	"Ready, Set, Go!"	24 August 2007	CD	Polydor	
United Kingdom	"Ready, Set, Go!"	27 August 2007	7-inch vinyl; CD	Polydor	
