= Durch den Monsun =

2005 single by Tokio Hotel

Single by Tokio Hotel

from the album Schrei
- Language: German
- English title: "Through the Monsoon"
- B-side: "Leb' die Sekunde"
- Released: 15 August 2005
- Genre: Alternative rock, pop rock
- Length: 3:55
- Label: Island, Universal Music
- Songwriters: Bill Kaulitz, Dave Roth, Patrick Benzner, David Jost
- Producers: Dave Roth, David Jost, Peter Hoffmann, Patrick Benzner

Tokio Hotel singles chronology
"Durch den Monsun" (2005)	"Schrei" (2005)

"Monsoon"

Single by Tokio Hotel

from the album Scream and Room 483
- B-side: "Black"
- Released: 18 May 2007
- Genre: Alternative rock, post-grunge, pop rock
- Length: 4:05
- Label: Universal
- Songwriters: Bill Kaulitz, Rebecca Roth, Dave Roth, Patrick Benzner, David Jost
- Producers: Dave Roth, Patrick Benzner, David Jost, Peter Hoffmann

Tokio Hotel singles chronology
"Spring Nicht" (2007)	"Monsoon" (2007)	"Ready, Set, Go!" (2007)

"Durch den Monsun" (English: "Through the Monsoon") and "Monsoon" are songs by German rock band Tokio Hotel. The German version of "Durch den Monsun" was released as the band's debut single in 2005 from their debut album, Schrei. The album Schrei also contains the Japanese version of the song. An English version named "Monsoon" was later recorded and included in the band's first English album, Scream, and released as their first English single in 2007.

In August 2020, Tokio Hotel announced new versions of "Durch den Monsun" and "Monsoon" to celebrate the single's 15th anniversary, with the German version appearing on Tokio Hotel's seventh album, 2001. "Durch den Monsun 2020" and "Monsoon 2020" were respectively released on 2 and 16 October 2020.

== History ==
Tokio Hotel released "Monsoon"—their first English-language single—in Europe on 18 May 2007. The vocals and melodies in "Monsoon" are one semitone lower than its German counterpart. The song was performed at the MTV Europe Music Awards 2007 in Munich, Germany.

"Durch den Monsun" was named "Best Song 2005" at the Austrian Golden Penguin Awards and was also nominated as "Best Single International" at the Amadeus Awards in 2006. In 2007, "Durch den Monsun" was voted "Single of the Year" at the Golden Penguin Awards in Austria while Monsoon won in the category "Best Video" at the TMF Awards in Belgium. In the following year Monsoon claimed the titles "Best Ringtone" and "Song of the Year" at Los Premios MTV Latinoamérica 2008, "Number 1 of the Year" at TRL Awards (Italy), and was also named "Best Mood Song" and "Song that Stays in your Head" by a Dutch magazine, Hitkrant.

In 2008, the song was included in a range of McDonald's Happy Meal toys in the UK. The toy was a small, portable music player that played a thirty-second snippet of Monsoon.

== Music videos ==
The music video for the German version of the song features a stage looking like it was shot underwater. It starts off Kaulitz holding a black candle sitting next to a broken door with no building behind it, then the candle's flame goes out. Many scenes feature Bill singing underwater and upside down. There is one scene where Tom Kaulitz appears to be singing along in a mirror-like door before disappearing.

The music video for the English version of the song, "Monsoon", was shot in Cape Town, South Africa in early May 2007. It features scenes of the band in a Bell UH-1 Huey helicopter and then free falling and landing on the ground. After they land, the band members walk to a stage (although scenes of them on the stage are already shown before the free fall scene) and start performing. As the song nears the end and the beat intensifies, a storm rumbles and heavy rain starts to fall on the band as they play. The video also shows scenes of lead singer Bill Kaulitz in the back of a black driverless Cadillac limousine with a typewriter.

== Track listings ==
- CD single
1. "Durch den Monsun (Radio Mix)" – 3:58
2. "Durch den Monsun (Unplugged Version)" – 3:58
- CD maxi single
1. "Durch den Monsun (Radio Mix)" – 3:58
2. "Durch den Monsun (Unplugged Version)" – 3:58
3. "モンスーンと超えて – Monsun to Koete (Japanese Grizzly Mix)" – 4:08
4. "Leb' die Sekunde" – 3:47
5. "Durch den Monsun" (music video) – 3:58
- German iTunes EP
1. "Durch den Monsun (Radio Mix)" – 3:58
2. "Durch den Monsun (Unplugged Version)" – 3:58
3. "モンスーンと超えて – Monsun to Koete (Japanese Grizzly Mix)" – 4:08
4. "Leb' die Sekunde" – 3:47
5. "Durch den Monsun (Grizzly Mix)" – 4:08
- English CD single
1. "Monsoon" – 4:00
2. "Black" – 3:21
- Durch den Monsun 2020 digital download
1. "Durch den Monsun 2020" – 3:55
- Monsoon 2020 digital download
1. "Monsoon 2020" – 3:55
2. "Durch den Monsun 2020" – 3:55

== Charts ==
=== "Durch den Monsun" ===
==== Weekly charts ====
Chart (2005–2007)	Peak position
Austria (Ö3 Austria Top 40)	1
Belgium (Ultratop 50 Wallonia)	6
Europe (Eurochart Hot 100)	6
France (SNEP)	8
Germany (GfK)	1
Netherlands (Single Top 100)	71
Switzerland (Schweizer Hitparade)	5

==== Year-end charts ====
Chart (2005)	Position
Austria (Ö3 Austria Top 40)	2
Europe (Eurochart Hot 100)	43
Germany (Media Control GfK)	2
Switzerland (Schweizer Hitparade)	25

Chart (2007)	Position
Belgium (Ultratop 50 Wallonia)	21
France (SNEP)	48

==== Decade-end charts ====
Chart (2000–2009)	Position
Germany (Media Control GfK)	96

=== "Monsoon" ===
==== Weekly charts ====
Chart (2007–2008)	Peak position
Belgium (Ultratop 50 Flanders)	8
Denmark (Tracklisten)	14
Italy (FIMI)	8
Netherlands (Dutch Top 40)	6
Netherlands (Single Top 100)	17
Portugal Digital Songs (Billboard)	1
Sweden (Sverigetopplistan)	23
Russia (TopHit)	344
Switzerland (Schweizer Hitparade)	69
Ukraine (TopHit)	159
US Pop 100 (Billboard)	84
Venezuela Pop Rock (Record Report)	1

==== Year-end charts ====
Chart (2007)	Position
Belgium (Ultratop 50 Flanders)	23
Italy (FIMI)	30
Netherlands (Dutch Top 40)	49
Netherlands (Single Top 100)	86

== Certifications ==
Region	Certification	Certified units/sales
Austria (IFPI Austria)	Gold	15,000^{*}
Belgium (BRMA)	Gold	25,000^{*}
Germany (BVMI)	Platinum	300,000^{‡}
^{*} Sales figures based on certification alone.^{‡} Sales+streaming figures based on certification alone.

== "Durch den Monsun 2020" and "Monsoon 2020" ==
"Durch den Monsun 2020" / "Monsoon 2020"

Single by Tokio Hotel

from the album 2001
- Released: 2 October 2020 (German version); 16 October 2020 (English version)
- Genre: Synthwave, pop rock
- Length: 3:55
- Label: Epic Germany
- Songwriters: Bill Kaulitz, Dave Roth, Patrick Benzner, David Jost, Tom Kaulitz
- Producer: B. Kaulitz

Tokio Hotel singles chronology
"Chateau" (2019)	"Durch den Monsun 2020" / "Monsoon 2020" (2020)	"Berlin" (2020)

=== Videos ===
The lyric video features various clips of rain, running water and droplets hitting puddles. Toward the end the video, Kaulitz bathes his face in water and frolicks in the rain. The video also features visual samples of the original German and English music videos.

The music video starts off with thunderstorms and Kaulitz applying his makeup in his dressing room. The video features various clips of Kaulitz singing in the rain, old clips of Tokio Hotel TV 2007–2008, snippets from older music videos including "Durch den Monsun"; "Monsoon"; "Automatisch"; "Something New", and snippets from older concerts and award shows. The music video ends with Kaulitz standing at the edge of a large swimming pool.

=== Live performances ===
The band performed "Durch den Monsun 2020" for the first time on the German late-night talk show Late Night Berlin, on 26 October 2020 on ProSieben. This was uploaded to Tokio Hotel's official YouTube account on the next day. The band recorded a live video performing "Monsoon 2020" live inside a wind tunnel on 27 November 2020, which was directed by Dennis Dirksen. The live video was subsequently uploaded to their official YouTube account as "Tokio Hotel - Monsoon 2020 Live @ Windkanal". A live video of "Durch den Monsun 2020" was also recorded inside the wind tunnel on the same day, which was subsequently uploaded to Filtr Germany's official YouTube account.

== Other versions ==
- In 2023, American singer Anastacia recorded an English-translated version, titled "Monsoon", for her album Our Songs.
