= Kings of Suburbia =

Studio album by Tokio Hotel
- Released: October 3, 2014
- Recorded: 2012–2014
- Genres: Electropop; synth-pop
- Length: 39:00 (standard edition); 52:52 (deluxe editions)
- Language: English
- Labels: Island; Polydor; De-Code LTD
- Producers: Bill Kaulitz; Tom Kaulitz

Tokio Hotel chronology
Darkside of the Sun (2011)	Kings of Suburbia (2014)	Dream Machine (2017)

Singles from Kings of Suburbia
- 1. "Run Run Run" Released: September 12, 2014; 2. "Love Who Loves You Back" Released: September 26, 2014; 3. "Feel It All" Released: April 3, 2015

Kings of Suburbia is the fifth studio album by German band Tokio Hotel. It was released by Island Records on October 3, 2014 in Germany and October 6 worldwide. Unlike their previous work which was released in both German and English, Kings of Suburbia was only released in English. The album is available at retail and online stores. There are four versions available at retail stores and Amazon.com [standard edition (11 tracks), deluxe edition (15 tracks and a DVD disc), vinyl deluxe edition (15 tracks in two vinyl discs) and limited super deluxe edition (a box set of a deluxe edition disc, a DVD disc, two deluxe edition vinyl discs, a cassette with two "Devilish" demo songs and a photo-book)]. There is only deluxe edition available at iTunes and Google Play Music which comes with a bonus video of an interview with the band.

== Background ==
On September 3, 2014 Bill Kaulitz posted the cover, name and release date of Kings of Suburbia on his Instagram page. Tokio Hotel announced on their Facebook page that one new song would be available on iTunes each Friday from September 12 until the release of the album on October 3.

On September 9 the band posted on their YouTube channel a video teaser of the first promotional single from Kings of Suburbia called "Run, Run, Run", while the full video was released on September 12. In the video, which is in black and white, Bill Kaulitz is seen singing seated while Tom Kaulitz is playing the piano. The video was directed by Gianluca Fellini.

On September 17 Tokio Hotel announced on their Facebook page that the second promotional single would be "Girl Got a Gun". The song was released on September 19, while a music video for it, directed by Kris Moyes, was released on September 23.

The lead single from Kings of Suburbia, "Love Who Loves You Back", was released digitally on September 26, while the music video directed by Marc Klasfeld was released on September 30.

The second single from the album will be "Feel It All". The music video for it was shot in Berlin. It will be released on March 27in support of the tour "Feel It All World Tour 2015".

== Evolution of style ==
Kings of Suburbia was recorded entirely in English, a first for the band. The genre is a mix of electronic and pop. As twins Bill and Tom Kaulitz composed and recorded in Los Angeles, the album shows the influence of the city's nightlife. Most of the songs were written by the band and the entire album was mixed and produced by Tom Kaulitz. Most songs were written on a computer but live instruments were added to get the sound they wanted.

== Commercial performance ==
The album is Tokio Hotel's most successful album on iTunes to date. It peaked at No. 1 in 30 countries and entered the Top 5 in 17 more countries.

== Other versions ==
The song "Run, Run, Run" was also recorded by American singer Kelly Clarkson (featuring John Legend) for her seventh studio album Piece by Piece.

== Track listings ==
All tracks written by Tom Kaulitz and Bill Kaulitz; additional co-writers listed below.

No.	Title	Writer(s)	Length
1.	"Feel It All"	Joacim Persson, David Jost	4:00
2.	"Stormy Weather"	Dave Roth, Patrick Benzner, Jost	3:29
3.	"Run, Run, Run"	Persson, Ry Cuming, Jost, Johan Alkenäs	3:25
4.	"Love Who Loves You Back"	Antonina Armato, Tim James, Jost, Thomas Armato Sturges	3:49
5.	"Covered in Gold"	Roth, Benzner, Jost	4:29
6.	"Girl Got a Gun"	Roth, Benzner, Jost	2:46
7.	"Kings of Suburbia"	Roth, Benzner	3:23
8.	"We Found Us"	Roth, Benzner	3:23
9.	"Invaded"	Roth, Benzner	3:28
10.	"Never Let You Down"	Roth, Benzner	3:13
11.	"Louder Than Love"	Armato, James, Jost	3:35
Total length:			39:00

Deluxe Edition
No.	Title	Writer(s)	Length
12.	"Masquerade"	Roth, Benzner	3:17
13.	"Dancing in the Dark"	Roth, Benzner	3:27
14.	"The Heart Get No Sleep"	Persson, Jost, Sebastian Arman	3:49
15.	"Great Day"	Roth, Benzner	3:19
Total length:			52:52

iTunes Deluxe Edition
No.	Title	Length
16.	"The Intimate Interview 'Time That We Have the Talk' (Video)"	24:20
Total length:		1:17:12

== Personnel ==
Performance credits

- Bill Kaulitz – lead vocals
- Tom Kaulitz – guitars, backing vocals
- Georg Listing – bass guitar, backing vocals
- Gustav Schäfer – drums

== Charts ==
Weekly chart performance for Kings of Suburbia
Chart (2025)	Peak position
Austrian Albums (Ö3 Austria)	8
Belgian Albums (Ultratop Flanders)	23
Belgian Albums (Ultratop Wallonia)	13
Czech Albums (ČNS IFPI)	15
Dutch Albums (Album Top 100)	23
French Albums (SNEP)	12
German Albums (Offizielle Top 100)	2
Italian Albums (FIMI)	5
Portuguese Albums (AFP)	27
Spanish Albums (Promusicae)	17
Swiss Albums (Schweizer Hitparade)	11

== Release history ==
Kings of Suburbia release history
Region	Date	Label
Germany	October 3, 2014	Island/Polydor
Worldwide	October 6, 2014	Island/Polydor
United States	November 24, 2014	De-Code LTD
