= Best Of (Tokio Hotel album) =

Best Of TH

Compilation album by Tokio Hotel
- Released: December 13, 2010
- Recorded: 2003–2010
- Languages: German; English
- Label: Island
- Producers: David Roth; Patrick Benzner; David Jost; Peter Hoffmann; Tom Kaulitz; Bill Kaulitz

Tokio Hotel chronology
Humanoid City Live (2010)	Best Of TH (2010)	Darkside of the Sun (2011)

Singles from English Best Of TH
- 1. "Hurricanes and Suns" Released: December 14, 2010

Singles from German Best Of TH
- 1. "Mädchen aus dem All" Released: December 14, 2010

Best Of TH is the first compilation album by German rock band Tokio Hotel, it was released on December 13, 2010 in Germany, and December 14, 2010 internationally.

The album is composed of songs from their studio albums Schrei (2005), Zimmer 483 (2007), Scream (2007) and Humanoid (2009), plus two previously unreleased songs; the first, "Mädchen aus dem All", was originally recorded to be released on Schrei while the second song, "Hurricanes And Suns", was recorded in 2009. It was released in three major formats: standard edition, German and English; and a limited deluxe edition, including both German and English editions and a bonus DVD comprising the majority of Tokio Hotel's music videos and the "Making Of" videos for selected music videos.

== Track listing ==
=== German version ===
No.	Title	Writer(s)	Original album	Length
1.	"Durch den Monsun"	Bill Kaulitz; Dave Roth; Patrick Benzner; David Jost; Peter Hoffmann	Schrei	3:56
2.	"Der letzte Tag"	Roth; Benzner; Jost; B. Kaulitz	Schrei	3:04
3.	"Mädchen aus dem All"	B. Kaulitz; Tom Kaulitz	Previously unreleased	3:26
4.	"Übers Ende der Welt"	Roth; Benzner; Jost; Hoffman; B. Kaulitz; T. Kaulitz	Zimmer 483	3:33
5.	"Schrei"	Roth; Jost	Schrei	3:17
6.	"An deiner Seite (Ich bin da)"	Roth; Benzner; Jost; Hoffman; B. Kaulitz	Zimmer 483	4:24
7.	"Spring nicht"	Roth; Benzner; Jost; Hoffman; B. Kaulitz; T. Kaulitz	Zimmer 483	4:09
8.	"Automatisch"	Roth; Benzner; Jost; B. Kaulitz; T. Kaulitz	Humanoid	3:16
9.	"Lass uns laufen"	Roth; Benzner; Jost; Guy Chambers; B. Kaulitz; T. Kaulitz	Humanoid	4:15
10.	"Geisterfahrer" (featuring Jana Pallaske)	Roth; Benzner; Jost; B. Kaulitz; T. Kaulitz	Humanoid	4:29
11.	"Ich brech aus"	Roth; Benzner; Jost; Hoffman; B. Kaulitz; Georg Listing; Gustav Schäfer	Zimmer 483	3:24
12.	"Für immer jetzt"	Roth; Benzner; Jost; B. Kaulitz; T. Kaulitz	Humanoid	3:37
13.	"Rette mich"	Roth; Benzner; Jost	Schrei	3:42
14.	"1000 Meere"	Benzner; Hoffman; Jost; B. Kaulitz; Roth	Non-album single	4:04
15.	"Komm"	Roth; Benzner; Jost; B. Kaulitz; T. Kaulitz	Humanoid	3:53
16.	"Sonnensystem"	Roth; Benzner; Jost; B. Kaulitz; T. Kaulitz	Humanoid	3:52
17.	"Humanoid"	Roth; Benzner; Jost; B. Kaulitz; T. Kaulitz	Humanoid	3:45
18.	"Hurricanes and Suns" (bonus track)	B. Kaulitz; T. Kaulitz; Roth; Jost; Benzner	Previously unreleased	3:22
Total length:				68:28

=== English version ===
No.	Title	Writer(s)	Original album	Length
1.	"Darkside of the Sun"	Dave Roth; Patrick Benzner; David Jost; Bill Kaulitz; Tom Kaulitz	Humanoid	3:52
2.	"Monsoon"	D. Roth; Benzner; Jost; Peter Hoffman; B. Kaulitz; Rebecca Roth	Scream	4:01
3.	"Hurricanes and Suns"	B. Kaulitz; T. Kaulitz; D. Roth; Jost; Benzner	Previously unreleased	3:22
4.	"Ready, Set, Go!"	D. Roth; Benzner; Jost; Hoffman; T. Kaulitz; B. Kaulitz; R. Roth	Scream	3:34
5.	"World Behind My Wall"	D. Roth; Benzner; Jost; Guy Chambers; B. Kaulitz; T. Kaulitz	Humanoid	4:15
6.	"Scream"	D. Roth; Jost; R. Roth	Scream	3:21
7.	"Automatic"	D. Roth; Benzner; Jost; B. Kaulitz; T. Kaulitz	Humanoid	3:16
8.	"Phantomrider"	D. Roth; Benzner; Jost; B. Kaulitz; T. Kaulitz	Humanoid	4:29
9.	"Break Away"	D. Roth; Benzner; T. Kaulitz; Georg Listing; Gustav Schäfer; R. Roth	Scream	3:24
10.	"Final Day"	D. Roth; Benzner; Jost; B. Kaulitz; R. Roth	Scream	3:03
11.	"Forever Now"	D. Roth; Benzner; Jost; B. Kaulitz; T. Kaulitz	Humanoid	3:37
12.	"By Your Side"	D. Roth: Benzner; Jost; Hoffman; B. Kaulitz; R. Roth	Scream	4:24
13.	"Rescue Me"	D. Roth; Benzner; Jost; B. Kaulitz; R. Roth	Scream	3:56
14.	"1000 Oceans"	D. Roth; Benzner; Jost; Hoffmann; B. Kaulitz	Scream	3:55
15.	"Noise"	D. Roth; Benzner; Jost; B. Kaulitz; T. Kaulitz	Humanoid	3:53
16.	"Don’t Jump"	D. Roth; Benzner; Jost; Hoffmann; T. Kaulitz; B. Kaulitz; R. Roth	Scream	4:09
17.	"Humanoid"	D. Roth; Benzner; Jost; B. Kaulitz; T. Kaulitz	Humanoid	3:45
18.	"Mädchen aus dem All" (bonus track)	B. Kaulitz; T. Kaulitz	Previously unreleased	3:26
Total length:				68:42

=== Limited Deluxe edition ===
Features the tracks found on the English and German editions on two CDs but also one bonus DVD of all the band's music videos, with the exceptions of "1000 Meere" and "1000 Oceans", as well as the "Making Of" videos of six selected music videos.

DVD 1 - Music Videos

1. "Durch den Monsun"
2. "Monsoon"
3. "Schrei"
4. "Scream"
5. "Rette mich"
6. "Der letzte Tag"
7. "Wir schliessen uns ein"
8. "Übers Ende der Welt"
9. "Ready, Set, Go!"
10. "Spring nicht"
11. "Don't Jump"
12. "An deiner Seite (Ich bin da)"
13. "By Your Side"
14. "Automatisch"
15. "Automatic"
16. "Lass uns laufen"
17. "World Behind my Wall"
18. "Darkside of the Sun"

Making of

1. Making of "Monsoon" (subtitled)
2. Making of "Schrei" (lacking subtitles)
3. Making of "Übers Ende der Welt" (subtitled)
4. Making of "Spring Nicht" (lacking subtitles)
5. Making of "Automatic" (lacking subtitles)
6. Making of "World Behind My Wall" (subtitled)

== Personnel ==
- Vocals: Bill Kaulitz
- Guitars: Tom Kaulitz
- Bass: Georg Listing
- Drums: Gustav Schäfer
- Executive producers: Patrick Benzer, Dave Roth, David Jost, Peter Hoffman
- Co-producers: Bill Kaulitz and Tom Kaulitz
- Management: David Jost and Benjamin Ebel

== Charts ==
Chart (2010–11)	Peak position
Dutch Albums (Album Top 100)	95
Greek Albums (IFPI Greece)	24
Italian Albums (FIMI)	38
Mexican Albums (Top 100 Mexico)	22
Spanish Albums (PROMUSICAE)	49
Swiss Albums (Schweizer Hitparade)	97
