= Darkside of the Sun =

Compilation album by Tokio Hotel
- Released: February 2, 2011 (Japan)
- Recorded: 2006–2010
- Genres: Pop rock; alternative rock; electronic rock
- Languages: English; German
- Label: Universal Music Japan
- Producers: David Roth; Patrick Benzner; David Jost; Peter Hoffmann; Tom Kaulitz; Bill Kaulitz

Tokio Hotel chronology
Best Of TH (2010)	Darkside of the Sun (2011)	Kings of Suburbia (2014)

Deluxe version cover

Darkside of the Sun is the second compilation album by German rock band Tokio Hotel, released exclusively in Japan. It was released February 2, 2011 after the success of the song "Darkside of the Sun" in Japan. The band won Best Rock Video at 2011 MTV Video Music Aid Japan for it and performed live at the ceremony. The album is composed of songs from their studio albums Scream (2007) and Humanoid (2009). The Deluxe version also includes songs from Humanoid City Live (2010) and maxi single "Ready, Set, Go!". The album was released in two versions: a standard version (13 songs) and a deluxe version (16 songs and a bonus DVD). The deluxe version bonus DVD includes eight of the band's music videos (six in English and two in German), five Tokio Hotel TV episodes and an interview with the band.

== Track listing ==
No.	Title	Writer(s)	Original album	Length
1.	"Noise"	Bill Kaulitz, Tom Kaulitz	Humanoid	3:53
2.	"Darkside of the Sun"	Bill Kaulitz, Tom Kaulitz	Humanoid	3:52
3.	"World Behind My Wall"	Bill Kaulitz, Tom Kaulitz	Humanoid	4:15
4.	"Ready, Set, Go!"	Bill Kaulitz, Dave Roth, Patrick Benzner, David Jost, Peter Hoffmann	Scream	3:34
5.	"Monsoon"	Bill Kaulitz, Dave Roth, Patrick Benzner, David Jost, Peter Hoffmann	Scream	4:01
6.	"Scream"	Dave Roth, David Jost	Scream	3:21
7.	"Forever Now"	Bill Kaulitz, Tom Kaulitz	Humanoid	3:37
8.	"Automatic"	Bill Kaulitz, Tom Kaulitz	Humanoid	3:16
9.	"Humanoid"	Bill Kaulitz, Tom Kaulitz	Humanoid	3:45
10.	"Break Away"	Bill Kaulitz, Dave Roth, Patrick Benzner, David Jost, Peter Hoffmann	Scream	3:24
11.	"Phantomrider"	Bill Kaulitz, Tom Kaulitz	Humanoid	4:29
12.	"Dogs Unleashed"	Bill Kaulitz, Tom Kaulitz	Humanoid	3:41
13.	"By Your Side"	Bill Kaulitz, Dave Roth, Patrick Benzner, David Jost, Peter Hoffmann	Scream	4:24
Total length:				49:32

Deluxe Version
No.	Title	Writer(s)	Original album	Length
14.	"Darkside of the Sun" (Live)	Bill Kaulitz, Tom Kaulitz	Humanoid City Live	3:54
15.	"Sonnensystem"	Bill Kaulitz, Tom Kaulitz	Humanoid	3:52
16.	"Ready, Set, Go!" (Grizzly Remix)	Bill Kaulitz, Dave Roth, Patrick Benzner, David Jost, Peter Hoffmann	"Ready, Set, Go!" maxi-single	3:16
Total length:				60:34

== Bonus DVD content ==
=== Music videos ===
1. "Darkside of the Sun"
2. "Automatic"
3. "World Behind My Wall"
4. "Ready, Set, Go!"
5. "Monsoon"
6. "Scream"
7. "Lass Uns Laufen"
8. "Schrei"

=== Tokio Hotel TV ===
1. Interview above the clouds
2. MTV VMA 2008: Music, mayhem, Tokio Hotel
3. Dreams come true...and now it's partytime
4. Intimate confessions
5. Humanoid City Live

=== Interview ===
1. Questions & answers
