= Humanoid City Live =

- Bill Kaulitz, singer of Tokio Hotel, performing in Paris, France, on April 14, 2010

Live album (CD/DVD) by Tokio Hotel
- Released: July 20, 2010
- Recorded: April 12, 2010
- Venue: Mediolanum Forum
- Genres: Pop rock; electronic rock; Alternative Rock; Emo Rock
- Languages: English; German
- Label: Island

Tokio Hotel chronology
Humanoid (2009)	Humanoid City Live (2010)	Best Of TH (2010)

Tokio Hotel video chronology
Tokio Hotel TV - Caught On Camera (2008)	Humanoid City Live (2010)	Hinter die Welt (2017)

Singles from Humanoid City Live
- 1. "Darkside of the Sun (Live)" Released: June 24, 2010

Humanoid City Live is a live DVD and CD by German band Tokio Hotel, released on July 20, 2010. It was recorded on April 12, 2010, at the Mediolanum Forum in Milan, Italy, during their Welcome to Humanoid City Tour. The DVD bonus material includes a new "backstage" episode of Tokio Hotel TV, and a photo gallery. The tour dates in Europe in 2010 were formally announced Thursday October 22, 2009. The tour started on February 22 and visited 32 cities in major concert halls.

== CD/DVD track listing ==
1. "Noise"
2. "Human Connect to Human"
3. "Break Away"
4. "Pain of Love"
5. "World Behind My Wall"
6. "Hey You"
7. "Alien" (English Version)
8. "Ready, Set, Go!"
9. "Humanoid" (German Version)
10. "Phantomrider"
11. "Dogs Unleashed"
12. "Love & Death"
13. "In Your Shadow (I Can Shine)"
14. "Automatic"
15. "Screamin'"
16. "Darkside of the Sun"
17. "Zoom Into Me"
18. "Monsoon"
19. "Forever Now"

== Chart positions ==
=== Weekly charts ===
Chart performance for Humanoid City Live
Chart (2010)	Peak position
Austrian Albums (Ö3 Austria)	58
Austrian Music DVD (Ö3 Austria)	5
Belgian Albums (Ultratop Flanders)	74
Belgian Albums (Ultratop Wallonia)	37
Belgian Music DVD (Ultratop Flanders)	3
Belgian Music DVD (Ultratop Wallonia)	1
Czech Albums (IFPI)	3
Czech Music DVD (IFPI)	1
Danish Music DVD (Hitlisten)	3
Dutch Albums (Album Top 100)	59
Dutch Music DVD (MegaCharts)	4
Finnish Music DVD (Suomen virallinen lista)	2
French Albums (SNEP)	25
French Music DVD (SNEP)	1
German Music DVD (GfK Entertainment)	1
Greek Albums (IFPI)	4
Italian Albums (FIMI)	9
Italian Music DVD (FIMI)	2
Mexican Albums (AMPROFON)	15
Norwegian Music DVD (VG-lista)	3
Portuguese Music DVD (AFP)	2
Spanish Albums (Promusicae)	36
Spanish Music DVD (Promusicae)	2
Swedish Albums (Sverigetopplistan)	33
Swedish Music DVD (Sverigetopplistan)	1
Swiss Music DVD (Schweizer Hitparade)	1
Taiwanese Music DVD (G-Music)	1
