= Feel It All (Tokio Hotel song) =

2015 single by Tokio Hotel

Single by Tokio Hotel

from the album Kings of Suburbia
- Released: April 3, 2015
- Length: 4:00
- Label: Polydor; Island; De-Code LTD
- Songwriter(s): Bill Kaulitz; Tom Kaulitz; Joacim Persson; David Jost
- Producer(s): Rock Mafia; B. Kaulitz; T. Kaulitz; Jost; David Roth; Patrick Benzner; Peter Hoffmann

Tokio Hotel singles chronology
"Love Who Loves You Back" (2014)	"Feel It All" (2015)	"Something New" (2017)

"Feel It All" is the second single from German rock band Tokio Hotel's fifth studio album Kings of Suburbia. It was released on 3 April 2015. The single includes the original version of "Feel It All", a live version performed at Brandenburg Gate, a remix made by a Los Angeles–based DJ Pionear and remix versions of the previous single Love Who Loves You Back by Pionear and Swedish electronic music duo Cazzette.

== Music video ==
The music video was shot in Berlin. It shows the life of a group of substance-dependent people. It reflects the real life of drug-addicted people: how they use drugs, do unpredicted things, become aggressive and die of overdose. Bill Kaulitz plays the main role. The video starts with a small interview with Bill as a drug-addicted person. He is asked what is his favorite childhood memory but he doesn't remember. Then he walks alone along the streets and finds a group of other drug-addicted people. Once Bill wastes all his money on drugs he turns to prostitution to buy more drugs.

== Track listing ==
- CD maxi single, *Digital download EP

#	Title	Length
1	"Feel It All"	4:00
2	"Feel It All" – Live In Berlin / 2014	4:16
3	"Feel It All" – Pionear Remix	4:15
4	"Love Who Loves You Back" – Pionear & Kyle Tree Remix	4:01
5	"Love Who Loves You Back" – Cazzette Remix	3:47

== Release history ==
Region	Date	Format	Label	Ref.
Worldwide	April 3, 2015	Digital download	Polydor/Island, De-Code LTD	
Worldwide	April 3, 2015	CD single	Polydor/Island, De-Code LTD	
