= Love Who Loves You Back =

Single by Tokio Hotel

from the album Kings of Suburbia
- Released: 26 September 2014
- Genre: Pop rock; electronic rock; synthwave
- Length: 3:49
- Label: Polydor; Island
- Songwriter(s): Bill Kaulitz; Tom Kaulitz; Antonina Armato; Tim James; David Jost; Thomas Armato Sturges
- Producer(s): Rock Mafia; Devrim Karaoglu; Adam Comstock; TAS; Tom Kaulitz

Tokio Hotel singles chronology
"Darkside of the Sun" (2011)	"Love Who Loves You Back" (2014)	"Feel It All" (2015)

"Love Who Loves You Back" is a song by German rock band Tokio Hotel from their fifth studio album, Kings of Suburbia (2014). It was released on 26 September 2014 as the album's lead single.

== Music video ==
The music video, directed by Marc Klasfeld, was shot in Los Angeles. A 30-second teaser of the music video was posted on the Official Tokio Hotel Facebook page. The music video was released 30 September 2014 on the band's official Facebook page and 1 October on the band's official YouTube channel.

== Track listing ==
- Digital download
1. "Love Who Loves You Back" – 3:49

== Charts ==
Weekly chart performance for "Love Who Loves You Back"
Chart (2014)	Peak position
Austria (Ö3 Austria Top 40)	39
CIS Airplay (TopHit)	8
France (SNEP)	88
Germany (GfK)	38
Russia Airplay (TopHit)	9
Switzerland (Schweizer Hitparade)	65
Ukraine Airplay (TopHit)	36

=== Year-end charts ===
Year-end chart performance for "Love Who Loves You Back"
Chart (2014)	Position
Russia Airplay (TopHit)	110
