= Encore (Tokio Hotel album) =

Studio album by Tokio Hotel
- Released: 16 October 2026
- Recorded: 2024–26
- Genre: Pop rock
- Length: 31:11
- Language: English
- Labels: Tokio Hotel; OPEN
- Producers: Bill Kaulitz; Tom Kaulitz

Tokio Hotel chronology
| 2001 (2022) | Encore (2026) |

Singles from Encore
- 1. "Changes" Released: 14 November 2025; 2. "California Nights" Released: 27 February 2026; 3. "Memory Lane" Released: 22 May 2026; 4. "Without You" Released: 24 July 2026; 5. "Dye My Hair" Released: 4 September 2026; 6. "Perfect Ending" Released: 16 October 2026; 7. "1990s" Released: 13 November 2026

Encore is the eighth studio album by German band Tokio Hotel released on October 16, 2026.

Mainly produced by guitarist Tom Kaulitz alongside other co-producers, the album marks a musical direction focused on alternative pop-rock and synth-pop. Upon its release, Encore received mixed reviews from music critics; while some praised the sharper instrumental arrangements, subtle guitar work, and lyrical honesty, others criticized the record for its formulaic production and for staying within a commercial comfort zone.

== Background and recording ==
Following a period of heightened multimedia visibility, including the launch of their successful Spotify podcast Kaulitz Hills – Senf aus Hollywood and the 2024 Netflix docuseries Kaulitz & Kaulitz, Tokio Hotel began shifts back toward their core musical output. The preparation for the album took place primarily at guitarist and main producer Tom Kaulitz's home studio in Los Angeles, California. This geographic and creative setting allowed the band to collaborate both locally and remotely with various European and American production teams, resulting in a cohesive blend of 1990s alternative pop-rock and modern synth-pop influences.

The band officially announced the title of their eighth studio album, Encore, on May 27, 2026, alongside the release of its lead single, "Memory Lane". Lyrically, the album serves as a thematic continuation of the band's career evolution, contrasting their lighthearted and self-ironic public personas with heavily serious and introspective songwriting. The tracklist deeply explores raw personal reflections, tackling themes of substance use, emotional heartbreak, and the struggles of balancing fame with personal vulnerability under a polished production surface.

== Reception ==
Professional ratings
Aggregate scores
| Source | Rating |
|---|---|
| Album of the Year | 51/100 |
Review scores
| Source | Rating |
| Flyctory.com | 4/5 stars |
| Musikexpress | 3/6 stars |
| Plattentests.de | 5/10 stars |
| Sleek Magazine | 3.5/5 stars |

Encore received mixed to negative reception from contemporary music critics, who frequently questioned the album's lack of musical innovation and its reliance on formulaic production. On review aggregator Album of the Year, the album received an average score of 51 out of 100 based on 7 reviews from critics.

Reviewing for Plattentests.de, the record was described as a generic, interchangeable, and harmless pop-rock effort, with critics noting that the band has largely transitioned into a US-industry-backed mainstream act. Similarly, Rebecca Spilker of Musikexpress dismissed the album's sound as "pathos-pop, fresh from L.A., staying in its comfort zone," arguing that the songs lack standalone power without the accompanying visual component of the band's elaborate live shows and television presence. The Berliner Zeitung and Die Zeit both noted a sharp contrast between the twins' self-ironic media personas and the deeply serious, earnest tone maintained throughout the tracklist, characterizing the sound as cozy 1990s consensus radio rock.

Conversely, some reviewers offered more favorable assessments of the band's sonic progression. Sleek Magazine praised the album's structural restraint, sharper arrangements, and subtle guitar work, highlighting tracks like "Homesick" as a successful evolution where the group functions "as a band first and a story second." Additionally, reviews from Flyctory.com and UV Music Magazine noted that while the "record suffers from occasional repetition, its tracks remain highly accessible, showcasing a reflective and emotionally honest attitude well-suited for individual playlist curation".

== Track listing ==
Track listing is from the official Tokio Hotel page. The tracklist is from the Deluxe edition of Encore.

| No. | Title | Writer(s) | Producer(s) | Length |
|---|---|---|---|---|
| 1. | "Changes" | Bill Kaulitz; Tom Kaulitz; Vitali Zestovskih; Johannes Bianiek | Kaulitz; Kaulitz; Zestovskih; Bianiek | 2:35 |
| 2. | "Without You" | Bill Kaulitz; Tom Kaulitz; Jeremiah Daly; Alex Borel; Colin Foote; Alex Coste | Bill Kaulitz; Tom Kaulitz; Borel; Foote; Koste | 2:50 |
| 3. | "Call Me By Your Name" | Bill Kaulitz; Tom Kaulitz; Binge; Ebsen; Jeremiah Daly | Tom Kaulitz; Binge | 2:39 |
| 4. | "Lover's Cove" | Bill Kaulitz | Tom Kaulitz | 2:26 |
| 5. | "Memory Lane" | Bill Kaulitz; Tom Kaulitz | Tom Kaulitz | 2:45 |
| 6. | "Wanderlust" | Bill Kaulitz; Tom Kaulitz; Borel; Foote; Daly; VitaliZe | Tom Kaulitz; Bill Kaulitz; Borel; Koste; Foote; Bieniek; VitaliZe | 3:25 |
| 7. | "Shout 2 The Universe" | Bill Kaulitz; Tom Kaulitz; Jaro Omar; Ferras Alqaisi; Michael Fatkin | Tom Kaulitz; Fatkin | 2:51 |
| 8. | "Homesick" | Bill Kaulitz; Tom Kaulitz; David Lucius King; Shelly King; Jemima King | Tom Kaulitz; David Lucius King | 2:54 |
| 9. | "Dye My Hair" | Bill Kaulitz; Tom Kaulitz; Binge; Ebsen | Tom Kaulitz; Binge; Ebsen | 3:27 |
| 10. | "Terminal 1" | Bill Kaulitz; Tom Kaulitz; Binge; Ebsen | Tom Kaulitz; Binge; Ebsen | 2:50 |
| 11. | "California Nights" | Bill Kaulitz; Tom Kaulitz; Tim James; Antonina Armato | Rock Mafia; Tom Kaulitz | 3:53 |
| 12. | "Perfect Ending" | Bill Kaulitz; Tom Kaulitz; Flo August; Alex Knolle; Merrari | Tom Kaulitz; August; Knolle; Merrari | 2:39 |
| 13. | "1990s" | Bill Kaulitz; Tom Kaulitz; Robert Wallner; Maarten Paul; Benny Morrell | Tom Kaulitz; Wallner; Paul | 2:51 |
| 14. | "Encore" |
| Total length: | | | | 35:11 |

== Personnel ==
Tokio Hotel

- Bill Kaulitz – lead vocals
- Tom Kaulitz – guitars, keyboards, backing vocals
- Georg Listing – bass, backing vocals
- Gustav Schäfer – drums

== Charts ==
| Chart (2026) | Peak position |
|---|---|
| Austrian Albums (Ö3 Austria) | 8 |
| Belgian Albums (Ultratop Flanders) | 13 |
| Belgian Albums (Ultratop Wallonia) | 41 |
| French Albums (SNEP) | 76 |
| German Albums (Offizielle Top 100) | 3 |
| Italian Physical Albums (FIMI) | 15 |
| Swiss Albums (Schweizer Hitparade) | 7 |
