= White Lies (Vize and Tokio Hotel song) =

2021 song by Vize and Tokio Hotel

Single by Vize and Tokio Hotel

from the album 2001
- Released: 15 January 2021
- Length: 3:03
- Label: Epic Germany; Sony Music Germany
- Songwriters: Bill Kaulitz; Tom Kaulitz; DJ Johannes Vimalavong; Vitali Zestovskih; Leonie Burger; Claudio Marselli
- Producers: T. Kaulitz; J Vimalavong; V Zestovskih

Tokio Hotel singles chronology
"Berlin" (2020)	"White Lies" (2021)	"Behind Blue Eyes" (2021)

VIZE singles chronology
"Lonely" (2020)	"White Lies" (2021)	"I Miss U" (2021)

"White Lies" is a song by German EDM duo Vize and German rock band Tokio Hotel, from the latter's seventh studio album 2001. It was released as a single on 15 January 2021. Two remixes of the song were released later that year; one by German DJ NOØN on 2 April 2021, and the other by German DJ duo HBz on 7 May 2021. "White Lies" was used as the opening theme for Season 16 of Germany's Next Topmodel.

== Lyric video ==
The lyric video contains various environments under a red/blue overlay with the lyrics appearing on the screen.

== Music video ==
The music video stars all members of Tokio Hotel, plus DJ Johannes and Vitali from VIZE. Shot and photographed by Christoph Köstlin and Dennis Dirksen, and directed by Barış Aladağ, the video shows the members of Tokio Hotel and VIZE floating around with their instruments, with Bill singing the song. The colours shift from red to blue, to black, like a rave party setting.

During production of the video, Tokio Hotel shared photos of the band's videoshoot on their official Instagram page.

== White Lies Cover Challenge ==
With the song becoming popular in the social media world, Tokio Hotel started the White Lies Cover Challenge, which is a social media competition where they would ask fans to create their own cover of the song in any genre on video and to submit it to them on Instagram, Facebook or Twitter by 4 April 2021 using the hashtag #WhiteLiesCoverChallenge.

The winning covers would then be used by the band in a fan video version of the song. This was uploaded to their official YouTube account on 15 April 2021.

== Track listing ==
Digital download
No.	Title	Length
1.	"White Lies"	3:03
2.	"White Lies" (HBz Remix)	2:58
3.	"White Lies" (NOØN Remix)	3:07

== Charts ==
=== Weekly charts ===
Weekly chart performance for "White Lies"
Chart (2021)	Peak position
Austria (Ö3 Austria Top 40)	17
CIS Airplay (TopHit)	26
Germany (GfK)	13
Switzerland (Schweizer Hitparade)	28
Hungary (Single Top 40)	40
Russia Airplay (TopHit)	18

=== Year-end charts ===
Year-end chart performance for "White Lies"
Chart (2021)	Position
Austria (Ö3 Austria Top 40)	56
CIS (TopHit)	73
Germany (Official German Charts)	50
Russia Airplay (TopHit)	54
Switzerland (Schweizer Hitparade)	78

== Certifications ==
Certifications for "White Lies"
Region	Certification	Certified units/sales
Austria (IFPI Austria)	Platinum	30,000^{‡}
Germany (BVMI)	Gold	200,000^{‡}
^{‡} Sales+streaming figures based on certification alone.

== Release history ==
Release history and formats for "White Lies"
Region	Date	Version	Format	Label	Ref(s)
Various	15 January 2021	Original	Digital download	Epic	
Various	2 April 2021	NOØN remix	Digital download	Epic	
Various	7 May 2021	HBz remix	Digital download	Epic	
