= Tokio Hotel TV – Caught on Camera =

Video by Tokio Hotel
- Released: 9 December 2008
- Recorded: 2008
- Genres: Pop rock Teen pop
- Language: German
- Labels: Island, Universal Music

Tokio Hotel chronology
Zimmer 483 – Live in Europe (2007)	Tokio Hotel TV – Caught on Camera (2008)	Humanoid City Live (2010)

Tokio Hotel TV – Caught on Camera is a DVD released by the German band Tokio Hotel on 9 December 2008. It provides an exclusive behind the scenes view of the Tokio Hotel's Concerts and the very best of Tokio Hotel TV.

== Track listing ==
=== Standard Version ===
Track #	Title
1	"Intro"
2	"Tel Aviv, Paris, Cannes, Essen"
3	"TH-TV: MTV Europe Music Awards 2007"
4	"Montreal, Toronto, Los Angeles"
5	"TH-TV: Climbing with Gustav and Georg"
6	"New York City"
7	"TH-TV: On the Kart Track with Tom, Gustav and Georg"
8	"New York City, Oberhausen"
9	"TH-TV: Hot Topics @ Hot Topic"
10	"TH-TV: Interview above the clouds"
11	"Lisbon, Paris"
12	"TH-TV: Shopping with Bill"
13	"Modena, Genf"
14	"Werchter, Mexico City"
15	"TH-TV: MTV VMA 2008: Music, Mayhem, Tokio Hotel"

=== Deluxe Version ===
The deluxe version also comes with a poster of the band inside the DVD box.

Track #	Title
1	"Interview - Part 1"
2	"TH TV: Desert, Dust & Gasoline: Quad Biking with Tokio Hotel!"
3	"Interview - Part 2"
4	"TH TV: Past Time Secrets and Future Sins!"
5	"Interview - Part 3"
6	"Bill and Tom in the studio"
7	"Interview - Part 4"
8	"TH TV: Back on Track: Bill's Revenge!?"
9	"Interview - Part 5"
10	"TH TV: Pain and Paint: Tokio Hotel pull the trigger!!!"

=== Limited Fan Package Version ===
This version comes with a deluxe version of the DVD plus a brand new T-shirt of the band to accompany.

== Charts ==
Chart performance for Tokio Hotel TV – Caught on Camera
Chart (2008–2009)	Peak position
Austrian Music DVD (Ö3 Austria)	5
Danish Music DVD (Hitlisten)	6
Dutch Music DVD (MegaCharts)	3
Finnish Music DVD (Suomen virallinen lista)	2
French Music DVD (SNEP)	3
Norwegian Music DVD (VG-lista)	1
Portuguese Music DVD (AFP)	1
Spanish Music DVD (Promusicae)	2
Swedish Music DVD (Sverigetopplistan)	3
Swiss Music DVD (Schweizer Hitparade)	3

== Certifications ==
Region	Certification	Certified units/sales
France (SNEP) video	2× Platinum	40,000^{*}
^{*} Sales figures based on certification alone.
