= 2001 (Tokio Hotel album) =

Studio album by Tokio Hotel
- Released: 18 November 2022
- Recorded: 2019–22
- Genres: Electropop; pop rock; synth-pop
- Languages: English; German
- Labels: Sony Music; Epic
- Producers: Bill Kaulitz; Tom Kaulitz

Tokio Hotel chronology
Dream Machine (2017)	2001 (2022)	Encore (2026)

Singles from 2001
- 1. "Durch den Monsun 2020" Released: 2 October 2020; 2. "Berlin" Released: 11 December 2020; 3. "White Lies" Released: 15 January 2021; 4. "Here Comes the Night" Released: 22 October 2021; 5. "Bad Love" Released: 4 February 2022; 6. "Him" Released: 8 April 2022; 7. "When We Were Younger" Released: 27 May 2022; 8. "Happy People" Released: 21 October 2022

2001 is the seventh studio album by German band Tokio Hotel. It was released worldwide on 18 November 2022. The album's name, the cover and the tracklist were revealed through YouTube Premium live on 19 July 2022. 2001 is the band's first studio album in five years, following Dream Machine (2017), marking the longest gap between two Tokio Hotel studio albums.

== Background ==
Front singer Bill Kaulitz recalled in a statement that the lockdown gave the band time to be creative with each other again: "For the first time in a long time, it felt a bit like it did back then, more than 20 years ago," says Kaulitz about the recording sessions.

This also explains the title of the new long player: "2001" is a reference to the year in which the band met and founded for the first time. According to Kaulitz "On the one hand, the album goes back to the roots but it also combines all the Tokio Hotel facets of the last two decades,"

== Title and artwork ==
The album title, 2001, is a reference to the year the band first met.

== Promotion ==
Prior to the album's announcement, the band released the singles "Melancholic Paradise", "When It Rains It Pours" and "Chateau" in 2019, which despite not being included on the album served as promotional singles for a seventh album. A fourth single, "Berlin", along with the three aforementioned singles, was performed during Melancholic Paradise Tour 2019 prior to the song's release in 2020.

== Critical reception ==
Critical response to the album was mixed. Take To News criticized the album stating "It seems a bit as if Tokio Hotel had given up." Frontstage Magazine however praised the album, calling it "Super danceable and super haunting".

== Track listing ==
All tracks are produced by Tom Kaulitz, except where noted.

No.	Title	Writer(s)	Producer(s)	Length
1.	"Durch den Monsun 2020"	Peter Hoffman; David Jost; Dave Roth; Patrick Benzner; Bill Kaulitz; Tom Kaulitz		3:55
2.	"Him"	Antonina Armato; Tim James; B. Kaulitz; T. Kaulitz	Rock Mafia; Steve Hammons	3:35
3.	"White Lies" (VIZE x Tokio Hotel)	B. Kaulitz; T. Kaulitz; Vitali Zestovskih; Mark Becker; Leonie Burger; Claudio Marselli	T. Kaulitz; Zestovskih; Becker	3:04
4.	"Ain't Happy"	B. Kaulitz; T. Kaulitz		3:27
5.	"Just a Moment" (featuring VVAVES)	B. Kaulitz; T. Kaulitz; Emma Sophia Rosen		3:03
6.	"Hungover You"	B. Kaulitz; T. Kaulitz		3:33
7.	"Smells Like Summer" (featuring Ásdís)	Alexander Zuckowski; B. Kaulitz; T. Kaulitz; Daniel Flamm; Ásdís María Víðarsdóttir		3:04
8.	"Happy People" (featuring Daði Freyr)	Robin Grubert; B. Kaulitz; T. Kaulitz; Joe Walter; Pascal Kalli Reinhardt; Daði Freyr; Víðarsdóttir	T. Kaulitz; Reinhardt	3:00
9.	"Here Comes the Night"	T. Kaulitz; B. Kaulitz; Sophie Alexandra Tweed-Simmons		3:05
10.	"Dreamer"	B. Kaulitz; T. Kaulitz; Víðarsdóttir		3:16
11.	"Runaway"	B. Kaulitz; T. Kaulitz		3:31
12.	"When We Were Younger"	B. Kaulitz; T. Kaulitz; Tobias Kuhn	Henrik Menzel; T. Kaulitz; Kuhn; Peter Jem Seifert	2:40
13.	"Bad Love"	B. Kaulitz; T. Kaulitz; Zestovskih; Becker; Rosen; Burger	T. Kaulitz; Zestovskih; Becker	2:53
14.	"Another Lover"	B. Kaulitz; T. Kaulitz; Rosen		3:58
15.	"Berlin" (featuring VVAVES)	B. Kaulitz; T. Kaulitz; Rosen		3:25
16.	"Back to the Ocean"	B. Kaulitz; T. Kaulitz		3:49
Total length:				52:45

== Personnel ==
Tokio Hotel

- Bill Kaulitz – lead vocals
- Tom Kaulitz – guitars, keyboards, backing vocals
- Georg Listing – bass, backing vocals
- Gustav Schäfer – drums

Additional personnel

- Vimalavong
- VitaliZe
- VVAVES
- ÁSDÍS
- Daði Freyr

== Charts ==
Chart (2022)	Peak position
Austrian Albums (Ö3 Austria)	45
Belgian Albums (Ultratop Flanders)	153
Belgian Albums (Ultratop Wallonia)	63
German Albums (Offizielle Top 100)	10
Swiss Albums (Schweizer Hitparade)	43
