= Schrei =

2005 debut studio album by Tokio Hotel

Studio album by Tokio Hotel
- Released: 19 September 2005
- Recorded: 2004–2005
- Genres: Pop rock; pop-punk; alternative rock
- Length: 41:50
- Language: German
- Label: Universal Germany
- Producers: Patrick Benzner; Dave Roth; Peter Hoffmann; David Jost

Tokio Hotel chronology
Schrei (2005)	Zimmer 483 (2007)

Singles from Schrei
- 1. "Durch den Monsun" Released: 15 August 2005; 2. "Schrei" Released: 25 November 2005; 3. "Rette mich" Released: 10 March 2006; 4. "Der letzte Tag" Released: 28 August 2006

Schrei (so laut du kannst)

Studio album by Tokio Hotel
- Released: 1 January 2006
- Genres: Pop rock; pop-punk; alternative rock
- Length: 52:00
- Language: German
- Label: Universal Germany
- Producers: Patrick Benzner; Dave Roth; Peter Hoffmann; David Jost

Schrei ("Scream") is the debut studio album by German pop rock band Tokio Hotel. In 2006 they released a partly re-recorded and expanded version, Schrei (so laut du kannst) ("Scream (as loud as you can)"). The album was only released in Germany, Italy, France, Canada, and Japan. The initial limited edition came with a bonus DVD including the music video for "Durch den Monsun", a special "making of 'Durch den Monsun'" feature, an interview, and a photo gallery.

Because vocalist Bill Kaulitz's voice changed with puberty, the band re-recorded the songs "Schrei", "Rette mich", and "Der Letzte Tag". The version of Schrei (so laut du kannst) that is sold in Germany only has the re-recorded version of "Rette mich", while the version sold in France has the re-recorded versions of "Schrei", "Rette mich", "Der Letzte Tag", and acoustic versions of "Schrei" and of "Durch den Monsun."

Schrei has sold more than 1,500,000 copies worldwide while Schrei (so laut du kannst) has sold 100,000 copies worldwide.

== Track listing ==
All tracks are produced by Patrick Benzner, Dave Roth, Peter Hoffmann and David Jost.

Schrei
No.	Title	Writer(s)	Length
1.	"Schrei"	Dave Roth; David Jost	3:17
2.	"Durch den Monsun"	Bill Kaulitz; Roth; Benzner; Jost; Hoffmann	3:56
3.	"Leb die Sekunde"	B. Kaulitz; Roth; Benzner; Jost	3:45
4.	"Rette mich"	Roth; Benzner; Jost	3:42
5.	"Freunde bleiben"	Roth; Benzner; Jost	3:42
6.	"Ich bin nich' ich"	Roth; Jost; B. Kaulitz	3:48
7.	"Wenn nichts mehr geht"	B. Kaulitz; Roth; Benzner; Jost	3:53
8.	"Laß uns hier raus"	Roth; Benzner; Jost; Tokio Hotel	3:06
9.	"Gegen meinen Willen"	Tokio Hotel; Roth; Benzner; Jost	3:36
10.	"Jung und nicht mehr jugendfrei"	Tokio Hotel; Roth; Jost	3:22
11.	"Der letzte Tag"	Roth; Benzner; Jost; B. Kaulitz	3:04
12.	"Unendlichkeit"	Tokio Hotel	2:29
13.	"Monsun o Koete (Grizzly Mix)" (Japanese bonus track)	B. Kaulitz; Roth; Benzner; Jost; Hoffmann	4:07
Total length:			41:50

Schrei (so laut du kannst)
No.	Title	Writer(s)	Length
1.	"Schrei"	Roth; Jost	3:17
2.	"Durch den Monsun"	B. Kaulitz; Roth; Benzner; Jost; Hoffmann	3:56
3.	"Leb die Sekunde"	B. Kaulitz; Roth; Benzner; Jost	3:45
4.	"Rette mich" (Video version)	Roth; Benzner; Jost	3:42
5.	"Freunde bleiben"	Roth; Benzner; Jost	3:42
6.	"Ich bin nich' ich"	Roth; Jost; B. Kaulitz	3:48
7.	"Wenn nichts mehr geht"	B. Kaulitz; Roth; Benzner; Jost	3:53
8.	"Laß uns hier raus"	Roth; Benzner; Jost; Tokio Hotel	3:06
9.	"Gegen meinen Willen"	Tokio Hotel; Roth; Benzner; Jost	3:36
10.	"Jung und nicht mehr jugendfrei"	Tokio Hotel; Roth; Jost	3:22
11.	"Der letzte Tag"	Roth; Benzner; Jost; B. Kaulitz	3:04
12.	"Unendlichkeit"	Tokio Hotel	2:29
13.	"Beichte"	Roth; Jost; Benzner	3:33
14.	"Schwarz"	Roth; Jost; Benzner; Hoffmann; Tom Kaulitz	3:20
15.	"Thema nr. 1 - demo 2003"	Jost; Tokio Hotel	3:13
16.	"Schrei (Acoustic)" (France bonus track)	Roth; Jost	3:19
17.	"Durch den Monsun (Acoustic)" (France bonus track)	B. Kaulitz; Roth; Benzner; Jost; Hoffmann	3:59
Total length:			52:00

== Limited Edition Bonus DVD ==
1. Tokio Hotel feature
2. Tokio Hotel Interview
3. Videoclip "Durch den Monsun"
4. Making of "Durch den Monsun"
5. Tokio Hotel gallery

== Release history ==
Country	Date	Version
Germany	19 September 2005	Original
France	11 November 2005	Original
Germany	24 March 2006	Reissue
Japan	24 May 2006	Original
France	11 September 2006	Reissue
Italy	5 October 2006	Reissue
Canada	25 March 2008	Original

== Charts ==
=== Weekly charts ===
Chart (2005–07)	Peak position
Austrian Albums (Ö3 Austria)	1
Belgian Albums (Ultratop Flanders)	28
Belgian Albums (Ultratop Wallonia)	42
Dutch Albums (Album Top 100)	70
Finnish Albums (Suomen virallinen lista)	36
French Albums (SNEP)	12
German Albums (Offizielle Top 100)	1
Hungarian Albums (MAHASZ)	4
Italian Albums (FIMI)	66
Spanish Albums (Promusicae)	78
Swiss Albums (Schweizer Hitparade)	3

=== Year-end charts ===
Chart (2005)	Position
Austrian Albums (Ö3 Austria)	10
German Albums (Offizielle Top 100)	18
Swiss Albums (Schweizer Hitparade)	71

Chart (2006)	Position
Austrian Albums (Ö3 Austria)	8
German Albums (Offizielle Top 100)	6
Swiss Albums (Schweizer Hitparade)	35

Schrei – so laut du kannst
Chart (2006)	Position
French Albums (SNEP)	198
Chart (2007)	Position
French Albums (SNEP)	29

== Certifications ==
Region	Certification	Certified units/sales
Austria (IFPI Austria)	2× Platinum	60,000^{*}
France (SNEP)	Platinum	200,000^{*}
Germany (BVMI)	3× Gold	300,000^{^}
Hungary (MAHASZ)	Gold	5,000^{^}
Poland (ZPAV)	Platinum	20,000^{*}
Romania	Gold	
Russia (NFPF)	2× Platinum	40,000^{*}
Switzerland (IFPI Switzerland)	Gold	20,000^{^}
Summaries
Europe (IFPI)	Platinum	1,000,000^{*}
Worldwide	—	1,500,000
^{*} Sales figures based on certification alone.^{^} Shipments figures based on certification alone.

== Personnel ==
Performance credits

- Bill Kaulitz – lead vocals
- Tom Kaulitz – guitars, backing vocals
- Georg Listing – bass guitar, backing vocals
- Gustav Schäfer – drums, percussion

Technical credits

- Patrick Benzner – production, mixing
- Dave Roth – production, mixing
- David Jost – production
- Gateway – mastering
- Sascha Pierro – photography
- Olaf Heine – photography (deluxe edition)
- Dirk Rudolph – cover design

== See also ==
- List of certified albums in Romania
