= Automatisch =

2009 single by Tokio Hotel

Single by Tokio Hotel

from the album Humanoid
- B-side: "Humanoid"
- Released: 18 September 2009 (Germany)
- Genre: Pop rock
- Length: 3:15
- Label: Interscope, Cherrytree
- Songwriters: B. Kaulitz, T. Kaulitz, D. Roth, P. Benzner, D. Jost
- Producers: B. Kaulitz, T. Kaulitz, D. Roth, P. Benzner, D. Jost

"Automatic"

Single by Tokio Hotel

from the album Humanoid
- Released: 22 September 2009 (United States)
- Genre: Pop rock
- Length: 3:15
- Label: Universal
- Songwriters: B. Kaulitz, T. Kaulitz, D. Roth, P. Benzner, D. Jost
- Producers: David Roth, Patrick Benzner, David Jost

Tokio Hotel singles chronology
"Heilig" (2008)	"Automatisch" / "Automatic" (2009)	""World Behind My Wall/Lass Uns Laufen"" (2010)

"Automatisch" and "Automatic" are the first singles from German pop rock band Tokio Hotel's third German-language studio album and second English-language studio album, Humanoid. "Automatisch" was released in German-speaking countries on 18 September 2009 and "Automatic" was released in the United States on 22 September 2009.

== Music video ==
Craig Wessels of Wicked Pixels, the most-awarded animation-studio in South Africa, directed the music video, shot over three days in the Kalahari Desert in South Africa. The video features the band driving separately in muscle cars and with computer generated humanoid robots. The music video for "Automatic" was released online on September 3, 2009, while the video for "Automatisch" was released a day later.

== Formats and track listings ==
- Automatisch CD-Single: 2 Track

#	Title	Songwriters	Length
1	"Automatisch"	B. Kaulitz, T. Kaulitz, D. Roth, P. Benzner, D. Jost	3:16
2	"Automatic"	B. Kaulitz, T. Kaulitz, D. Roth, P. Benzner, D. Jost	3:16

- Automatisch CD-Single: Premium

#	Title	Songwriters	Length
1	"Automatisch"	B. Kaulitz, T. Kaulitz, D. Roth, P. Benzner, D. Jost	3:16
2	"Humanoid"	B. Kaulitz, T. Kaulitz, D. Roth, P. Benzner, D. Jost	3:45

- Bonus Tokio Hotel fan magnet

- Automatic CD-Single

#	Title	Songwriters	Length
1	"Automatic"	T. Kaulitz, B. Kaulitz, D. Roth, P. Benzner, D. Jost	3:16
2	"Automatisch"	B. Kaulitz, T. Kaulitz, D. Roth, P. Benzner, D. Jost	3:16

- Automatic Australian iTunes Download

#	Title	Songwriters	Length
1	"Automatic"	B. Kaulitz, T. Kaulitz, D. Roth, P. Benzner, D. Jost	3:15
2	"Automatisch"	B. Kaulitz, T. Kaulitz, D. Roth, P. Benzner, D. Jost	3:15
3	"Humanoid (English Version)"	B. Kaulitz, T. Kaulitz, D. Roth, P. Benzner, D. Jost	3:48
4	"Automatic (Remote Control Mix)"	B. Kaulitz, T. Kaulitz, D. Roth, P. Benzner, D. Jost	3:17

== Charts ==
Chart (2009)	Peak position
Austrian Singles Chart	14
Belgian Singles Chart (Flanders)	23
Belgian Singles Chart (Wallonia)	16
Dutch Singles Chart	75
French Singles Chart	2
German Singles Chart	5
Hungarian Singles Chart	10
South Africa 5FM Charts	11
Spanish Singles Chart	21
Swedish Singles Chart	36
Swiss Singles Chart	44
