= Lass uns laufen =

"Lass Uns Laufen" "World Behind My Wall"

Single by Tokio Hotel

from the album Humanoid
- Released: 8 January 2010
- Genre: Pop rock; rock ballad; alternative rock
- Length: 4:15
- Label: Universal
- Songwriters: B. Kaulitz, T. Kaulitz, D. Roth, P. Benzner, D. Jost, Guy Chambers
- Producers: David Roth, Patrick Benzner, David Jost

Tokio Hotel singles chronology
"Automatisch"/ "Automatic" (2009)	"Lass Uns Laufen"/ "World Behind My Wall" (2010)	"Hurricanes and Suns" / "Mädchen aus dem All" (2010)

"Lass Uns Laufen" (English: "Let's Run") and "World Behind My Wall" are the second singles from German pop rock band Tokio Hotel's third German studio album and second English studio album Humanoid. "World Behind My Wall" was released in the United States on 8 January 2010 and "Lass Uns Laufen" was released in German-speaking countries on 22 January 2010.

== Track listing ==
No.	Title	Writer(s)	Length
1.	"World Behind My Wall"	Bill Kaulitz, Dave Roth, Pat Benzner, David Jost, Guy Chambers	4:15
2.	"Lass Uns Laufen"	Bill Kaulitz, Dave Roth, Pat Benzner, David Jost, Guy Chambers	4:15
3.	"World Behind My Wall [Acoustic]"	Bill Kaulitz, Dave Roth, Pat Benzner, David Jost, Guy Chambers	4:07
4.	"World Behind My Wall [Emma's Park remix]"	Bill Kaulitz, Dave Roth, Pat Benzner, David Jost, Guy Chambers	4:12

+ World Behind My Wall (Music Video)

== Release history ==
Country	Release date	Version
United States	8 January 2010	English
Germany	22 January 2010	German

== Charts ==
Chart (2010)	Peak position
Belgium (Ultratip Bubbling Under Flanders)	18
France (SNEP)	13
