= Humanoid (Tokio Hotel album) =

Studio album by Tokio Hotel
- Released: 2 October 2009 (Germany); 6 October 2009 (USA)
- Length: 45:12 (standard edition); 58:38 (deluxe edition)
- Languages: German; English
- Labels: Cherrytree; Island
- Producers: Bill Kaulitz; Tom Kaulitz

Tokio Hotel chronology
Scream (2007)	Humanoid (2009)	Humanoid City Live (2010)

Singles from Humanoid (German version)
- 1. "Automatisch" Released: 18 September 2009; 2. "Lass Uns Laufen" Released: 22 January 2010

Singles from Humanoid (English version)
- 1. "Automatic" Released: 22 September 2009; 2. "World Behind My Wall" Released: 8 January 2010

The Humanoid refers to the third German-language studio album, the second English-language studio album, and the fourth overall studio album by the German band Tokio Hotel. Released through Island Records and Cherrytree Records, the album was recorded in both German and English, with both versions set for a simultaneous worldwide release bearing the same title.

The German version of the album was released on 2 October 2009, in Germany and other European countries, while the English version was released in the United States on 6 October 2009. Unlike their previous English-language album, Scream, Humanoid had no UK release in 2009. Humanoid was digitally released on UK iTunes on 27 January 2014.

The song "Human Connect To Human" was featured in a Verizon Wireless commercial promoting Motorola's Droid phone. "Humanoid" is included on the set list for rhythm game Rock Band 3.

== Background ==
After the North American mini-tours in 2008, the band returned to their studio in Hamburg to record the album. Tokio Hotel founders and identical twin brothers Tom and Bill Kaulitz produced the majority of the album. Others helped produce various songs including the Matrix, Guy Chambers and Desmond Child (who worked on an album with the same theme for Scorpions). In total, 25 songs were recorded for the album with originally 13 making the final track listing. But when the track listing for both versions were released, it was found that 12 tracks would be on the standard versions while 16 tracks would be on the deluxe versions.

The album title, Humanoid, is a word derived from science fiction which means 'human like'. Producer David Jost had explained the reasoning behind the album title to an interview with MTV:

"This word is pronounced differently in the English and German language but is written the same way in both languages. Bill wanted the new record to have only one name worldwide: Humanoid."

On 17 June 2009, short versions of two of the new English songs, "Dark Side of the Sun" and "Pain of Love", were leaked on the Internet. It was confirmed to be from Tokio Hotel and it would be on the album. On that same day, after the confirmation, every possible video on YouTube containing these two demos had been taken down due to copyright restrictions. Later, in August, three full version songs were leaked, "Love & Death", "Pain of Love" and "Dark Side of the Sun". The songs were then also removed from any media site that the songs were put up on, but now the songs can be found on YouTube or on fan blogs.

On 21 July 2009, Nokia.de told the public that they had signed a deal with Tokio Hotel to become the new face of Nokia. In return, Tokio Hotel got a poster campaign and an unplugged performance which was held on 27 August in Cologne, Germany and tickets were available through a contest. The mini-concert consisted of 6 songs: 5 known hits and the premier of the first single taken from the album, "Automatisch".

On 9 August, it was announced that the first single from the album would be "Automatisch" in German and "Automatic" in English. On 20 August, MTV Buzzworthy released a video which previewed "Automatic" and Cherrytree Records announced that the English version of the song would be released in the US on 22 September. The video for the single(s) was released on 3 September. Upon the album's artwork being unveiled, MTV News likened its cover to the alternate artwork of Janet Jackson's "Feedback."

On 5 November, the band performed the song "World Behind My Wall" at the 2009 MTV Europe Music Awards. This is the second single from the album, along with "Lass Uns Laufen".

The Music Video for "Dark Side Of The Sun" was released on their website on 24 June 2010. This is said to be the third single from the album, but there is currently no German version (Sonnensystem) available. The music video is a collaboration of concert videos, clips and footage with, for the first time in all of Tokio Hotel's singles, audio being taken from an actual live performance instead of a studio take.

== Reception ==
Professional ratings
Aggregate scores
Source	Rating
Metacritic	57/100
Review scores
Source	Rating
AllMusic	3/5 stars
Billboard	3.5/5 stars
Entertainment Weekly	C
Rolling Stone	2/5 stars

Critical response to Humanoid was mixed. At Metacritic, which assigns a normalized rating out of 100 to reviews from mainstream critics, the album has received an average score of 57, based on four reviews.

== Track listing ==
=== German version ===
Humanoid – Standard edition
No.	Title	Writer(s)	Producer(s)	Length
1.	"Komm"	Dave Roth; Patrick Benzner; David Jost; Bill Kaulitz; Tom Kaulitz	Benzner; Roth; Jost; Peter Hoffmann; B. Kaulitz (co.); T. Kaulitz (co.); Kristian Nord (add.)	3:53
2.	"Sonnensystem"	Roth; Benzner; Jost; B. Kaulitz; T. Kaulitz	Benzner; Roth; Jost; Hoffmann; B. Kaulitz (co.); T. Kaulitz (co.); Nord (add.)	3:52
3.	"Automatisch"	Roth; Benzner; Jost; B. Kaulitz; T. Kaulitz	Benzner; Roth; Jost; Hoffmann; B. Kaulitz (co.); T. Kaulitz (co.); Nord (add.)	3:16
4.	"Lass uns laufen"	Roth; Benzner; Jost; Guy Chambers; B. Kaulitz; T. Kaulitz	Benzner; Roth; Jost; Hoffmann; B. Kaulitz (co.); T. Kaulitz (co.); Nord (add.)	4:15
5.	"Humanoid"	Roth; Benzner; Jost; B. Kaulitz; T. Kaulitz	Benzner; Roth; Jost; Hoffmann; B. Kaulitz (co.); T. Kaulitz (co.); Nord (add.)	3:45
6.	"Für immer jetzt"	Roth; Benzner; Jost; B. Kaulitz; T. Kaulitz	Benzner; Roth; Jost; Hoffmann; B. Kaulitz (co.); T. Kaulitz (co.); Nord (add.)	3:37
7.	"Kampf der Liebe"	Roth; Benzner; Jost; Chambers; B. Kaulitz; T. Kaulitz	Benzner; Roth; Jost; Hoffmann; B. Kaulitz (co.); T. Kaulitz (co.); Nord (add.)	3:51
8.	"Hunde"	Martin Kierszenbaum; Roth; Benzner; Jost; B. Kaulitz; T. Kaulitz; Nord	Benzner; Roth; Jost; Hoffmann; B. Kaulitz (co.); T. Kaulitz (co.); Nord (add.)	3:41
9.	"Menschen suchen Menschen"	Roth; Benzner; Jost; the Matrix; B. Kaulitz; T. Kaulitz	The Matrix; Benzner; Roth; Jost; Hoffmann; Nord (add.)	3:45
10.	"Alien"	Roth; Benzner; Jost; B. Kaulitz; T. Kaulitz	Benzner; Roth; Jost; Hoffmann; B. Kaulitz (co.); T. Kaulitz (co.); Nord (add.)	2:55
11.	"Geisterfahrer" (featuring Jana Pallaske)	Roth; Benzner; Jost; B. Kaulitz; T. Kaulitz	Benzner; Roth; Jost; Hoffmann; B. Kaulitz (co.); T. Kaulitz (co.); Nord (add.)	4:29
12.	"Zoom"	Desmond Child; Benzner; Roth; Jost; B. Kaulitz; T. Kaulitz	Benzner; Roth; Jost; Hoffmann; B. Kaulitz (co.); T. Kaulitz (co.); Nord (add.)	3:52
Total length:				45:12

Humanoid – Deluxe Edition
No.	Title	Writer(s)	Producer(s)	Length
13.	"Träumer"	Roth; Benzner; Jost; the Matrix; B. Kaulitz; T. Kaulitz	The Matrix; Benzner; Roth; Jost; Hoffmann; Nord (add.)	3:02
14.	"Hey Du"	Roth; Benzner; Jost; the Matrix; B. Kaulitz; T. Kaulitz	The Matrix; Benzner; Roth; Jost; Hoffmann; Nord (add.)	3:02
15.	"That Day"	Roth; Benzner; Jost; the Matrix; B. Kaulitz; T. Kaulitz	The Matrix; Benzner; Roth; Jost; Hoffmann; Nord (add.)	3:27
16.	"Screamin'"	Roth; Benzner; Jost; the Matrix; B. Kaulitz; T. Kaulitz	The Matrix; Benzner; Roth; Jost; Hoffmann; Nord (add.)	3:56
Total length:				58:38

=== English version ===
Humanoid – Standard edition
No.	Title	Writer(s)	Producer(s)	Length
1.	"Noise"	Dave Roth; Patrick Benzner; David Jost; Bill Kaulitz; Tom Kaulitz	Benzner; Roth; Jost; Peter Hoffmann; B. Kaulitz (co.); T. Kaulitz (co.); Kristian Nord (add.)	3:53
2.	"Darkside of the Sun"	Roth; Benzner; Jost; B. Kaulitz; T. Kaulitz	Benzner; Roth; Jost; Hoffmann; B. Kaulitz (co.); T. Kaulitz (co.); Nord (add.)	3:52
3.	"Automatic"	Roth; Benzner; Jost; B. Kaulitz; T. Kaulitz	Benzner; Roth; Jost; Hoffmann; B. Kaulitz (co.); T. Kaulitz (co.); Nord (add.)	3:16
4.	"World Behind My Wall"	Roth; Benzner; Jost; Guy Chambers; B. Kaulitz; T. Kaulitz	Benzner; Roth; Jost; Hoffmann; B. Kaulitz (co.); T. Kaulitz (co.); Nord (add.)	4:15
5.	"Humanoid"	Roth; Benzner; Jost; B. Kaulitz; T. Kaulitz	Benzner; Roth; Jost; Hoffmann; B. Kaulitz (co.); T. Kaulitz (co.); Nord (add.)	3:45
6.	"Forever Now"	Roth; Benzner; Jost; B. Kaulitz; T. Kaulitz	Benzner; Roth; Jost; Hoffmann; B. Kaulitz (co.); T. Kaulitz (co.); Nord (add.)	3:37
7.	"Pain of Love"	Roth; Benzner; Jost; Chambers; B. Kaulitz; T. Kaulitz	Benzner; Roth; Jost; Hoffmann; B. Kaulitz (co.); T. Kaulitz (co.); Nord (add.)	3:51
8.	"Dogs Unleashed"	Martin Kierszenbaum; Roth; Benzner; Jost; B. Kaulitz; T. Kaulitz; Nord	Benzner; Roth; Jost; Hoffmann; B. Kaulitz (co.); T. Kaulitz (co.); Nord (add.)	3:41
9.	"Human Connect to Human"	Roth; Benzner; Jost; The Matrix; B. Kaulitz; T. Kaulitz	The Matrix; Benzner; Roth; Jost; Hoffmann; Nord (add.)	3:45
10.	"Hey You"	Roth; Benzner; Jost; The Matrix; B. Kaulitz; T. Kaulitz	The Matrix; Benzner; Roth; Jost; Hoffmann; Nord (add.)	3:02
11.	"Love & Death"	Roth; Benzner; Jost; The Matrix; B. Kaulitz; T. Kaulitz	The Matrix; Benzner; Roth; Jost; Hoffmann; Nord (add.)	3:02
12.	"Zoom Into Me"	Desmond Child; Benzner; Roth; Jost; B. Kaulitz; T. Kaulitz	Benzner; Roth; Jost; Hoffmann; B. Kaulitz (co.); T. Kaulitz (co.); Nord (add.)	3:52
Total length:				45:12

Humanoid – Deluxe Edition
No.	Title	Writer(s)	Producer(s)	Length
13.	"Phantomrider"	Roth; Benzner; Jost; B. Kaulitz; T. Kaulitz	Benzner; Roth; Jost; Hoffmann; B. Kaulitz (co.); T. Kaulitz (co.); Nord (add.)	4:29
14.	"That Day"	Roth; Benzner; Jost; The Matrix; B. Kaulitz; T. Kaulitz	The Matrix; Benzner; Roth; Jost; Hoffmann; Nord (add.)	3:27
15.	"Alien"	Roth; Benzner; Jost; B. Kaulitz; T. Kaulitz	Benzner; Roth; Jost; Hoffmann; B. Kaulitz (co.); T. Kaulitz (co.); Nord (add.)	2:55
16.	"Screamin'"	Roth; Benzner; Jost; The Matrix; Jonathan Davis; B. Kaulitz; T. Kaulitz	The Matrix; Benzner; Roth; Jost; Hoffmann; Nord (add.)	3:56
Total length:				58:38

Humanoid – US iTunes Deluxe Edition
No.	Title	Writer(s)	Producer(s)	Length
17.	"Attention"	Roth; Benzner; Jost; The Matrix; B. Kaulitz; T. Kaulitz	The Matrix; Benzner; Roth; Jost; Hoffmann; Nord (add.)	3:00
18.	"Down on You"	Roth; Benzner; Jost; The Matrix; B. Kaulitz; T. Kaulitz	The Matrix; Benzner; Roth; Jost; Hoffmann; Nord (add.)	3:03
19.	"In Your Shadow (I Can Shine)"	Child; Benzner; Roth; Jost; B. Kaulitz; T. Kaulitz	Benzner; Roth; Jost; Hoffmann; B. Kaulitz (co.); T. Kaulitz (co.); Nord (add.)	3:00

== Personnel ==
Performance credits

- Bill Kaulitz – lead vocals
- Tom Kaulitz – guitar, piano, backing vocals
- Georg Listing – bass guitar, keyboards, backing vocals
- Gustav Schäfer – drums, percussion, backing vocals
- Strings on "Sonnensystem"
  - Violin and viola – Stefan Pintev, Rodrigo Reichel, Dana Matchin
  - Cello – Boris Matchin

Production

- Executive Producers: Patrick Benzner, Dave Roth, David Jost, Peter Hoffman
- Co-producers: Bill Kaulitz and Tom Kaulitz
- Management: David Jost and Benjamin Ebel

== Release history ==
Country	Release date
Germany	2 October 2009
United States	6 October 2009
United Kingdom	27 January 2014

== Charts ==
=== Weekly charts ===
Weekly chart performance for Humanoid
Chart (2009–10)	Peak position
Argentine Albums (CAPIF)	19
Austrian Albums (Ö3 Austria)	8
Belgian Albums (Ultratop Flanders)	6
Belgian Albums (Ultratop Wallonia)	8
Canadian Albums (Billboard)	20
Czech Albums (ČNS IFPI)	8
Danish Albums (Hitlisten)	26
Dutch Albums (Album Top 100)	6
European Albums (Billboard)	2
Finnish Albums (Suomen virallinen lista)	9
French Albums (SNEP)	3
German Albums (Offizielle Top 100)	1
Greek Albums (IFPI)	38
Hungarian Albums (MAHASZ)	33
Italian Albums (FIMI)	2
Mexican Albums (Top 100 Mexico)	7
New Zealand Albums (Recorded Music NZ)	38
Norwegian Albums (VG-lista)	16
Polish Albums (ZPAV)	42
Portuguese Albums (AFP)	2
Russian Albums (2M)	9
Slovenian Albums (IFPI)	9
Spanish Albums (Promusicae)	2
Swedish Albums (Sverigetopplistan)	8
Swiss Albums (Schweizer Hitparade)	10
US Billboard 200	35
US Top Album Sales (Billboard)	35
US Top Alternative Albums (Billboard)	11
US Top Rock Albums (Billboard)	16

== Certifications ==
Certifications and sales for Humanoid
Region	Certification	Certified units/sales
France (SNEP)	Gold	50,000^{*}
Italy (FIMI) English version	Gold	35,000^{*}
Portugal (AFP)	Gold	10,000^{^}
Spain (Promusicae)	Gold	30,000^{^}
^{*} Sales figures based on certification alone.^{^} Shipments figures based on certification alone.
