= Tokio Hotel =

German pop rock band

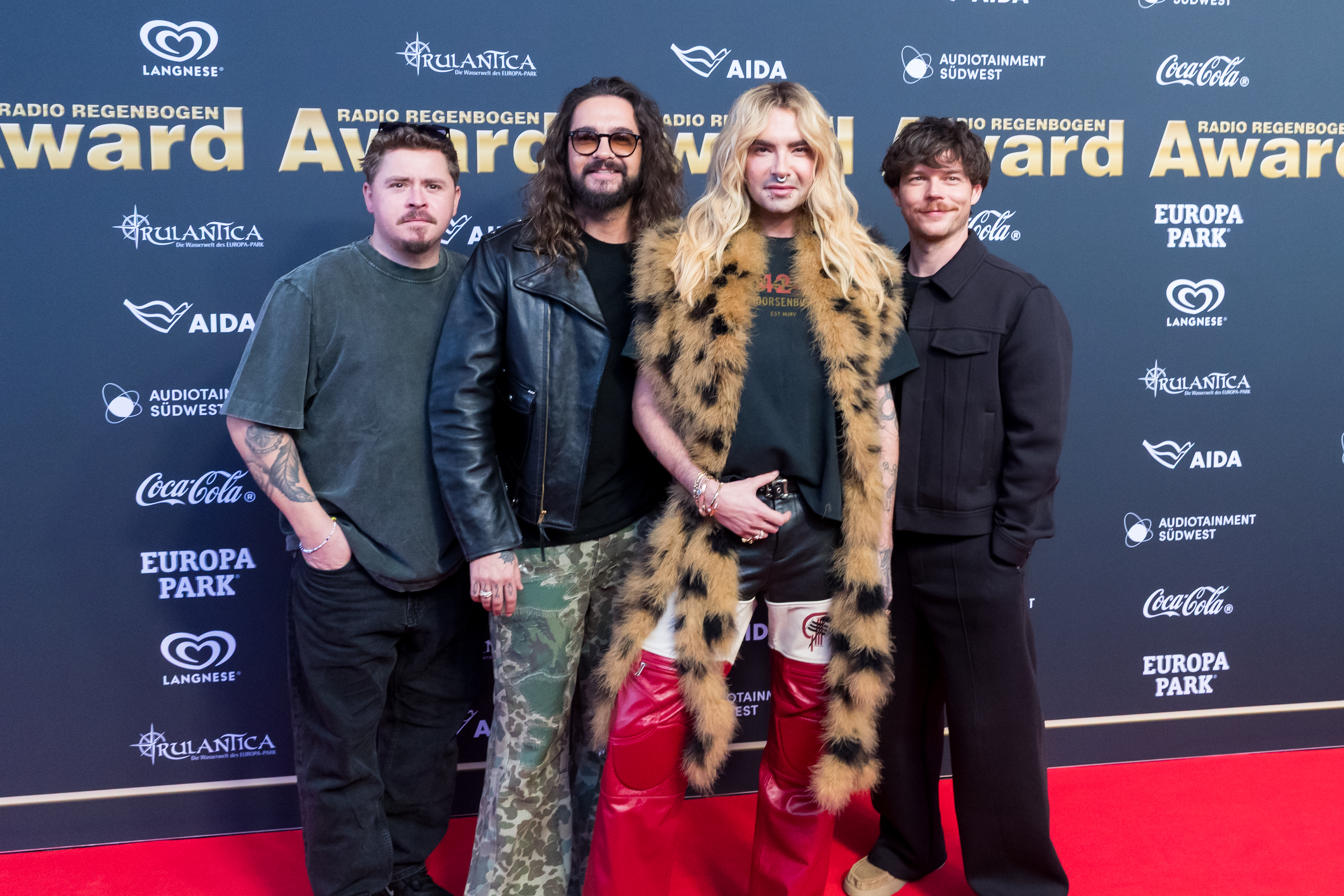
- Tokio Hotel in 2026. L–R: Gustav Schäfer, Tom Kaulitz, Bill Kaulitz, and Georg Listing

Background information
- Also known as: Devilish (2001–2003)
- Origin: Magdeburg, Germany
- Genres: Pop rock; alternative rock; pop-punk; post-grunge; electronic rock; electropop (since 2014); synth-pop (since 2014)
- Works: Tokio Hotel discography
- Years active: 2001–present
- Labels: Universal (2005–2016); Polydor (2014–2016); De-Code Ltd. (2014–2017); Starwatch (2017–2020); Sony (2003–2005; 2020–2022); Epic (2020–2022); Tokio Hotel (2022–present)
- Members: Bill Kaulitz; Tom Kaulitz; Georg Listing; Gustav Schäfer
- Website: tokiohotel.com

Tokio Hotel is a German rock band formed in 2001 by singer Bill Kaulitz, guitarist Tom Kaulitz, bassist Georg Listing, and drummer Gustav Schäfer. Starting from the foundation, the band's music genres were pop rock and alternative rock; since 2014, the band began to perform electropop and synth-pop.

After recording a demo album under the name "Devilish" and having their contract with Sony BMG Germany terminated, the band released their first German-language album, Schrei, as Tokio Hotel on Universal Music Germany in 2005. Schrei sold more than half-a-million copies worldwide and spawned four top-five singles in both Germany and Austria. In 2007, the band released their second German-language album, Zimmer 483, and their first English-language album, Scream, which have combined album sales of over 2.5 million copies worldwide and helped win the band their first MTV Europe Music Award for Best InterAct. The former, Zimmer 483, spawned three top-five singles in Germany while the latter, Scream, spawned two singles that reached the top-twenty in new territories such as France, Portugal, Spain and Italy.

In September 2008, they won their first MTV Video Music Award, for Best New Artist. Tokio Hotel became the first German band ever to win an award at the MTV VMAs and to also win awards at the MTV Video Music Awards Latin America. They also picked up the Headliner award at the MTV Europe Music Awards 2008 and the award for Best Group at the MTV Europe Music Awards 2009. They won for Best World Stage Performance on 7 November 2010 at the MTV Europe Music Awards. In July 2011, they became the first German band to win an award at the MTV Video Music Awards Japan. The band has sold more than 10 million records worldwide.

Their most recent work is the 2026 album Encore.

== History ==
=== Formation, early years, and debut album (2001–2006) ===
At the age of 10, identical twin brothers Bill and Tom Kaulitz began performing live in Magdeburg near their hometown of Loitsche. They played small shows, and, while their audiences enjoyed them, they were largely unknown. The band lacked a drummer and bass player, and the twins relied on a keyboard to fill in other instrumental sounds.

The year the brothers turned 12, they met Georg Listing (then 14) and Gustav Schäfer (then 13) in the audience of one of their shows. Listing and Schäfer were friends and, after the show, having liked what they heard and saw, made an offer to join. The band was promptly renamed "Devilish" in 2001 due to an article published at the time that referred to their "devilishly great" sound.

The group continued to perform in talent shows and small concerts, but aside from being featured on a small-time German news program somewhere between late 2002 and early 2003, Devilish were not going anywhere until Bill auditioned on the reality TV talent show "Star Search." After Bill Kaulitz participated in a children's version of Star Search in 2003 at age thirteen (which he lost in the quarter-final), he was discovered by music producer Peter Hoffmann. Devilish changed their name to Tokio Hotel: "Tokio", the German spelling of the Japanese city Tokyo, due to a love of the city, and "Hotel" due to their constant touring and living in hotels. Soon after Sony BMG took them under contract, Hoffmann hired David Jost and Pat Benzner into the team of creators and authors, and had them give the teens instruction on songwriting and instrument playing; most of the songs of the first album were written by Hoffmann, Jost and Benzer (including the singles "Scream" and "Rescue me" which were completely written by them); only the single "Unendlichkeit" was written completely by Tokio Hotel themselves. Shortly before the release of their first album, Sony terminated their contract.

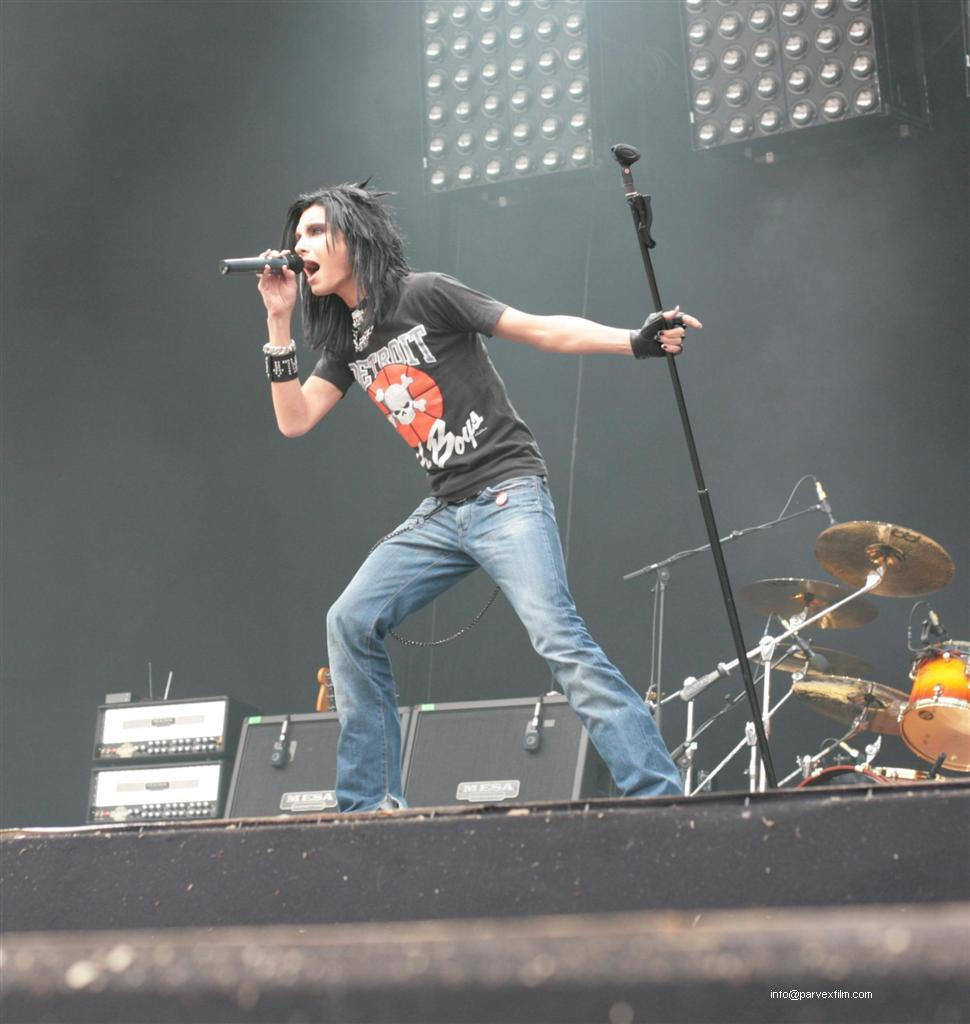
Bill Kaulitz performing in Hessisch-Lichtenau, Germany, in 2006

In 2005, Universal Music Group took Tokio Hotel under contract and developed a marketing plan. Their first single, "Durch den Monsun" ("Through the Monsoon"), quickly rose in the charts, appearing on the German official Media Control single chart at No. 15 on 20 August 2005 and eventually reaching No. 1 on 26 August 2005; it also reached No. 1 on the Austrian singles chart. Their second single, "Schrei" ("Scream"), climbed to the No. 5 position in the German charts. These two songs were written by singer Bill Kaulitz and their group of producers Peter Hoffmann, David Jost, Pat Benzer, and Dave Roth. Their debut album, Schrei, was released on 19 September 2005, and was certified triple gold by the BVMI in 2006 for selling over 300,000 copies in Germany. In 2006, a third and fourth single, "Rette mich" ("Rescue Me") and "Der letzte Tag" ("The Final Day"), were released; both reached No. 1 as well. "Der letzte Tag" contained a B-side called "Wir schließen uns ein", which was also accompanied by a music video.

=== Zimmer 483 and Scream (2006–2008) ===
The first single of their second album Zimmer 483 (Room 483), called "Übers Ende der Welt" (later re-released in English under the name "Ready, Set, Go!"), was released on 26 January 2007 and quickly reached No. 1 in Germany and Austria, and No. 2 in France. Zimmer 483 was released in Germany on 23 February 2007, along with a deluxe edition of the album containing a DVD. The album's second single, "Spring nicht" ("Don't Jump") was released on 7 April. The tour accompanying the release of the album, The Zimmer 483 Tour, scheduled to start in March 2007, was delayed by two weeks because the band members wished to have a different stage design. A third single, "An deiner Seite (Ich bin da)" ("By Your Side"), was released on 16 November. The single contains the B-side "1000 Meere" ("1000 Oceans"), for which a music video was also produced. On 28 April 2008 Tokio Hotel released their single "Heilig" but no music video for the single was released, because of the tight schedule they had.

Tokio Hotel's first English-language album, Scream, was released on 4 June 2007 throughout Europe. In Germany, the album was released as Room 483 in order to emphasize the continuity with their last German album Zimmer 483. Scream contains English versions of a selection of songs from Tokio Hotel's German-language albums Schrei and Zimmer 483. "Monsoon", the English-language version of "Durch den Monsun", was the first single from the album. "Ready, Set, Go!" (the translation of "Übers Ende der Welt") was released as the album's second single and "Don't Jump" (the translation of "Spring nicht") as the third single. A video for "Scream", the English-language version of their 2005 hit "Schrei", was also recorded, and was released to the iTunes Store in early March 2008.

Tokio Hotel gave their first concert in the United Kingdom on 19 June 2007. "Ready, Set, Go!" was released in the UK as the band's first single on 27 August 2007. The song reached No. 77 in the UK Singles Chart.

Tokio Hotel won an MTV Europe Music Award for Best InterAct on 1 November 2007 and were also nominated for Best Band. They performed "Monsoon" at the event.

Tokio Hotel released their first US single, simply called "Tokio Hotel", in late 2007. The single contains the tracks "Scream" and "Ready, Set, Go!", and was available exclusively at Hot Topic stores. Their second US single, "Scream America", was released on 11 December 2007. The single contains the track "Scream" and a remix of "Ready, Set, Go!" by AFI's Jade Puget. In February 2008, the band toured North America for five dates, starting in Canada and finishing up in New York. After Tokio Hotel had appeared and performed live on MuchMusic while touring in Canada, "Ready, Set, Go!" entered the MuchOnDemand Daily 10, a countdown of videos chosen by viewers. It remained there for over a week, then returned to the top of the MOD Daily 10 chart on 8 April. "Scream" was released in Canada on 25 March and in the US on 6 May.

The "1000 Hotels" European Tour began on 3 March 2008 in Brussels and continued through locations including the Netherlands, Luxembourg, France, Spain, Portugal, Italy, Serbia and Scandinavia. It was scheduled to finish on 9 April; during the concert in Marseille, France, on 14 March, Bill started to experience vocal problems. He let the audience sing more frequently than normal, and instead of the original 21 songs on the set list, the band played only 16 songs. Bill apologized, in German, for his bad singing and explained that he was sick. Two days later, the band cancelled the Lisbon, Portugal concert minutes before it was supposed to commence. The rest of the "1000 Hotels" Tour and a scheduled North American Tour were cancelled after the band's manager announced in Bild that Bill Kaulitz had to undergo surgery to remove a cyst on his vocal cords.

Bill Kaulitz had been putting strain on his voice after playing 43 concerts in the 1000 Hotels tour without a break. He had to undergo larynx surgery on 30 March to remove a cyst that had formed on his vocal cords. The cyst resulted from a throat infection that had gone untreated. Following his surgery Bill could not speak for ten days and had four weeks of vocal rehabilitation. If Bill had continued singing the rest of the tour, his voice would have eventually been permanently damaged. Tokio Hotel started performing again in May 2008 and after that they embarked on a second part of their 1000 Hotels European Tour, adding many open-air concerts and wrapping up the tour on 13 July in Werchter in Belgium.

=== Humanoid, Humanoid City Live, Best Of (2008–2012) ===
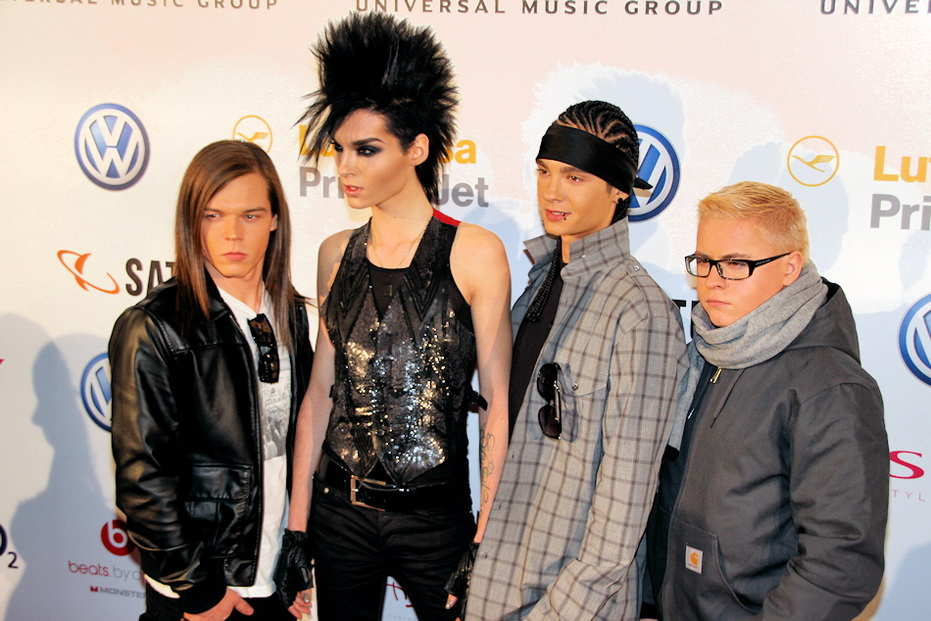
Tokio Hotel at the 2009 MTV Europe Music Awards in Berlin, Germany

In August 2008 Tokio Hotel embarked on a second tour of North America, including a performance at the Bamboozle festival in New Jersey. The band's music video for "Ready Set Go!" was nominated for Best Pop Video at the 2008 MTV Video Music Awards, where they won the award for Best New Artist. They returned to North America in October 2008 for a month-long tour of concerts and record-store signings. In December 2008 a behind-the-scenes DVD called Tokio Hotel TV – Caught on Camera was released. It contains footage from Tokio Hotel TV and backstage feature-stories of the previous year on disc one entitled "History – The very best of Tokio Hotel TV!". A deluxe edition contains a second disc entitled "Future – The road to the new Album!" which features footage of the band on promotion tours and preparing for their third studio album.

In between the North American tours, the band returned to their record studio in Hamburg to record their third studio album, Humanoid, which was released on 2 October in Germany and 6 October 2009 in the U.S., despite earlier statements predicting a March/April 2009 release or a May/June 2009 release. The album was recorded in both German and English, with both versions released simultaneously worldwide.

On 10 August, it was announced on MTV News that the first German single would be "Automatisch" and that its English counterpart, "Automatic", would be released as a first single in the United States. On 20 August, MTV Buzzworthy released a video which previewed "Automatic" and Cherrytree Records announced that the English version of the song would be released in the US on 22 September. Nevertheless, the video for the single was released on 3 September.

On 2 November 2009 Tom's blog announced that the second English single would be "World Behind My Wall" and that its German counterpart, "Lass uns laufen", would be the second German single. The music videos for both versions were released on 14 and 15 December.

The group toured thirty-two cities in Europe from 22 February to 14 April 2010. On 24 June 2010, the live music-video for their single, "Dark Side of the Sun", was released on the band website.

On 20 July 2010, they released their second live album, Humanoid City Live, from Milan, Italy. On 22 November 2010, their new song "Hurricanes and Suns" premiered on the Greek radio-station Mad Radio. It was included in the bonus track on all versions of Tokio Hotel: Best Of, a compilation album of their most successful songs.

On 13 December 2010 their Best of was released in Germany. It was released internationally the next day. 2 December was the World Premiere of the video for "Hurricanes and Suns" on the official Tokio Hotel website.

Tokio Hotel performed their first concert in Asia (excluding their concert in Israel) at the Audi Showcase in Singapore, followed shortly by the TM Connects With Tokio Hotel event in Malaysia, promoting the sales of their album Humanoid. They concluded the series of mini-concerts with Taiwan. They returned to Malaysia a couple of months later to perform at MTV World Stage Live in Malaysia 2010. They performed in Tokyo on 15 December 2010, after their South American tour concluded in Distrito Federal, Mexico on 2 December 2010. In February 2011 Tokio Hotel travelled to Japan to complete a second promo tour. A number of television appearances and media interviews took place between 8 and 11 February.

On 28 April 2011 they received the "Fan Army FTW" award at the MTV O Music Awards, the network's first online award-show. A clip of Bill and Tom thanking their fans played after the winner was announced.

On 24 June 2011 Tokio Hotel performed in Japan at "The Next Premium Night Tokio Hotel in Tokyo". Audi A1 presented the event, and 150 fans were chosen to win tickets to attend the show. The event was the band's first acoustic performance in Japan. On 25 June 2011 the band performed live at the MTV Video Music Aid Japan in Tokyo. The show, formerly called the "Video Music Awards Japan", was used as a music benefit to raise money for the Japanese Red Cross in order to help those affected by the 2011 earthquake.

Not long after finishing the "Welcome to Humanoid City Tour", Bill and Tom, with their manager David Jost, moved to Los Angeles and continue to live there.

On 18 May 2012 Far East Movement released an album named "Dirty Bass", featuring the song "If I Die Tomorrow", which includes vocals by Bill.

=== Kings of Suburbia and touring (2013–2015) ===
Logo and emblem used from 2013 to 2015

On 5 January 2013, Tom Kaulitz confirmed on the "BTK Twins" app (which was recalled in November) that a new album would be released in 2013. During MTV's Musical March Madness 2013 Tournament, Tokio Hotel promised to release their new album "if they repeat as March Madness Champs". Although they did not win the award, and despite inactivity, the band managed to gather a considerable amount of support from their fanbase. Once again, Tokio Hotel announced that they were planning to release a new single on 27 October 2013 and the album the following month. However, neither the album nor any new singles were released during that year.

On 22 January 2014, the band's producer, Peter Hoffman, announced that recording for the new album had been completed and that they were in the process of selecting the track list. He stated that there was no release date yet, but the album would come out later in 2014. On 3 April, the band informed their fans via Facebook and Twitter about their recent website update, which included an official video teaser of them working on their upcoming album and never-before-seen photos of the members.

After the comeback of Tokio Hotel TV, the band announced on Twitter that the album had been finished and was currently in the hands of the label. On 3 September 2014 Bill Kaulitz announced via his Instagram account that the name of the new album would be Kings of Suburbia and it would be released on 3 October.

On 12 September, Tokio Hotel released a music video for the song "Run, Run, Run" from their new album. "Girl Got a Gun" was also released as a second promotional song on 19 September, followed by a music video on 23 September. The lead single from the album, Love Who Loves You Back, was released on 26 September, followed by a music video on 30 September. The album was released in three versions on 3 October 2014 and was number one in 30 countries and in TOP5 in 17 more countries.

Tokio Hotel's new world tour "Feel It All World Tour" started 6 March in Europe with "Part 1: the Club Experience", giving fans an exclusive personal encounter with the band in special club-sized venues. Part 2 will commence with dates in the United States, followed by dates in Latin America (Part 3) and Russia (Part 4). The second official single from the album is the namesake of the tour, "Feel It All". The video for it was released 27 March 2015, and the "Feel It All" EP was released for sale 3 April 2015.

=== Dream Machine album and tour (2016–2017) ===
During an interview in May 2016, Bill Kaulitz announced that there would be a new album titled Dream Machine and a new world tour in 2017. In late December 2016 as promotion for the album, the band released the first two songs from the album on YouTube. The first, "Something New", was released on 23 December and the second, "What If", was released on 29 December.

On 2 January 2017, the band announced via their official Facebook page that Dream Machine would be released on 3 March 2017. While they are no longer with Universal Music, they have since signed with Starwatch Music.

On 25 September 2017, Tokio Hotel announced their North America tour dates for 2018, however these dates were later cancelled due to technical issues with the band's equipment.

The third single, "Boy Don't Cry" was released on 20 October 2017 along with its accompanying music video, with also three remixes; "Regi Remix", "Tiefschwarz Remix" and "Drangsal Edit".

The fourth single, "Easy", was released on 22 December 2017 along with its accompanying music video.

=== Melancholic Paradise, Durch den Monsun 2020 and Monsoon 2020 (2018–2020) ===
On 29 October 2018, the band announced via their official Facebook page that they would be embarking on a new tour in 2019 named "Melancholic Paradise" wherein they would perform both familiar songs and new ones from their then-upcoming album. Only Europe dates were announced at that time. The singles "Melancholic Paradise", "When It Rains It Pours" and "Chateau" were respectively released on 1 February 2019, 5 April 2019, and 17 November 2019.

In October 2019, Bill Kaulitz announced via his Instagram account that the upcoming Tokio Hotel album had been finished with the recording sessions and that it would be released in 2020. Also, the next day, he announced via his Instagram account that the band had added North America and Latin America legs to their "Melancholic Paradise Tour" for the same year with the release of the band sixth studio album. The band had completed three venues on their North America and Latin America tour before the rest of the tour was since cancelled at the last minute due to the COVID-19 pandemic and resulting lockdowns worldwide.

All photos, videos and content were removed from Tokio Hotel's official Instagram account early August 2020, and older photos of the band were uploaded instead. This was later revealed to be due to the 15th anniversary of the release of the band's debut single "Durch den Monsun" on 15 August 2005.

During a live chat on Spotify, the band confirmed that new versions of "Durch den Monsun" and "Monsoon" would be released some time in Autumn 2020 as a celebration of the single's 15th anniversary. "Durch den Monsun 2020" and "Monsoon 2020" were respectively released on 2 October 2020 and 16 October 2020. Bill also confirmed that a new German-language song would be released later that year, and that a new tour was planned in 2021 for Europe and other continents. On 1 September 2020, Tokio Hotel revealed to have signed a new record deal with Sony Music Germany and Epic Records Germany throughout their official Instagram account.

Tokio Hotel announced on 4 December 2020 via Instagram their new single "Berlin", featuring a guest appearance from Canadian singer VVAVES, which was released on 11 December 2020.

=== Beyond the World Tour, collaborations and 2001 (2020–2023) ===
On 7 December 2020, the band announced via their official Facebook page and Instagram account that they would be embarking on a new tour in Autumn 2021 named "Beyond the World", promoting "Durch den Monsun 2020" and "Monsoon 2020", whilst wishing to perform more songs from their upcoming album. Only Europe dates were announced at that time.

Via their #AskTokioHotel livestream on Twitter, the band announced a new single called "White Lies", featuring a guest appearance from German EDM duo VIZE. This was released on 15 January 2021.

On 16 December 2020, the band appeared on MDR Sputnik's talk show Friends of Sputnik, where they were interviewed by host Sissy Metzschke, and later performed the songs; "Durch den Monsun 2020", "Love Who Loves You Back", "Black", "Melancholic Paradise" and "Berlin". On 7 February 2021, the band appeared on Super Bowl LV on ProSieben, on which they performed the songs; "When It Rains It Pours", "Covered in Gold", "We Found Us", "What If", "White Lies" and "Stormy Weather".

On 19 March 2021, the band started a social media contest called the White Lies Cover Challenge, where they asked fans to create their own cover of "White Lies" on video and to submit it by 4 April 2021 on Instagram, Facebook or Twitter using the hashtag #WhiteLiesCoverChallenge. The winning covers would then be used by the band in a fan video version of the song, which was uploaded to their official YouTube account on 15 April 2021.

The band had a new Instagram livestream on 25 March 2021, on which they announced a new song would be released on 28 May 2021. The new song was a dance cover of "Behind Blue Eyes" by classic rock legend The Who, and like "White Lies", the cover also featured a guest appearance from VIZE. The band also announced a remix version of "White Lies" with German DJ NOØN, which was released on 2 April 2021. Another remix version of the song with German DJ duo HBz was released on 7 May 2021.

On 14 May 2021 the band postponed the European leg of their Beyond the World Tour until Spring 2022. This was due to the ongoing COVID-19 pandemic, global lockdowns and restrictions.

Instead of the planned date of 28 May 2021, "Behind Blue Eyes" was released on 27 May 2021 to coincide with the band's live performance of the song on ProSieben's Germany's Next Topmodel on the same day.

On 7 June 2021 the band started a social media contest called the Behind Blue Eyes Cover Challenge, where, like with "White Lies", they asked fans to create their own cover of "Behind Blue Eyes" on video and to submit it on Instagram, Facebook or Twitter using the hashtag #BBE_challenge. The winning covers would then be used by the band in a fan video version of the song.

On 9 August 2021 Bill Kaulitz has revealed on a post on his official Instagram account that a new single would be released on 27 August 2021.

A new single called "Sorry Not Sorry" was released by German rapper Badchieff on 27 August 2021 with Tokio Hotel making a guest appearance.

On 27 August 2021 the band appeared on Spielesause 2021 (the German livestreaming event of Gamescom), where they performed "White Lies", "Behind Blue Eyes" and "Sorry Not Sorry" with Badchieff.

On 4 October 2021 the band announced a new single called "Here Comes the Night" via Instagram. This was released on 22 October 2021 along with an official lyric video on YouTube, which features Bill Kaulitz singing the song with lyrics popping up on the screen.

On 22 October 2021 the band performed in the restaurant China Club Berlin to promote the release of "Here Comes the Night", which was played after "White Lies" and "Behind Blue Eyes". A video of this was uploaded to the band's official YouTube channel on 28 October 2021.

On 18 December 2021 the band announced a new single called "Bad Love" via Instagram. It was originally to be released on 21 January 2022; however the band posted a message on 18 January 2022 via their Discord server announcing their record label Sony Music Germany decided to postpone the release due to Bill and Tom Kaulitz being unable to travel to Germany in time for the promotion of the single. This was eventually released on 4 February 2022 along with its accompanying music video.

On 6 March 2022 the band postponed their Beyond the World Tour until Spring 2023 in the wake of the conflict between Russia and Ukraine. A message written on their official Instagram page reads: "Dear Aliens, we are currently discussing on a daily basis what is appropriate to share and how to carry on with our music. It just doesn't feel right to do business as usual and we won't. At the same time music has always been a place of love, hope and unity and we're trying to find ways to keep sharing this with you. We're sure everybody understands that we can't pursue our upcoming tour as planned but we can announce today that we have successfully moved a majority of the shows to new dates in 2023. More to follow. All tickets remain valid. Sending love to each and everyone of you. George, Gustav, Tom and Bill."

On 16 March 2022 the band announced a new single called "HIM", which was released on 8 April 2022 along with its official music video.

On 28 April 2022 the band uploaded a "spoiler alert" snippet on their official TikTok account showing the vocals for their new single "When We Were Younger", which was released on 27 May 2022. An official snippet of the song was also posted on their official Discord server, and its official lyric video was uploaded onto their official YouTube account.

The band recorded a new single with German indie rock band Kraftklub called "Fahr mit mir (4x4)". This was released on 8 July 2022.

On 19 July 2022 the band announced their seventh album 2001 would be released on 18 November 2022.

On 24 August 2022 the band uploaded a snippet of their new single "Happy People", featuring a guest appearance from Icelandic musician Daði Freyr, to their official YouTube channel. This was released on 21 October 2022.

On 18 November 2022 the band released the new album called 2001.

=== New music and The Tour 2025 (2023–2025) ===
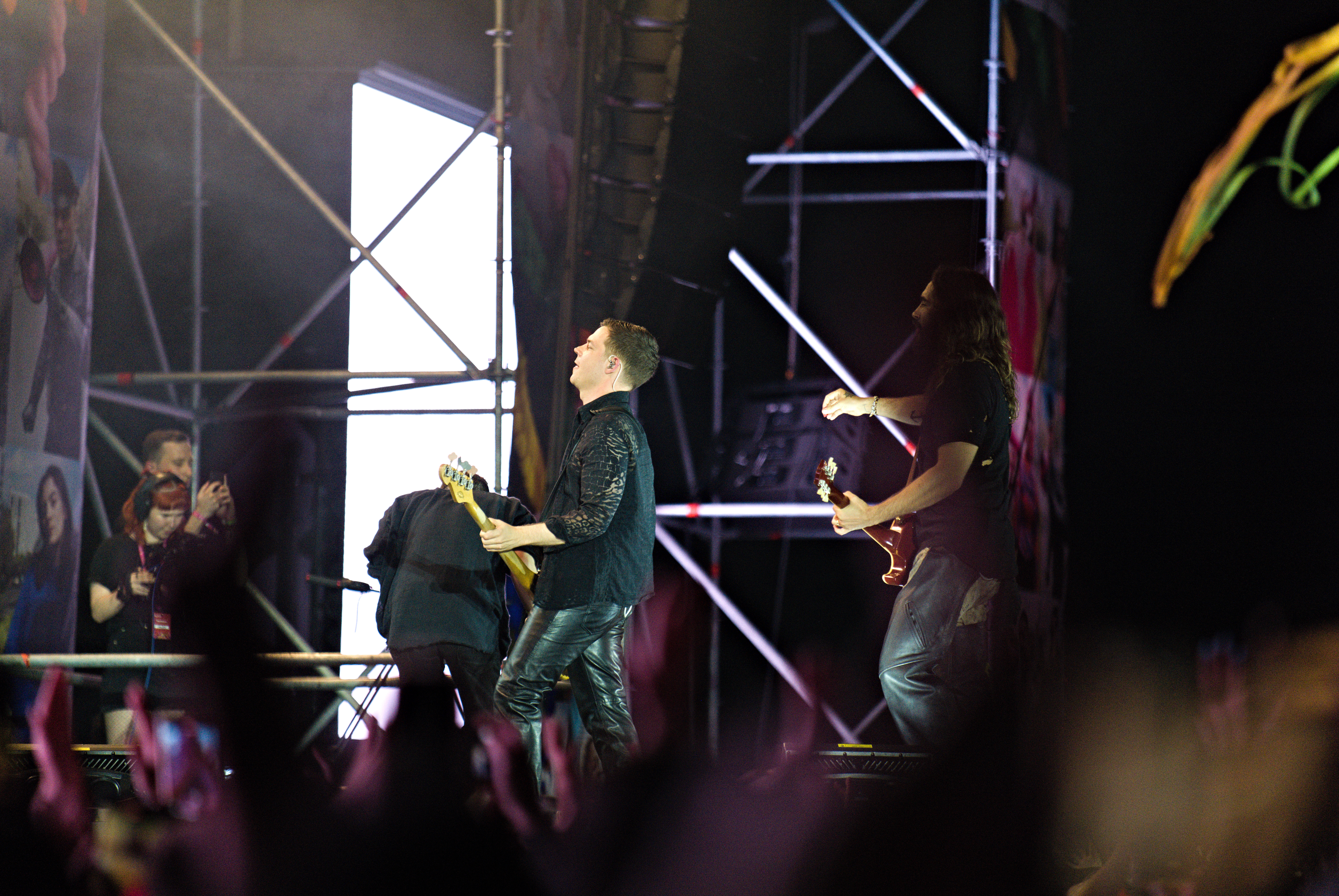
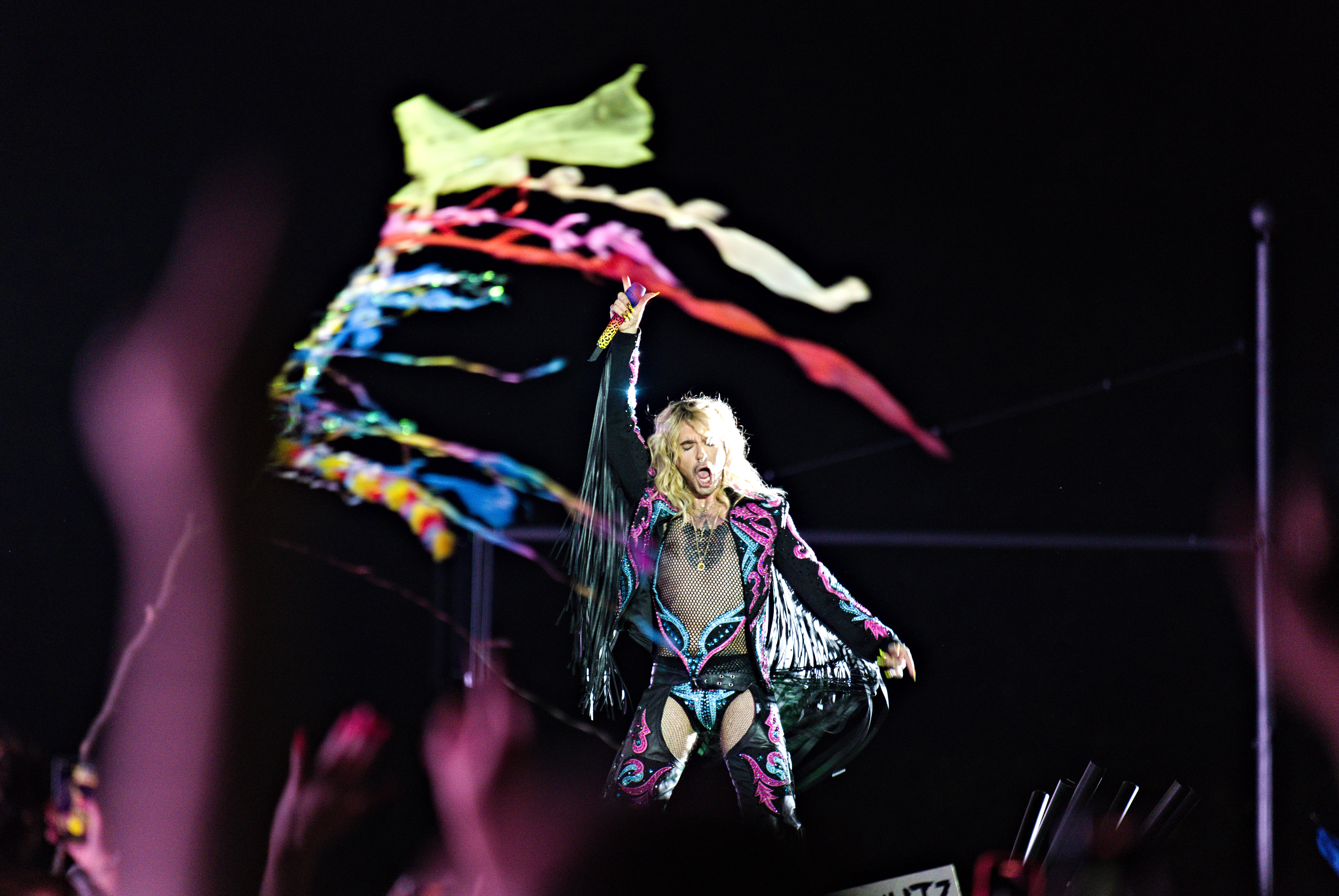
Tokio Hotel performing at Christopher Street Day in Berlin in 2023

On 4 November 2023, the band started teasing a potential Christmas song by posting photos of Bill and Tom Kaulitz on a Christmas-themed set on their official Instagram page. Three days later, the band released an Amazon Music Original song called "Your Christmas" along with a Behind the Scenes video on their official YouTube account.

On 4 December 2023, the band performed a live concert on Amazon Music DE's official Twitch account, where the songs "White Lies", "Just a Moment" and "Durch den Monsun" were played.

On 5 December 2023, the band announced a new tour called The Tour 2025. Only European dates have been announced at that time.

On 2 May 2024, the band announced a new single called "The Weekend" on their official Instagram account and a preview of the song was uploaded to their official YouTube channel. It was released on 10 May 2024.

On 7 June 2024, the band announced a new movie exclusively to Netflix called Kaulitz & Kaulitz, which is about Bill and Tom's early life, road to success and their most recent work. A trailer was released, not only showing clips of the movie, but it also teased a new upcoming song called "Home". Kaulitz & Kaulitz was released on the Netflix streaming platform on 25 June 2024, and "Home" was released on 28 June 2024.

On 20 June 2024, the band announced their LATAM leg of their Beyond the World Tour, which will take place at the end of November 2024 and through December 2024, which is only a few months before The Tour 2025 is due to take place. Dates have been announced in the United States, Canada, Mexico and parts of South America.

On 15 August 2024, the band announced they had taken part in recordings for A Whole New Sound, a pop-punk cover album of songs from old and new Disney films. They recorded their version of the song "Colors of the Wind" from the 1995 Disney film Pocahontas. The album was released on 6 September 2024, whilst the single and music video were officially released on 4 October 2024.

On 12 September 2024, Bill confirmed on Episode 4 of Tokio Hotel TV 2024 that there will be new music coming in 2025, which will be played on The Tour 2025. He also confirmed the eighth studio album will take longer to complete, and that the release window for the new album could be late 2025.

On 15 November 2024, the band featured in one of two versions of German singer/actress Nina Chuba's single "Fata Morgana", the other version being Chuba's solo recording.

On 30 January 2025, the band released their collaborative single "Miss It (At All)" with German record producer and DJ Niklas Dee.

On 19 March 2025, the band announced their Arena Tour 2026, as well as the Durch den Monsun 20 Jahre Big Anniversary Show, which will take place on 15 August 2025.

On 21 March 2025, the band released their single "Hands Up".

On 20 June 2025, the band released their single "How to Love".

On 15 August 2025, the band performed a one-time concert to celebrate the 20th anniversary of their debut single "Durch den Monsun", where they played a range of old and new songs from their catalogue.

=== Encore and Arena Tour 2026 (2025–present) ===
On 14 November 2025, the band released their single "Changes" as the lead single from their upcoming album.

On 27 February 2026, the band released their single "California Nights", the second single from their upcoming album.

On 11 May 2026, the band announced their third single from their upcoming album, "Memory Lane", which was released on 22 May 2026, and the accompanying music video was released on 24 May 2026.

On 25 May 2026, the band posted a mystery word puzzle across their social media accounts with a different question for each platform, the mystery word being the album name reveal. An early Amazon pre-order listing confirmed the name of the band's eighth studio album is Encore, which is set for release on 16 October 2026.

On 19 June 2026, the band featured on the single "Catharsis", released by German DJ KUKO.

On 10 July 2026, the band uploaded a surprise snippet of "Without You", the fourth single from their upcoming album Encore, on their Spotify countdown page. The song was released on 24 July 2026, and the accompanying music video was released on 26 July 2026.

On 18 August 2026 and 20 August 2026, the band respectively revealed the cover art and the full tracklist for Encore on their Spotify countdown page.

== Musical style ==
Since 2001, the band's musical genres have included pop rock, alternative rock, pop-punk, post-grunge, emo pop, glam rock, and electronic rock. Since 2014, the band began to perform electropop and synth-pop.

== Other activity ==
On 19 January 2010, lead singer Bill Kaulitz teamed up with twins Dean and Dan Caten of DSquared to walk the runway at a fashion event in Milan. Kaulitz made two appearances, as he opened and closed DSquared's Menswear Autumn/Winter 2010 show to Tokio Hotel's songs "Scream" and "Screamin'" respectively.

Car maker Audi hired the two frontmen to star in their new advertising campaign to attract the younger generation. They were featured in an episode of Tokio Hotel TV (on Tokio Hotel's website) and also in a commercial.

On 4 August 2010, Tom Kaulitz got his own Reebok shoe commercial. Reebok signed the 20-year-old Tokio Hotel guitarist and sneaker addict to model shoes for the company. "At home, I created a little room like a little storage room," he said of his sneakers. He also said that he gets 10 new pairs a week.

Bill and Tom Kaulitz released an app named "BTK Twins" for Android on 19 December 2011 and iOS on 16 January 2012 to keep in touch with their fans. On the app Bill and Tom posted photos, videos and text messages and fans could leave messages which the twins often responded to. In November 2013, the app was removed from both the Android and iOS store due to the imminent release of Tokio Hotel's new album.

Bill and Tom appeared as jury members on the 10th season of Deutschland sucht den Superstar, which was broadcast from 5 January until 11 May 2013.

In 2023, Bill and Tom appeared as a duo coach on the thirteenth season of The Voice of Germany. Their final artist, Malou Lovis Kreyelkamp, won the season, which made Bill and Tom the winning coaches.

== Band members ==
- Bill Kaulitz – lead vocals, occasionally guitar
- Tom Kaulitz – guitars, keyboards, piano, programming, percussion, backing vocals
- Georg Listing – bass, keyboards, backing vocals
- Gustav Schäfer – drums, percussion, backing vocals

== Discography ==
Studio albums

- Schrei (2005)
- Zimmer 483 (2007)
- Scream (also titled as Room 483) (2007)
- Humanoid (2 versions) (2009)
- Kings of Suburbia (2014)
- Dream Machine (2017)
- 2001 (2022)
- Encore (2026)

== Videography ==
Music videos

- List of Tokio Hotel music videos

Live albums

- Schrei – Live (Universal, 2006)
- Zimmer 483 – Live in Europe (Universal, 2007)
- Humanoid City Live (Cherry Tree, 2010)

Documentaries

- Leb' die Sekunde – Behind the Scenes (2005)
- Tokio Hotel TV – Caught on Camera (2008)
- Tokio Hotel – Hinter Die Welt (2017)
- Netflix Exclusive: Kaulitz & Kaulitz (2024)

== Concert tours ==
Name	Time
Schrei Tour	2005–2006
Zimmer 483 Tour	2007
1000 Hotels World Tour	2008
Welcome to Humanoid City Tour	2010–2011
Feel It All World Tour	2015
Dream Machine Tour	2017–2018
Melancholic Paradise Tour	2019–2020
Beyond the World Tour	2023–2024
The Tour	2025
Arena Tour	2026

- 1000 Hotels World Tour (2008)

— Cancelled dates due to Bill’s vocal chord surgery.

Date (2008)	City	Country	Venue
March 3	Brussels	Belgium	Forest National
March 4	Rotterdam	The Netherlands	Ahoy
March 6	Strasbourg	France	Zenith
March 7	Esch-sur-Alzette	Luxembourg	Rockhal
March 9	Paris	France	Bercy
March 10	Paris	France	Bercy
March 11	Dijon	France	Zenith
March 13	Montpellier	France	Zenith Sud
March 14	Marseille	France	Le Dome
~~March 16~~	Lisbon	Portugal	Pavilhao Atlantico
~~March 18~~	Madrid	Spain	Telefónica Arena
~~March 20~~	Douai	France	Gayant Expo
~~March 21~~	Geneva	Switzerland	Geneva Arena
~~March 23~~	Turin	Italy	Pala Isozaki
~~March 25~~	Rome	Italy	Pala Lotomattica
~~March 26~~	Bologna	Italy	Pala Malaguti
~~March 28~~	Ljubljana	Slovenia	Hala Tívoli
~~March 29~~	Belgrade	Serbia	Belgrade Arena
~~March 31~~	Dortmund	Germany	Westfalenhallen
~~April 2~~	Copenhagen	Denmark	Valby Hallen
~~April 3~~	Stockholm	Sweden	Hovet
~~April 5~~	Helsinki	Finland	Jaahalli
~~April 7~~	Oslo	Norway	Spektrum
~~April 8~~	Aalborg	Denmark	Gigantium
~~April 17~~	Detroit	United States	State Theater
~~April 18~~	Chicago	United States	House of Blues
~~April 20~~	Cleveland	United States	House of Blues
~~April 23~~	Toronto	Canada	Sound Factory
~~April 25~~	Montreal	Canada	Metropolis
~~April 26~~	Montreal	Canada	Metropolis
~~April 30~~	Boston	United States	Lowell Memorium Auditorium
~~May 1~~	Washington D.C.	United States	9:30 Club
May 3	New Jersey	United States	Bamboozle Festival
May 13	Hollywood	United States	Avalon
May 16	Toronto	Canada	Sound Academy
May 19	Montreal	Canada	Stade Uniprix

- Beyond The World Tour (2023–2024)

— Cancelled date by local promoter.

2023
Date	City	Country	Venue
April 28	Berlin	Germany	Claire BBM Probehalle
April 30	London	England	The O2
May 2	Brussels	Belgium	Ancienne Belgique
May 4	Frankfurt	Germany	Batschkapp
May 6	Arnhem	The Netherlands	Musis Parkhaal
May 7	Cologne	Germany	E-Werk
May 9	Stuttgart	Germany	Halle at Im Wizemann
May 10	Milan	Italy	Fabrique
May 12	Barcelona	Spain	Sala Apolo
May 14	Villeurbanne	France	Le Transbordeur
May 15	Paris	France	L’Olympia Bruno Coquatrix
May 17	Leipzig	Germany	Haus Auensee
May 18	Hamburg	Germany	Große Freiheit 36
May 19	Berlin	Germany	Huxley's Neue Welt
May 22	Krakow	Poland	Klub Studio
2024
Date	City	Country	Venue
November 30	Los Angeles	United States	Wiltern Theater
December 2	Montréal	Canada	Olympia
December 4	New York City	United States	Palladium Times Square
~~December 6~~	Mexico City	Mexico	Velódromo Olímpico
December 8	Lima	Peru	Anfiteatro del Parque de la Exposición
December 10	Santiago	Chile	Teatro Caupolicán
December 12	São Paulo	Brazil	Vibra São Paulo
December 14	Buenos Aires	Argentina	C Complejo Art Media

== Awards ==
Since the release of the single "Durch den Monsun" in 2005, Tokio Hotel have gone on to win 110 awards in various categories and countries.

2005

Category	Award	Date
Best Newcomer	Comet Awards (Germany)	6 October
Super Comet	Comet Awards (Germany)	6 October
Best Newcomer	Eins Live Krone	24 November
Best Pop National Act	Bambi Awards	1 December
Best Single	Golden Penguin (Austria)	
Best Pop	Golden Penguin (Austria)	
Rock Band 2005	Golden Penguin (Austria)	

2006

Category	Award	Date
Album of the year	Golden Penguin (Austria)	8 February
Band of the year	Golden Penguin (Austria)	8 February
Song of the year – 'Der Letzte Tag'	Golden Penguin (Austria)	8 February
Best Newcomer	Golden Penguin (Austria)	8 February
Ausverkaufte Tourhalle	Sold-out-Award of Königpilsener Arena	11 March
Best Newcomer	ECHO Awards (Germany)	12 March
Best Newcomer	Steiger Awards	25 March
Pop National	Radio Regenbogen (Germany)	31 March
SuperBand Rock – Golden Otto	Bravo Otto	6 May
Music Award	Bild OSGAR	22 May
Best Newcomer International	Popcorn Awards (Hungary)	26 May
Best Newcomer	Bravo Otto (Hungary)	24 June
Best International Band	Bravo Otto (Hungary)	24 June
Best Newcomer Band	Popkomm Bavarian Music Lion	21 September
Best German Pop Band	Goldene Stimmgabel	24 September
Best-Selling German Artist	World Music Awards	15 November
Best Pop National Act	Bambi Awards	30 November
Best Live Act	Eins Live Krone	7 December
Best Rock band	MTV France	

2007

Category	Award	Date
Single of the Year – Durch Den Monsun	Golden Penguin	
Best Selling German Act – Album Schrei	European Border Breakers Award	21 January
European Border Breakers Award	NRJ Awards	21 January
Rock Award	BZ-Kulturpreis	23 January
Best Video National	ECHO Awards (Germany)	25 March
SuperBand Rock – Golden otto	Bravo Otto	
Digital prize	Festivalbar (Italy)	7 September
Most Successful Group Rock International	Goldene Stimmgabel	22 September
Most Successful Popgroup International	Goldene Stimmgabel	3 October
Best Album	TMF Awards (Belgium)	13 October
Best Video	TMF Awards (Belgium)	13 October
Best New Artist	TMF Awards (Belgium)	13 October
Best Pop	TMF Awards (Belgium)	13 October
Best International Act	MTV Europe Music Awards (Germany)	1 November
Best band of the Year	MTV Nickelodeon Kids' Choice Award (Italy)	1 December

2008

Category	Award	Date
Band of the Year 2007	Golden Penguin (Austria)	January
Best International Band	Rockbjörnen Awards (Sweden)	24 January
Best Music National	Goldene Kamera (Germany)	6 February
Best Music Video	Echo Awards (Germany)	15 February
Best International Artist	Emma Gala Awards (Finland)	8 March
Best International Group	Disney Channel Kids Award (Italy)	28 March
Best Concert	Hitkrant (Netherlands)	May 2008
Best Mood Song – Monsoon	Hitkrant (Netherlands)	May 2008
Song that Stays in your Head – Monsoon	Hitkrant (Netherlands)	May 2008
Superband Rock – Silver Otto	Bravo Otto	3 May
Best Band	MTV Italian Music Awards	17 May
Best Number 1 of the Year with Monsoon	MTV TRL Awards	17 May
Best Band	Comet Awards (Germany)	23 May
Best Video – An Deiner Seite	Comet Awards (Germany)	23 May
Best Live Act	Comet Awards (Germany)	23 May
Super Comet	Comet Awards (Germany)	23 May
Best New Artist	MTV Video Music Awards (USA)	7 September
Fan Choice Best Entrance	MTV Video Music Awards (USA)	7 September
Best Male Artist International (Bill Kaulitz)	TMF Awards (Belgium)	11 October
Best Video International – Don't Jump	TMF Awards (Belgium)	11 October
Song of the Year	MTV Video Music Awards Latin America	16 October
Best Fanclub-Venezuela	MTV Video Music Awards Latin America	16 October
Best New Artist-International	MTV Video Music Awards Latin America	16 October
Best Ringtone	MTV Video Music Awards Latin America	16 October
Headliner	MTV Europe Music Awards (England)	6 November
Best Selling DVD: ZImmer 483 – Live in Europe	Rekord (Russia)	2 December

2009

Category	Award	Date
SuperBand – Golden Otto	Bravo Otto (Germany)	12 May
Best TRL Artist of the Year	MTV Italian Music Awards	16 May
Best Online Star	Comet Awards (Germany)	29 May
Export Hit of Germany	Bavarian Music Lion	17 September
International Award (2009)	Audi Generation Award (Germany)	18 October
Best Rock Video (2009)	Music New Video Music Award	September 2009
Best Group	MTV Europe Music Awards (Germany)	5 November
Best International Rock Band	Telehit Awards (Mexico)	12 November

2010

Category	Award	Date
Band of the Year	Golden Penguin (Austria)	29 January
Album of the Year	Golden Penguin (Austria)	29 January
Band of the Year	Bravoora Awards (Poland)	1 February
Best International Artist	Emma Gala Awards (Finland)	4 February
Walk of Fame	König-Pilsener Arena (Germany)	26 February
Best International Band	Radio Regenbogen Awards (Germany)	19 March
Favorite Music Star	Kids Choice Awards (Germany)	10 April
Best Live Act	Comet Awards (Germany)	21 May
Foreign Song of the Year – World Behind My Wall	Rockbjörnen Award (Sweden)	1 September
Concert of the Year	Rockbjörnen Award (Sweden)	1 September
Best World Stage Performance	MTV Europe Music Awards (Spain)	7 November
Best Group Video	Music New Video Music Award	December 2010
Best Band National	CMA Awards (Germany)	12 December
Best Single National – World Behind My Wall	CMA Awards (Germany)	12 December

2011

Category	Award	Date
Band of the Year	Bravoora Awards (Poland)	March
Star of the 20th Anniversary	Bravoora Awards (Poland)	March
Best Fan Army (Fan Army FTW)	MTV O Music Awards (USA)	28 April
Best Rock Video	MTV Video Music Awards Japan	2 July
Best Fan Club: Aliens	2Musica Awards	17 August
Fashion Icon: Bill Kaulitz	2Musica Awards	17 August
Best Videography	2Musica Awards	17 August
Best Artist in a Versus	2Musica Awards	17 August
Best Rock Artist	2Musica Awards	17 August
Best Fan Army (Fan Army FTW)	MTV O Music Awards (USA)	31 October
Best Peta2 Ad	Peta2 6th Annual Libby Awards	December

2012

Category	Award	Date
Super-Band Rock (bronze)	BRAVO OTTO (Germany)	21 March
Mister Winter 2012: Bill Kaulitz	Star Planete Awards 2012 (France)	25 March
Musical March Madness Champions	MTV Musical March Madness 2012	5 April
Hottest Rocker Boys	Q102's Online Competitions	27 May
Best Fan Club: Aliens	2Musica Awards	25 June
Best Artist in a Versus	2Musica Awards	25 June
Best Fan Army (Fan Army FTW)	MTV O Music Awards (USA)	28 June
Battle of the Boy Bands	MTV Latin America Awards (Mexico)	16 August

2013

Category	Award	Date
Best Fan Army (Fan Army FTW)	MTV O Music Awards (USA)	19 June
Biggest Fans	MTV Europe Music Awards	10 November

2014

Category	Award	Date
Album of the Year: "Kings of Suburbia"	Music Daily Awards (Hungary)	28 December
Video of the Year: "Love Who Loves You Back"	Music Daily Awards (Hungary)	28 December
Band of the Year	Music Daily Awards (Hungary)	28 December
Best Fan Club: Aliens	Music Daily Awards (Hungary)	28 December
Best International Band	Love Radio Awards (Russia)	29 December
OMG of the Year – Tokio Hotel's comeback	Love Radio Awards (Russia)	29 December

2015

Category	Award	Date
Video of the Year: "Love Who Loves You Back"	MTV Awards (Spain)	9 January
Musical March Madness Champions	MTV Musical March Madness 2015	3 April
Best Artist from the World	MTV Awards (Italy)	14 June

2018

Category	Award	Date
Best Cinematography: "Boy Don't Cry" (nominated)	Berlin Music Video Awards	28 May
